= Official Opposition Shadow Cabinet of the 43rd Legislative Assembly of British Columbia =

2024–26 Canadian provincial opposition cabinet

Official Opposition Shadow Cabinet of the 43rd Parliament of British Columbia
- Shadow Cabinet of British Columbia
- 2024–2026
- Date formed: November 20, 2024
- Date dissolved: September 22, 2026

People and organisations
- Opposition Leader: John Rustad (2024–2025); Trevor Halford (2025–2026); Heather Maahs (2026); Lorne Doerkson (2026)
- House Leader: A'aliya Warbus; Sheldon Clare
- Member party: Conservative
- Status in legislature: Official Opposition 36 / 93 (39%)

History
- Election: 2024
- Outgoing election: 2026
- Legislature term: 43rd Parliament
- Predecessor: Official Opposition Shadow Cabinet of the 42nd Legislative Assembly
- Successor: Official Opposition Shadow Cabinet of the 44th Legislative Assembly

The Shadow Cabinet of the 43rd Legislative Assembly of British Columbia, comprising members of the Conservative Party of British Columbia, was announced by Opposition leader John Rustad on November 20, 2024. The shadow cabinet was reshuffled by Kerry-Lynne Findlay following her election as party leader in 2026.

== List of Shadow Cabinets ==
=== Findlay ===
(From June 30, 2026, to September 20, 2026)

- Leader of the Conservative Party and Critic for Land and Property Jurisdiction: Kerry-Lynne Findlay
- Leader of the Official Opposition and Critic for Childcare and Early Childhood Education: Heather Maahs
- Official Opposition House Leader: Sheldon Clare
- Deputy House Leader and Assistant Deputy Speaker: Lorne Doerkson
- Official Opposition Whip: Macklin McCall
- Deputy Whip and Critic for Children and Family Development: Reann Gasper (until August 22)
- Caucus Chair and Critic for Government Services: Jody Toor
- Critic for Tourism: Bruce Banman (until August 27)
- Critic for Transportation: Harman Bhangu
- Critic for Community Safety: Rosalyn Bird (until August 25)
- Critic for Education: Lynne Block
- Critic for Arts, Culture, and AI and Stakeholder Relations Lieutenant: Brent Chapman
- Critic for Mining and Critical Minerals: Pete Davis
- Critic for Seniors and Rural Health: Brennan Day (until August 26)
- Critic for Economic Development: Gavin Dew
- Critic for Parental Rights and Sports: Mandeep Dhaliwal
- Critic for Labour: Kiel Giddens
- Critic for Transit and ICBC: Trevor Halford (until September 18)
- Critic for Rural Infrastructure and Development and Caucus Representative to the CPBC Board: Sharon Hartwell
- Critic for Environment and Parks: Linda Hepner (until September 20)
- Critic for Health and Vancouver Island Lieutenant: Anna Kindy
- Critic for Attorney General and Stakeholder Relations Lieutenant: Steve Kooner
- Critic for Prosperity and Social Development: Kristina Loewen
- Critic for Municipal Affairs: Tony Luck
- Critic for Indigenous Relations: Scott McInnis (until September 2)
- Critic for Finance: Peter Milobar (until August 14)
- Critic for Trade and Skills Training and Stakeholder Relations Lieutenant: Lawrence Mok
- Critic for Post Secondary Education and International Credentials: Korky Neufeld
- Critic for Energy: Larry Neufeld
- Critic for Agriculture and Lower Mainland Lieutenant: Ian Paton (until August 24)
- Critic for Mental Health, Addictions, and Social Housing: Claire Rattée (until September 18)
- Critic for Treasury Board: John Rustad (until September 18)
- Critic for Forestry: Ward Stamer
- Critic for Solicitor General and Emergency Response: Bryan Tepper
- Critic for Infrastructure: Misty Van Popta
- Critic for Housing: Á'a:líya Warbus (until August 27)
- Critic for Multiculturalism and Community Partnerships: Teresa Wat (until August 31)
- Critic for BC Hydro and Electrical Energy Development and Okanagan and Interior Lieutenant: David Williams
- Critic for Water, Land, Fisheries, and Wildlife Management: Donegal Wilson (until September 2)

=== Rustad/Halford ===
Critic	Portfolio	Constituency	Duration
Caucus Officers
John Rustad	Leader of Official Opposition	Nechako Lakes	October 19, 2024–December 4, 2025
Trevor Halford	Leader of Official Opposition	Surrey-White Rock	December 4, 2025–June 29, 2026
A'aliya Warbus	Leader of the House	Chilliwack-Cultus Lake	November 20, 2024–June 29, 2026
A'aliya Warbus	Caucus Chair	Chilliwack-Cultus Lake	November 20, 2024–June 29, 2026
Bruce Banman	Caucus Whip	Abbotsford South	November 20, 2024–June 29, 2026
Sheldon Clare	Deputy Caucus Whip	Prince George-North Cariboo	November 20, 2024–June 29, 2026
Shadow Ministers
Ian Paton	Agriculture, Fisheries and Agricultural Land Commission	Delta South	November 20, 2024–June 29, 2026
Jordan Kealy	Agriculture Expansion and Food Security	Peace River North	November 20, 2024–March 7, 2025
Steve Kooner	Attorney General	Richmond-Queensborough	November 20, 2024–June 29, 2026
Dallas Brodie	Attorney General – Justice Reform	Vancouver-Quilchena	November 20, 2024–March 7, 2025
David Williams	BC Hydro and Electricity Self-Sufficiency	Salmon Arm-Shuswap	November 20, 2024–June 29, 2026
Reann Gasper	Child Care, Children and Youth with Support Needs	Abbotsford-Mission	November 20, 2024–June 29, 2026
Amelia Boultbee	Children and Family Development	Penticton-Summerland	November 20, 2024–October 20, 2025
Heather Maahs	Children and Family Development – Indigenous Self-Government in Child and Family Services	Chilliwack North	November 20, 2024–June 29, 2026
Rosalyn Bird	Citizens' Services	Prince George-Valemount	November 20, 2024–June 30, 2026
Hon Chan	Climate Solutions and Climate Readiness	Richmond Centre	November 20, 2024–June 30, 2026
Bryan Tepper	Community Safety and Integrated Services	Surrey-Panorama	November 20, 2024–June 30, 2026
Lynne Block	Education	West Vancouver-Capilano	November 20, 2024–June 30, 2026
Macklin McCall	Emergency Management	West Kelowna-Peachland	November 20, 2024–June 29, 2026
Trevor Halford	Environment and Parks	Surrey-White Rock	November 20, 2024–June 30, 2026
Peter Milobar	Finance	Kamloops Centre	November 20, 2024–June 30, 2026
Ward Stamer	Forests	Kamloops-North Thompson	November 20, 2024–June 30, 2026
Anna Kindy	Health	North Island	November 20, 2024–June 29, 2026
Linda Hepner	Housing	Surrey-Serpentine River	November 20, 2024–June 30, 2026
Scott McInnis	Indigenous Relations and Reconciliation	Columbia River-Revelstoke	November 20, 2024–June 30, 2026
Misty Van Popta	Infrastructure and Construction	Langley-Walnut Grove	November 20, 2024–June 30, 2026
Gavin Dew	Jobs, Economic Development and Innovation	Kelowna-Mission	November 20, 2024–June 30, 2026
Kiel Giddens	Labour	Prince George-Mackenzie	November 20, 2024–June 30, 2026
Claire Rattée	Mental Health and Addictions	Skeena	November 20, 2024–June 30, 2026
Pete Davis	Mining, Critical Minerals and Columbia Treaty	Kootenay-Rockies	November 20, 2024–June 30, 2026
Tony Luck	Municipal Affairs and Local Government	Fraser-Nicola	November 20, 2024–June 30, 2026
Larry Neufeld	Natural Gas and LNG	Peace River South	November 20, 2024–June 30, 2026
Mandeep Dhaliwal	Parental Rights and Sports	Surrey North	November 20, 2024–June 30, 2026
Korky Neufeld	Post-Secondary Education	Abbotsford West	November 20, 2024–June 30, 2026
Sharon Hartwell	Rural Communities and Rural Development	Bulkley Valley-Stikine	November 20, 2024–June 29, 2026
Brennan Day	Rural Health and Seniors’ Health	Courtenay-Comox	November 20, 2024–June 30, 2026
Kristina Loewen	Rural Housing and Building Code	Kelowna Centre	November 20, 2024–June 30, 2026
Lawrence Mok	Skills Training and International Credentials	Maple Ridge East	November 20, 2024–June 29, 2026
Elenore Sturko	Solicitor General and Public Safety	Surrey-Cloverdale	November 20, 2024–September 22, 2025
Tara Armstrong	Social Development and Poverty Reduction	Kelowna-Lake Country-Coldstream	November 20, 2024–March 7, 2025
Teresa Wat	Tourism, Arts, Culture, Anti-Racism and Trade	Richmond-Bridgeport	November 20, 2024–June 30, 2026
Harman Bhangu	Transportation	Langley-Abbotsford	November 20, 2024–June 30, 2026
Brent Chapman	Transit and ICBC	Surrey South	November 20, 2024–June 29, 2026
Donegal Wilson	Water, Land, Resource Stewardship and Wildlife Management	Boundary-Similkameen	November 20, 2024–June 30, 2026

== Shadow cabinet composition and shuffles ==
On March 7, 2025, the critic for the Attorney General Dallas Brodie was expelled from the Conservative Party caucus and the shadow cabinet after she was recorded mocking victims of residential schools. Immediately afterwards Tara Armstrong (the critic for Social Development and Poverty Reduction) and Jordan Kealy (the critic for Agriculture Expansion and Food Security) resigned from the Conservative caucus in protest.

On September 22, 2025, Elenore Sturko (who held the shadow portfolio of Solicitor General and Public Safety) was ejected from the Conservative caucus. Amelia Boultbee (the critic for Children and Family Development) resigned from caucus on October 20.

On December 3, 2025, Rustad was removed as party leader and was replaced by Trevor Halford on an interim basis. Following a brief leadership dispute, Rustad officially resigned as leader on December 4.

In May 2026, Kerry-Lynne Findlay was elected BC Conservative leader. Heather Maahs was appointed as leader of the Opposition by Findlay in June 2026.

In August and September 2026, several BC Conservative MLAs left or were expelled from the party: Peter Milobar, Ian Paton, Rosalyn Bird, Teresa Wat, Brennan Day, Bruce Banman, Á'a:líya Warbus, Donegal Wilson, Scott McInnis, Halford, Rustad, Linda Hepner, and Claire Rattée. Findlay resigned on September 20, and was succeeded by Lorne Doerkson as interim leader.

== See also ==
- Official Opposition Shadow Cabinet of the 42nd Legislative Assembly of British Columbia
- Cabinet of Canada
- Official Opposition (Canada)
- Shadow Cabinet
- Official Opposition Shadow Cabinet (British Columbia)
