= Withdrawal of BC United from the 2024 British Columbia general election =

Campaign suspension of BC United

Withdrawal of BC United from the 2024 general election
- Date: August 28, 2024
- Location: Vancouver, British Columbia
- Cause: Loss in support for BC United and rise in support for the BC Conservatives ahead of the 2024 general election
- Participants: Kevin Falcon; John Rustad
- Outcome: Suspension of BC United's 2024 election campaign; BC United's endorsement of the BC Conservatives; BC NDP re-elected; Foundation of CentreBC (2025)

On August 28, 2024 during the campaign of the 2024 British Columbia general election, BC United (formerly known as the British Columbia Liberal Party) leader and leader of the Opposition Kevin Falcon announced that the party was suspending their electoral campaign, and endorsed the Conservative Party of British Columbia led by John Rustad. It was the first time that BC United/BC Liberals had not contested a general election in British Columbia since the party's founding in 1903, and seemingly ended the Liberal–NDP era of British Columbian politics that had existed since the early 1990s.

== Background ==
In the 2020 British Columbia general election, the BC Liberals lost 13 seats and continued to form the Official Opposition with Andrew Wilkinson as their leader. Wilkinson resigned shortly after the election, which began a leadership campaign that was eventually won by Kevin Falcon on February 5, 2022. One of Falcon's promises during the leadership campaign was to rebrand the BC Liberals to reflect their position as a centre-right "free enterprise coalition", which had not been affiliated with the Liberal Party of Canada since the 1980s. It is speculated that this rebrand was also meant to distance themselves from the concurrent federal Liberal government led by Justin Trudeau, whose government was becoming very unpopular between 2023 and 2024. On April 12, 2023, the BC Liberals were officially rebranded to BC United. During this time, Falcon also decided to eject John Rustad from the BC Liberal caucus on August 18, 2022 due to Rustad's alleged denial of climate change. Rustad would then join the BC Conservatives and become their leader in 2023.

In the spring of 2023 around the time of the rebrand, support for BC United began to rapidly drop according to opinion polls, while the BC Conservatives led by Rustad surpassed BC United in opinion polls by September 2023. This was a major political shock in the province, as the BC Conservatives who had not won a seat in a general election since 1975 were projected to form the Official Opposition. By May 5, 2024, 338Canada projected that BC United would not win any seats in the next election, while the Conservatives were polling just below the governing New Democrats, and an electoral victory seemed like a realistic possibility for the first time since 1928. This switch was partially attributed to the rebrand, which had arguably wrecked the party's brand and identity. It was also attributed the rising popularity of the Conservative Party of Canada led by Pierre Poilievre, with Rustad equating BC United with the federal Liberals.

Between 2023 and 2024, both parties claimed to have entered talks into forming some sort of non-competition agreement, but the negotiations broke down each time.

== Withdrawal ==
On August 28, 2024, Rustad and Falcon hosted a press conference where Falcon announced that he had suspended his party's 2024 election campaign, and was withdrawing all of BC United's candidate nominations. Prior to the campaign suspension, BC United had nominated candidates in 56 of British Columbia's 93 constituencies, including 11 incumbent members of the Legislative Assembly. (Note: The party website listed 57 candidates at the time of the withdrawal of the party, however, Dave Sidhu was still listed as a candidate in Abbotsford West despite dropping out as a candidate earlier in August.) During this announcement, Falcon endorsed the BC Conservatives, saying "John Rustad and I haven't always agreed on everything, but one thing is clear: our province cannot take another four years of the NDP". Falcon noted that this was done to prevent vote splitting in competitive ridings. Falcon stated that while campaigning, he had heard from tens-of-thousands of people that their primary concern regarding the election was that BC United's campaign would pull support away from the Conservatives, and lead to the re-election of an NDP government, and that "[Falcon] needed to do the right thing and be the adult in the room" and endorse the Conservatives to "bring together [a] free enterprise, centre-right, common sense coalition".

Mike Bernier (the MLA for Peace River South) pointed out that Falcon, as leader, only had the power to withdraw the party from the forthcoming contest, but could not do so on behalf of the individual candidates. Elections BC confirmed that that was a correct interpretation of the elections law, and only the candidates could choose to withdraw or to stand as independent or unaffiliated on the ballot. Several BCU candidates were openly considering accepting a Conservative nomination. Bernier confirmed that he had spoken with Karin Kirkpatrick (the MLA for West Vancouver-Capilano) about the possibility of several of the BCU candidates forming their own alliance or possible new party before the required registration deadline, or even forming a party post-election, as Legislature rules recognize a party as long as it has at least two MLAs.

On September 20, BCU announced that it would not field any paper candidates in this campaign. Under BC's election law, they can still maintain their registration as long as they nominate candidates in the next round (tentatively scheduled for 2028).

There was further fallout in September, when a mailout was sent to BCU's members urging them to renew their membership, under a letterhead bearing the name of John Yap (who had resigned as party president the previous month). It was speculated that the mailing had been previously scheduled but not cancelled upon BCU's staff vacating their offices. BCU also secured a commitment from the Legislature to cover any shortfall in meeting severance obligations for their staff, estimated to cost up to $1 million.

Prior to folding, the party had commissioned research to aid in attacks on Conservative nominees. Former MLA and current media personality Jas Johal released a file that was subsequently confirmed to be a working draft, although incomplete. The NDP were making use of the released information.

== Reactions ==
Karin Kirkpatrick, the incumbent BC United MLA for West Vancouver-Capilano, announced that the BC United caucus had been blindsided by the decision to suspend the campaign, and that she "[felt] very stabbed in the back" by Falcon. Kirkpatrick decided to continue running as an independent following the party's withdrawal.

David Eby, the premier of British Columbia and leader of the BC NDP, reacted to the news during an unrelated news conference later that day. Eby stated that both Rustad and Falcon were trying to distance themselves from their record as members of the former BC Liberal government and that "whatever they change their name to before the election, they're still the same guys".

Sonia Furstenau, the leader of the Green Party, during an interview announced that she hoped some of BC United's former candidates could succeed as independents in the next election to challenge the status of the two major parties.

Herb Dhaliwal, a former federal Cabinet minister, attempted to found an organization to be called the New Liberal Party of BC, but found that BCU still controlled the Liberal name under BC's election law. He urged Elections BC to reconsider its decision, saying, "There are lots of people, they're not interested in voting for either [the BCU or the Conservatives], so they feel betrayed and they feel orphaned by what's happened."

== Impact on candidates ==
=== BC United candidates ===
Fate of BC United candidates after party withdrawal from contention
District	Candidate	Withdrew	Continued standing as			Elected
District	Candidate	Withdrew	Con.	Ind.	Un.	Elected
Abbotsford-Mission	Merrick Matteazzi	✓				
Abbotsford South	Markus Delves	✓				
Boundary-Similkameen	Ron Hovanes	✓				
Burnaby East	Tariq Malik	✓				
Burnaby-New Westminster	Daniel Kofi Ampong			✓		✗
Burnaby North	Michael Wu		✓			✗
Burnaby South-Metrotown	Meiling Chia				✓	✗
Cariboo-Chilcotin	Michael Grenier	✓				
Chilliwack-Cultus Lake	Sue Attrill Knott	✓				
Chilliwack North	David Moniz	✓				
Columbia River-Revelstoke	Scott McInnis		✓			✓
Coquitlam-Burke Mountain	Kash Tayal	✓				
Courtenay-Comox	Bill Coltart	✓				
Cowichan Valley	Jon Coleman				✓	✗
Delta North	Amrit Pal Singh Dhot	✓				
Delta South	Ian Paton (I)		✓			✓
Esquimalt-Colwood	Meagan Brame	✓				
Fraser-Nicola	Jackie Tegart (I)	✓				
Juan de Fuca-Malahat	Herb Haldane	✓				
Kamloops Centre	Peter Milobar (I)		✓			✓
Kamloops-North Thompson	Todd Stone (I)	✓				
Kelowna Centre	Michael Humer				✓	✗
Kelowna-Lake Country-Coldstream	Pavneet Singh	✓				
Kelowna-Mission	Ashley Ramsay				✓	✗
Kootenay-Rockies	Tom Shypitka (I)			✓		✗
Ladysmith-Oceanside	Lehann Wallace	✓				
Langford-Highlands	Sean Flynn	✓				
Langley-Abbotsford	Karen Long			✓		✗
Langley-Walnut Grove	Barb Martens	✓				
Mid Island-Pacific Rim	Joshua Dahling	✓				
Nanaimo-Gabriola Island	Dale Parker		✓			✗
Nechako Lakes	Shane Brienen	✓				
North Vancouver-Seymour	James Mitchell	✓				
Peace River North	Dan Davies (I)			✓		✗
Peace River South	Mike Bernier (I)				✓	✗
Penticton-Summerland	Tracy St. Claire				✓	✗
Port Coquitlam	Keenan Adams		✓			✗
Prince George-Mackenzie	Kiel Giddens		✓			✓
Prince George-Valemount	Shirley Bond (I)	✓				
Prince George-North Cariboo	Coralee Oakes (I)			✓		✗
Richmond Centre	Wendy Yuan				✓	✗
Richmond-Queensborough	Pavan Bahia	✓				
Richmond-Steveston	Jackie Lee				✓	✗
Salmon Arm-Shuswap	Greg McCune			✓		✗
Surrey-Cloverdale	Claudine Storness-Bliss	✓				
Surrey-Guildford	Noemi Victorino	✓				
Surrey-Newton	Japreet Lehal				✓	✗
Surrey South	Ernie Klassen	✓				
Surrey-White Rock	Trevor Halford (I)		✓			✓
Vancouver-Kensington	Aronjit Lageri		✓ (Vancouver-South Granville)			✗
Vancouver-Langara	Jaime Stein	✓				
Vancouver-Quilchena	Kevin Falcon (I)	✓				
Vernon-Lumby	Kevin Acton				✓	✗
Victoria-Swan Lake	Daryl Learned	✓				
West Kelowna-Peachland	Stephen Johnston				✓	✗
West Vancouver-Capilano	Caroline Elliott	✓				
Totals	56	30	9	17		5

= Incumbent MLA

=== Conservative candidates ===
As a result of some BC United MLAs becoming Conservative candidates, some of the already nominated Conservative candidates had their nominations revoked and/or were made to stand in a different riding.

Fate of BC Conservative candidates after BC United withdrawal from contention
District	Candidate	Withdrew	Continued standing as		Elected
District	Candidate	Withdrew	Con. in different riding	Un.	Elected
Burnaby North	Simon Chandler		✓ (Burnaby East)		✗
Columbia River-Revelstoke	AJ Wolfe	✓			
Kamloops Centre	Dennis Giesbrecht		✓ (Vernon-Lumby)		✗
Nanaimo-Gabriola Island	Viraat Thammanna	✓			
Prince George-Mackenzie	Rachael Weber			✓	✗
Surrey-Panorama	Dupinder Saran	✓			
Surrey-White Rock	Bryan Tepper		✓ (Surrey-Panorama)		✓
West Vancouver-Capilano	Jaclyn Aubichon	✓			

== Aftermath ==
In the 2024 election, the New Democrats won a narrow majority government by 1 seat while the Conservatives formed the Official Opposition. 9 former BC United MLAs ran in the election as Conservatives, with 5 of them being elected. None of the former BC United or Conservative candidates who ran as independents were elected.

Many BC United politicians called on Kevin Falcon to resign as leader of the party following their collapse and forfeit of the general election, although he denied these requests on the grounds of not increasing the party's debt, as the party was struggling financially following the campaign's suspension. As a result of this refusal, Karin Kirkpatrick founded a new political party named CentreBC, which she hoped could serve as a centre-right replacement for BC United.
