= 43rd Parliament of British Columbia =

Canadian provincial legislature since 2025

- Majority parliament
- Feb. 18, 2025 – Sep. 22, 2026

Parliament leaders
- Premier: David Eby; Nov. 18, 2022 – Nov. 20, 2026
- Cabinet: Eby ministry (2nd term)
- Leader of the Opposition: John Rustad; Oct. 19, 2024 – Dec. 4, 2025
- Trevor Halford; Dec. 4, 2025 – Jun. 29, 2026
- Heather Maahs; Jun. 29, 2026 – Sep. 20, 2026
- Lorne Doerkson; Sep. 20, 2026 – Nov. 20, 2026

Party caucuses
- Government: New Democratic
- Opposition: Conservative
- Recognized: Green
- OneBC
- CentreBC

Legislative Assembly
- Speaker of the Assembly: Raj Chouhan; Dec. 7, 2020 – Oct. 24, 2026
- Government House leader: Mike Farnworth; Nov. 18, 2024 – Nov. 20, 2026
- Opposition House leader: Áʼa:líya Warbus; Nov. 20, 2024 – Jun. 29, 2026
- Sheldon Clare; Jun. 29, 2026 – Nov. 20, 2026
- Members: 93 MLA seats

Sovereign
- Monarch: Charles III; Sep. 8, 2022 – present
- Lieutenant governor: Janet Austin; Apr. 24, 2018 – Jan. 30, 2025
- Wendy Lisogar-Cocchia; Jan. 30, 2025 – present

Sessions
- 1st session February 18, 2025 – February 12, 2026
- 2nd session February 17, 2026 – September 22, 2026
← 42nd	→ 44th

The 43rd Parliament of British Columbia was in session from February 18, 2025, to September 22, 2026. Its membership was chosen in the 2024 British Columbia general election.

The general election returned the incumbent New Democratic Eby ministry with a bare majority in the legislature. With Raj Chouhan, the MLA for Burnaby-New Westminster, having been re-elected as the speaker of the Legislative Assembly, there were equal number of seats on the sides of the aisle.

The Conservative Party reclaimed its place as the official opposition and principal rival to the NDP, having secured 44 seats, the first time it had elected any members since 1979, and the first time it was of political significance since the collapse of the coalition Boss Johnson ministry in 1952.

The 43rd parliament was notable in that it was the first, and to date only, legislature in Canada where women constituted a majority of the members at its formation. (Note: It was however not the first legislature with a female member majority. The 19th Northwest Territories Legislative Assembly achieved a majority of women MLAs in 2021 after a by-election.) 49 of the 93 members, or 52%, initially elected were women.

The opposition MLAs were sworn in on November 12, 2024, and the government MLAs were sworn in on November 13, 2024. The 43rd parliament was formally convened on February 18, 2025, for the acclamation of Chouhan back to the chair and the speech from the throne delivered by newly installed lieutenant governor Wendy Lisogar-Cocchia.

On September 22, 2026, Eby advised the lieutenant governor to dissolve Parliament, triggering a general election on October 24.

== Party standings ==
Standings in the 43rd British Columbia Parliament
Party	Leader	House members		
Party	Leader	2024 election	At dissolution	Change
New Democratic	David Eby	47	47	Steady
Conservative	Lorne Doerksen (interim)	44	28	▼16
CentreBC	Peter Milobar	0	8	▲8
Green	Jeremy Valeriote, parliamentary (Note: Party leader Emily Lowan does not currently hold a seat.)	2	2	Steady
OneBC	Dallas Brodie (interim)	0	2	▲2
Independent		0	4	▲4
Total occupied seats		93	91	▼2
Vacant		0	2	▲2
Total seats		93		

== Presiding officers and parliamentary leaders ==
=== Speaker and chair occupants ===
- Composition of the Legislative Assembly of British Columbia after the 2024 British Columbia general election
  Speaker of the Legislative Assembly: Raj Chouhan, NDP
- Deputy speaker: Mable Elmore, NDP
- Composition of the Legislative Assembly of British Columbia as of dissolution in September 2026
  Assistant deputy speaker: vacant

=== Parliamentary and caucus leaders ===
Government caucus, New Democratic Party caucus

- Premier of British Columbia: David Eby, NDP
- Government House leader: Mike Farnworth, NDP
- Government whip: Janet Routledge, NDP
- Frontbench: Eby ministry

Official opposition, Conservative Party caucus

- Leader of the Opposition: Lorne Doerkson (interim, from September 20, 2026)
  - John Rustad (previous; until December 4, 2025)
  - Trevor Halford (previous; interim, December 4, 2025 – June 29, 2026)
  - Heather Maahs (previous; interim, June 29, 2026 – September 20, 2026)
- Opposition House leader: Sheldon Clare
  - Áʼa:líya Warbus (previous; until June 29, 2026)
- Opposition whip: vacant
  - Bruce Banman (previous; until September 18, 2026)
- Opposition deputy whip: Sheldon Clare
- Frontbench: Shadow cabinet

Third party, Green Party caucus

- Parliamentary leader: Jeremy Valeriote (was interim party leader until September 24, 2025)
- Green Party House leader: Rob Botterell

Fourth party, OneBC Party caucus

- Party leader: Dallas Brodie (interim; June 9, 2025 – December 13, 2025; since December 21, 2025)

Unrecognized party, CentreBC Party

- Party leader:Peter Milobar (from September 18, 2026)

== Timeline of events ==
Date	Event	Category	Notes & references
2024
Oct 19, 2024	The 2024 British Columbia general election concludes with the British Columbia New Democratic Party having secured 47 seats, the minimum number required for a majority government in the new expanded legislature, enabling the incumbent Eby ministry to remain in power. The Conservative Party of British Columbia secures 44 seats and beccomes the official opposition. The Green Party remains in third place with two seats, their leader Sonia Furstenau not among them.	Membership	
Nov 18, 2024	Premier David Eby (Vancouver-Point Grey) executes a major post-election cabinet shuffle, elevating 12 new members into the Eby ministry.	Ministry	
Dec 12, 2024	The BC NDP and BC Greens announces the "Co-operation and Responsible Government Accord".	Supply & confidence	
2025
Jan 28, 2025	Green Party leader Sonia Furstenau announces her resignation as party leader. Jeremy Valeriote (West Vancouver-Sea to Sky) assumes interim leadership.	Green leadership	
March 7, 2025	Dallas Brodie (Vancouver-Quilchena) is removed from the Conservative caucus for comments about residential schools. Following this, Jordan Kealy (Peace River North) and Tara Armstrong (Kelowna-Lake Country-Coldstream) leave the Conservative caucus.	Conservative	
June 9, 2025	Brodie and Armstrong launches a new party called OneBC, with Brodie serving as interim leader and Armstrong as house leader.	OneBC	
July 17, 2025	Eby announces a small cabinet shuffle, with six ministers changing portfolios, two new minister elevated and two incumbent minister returned to the backbench.	Ministry	
Sep 22, 2025	Conservative leader John Rustad (Nechako Lakes) passes the party's leadership review with 70.66% support. Elenore Sturko (Surrey-Cloverdale) is subsequently removed from the Conservative caucus.	Conservative	
Sep 24, 2025	Emily Lowan wins the 2025 Green Party of British Columbia leadership election.	Green leadership	
Oct 20, 2025	Amelia Boultbee (Penticton-Summerland) leaves the Conservative caucus to sit as an independent.	Conservative	
Nov 15, 2025	The NDP endorses Eby's leadership at its leadership review with 82% support.	NDP	
Dec 3, 2025	Rustad is removed as Conservative leader by the party's board of directors and caucus and is replaced by Surrey-White Rock MLA Trevor Halford as interim leader. Rustad disputes the legitimacy of his removal.	Conservative leadership	
Dec 4, 2025	Rustad resigns as party leader.	Conservative leadership	
Dec 13, 2025	Brodie is removed as interim leader of OneBC.	OneBC leadership	
Dec 16, 2025	Armstrong leaves OneBC to become an independent. The party loses representation in the legislature.	OneBC	
Dec 21, 2025	Brodie reassumes the leadership of OneBC after its board resigns following negotiations. The party regains representation in the legislature but with fewer than two members, it does not regain official party status in the legislature.	OneBC	
2026
Feb 9, 2026	The BC Greens decide not to renew their "Co-operation and Responsible Government Accord" with the BC NDP.	Confidence & supply	
March 26, 2026	Hon Chan (Richmond Centre) is removed from the Conservative caucus and sits as an independent.	Conservative	
May 30, 2026	Kerry-Lynne Findlay wins the 2026 Conservative Party of British Columbia leadership election.	Conservative leadership	
July 3, 2026	Boultbee joins the New Democratic Party caucus.	NDP	
Aug 14, 2026	Eby conducts a minor cabinet shuffle following Finance Minister Brenda Bailey's revelation of a cancer diagnosis.	Ministry	
Aug 14, 2026	Peter Milobar (Kamloops Centre) leaves the Conservative caucus to sit as an independent.	Conservative	
Aug 22, 2026	Reann Gasper (Abbotsford-Mission) resigns her seat, allowing party leader Findlay to run for her seat in a September by-election.	Conservative; composition	
Aug 24, 2026	Ian Paton (Delta South) leaves the Conservative caucus to sit as an independent.	Conservative	
Aug 25, 2026	Rosalyn Bird (Prince George-Valemount) leaves the Conservative caucus to sit as an independent.	Conservative	
Aug 26, 2026	Teresa Wat (Richmond-Bridgeport) and Brennan Day (Courtenay-Comox) leave the Conservative caucus to sit as independents.	Conservative	
Aug 27, 2026	Bruce Banman (Abbotsford South) leaves the Conservative caucus to sit as an independent.	Conservative	
Aug 28, 2026	Joan Philip (Vancouver-Strathcona) dies.	NDP; composition	
Aug 31, 2026	Áʼa:líya Warbus (Chilliwack-Cultus Lake) leaves the Conservative caucus to sit as an independent.	Conservative	
Sep 2, 2026	Donegal Wilson (Boundary-Similkameen) and Scott McInnis (Columbia River-Revelstoke) leave the Conservative caucus to sit as independents.	Conservative	
Sep 18, 2026	Trevor Halford (Surrey-White Rock), Claire Rattée (Skeena) and John Rustad are removed from the Conservative caucus for calling on Findlay to resign.	Conservative	
Sep 18, 2026	Eight MLAs join CentreBC, with Milobar as leader.	CentreBC	
Sep 20, 2026	Linda Hepner (Surrey-Serpentine River) leaves the Conservative caucus to sit as an independent.	Conservative	
Sep 20, 2026	Kerry-Lynne Findlay resigns as Conservative leader. Lorne Doerkson becomes the interim leader of the Conservative Party.	Conservative leadership	
Sep 21, 2026	Rustad, McInnis, Halford, Rattée, and Hepner return to the Conservative caucus.	Conservative	
Sep 22, 2026	Prior to the election call, Brent Chapman (Surrey South, spouse of former Conservative leader Findlay), crosses the floor from the Conservatives to OneBC	Conservative	
Sep 22, 2026	Eby announces a snap election to be held on October 24, 2026.	Dissolution	
Sep 22, 2026	After the election call, independent Brennan Day and all CentreBC MLAs, except for Sturko, rejoin the Conservatives.	Conservative	

== Members ==
- The name in bold and italics, with "††", is the premier
- The names in bold, with "†", are cabinet ministers and ministers of state
- The name in italics, with "‡", is the leader of the Official Opposition
- The names in italics are party leaders
- The name with "*" is the speaker of the Assembly

Electoral district	Member	Party	First elected / previously elected	No. of terms
Abbotsford South	Bruce Banman	Conservative (Note: Elected to 43rd Parliament as member of the Conservatives)	2020 (Note: First elected as a Liberal)	2
Abbotsford South	Bruce Banman	Independent (Note: resigned from caucus on August 27, 2026)	2020	2
Abbotsford South	Bruce Banman	CentreBC (Note: Joined CentreBC on September 18, 2026)	2020	2
Abbotsford West	Korky Neufeld	Conservative	2024	1
Abbotsford-Mission	Reann Gasper	Conservative (Note: Resigned August 22, 2026)	2024	1
Abbotsford-Mission		Vacant (Note: By-election to be held September 26, 2026)		
Boundary-Similkameen	Donegal Wilson	Conservative	2024	1
Boundary-Similkameen	Donegal Wilson	Independent (Note: Resigned from caucus September 2, 2026)	2024	1
Boundary-Similkameen	Donegal Wilson	CentreBC	2024	1
Bulkley Valley-Stikine	Sharon Hartwell	Conservative	2024	1
Burnaby Centre	**Anne Kang**	NDP	2017	3
Burnaby East	Reah Arora	NDP	2024	1
Burnaby North	Janet Routledge	NDP	2017	3
Burnaby South-Metrotown	Paul Choi	NDP	2024	1
Burnaby-New Westminster	Raj Chouhan*	NDP	2005	6
Cariboo-Chilcotin	Lorne Doerkson	Conservative	2020	2
Chilliwack North	Heather Maahs‡	Conservative	2024	1
Chilliwack-Cultus Lake	Áʼa:líya Warbus	Conservative	2024	1
Chilliwack-Cultus Lake	Áʼa:líya Warbus	Independent (Note: Resigned from caucus August 31, 2026)	2024	1
Chilliwack-Cultus Lake	Áʼa:líya Warbus	CentreBC	2024	1
Columbia River-Revelstoke	Scott McInnis	Conservative	2024	1
Columbia River-Revelstoke	Scott McInnis	Independent (Note: Resigned from caucus September 2, 2026)	2024	1
Columbia River-Revelstoke	Scott McInnis	Conservative (Note: Rejoined caucus on September 21)	2024	1
Coquitlam-Burke Mountain	**Jodie Wickens**†	NDP	2016, 2024	2*
Coquitlam-Maillardville	Jennifer Blatherwick	NDP	2024	1
Courtenay-Comox	Brennan Day	Conservative	2024	1
Courtenay-Comox	Brennan Day	Independent (Note: Resigned from caucus August 26, 2026)	2024	1
Courtenay-Comox	Brennan Day	Conservative	2024	1
Cowichan Valley	Debra Toporowski	NDP	2024	1
Delta North	**Ravi Kahlon**†	NDP	2017	3
Delta South	Ian Paton	Conservative	2017	3
Delta South	Ian Paton	Independent (Note: Resigned from caucus August 24, 2026)	2017	3
Delta South	Ian Paton	CentreBC	2017	3
Esquimalt-Colwood	Darlene Rotchford	NDP	2024	1
Fraser-Nicola	Tony Luck	Conservative	2024	1
Juan de Fuca-Malahat	Dana Lajeunesse	NDP	2024	1
Kamloops Centre	Peter Milobar	Conservative	2017	3
Kamloops Centre	Peter Milobar	Independent (Note: Resigned from caucus August 14, 2026)	2017	3
Kamloops Centre	Peter Milobar	CentreBC	2017	3
Kamloops-North Thompson	Ward Stamer	Conservative	2024	1
Kelowna Centre	Kristina Loewen	Conservative	2024	1
Kelowna-Lake Country-Coldstream	Tara Armstrong	Conservative	2024	1
Kelowna-Lake Country-Coldstream	Tara Armstrong	Independent (Note: Elected as member of the Conservatives, resigned from caucus on March 7, 2025; formed OneBC caucus with Dallas Brodie June 9, 2025)	2024	1
Kelowna-Lake Country-Coldstream	Tara Armstrong	OneBC	2024	1
Kelowna-Lake Country-Coldstream	Tara Armstrong	Independent (Note: Resigned from OneBC caucus on December 16, 2025)	2024	1
Kelowna-Mission	Gavin Dew	Conservative	2024	1
Kootenay Central	**Brittny Anderson**†	NDP	2020	2
Kootenay-Monashee	Steve Morissette	NDP	2024	1
Kootenay-Rockies	Pete Davis	Conservative	2024	1
Ladysmith-Oceanside	Stephanie Higginson	NDP	2024	1
Langford-Highlands	**Ravi Parmar**†	NDP	2023	2
Langley-Abbotsford	Harman Bhangu	Conservative	2024	1
Langley-Walnut Grove	Misty Van Popta	Conservative	2024	1
Langley-Willowbrook	Jody Toor	Conservative	2024	1
Maple Ridge East	Lawrence Mok	Conservative	2024	1
Maple Ridge-Pitt Meadows	**Lisa Beare**†	NDP	2017	3
Mid Island-Pacific Rim	**Josie Osborne**†	NDP	2020	2
Nanaimo-Gabriola Island	**Sheila Malcolmson**†	NDP	2019	3
Nanaimo-Lantzville	George Anderson	NDP	2024	1
Nechako Lakes	John Rustad	Conservative (Note: Removed from caucus on September 18, 2026)	2005	6
Nechako Lakes	John Rustad	Independent	2005	6
Nechako Lakes	John Rustad	Conservative	2005	6
New Westminster-Coquitlam	Jennifer Whiteside	NDP	2020	2
North Coast-Haida Gwaii	**Tamara Davidson**†	NDP	2024	1
North Island	Anna Kindy	Conservative	2024	1
North Vancouver-Lonsdale	**Bowinn Ma**†	NDP	2017	3
North Vancouver-Seymour	Susie Chant	NDP	2020	2
Oak Bay-Gordon Head	**Diana Gibson**†	NDP	2024	1
Peace River North	Jordan Kealy	Conservative	2024	1
Peace River North	Jordan Kealy	Independent	2024	1
Peace River South	Larry Neufeld	Conservative	2024	1
Penticton-Summerland	Amelia Boultbee	Conservative (Note: Resigned from caucus October 20, 2025; crossed the floor to join the NDP caucus on July 3, 2026)	2024	1
Penticton-Summerland	Amelia Boultbee	Independent	2024	1
Penticton-Summerland	Amelia Boultbee	NDP	2024	1
Port Coquitlam	**Mike Farnworth**†	NDP	1991, 2005	8*
Port Moody-Burquitlam	**Rick Glumac**†	NDP	2017	3
Powell River-Sunshine Coast	**Randene Neill**†	NDP	2024	1
Prince George-Mackenzie	Kiel Giddens	Conservative	2024	1
Prince George-North Cariboo	Sheldon Clare	Conservative	2024	1
Prince George-Valemount	Rosalyn Bird	Conservative (Note: Resigned from caucus August 25, 2026)	2024	1
Prince George-Valemount	Rosalyn Bird	Independent	2024	1
Prince George-Valemount	Rosalyn Bird	CentreBC	2024	1
Richmond-Bridgeport	Teresa Wat	Conservative (Note: Resigned from caucus August 26, 2026)	2013	4
Richmond-Bridgeport	Teresa Wat	Independent	2013	4
Richmond-Bridgeport	Teresa Wat	CentreBC	2013	4
Richmond Centre	Hon Chan	Conservative (Note: Removed from caucus on March 26, 2026)	2024	1
Richmond Centre	Hon Chan	Independent	2024	1
Richmond-Queensborough	Steve Kooner	Conservative	2024	1
Richmond-Steveston	**Kelly Greene**†	NDP	2020	2
Saanich North and the Islands	Rob Botterell	Green	2024	1
Saanich South	**Lana Popham**†	NDP	2009	5
Salmon Arm-Shuswap	David Williams	Conservative	2024	1
Skeena	Claire Rattée	Conservative (Note: resigned from caucus on August 27, 2026)	2024	1
Skeena	Claire Rattée	Independent	2024	1
Skeena	Claire Rattée	Conservative	2024	1
Surrey City Centre	Amna Shah	NDP	2024	1
Surrey North	Mandeep Dhaliwal	Conservative	2024	1
Surrey South	Brent Chapman	Conservative	2024	1
Surrey-Cloverdale	Elenore Sturko	Conservative (Note: Removed from caucus on September 22, 2025)	2022	2
Surrey-Cloverdale	Elenore Sturko	Independent	2022	2
Surrey-Cloverdale	Elenore Sturko	CentreBC	2022	2
Surrey-Fleetwood	**Jagrup Brar**†	NDP	2004, 2017	6*
Surrey-Guildford	**Garry Begg**†	NDP	2017	3
Surrey-Newton	**Jessie Sunner**†	NDP	2024	1
Surrey-Panorama	Bryan Tepper	Conservative	2024	1
Surrey-Serpentine River	Linda Hepner	Conservative	2024	1
Surrey-White Rock	Trevor Halford	Conservative	2020	2
Surrey-White Rock	Trevor Halford	Independent	2020	2
Surrey-White Rock	Trevor Halford	Conservative	2020	2
Vancouver-Fraserview	**George Chow**†	NDP	2017	3
Vancouver-Hastings	**Niki Sharma**†	NDP	2020	2
Vancouver-Kensington	Mable Elmore	NDP	2009	5
Vancouver-Langara	Sunita Dhir	NDP	2024	1
Vancouver-Little Mountain	**Christine Boyle**†	NDP	2024	1
Vancouver-Point Grey	**David Eby**††	NDP	2013	4
Vancouver-Quilchena	Dallas Brodie	Conservative	2024	1
Vancouver-Quilchena	Dallas Brodie	Independent	2024	1
Vancouver-Quilchena	Dallas Brodie	OneBC	2024	1
Vancouver-Quilchena	Dallas Brodie	Independent (Note: Removed as interim leader and caucus member December 13, 2025)	2024	1
Vancouver-Quilchena	Dallas Brodie	OneBC (Note: Rejoined caucus on December 21, 2025)	2024	1
Vancouver-Renfrew	**Adrian Dix**†	NDP	2005	6
Vancouver-South Granville	**Brenda Bailey**†	NDP	2020	2
Vancouver-Strathcona	Joan Phillip (Note: Died in office August 28, 2026)	NDP	2023	2
Vancouver-Strathcona		Vacant (Note: Writ for by-election not yet moved)		
Vancouver-West End	**Spencer Chandra Herbert**†	NDP	2008	6
Vancouver-Yaletown	**Terry Yung**†	NDP	2024	1
Vernon-Lumby	Harwinder Sandhu	NDP	2020	2
Victoria-Beacon Hill	**Grace Lore**†	NDP	2020	2
Victoria-Swan Lake	**Nina Krieger**†	NDP	2024	1
West Kelowna-Peachland	Macklin McCall	Conservative	2024	1
West Vancouver-Capilano	Lynne Block	Conservative	2024	1
West Vancouver-Sea to Sky	Jeremy Valeriote	Green	2024	1

== Seat changes ==
Party affiliation changed
Involuntary departure
█ CentreBC
█ Conservative
█ New Democratic
█ OneBC
█ Independent

43rd Parliament of British Columbia (2025–2026) – Membership and party affiliation changes
Electoral district	Before			Change	
Electoral district	Date	Reason	Member exited	New member	Date
Vancouver-Quilchena	March 7, 2025	Removed from caucus; formed new party	Dallas Brodie (Conservative → Independent → OneBC)		June 9, 2025
Vancouver-Quilchena	December 13, 2025	Removed from caucus; rejoined caucus	Dallas Brodie (Independent → OneBC)		December 21, 2025
Peace River North	March 7, 2025	Left caucus	Jordan Kealy (Conservative → Independent)		
Kelowna-Lake Country-Coldstream	March 7, 2025	Left caucus; formed new party	Tara Armstrong (Conservative → Independent → OneBC)		June 9, 2025
Kelowna-Lake Country-Coldstream	December 16, 2025	Left caucus	Tara Armstrong (OneBC → Independent)		
Surrey-Cloverdale	September 22, 2025	Removed from caucus; crossed floor to CentreBC	Elenore Sturko (Conservative → Independent → CentreBC)		September 18, 2026
Penticton-Summerland	October 20, 2025	Left caucus; crossed floor to the NDP	Amelia Boultbee (Conservative → Independent → New Democratic)		July 3, 2026
Richmond Centre	March 26, 2026	Removed from caucus	Hon Chan (Conservative → Independent)		
Kamloops Centre	August 14, 2026	Left caucus; crossed floor to CentreBC	Peter Milobar (Conservative → Independent → CentreBC) (Note: Rejoined the Conservatives after dissolution)		September 18, 2026
Abbotsford-Mission	August 22, 2026	Resigned to allow Kerry-Lynne Findlay to contest seat	Reann Gasper (Conservative)	Vacant	
Delta South	August 24, 2026	Left caucus; crossed floor to CentreBC	Ian Paton (Conservative → Independent → CentreBC)		September 18, 2026
Prince George-Valemount	August 25, 2026	Left caucus; crossed floor to CentreBC	Rosalyn Bird (Conservative → Independent → CentreBC)		September 18, 2026
Richmond-Bridgeport	August 26, 2026	Left caucus; crossed floor to CentreBC	Teresa Wat (Conservative → Independent → CentreBC)		September 18, 2026
Courtenay-Comox	August 26, 2026	Left caucus	Brennan Day (Conservative → Independent)		
Abbotsford South	August 27, 2026	Left caucus; crossed floor to CentreBC	Bruce Banman (Conservative → Independent → CentreBC)		September 18, 2026
Vancouver-Strathcona	August 28, 2026	Died in office	Joan Phillip (New Democratic)	Vacant	
Chilliwack-Cultus Lake	August 31, 2026	Left caucus; crossed floor to CentreBC	Áʼa꞉líya Warbus (Conservative → Independent → CentreBC)		September 18, 2026
Boundary-Similkameen	September 2, 2026	Left caucus; crossed floor to CentreBC	Donegal Wilson (Conservative → Independent → CentreBC)		September 18, 2026
Columbia River-Revelstoke	September 2, 2026	Left caucus; rejoined caucus	Scott McInnis (Conservative → Independent → Conservative)		September 21, 2026
Skeena	September 18, 2026	Removed from caucus; rejoined caucus	Claire Rattée (Conservative → Independent → Conservative)		September 21, 2026
Surrey-White Rock	September 18, 2026	Removed from caucus; rejoined caucus	Trevor Halford (Conservative → Independent → Conservative)		September 21, 2026
Nechako Lakes	September 18, 2026	Removed from caucus; rejoined caucus	John Rustad (Conservative → Independent → Conservative)		September 21, 2026
Surrey-Serpentine River	September 20, 2026	Left caucus; rejoined caucus	Linda Hepner (Conservative → Independent → Conservative)		September 21, 2026
Surrey South	September 22, 2026	Left caucus; crossed the floor to OneBC	Brent Chapman (Conservative → OneBC)		September 22, 2026

=== Membership changes ===
Number of members per party by date	2024	2025							2026														
Number of members per party by date	Oct 19	Mar 7	Jun 9	Sep 22	Oct 20	Dec 13	Dec 16	Dec 21	Mar 26	Jul 3	Aug 14	Aug 22	Aug 24	Aug 25	Aug 26	Aug 27	Aug 28	Aug 31	Sep 2	Sep 18	Sep 20	Sep 21	Sep 22
New Democratic	47									48							47						
Conservative	44	41		40	39				38		37	36	35	34	32	31		30	28	25	24	29	28
Green	2																						
CentreBC	0																			8			
OneBC	0		2			1	0	1															2
Independent	0	3	1	2	3	4	5	4	5	4	5		6	7	9	10		11	13	8	9	4	
Vacant	0											1					2						
