= Official Opposition Shadow Cabinet of the 42nd Legislative Assembly of British Columbia =

Official Opposition Shadow Cabinet of the 42nd Parliament of British Columbia
- Shadow Cabinet of British Columbia
- Date formed: December 8, 2022
- Date dissolved: September 21, 2024

People and organisations
- Opposition Leader: Kevin Falcon
- House Leader: Todd Stone
- Member party: Liberal/BC United

History
- Incoming formation: 2022 Liberal Party leadership election
- Outgoing formation: 2024 general election
- Election: 2020
- Legislature term: 42nd Parliament of British Columbia
- Predecessor: Official Opposition Shadow Cabinet of the 41st Legislative Assembly
- Successor: Official Opposition Shadow Cabinet of the 43rd Legislative Assembly

The Shadow Cabinet of the 42nd Legislative Assembly of British Columbia, comprising members of the BC United party, was announced by Opposition leader Kevin Falcon on December 8, 2022.

== List ==
Critic	Portfolio	Constituency	Duration
Caucus Officers
Kevin Falcon	Leader of Official Opposition	Vancouver-Quilchena	2022–2024
Todd Stone	Leader of the House	Kamloops-South Thompson	
Lorne Doerkson	Caucus Chair	Cariboo-Chilcotin	
Renee Merrifield	Caucus Whip	Kelowna-Mission	
Greg Kyllo	Deputy Caucus Whip	Shuswap	
Jackie Tegart	Assistant Deputy Speaker	Fraser-Nicola	
Shadow Ministers
Coralee Oakes	Advanced Education	Cariboo North	
Ian Paton	Agriculture and Food	Delta South	
Mike de Jong	Attorney General	Abbotsford West	
Jordan Sturdy	BC Ferries, Fisheries and Aquaculture	West Vancouver-Sea to Sky	
Norm Letnick	Children and Family Development	Kelowna-Lake Country	
Doug Clovechok	Columbia Basin Initiatives	Columbia River-Revelstoke	
Ellis Ross	Energy and LNG	Skeena	
Renee Merrifield	Environment and Climate Change; Citizens' Services	Kelowna-Mission	
Peter Milobar	Finance	Kamloops-North Thompson	
Mike Bernier	Forests	Peace River South	
Shirley Bond	Health, Seniors Services and Long-term Care	Prince George-Valemount	
Karin Kirkpatrick	Housing and Childcare, Autism & Accessibility, Gender Equity & Inclusion	West Vancouver-Capilano	
Trevor Halford	ICBC and Affordability; Transportation and Infrastructure	Surrey-White Rock	
Michael Lee	Indigenous Relations and Reconciliation	Vancouver-Langara	
Todd Stone	Jobs, Economic Development and Innovation	Kamloops-South Thompson	
Greg Kyllo	Deputy Whip, Labour and Skills Training	Shuswap	
Elenore Sturko	Mental Health, Addictions, Recovery and Education	Surrey South	
Tom Shypitka	Mines and Low Carbon Innovation	Kootenay East	
Teresa Wat	Multiculturalism, Anti-Racism Initiatives, Arts and Culture	Richmond North Centre	
Dan Ashton	Municipal Affairs	Penticton	
Mike Morris	Minister of Public Safety and Solicitor General	Prince George-Mackenzie	
Lorne Doerkson	Emergency Management & Climate Change Readiness, and Water, Land and Resource Stewardship	Cariboo-Chilcotin	
Dan Davies	Rural & Social Development and Poverty Reduction	Peace River North	
Ben Stewart	Tourism and Trade	Kelowna West	

== See also ==
- Official Opposition Shadow Cabinet of the 38th Legislative Assembly of British Columbia
- Official Opposition Shadow Cabinet of the 40th Legislative Assembly of British Columbia
- Cabinet of Canada
- Official Opposition (Canada)
- Shadow Cabinet
- Official Opposition Shadow Cabinet (British Columbia)
