= Brent Chapman =

Canadian politician

Member of the British Columbia Legislative Assembly for Surrey South
- In office October 19, 2024 – October 24, 2026
- Preceded by: Elenore Sturko
- Succeeded by: Megan Knight

Personal details
- Born: 1959 or 1960 (age 66–67)
- Party: OneBC (2026–present)
- Other political affiliations: BC Conservative (before 2026)
- Spouse: Kerry-Lynne Findlay (m. 1993)

Brent Chapman is a Canadian politician who served as a member of the Legislative Assembly of British Columbia representing the electoral district of Surrey South from 2024 to 2026. Initially elected as a member of the Conservative Party, he crossed the floor to OneBC in 2026. He is married to Kerry-Lynne Findlay, who formerly served as leader of the BC Conservatives.

== Early life and career ==
Chapman resides in Surrey with his wife Kerry-Lynne Findlay, a lawyer-turned politician. Together they have four adult children. He has a background in acting, producing, broadcasting, writing, and voice coaching. Some of his career highlights include acting in commercials for major brands including Coca-Cola, Sears, and Honda. He also worked as an actor with minor roles in films, including Freddy vs. Jason and The Lizzie McGuire Movie and as a small business owner.

== Political career ==
In May 2024, Chapman was nominated as the Conservative Party of British Columbia's candidate in Surrey South for the 2024 general election. The incumbent Surrey South MLA, Elenore Sturko, defected from BC United to the Conservatives and ran in nearby Surrey-Cloverdale.

During the election, Chapman repeatedly apologized for past racist comments and controversial statements listed below, after former BC Liberal MLA and current CKNW radio host Jas Johal drew attention to them.

On October 14, 2024, Chapman posted on social media that he had received legal advice not to continue commenting on his previous social media posts. Global News reporters sought to interview him at his campaign office the next day but he was unavailable for questions. When asked whether Chapman would be allowed to sit with the party caucus if elected, BC Conservative leader John Rustad explained that he would not comment further as Chapman had provided clarification on his statements, and had also hired a lawyer. He added that it was up to British Columbians to choose between Chapman or a continued New Democratic government.

Chapman went on to defeat NDP candidate Haroon Ghaffar with 58.8% of the votes, winning a seat in the Legislative Assembly of BC. He currently serves in the official opposition's shadow cabinet as the critic for Transit and ICBC.

On September 22, 2026, Chapman crossed the floor to OneBC. In a post to social media, he wrote he could not continue serving in the Conservative caucus after watching his wife "endure attacks from people she once stood beside." The move came just two days after Findlay had resigned as BC Conservative leader.

== Controversies ==
=== 2015 ===
In November, Chapman shared a video from fake news website called "Jew News" that misrepresented refugees upset with Macedonian police restrictions as refusing Red Cross packages because of the cross and being non-halal. Chapman called for a boycott of Air Canada because of its role in airlifting Syrian refugees to Canada.

Chapman also made a Facebook post describing Palestinians as "inbred walking, talking, breathing time bombs". He also described Muslims as inbred and speculated that "coexistence with Islam" was impossible. The National Council of Canadian Muslims criticized his comments as Islamophobic and the B.C. Muslim Association stated that Chapman should resign as a candidate. On October 9, 2024, Chapman issued a statement describing his past comments as "completely unacceptable" and not reflective of him today.

=== 2017 ===
In January, after Donald Trump's victory in the 2016 United States presidential election, Chapman, who had posted pro-Trump content on social media, posted a graphic indicating the proper way to commit suicide by gunshot to help "those liberals who said they would kill themselves if Trump were elected".

In February, Chapman made a social media post suggesting that the Quebec City mosque shooting, Sandy Hook Elementary School shooting, Aurora theater shooting, and the Pulse nightclub shooting were faked for political reasons. However, on October 14, 2024, Chapman tweeted saying that those shootings were real and he had been questioning the chaotic nature of reporting after such shootings.

=== 2024 ===
In August 2024, one of Chapman's campaign social media accounts reposted a meme that public health harm reduction policies were akin to the fate of the Warsaw Ghetto boy during the Holocaust.

In mid-September, Chapman said on a podcast that he believed that the United Nations was conspiring to control Canadian municipalities via contracts, citing the work of Freedom Convoy protestor Maggie Hope Braun. Chapman also said that the World Health Organization's proposed International Treaty on Pandemic Prevention, Preparedness and Response would allow it to confiscate personal property, and that the BC Conservatives had 45 to 50 people who were opposed to the treaty.

Chapman also appeared on a podcast and referred to the mainstream narrative around Canadian Indian residential school gravesites as a "massive fraud" and cult-like, comparing it to Jonestown and Charles Manson. Chapman also said that Canadians should feel proud of their national history. The Union of British Columbia Indian Chiefs condemned the comments as racist and called for Chapman to be removed as a candidate. Chapman issued a statement saying that the clip was being taken out of context and said that he "[had] an immense amount of respect and love for First Nations people and their historic suffering."

== Electoral history ==
2024 British Columbia general election: Surrey South
Party	Candidate	Votes	%	±%	Expenditures
Conservative	Brent Chapman	13,056	58.8%	–	
New Democratic	Haroon Ghaffar	9,136	41.2%	+6.1	
Total valid votes		22,192	–		
Total rejected ballots					
Turnout					
Registered voters					
Conservative notional gain from BC United		Swing		–	
Source: Elections BC

== See also ==
- 43rd Parliament of British Columbia
