= Tracy Redies =

Canadian politician

Member of the British Columbia Legislative Assembly for Surrey-White Rock
- In office May 9, 2017 – August 31, 2020
- Preceded by: Gordon Hogg
- Succeeded by: Trevor Halford

Personal details
- Party: BC Liberal
- Children: Lucy Redies, Lauren Redies, Brian Redies, Sabrina Redies

Tracy Redies is a Canadian politician, who was elected to the Legislative Assembly of British Columbia in the 2017 provincial election. She represented the electoral district of Surrey-White Rock as a member of the British Columbia Liberal Party caucus. She served as one of two Official Opposition critics for Finance.

Prior to her election to the legislature, Redies was chief executive officer of Coast Capital Savings and, before that, Executive Vice President and Head of Personal Financial Services, the personal banking and wealth management operations of, HSBC Bank Canada.

On July 29, 2020, Redies announced she would be resigning her seat that August 31 to become the new CEO of Science World.

== Electoral record ==
2017 British Columbia general election: Surrey-White Rock
Party	Candidate	Votes	%	±%	Expenditures
Liberal	Tracy Redies	14,101	49.87	-8.22	$47,304
New Democratic	Niovi Patsicakis	8,648	30.59	+2.96	$11,988
Green	Bill Marshall	4,574	16.18	+7.31	$1,549
Independent	Tom Bryant	950	3.36	–	$9,087
Total valid votes		28,273	100.00	–	
Total rejected ballots		123	0.43	+0.13	
Turnout		28,396	67.13	+2.40	
Registered voters		42,303			
Source: Elections BC
