= Megan Knight =

Canadian politician (born 1962)

Megan Knight MLA

Member of the British Columbia Legislative Assembly for Surrey South
- Incumbent
- Assumed office October 24, 2026
- Preceded by: Brent Chapman

Mayor of White Rock
- In office November 7, 2022 – November 9, 2026
- Preceded by: Darryl Walker

Parliamentary Secretary for Metro Vancouver
- Incumbent
- Assumed office November 20, 2026
- Preceded by: Office Established

Personal details
- Born: August 28, 1962 (age 64) British Columbia, Canada
- Party: BC Conservative
- Other political affiliations: Independent (2020)
- Spouse: Gary Knight
- Children: 5
- Education: University of British Columbia

Megan Knight MLA (born August 28, 1962) is a Canadian politician who has served as a member of the Legislative Assembly of British Columbia (MLA) representing the electoral district of Surrey South since 2026. She is a member of the Conservative Party. She has also served as the mayor of White Rock since 2022.

== Early career and education ==
Knight grew up in Cloverdale in a family of 14 children; her father was the RCMP officer in charge of Surrey. She graduated from Semiahmoo Secondary School and went on to attend the University of British Columbia.

== Political career ==
Knight first entered politics in the 2014 municipal elections, when she was elected to White Rock City Council. She served as a city councillor until 2018.

In the 2020 provincial election, Knight ran as an independent candidate in Surrey-White Rock, finishing fourth with 6% of the vote.

Knight returned to municipal politics in the 2022 municipal elections, defeating incumbent mayor Darryl Walker to become mayor of White Rock.

During the 2026 municipal elections, Knight initially sought re-election as mayor but subsequently withdrew from the race to contest the snap 2026 provincial election, which was called by Premier David Eby during the municipal campaign. Running as the BC Conservative candidate in Surrey South, she was elected with more than 60% of the vote.

== Personal life ==
Knight and her husband, Gary, have five children and have lived in White Rock since 1979.

== Accolades ==
In 2022, Megan received the Queen Elizabeth II Platinum Jubilee Medallion in recognition of her contributions to community service.

== Electoral history ==
2026 British Columbia general election: Surrey South
** Preliminary results — Not yet official **
Party	Candidate	Votes	%	±%
Conservative	Megan Knight	13,479	61.33	
New Democratic	Parik Tahlan	4,901	22.30	
CentreBC	Elenore Sturko	2,178	9.91	–
Green	Bill McConnell	1,122	5.11	–
Unaffiliated (Note: Endorsed by OneBC but listed as unaffiliated due to "paperwork technicalities")	Denis R Hurtubise	274	1.25	–
Total valid votes		21,954	99.89	
Total rejected ballots		24	0.11	
Turnout		21,978		
Registered voters				
Source: Elections BC
Conservative hold		Swing		+10.78

2020 British Columbia general election: Surrey-White Rock
Party	Candidate	Votes	%	±%	Expenditures
Liberal	Trevor Halford	10,718	39.51	−10.36	$57,028.20
New Democratic	Bryn Smith	10,494	38.69	+8.10	$9,021.54
Green	Beverly Hobby	3,862	14.24	−1.94	$1,442.61
Independent	Megan Knight	1,607	5.92	–	$17,304.20
Libertarian	Jason Bax	443	1.63	–	$0.00
Total valid votes		27,124	100.00	–	
Total rejected ballots		266	0.97	+0.54	
Turnout		27,390	61.23	−5.90	
Registered voters		44,733			
Liberal hold		Swing		−9.23	
Source: Elections BC
