= Claire Rattée =

Canadian politician (born 1991)

The Honourable Claire Rattée MLA

17th Deputy Premier of British Columbia
- Incumbent
- Assumed office November 20, 2026
- Premier: Lorne Doerkson
- Preceded by: Niki Sharma

Minister of Social Development
- Incumbent
- Assumed office November 20, 2026
- Premier: Lorne Doerkson
- Preceded by: Sheila Malcolmson

Member of the British Columbia Legislative Assembly for Skeena
- Incumbent
- Assumed office October 19, 2024
- Preceded by: Ellis Ross

Personal details
- Born: 1992 (age 33–34) Delta, British Columbia, Canada
- Party: BC Conservative (before 2026, 2026–present)
- Other political affiliations: Independent (2026)

Claire Rattée MLA (born 1992) is a Canadian politician who has served as the Deputy Premier of British Columbia and Minister of Social Development since 2026. A member of the Conservative Party, she has served as a member of the Legislative Assembly of British Columbia (MLA) representing the electoral district of Skeena since 2024..

Rattée briefly sat as an independent for three days in September 2026, after being expelled from the caucus along with former party leaders John Rustad and Trevor Halford. She was welcomed back into the party following the resignation of party leader Kerry-Lynne Findlay.

== Early life and career ==
Rattée was born in 1991 and raised in Delta and moved north to Kitimat, British Columbia at 19 years old in 2011. During her time in the Lower Mainland, she experienced a period of addiction and homelessness eventually recovering and receiving assistance through a treatment facility. Since moving to Kitimat, she has worked as a tattoo artist and co-owner of Arcane Arts Inc. for over 13 years.

On top of her private sector experience, she served as a Kitimat city councillor from 2014 to 2018. During her time on city council she prioritized representing struggling business owners, providing younger voters with representation, and increasing quality of life for residents of Northern BC. She made history as the youngest woman ever elected to the Kitimat city council.

Rattée's parents converted to Judaism shortly around the time she was born and she attended Christian schools in her youth. She and her three siblings consider themselves Jewish.

== Political career ==
=== 2019 and 2021 federal elections ===
Rattée was the Conservative Party of Canada candidate for the Skeena—Bulkley Valley riding in the 2019 and 2021 federal elections, both times coming second to the New Democratic Party candidate Taylor Bachrach while improving on past performances by the party. She increased the Conservative vote share from 24% to 36%.

=== 2024 provincial election ===
On January 30, 2024, Rattée was nominated as the Conservative Party of BC's candidate for Skeena. She went on to win the provincial election with 51.20% of the votes, succeeding Ellis Ross, the previous BC United representative for Skeena who stepped down to pursue a federal Conservative candidacy. Rattée is the first female MLA ever elected in this riding.

She served in the official oppositions' shadow cabinet as the Critic for Mental Health and Addictions. Her policy priorities include low-income housing, emergency weather shelters, economic shelters, combating antisemitisim, mental health and addictions, drawing on her own personal experiences to inform her advocacy. On September 18, 2026, Rattée, Trevor Halford, and John Rustad were removed from the Conservative caucus by Kerry-Lynne Findlay. Three days later, all three were welcomed back into the party following the resignation of Findlay.

== Electoral history ==
2024 British Columbia general election: Skeena
Party	Candidate	Votes	%	±%	Expenditures
Conservative	Claire Rattée	6,243	51.20%	+51.20%	
New Democratic	Sarah Zimmerman	5,419	44.44%	-0.01%	
Green	Teri Young	406	3.33%	+3.33%	
Christian Heritage	Irwin Jeffrey	125	1.03%	+1.03%	
Total valid votes		12,194	–		
Total rejected ballots					
Turnout					
Registered voters					
Source: Elections BC

2021 Canadian federal election: Skeena—Bulkley Valley
Party	Candidate	Votes	%	±%	Expenditures
New Democratic	Taylor Bachrach	15,921	42.58	+1.64	$66,931.32
Conservative	Claire Rattée	13,513	36.14	+2.90	$70,700.48
People's	Jody Craven	2,888	7.72	+5.45	$1,093.20
Liberal	Lakhwinder Jhaj	2,866	7.66	–3.92	$3,828.51
Green	Adeana Young	1,406	3.76	–4.17	$8,424.51
Christian Heritage	Rod Taylor	797	2.13	–1.13	$22,278.11
Total valid votes/expense limit		37,391	99.49	–	$131,940.03
Total rejected ballots		193	0.51	–0.13	
Turnout		37,584	55.20	–6.53	
Eligible voters		68,088			
New Democratic hold		Swing		–0.63	
Source: Elections Canada

2019 Canadian federal election: Skeena—Bulkley Valley
Party	Candidate	Votes	%	±%	Expenditures
New Democratic	Taylor Bachrach	16,944	40.94	–10.14	$88,898.68
Conservative	Claire Rattée	13,756	33.24	+8.45	$47,981.28
Liberal	Dave Birdi	4,793	11.58	–7.14	$33,176.61
Green	Mike Sawyer	3,280	7.93	+4.29	$7,326.84
Christian Heritage	Rod Taylor	1,350	3.26	+1.49	$23,458.48
People's	Jody Craven	940	2.27	–	$5,358.59
Independent	Danny Nunes	164	0.40	–	none listed
Independent	Merv Ritchie	157	0.38	–	none listed
Total valid votes/expense limit		41,384	99.36	–	$127,530.27
Total rejected ballots		267	0.64	+0.29	
Turnout		41,651	61.73	–6.53	
Eligible voters		67,474			
New Democratic hold		Swing		–9.30	
Source: Elections Canada

== See also ==
- 43rd Parliament of British Columbia
