= Harman Bhangu =

Canadian politician

The Honourable Harman Bhangu MLA

Member of the British Columbia Legislative Assembly for Langley-Abbotsford
- Incumbent
- Assumed office October 19, 2024
- Preceded by: Constituency established

Minister of State for Labour
- Incumbent
- Assumed office November 20, 2026
- Preceded by: Office Established

Personal details
- Born: Surrey, British Columbia, Canada
- Party: BC Conservative

Harman Bhangu MLA is a Canadian politician who has served as a member of the Legislative Assembly of British Columbia (MLA) representing the electoral district of Langley-Abbotsford since 2024. He is a member of the Conservative Party.

== Early life and career ==
Bhangu was born in Surrey, British Columbia, at Surrey Memorial Hospital. He is the son of first generation immigrants and resides in Langley with his wife Courtney and two young children.

Prior to entering politics, Bhangu spent 17 years in the heavy-load trucking industry.

== Political career ==
Bhangu first ran for office as the Conservative Party of British Columbia candidate in the 2022 by-election for Surrey South, placing third.

in June 2024, Bhangu won the party's nomination to be its candidate for Langley-Abbotsford in the 2024 British Columbia provincial election. He was elected to the Legislative Assembly of BC with 55.8 per cent of the vote, defeating BC New Democratic Party candidate John Aldag.

Bhangu serves in the official opposition's shadow cabinet as the Critic for Transportation. In January 2025, he advocated for government action to address issues with Highway 97 in the Okanagan, which had experienced various closures and delays. In February, he called for the Kootenay Lake Ferry to be designated as an essential service and urged Minister of Labour Jennifer Whiteside to intervene in the ongoing British Columbia General Employees' Union strike which had reduced ferry sailings from ten to three per day.

In February 2026, Bhangu announced his candidacy in the 2026 Conservative Party of British Columbia leadership election. On March 16, he withdrew from the race and endorsed Caroline Elliott.

== Electoral record ==
2026 British Columbia general election: Langley-Abbotsford
Party	Candidate	Votes	%	±%	Expenditures
Conservative	Harman Bhangu	14,455	61.46		
New Democratic	Erin Osborne	5,614	23.87		
Green	Melissa Snazell	1,994	8.48		
OneBC	Shelly Jan	1,072	4.56	—	
Libertarian	Alex Joehl	322	1.37		
Total valid votes		23,457	99.73		
Total rejected ballots		63	0.27		
Turnout		23,520			
Registered voters					
Conservative hold		Swing		+7.85	
Source: Elections BC

2024 British Columbia general election: Langley-Abbotsford
Party	Candidate	Votes	%	±%	Expenditures
Conservative	Harman Bhangu	14,341	55.65	+48.0	$64,184.86
New Democratic	John Aldag	8,691	33.73	-1.5	$32,984.54
Green	Melissa Snazell	1,434	5.56	-5.9	$425.60
Independent	Karen Long	1,104	4.28	–	$14,388.14
Libertarian	Alex Joehl	200	0.78	–	$659.35
Total valid votes/expense limit		25,770	99.74	–	$71,700.08
Total rejected ballots		66	0.26	–	
Turnout		25,836	59.46	–	
Registered voters		43,448			
Conservative notional gain from BC United		Swing		N/A (Note: Swing cannot be calculated as BC United did not run a candidate in this riding.)	
Source: Elections BC

BC Conservative Langley-Abbotsford nomination contest: June 8, 2024

Candidate
Candidate	Votes	%
Harman Bhangu	220	53.4
Shelly Jan Semmler	150	36.4
Ryan Warawa	42	10.2
Total	412	100.0

British Columbia provincial by-election, September 10, 2022: Surrey South Resignation of Stephanie Cadieux (April 30, 2022)
Party	Candidate	Votes	%	±%	Expenditures
Liberal	Elenore Sturko	5,568	51.83	+4.48	$71,826.15
New Democratic	Pauline Greaves	3,221	29.98	–13.08	$58,814.93
Conservative	Harman Bhangu	1,364	12.70	—	$38,150.18
Green	Simran Sarai	368	3.43	–6.15	$5,252.57
Libertarian	Jason Bax	221	2.06	—	$640.83
Total valid votes		10,742	99.87	—	
Total rejected ballots		14	0.13	–1.23	
Turnout		10,756	19.8	–32.94	
Registered voters		54,363			
Liberal hold		Swing		+8.78	
Source: Elections BC

== See also ==
- 43rd Parliament of British Columbia
