= Stephanie Cadieux =

Canadian politician

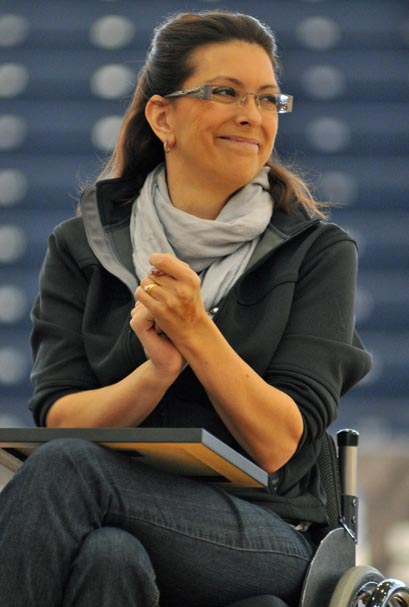

Minister of Children and Family Development
- In office September 5, 2012 – July 18, 2017
- Premier: Christy Clark
- Preceded by: Mary McNeil
- Succeeded by: Katrine Conroy

Member of the British Columbia Legislative Assembly
- In office May 12, 2009 – April 30, 2022
- Preceded by: Riding established
- Succeeded by: Elenore Sturko
- Constituency: Surrey-Panorama (2009–2013); Surrey-Cloverdale (2013–2017); Surrey South (2017–2022)

Personal details
- Born: 1972 or 1973 (age 53–54)
- Party: BC Liberal

Stephanie Cadieux OBC (born 1972 or 1973) is a Canadian politician, who was elected as a BC Liberal member of the Legislative Assembly of British Columbia in the 2009 provincial election, representing the riding of Surrey-Panorama. After the 2013 provincial election, Cadieux was elected in the riding of Surrey-Cloverdale and in the 2017 provincial election, Cadieux was elected in the riding of Surrey South. In Opposition, she served as Opposition critic for Advanced Education and as Opposition critic for Gender Equity, Accessibility, Inclusion and Sport, having previously served, when her party formed the government, as the Minister of Children and Family Development, and prior to that as Minister of Social Development, Minister of Labour, Citizens' Services and Open Government and Minister of Community, Sport and Cultural Development.

She was a member of the Select Standing Committees on Health and on Children and Youth, and a former member of the Special Committee to Review the Freedom of Information and Protection of Privacy Act.

Cadieux, formerly the director of marketing and development for the BC Paraplegic Association and manager of accessibility for 2010 Legacies Now Society. Her leadership and resourcefulness led her to be voted one of Business in Vancouver's Top 40 Under 40 for 2007. She has been a wheelchair user since a car accident at age 18. She is the second wheelchair user, following Doug Mowat, elected to the provincial legislature.

She has served as president of the Realwheels Society, ambassador for the Rick Hansen Man in Motion Foundation, a researcher and member of the advisory panel for the International Collaboration on Repair Discoveries (ICORD), a member of the Diversity Advisory Committee for Global BC and as a mentor with the YWCA.

She has travelled extensively, including to Europe, Central America, Africa and North America, some of which has been as a delegate for international development work with people with disabilities in developing countries.

She resigned from her MLA position, effective April 30, 2022, to become Canada's first Chief Accessibility Officer. She was reappointed for a further 3 year term effective May 2, 2026.

She was named to the Order of British Columbia on August 3, 2026 for "for driving lasting change in public policy and empowering people with disabilities throughout Canada and beyond."

== Electoral results ==
2020 British Columbia general election: Surrey South
Party	Candidate	Votes	%	±%	Expenditures
Liberal	Stephanie Cadieux	12,970	47.36	−3.58	$39,053.31
New Democratic	Pauline Greaves	11,794	43.06	+10.19	$7,816.81
Green	Tim Ibbotson	2,623	9.58	−2.27	$1,370.48
Total valid votes		27,387	98.64	–	
Total rejected ballots		377	1.36	+0.57	
Turnout		27,764	52.74	−7.17	
Registered voters		52,640			
Source: Elections BC
Liberal hold		Swing		-6.89	

2017 British Columbia general election: Surrey South
Party	Candidate	Votes	%	Expenditures
Liberal	Stephanie Cadieux	13,509	50.94	$46,393
New Democratic	Jonathan Silveira	8,718	32.87	$14,789
Green	Pascal Tremblay	3,141	11.84	$0
Independent	Peter Njenga	634	2.39	$7,288
Libertarian	Josh Barrett	311	1.17	$0
Independent	Gary Hee	140	0.53	$1,202
Your Political Party	Fabiola Cecilia Palomino	67	0.25	$387
Total valid votes		26,520	99.21	
Total rejected ballots		210	0.79	
Turnout		26,730	59.91	
Registered voters		44,615		
Source: Elections BC

2013 British Columbia general election: Surrey-Cloverdale
Party	Candidate	Votes	%	±%	Expenditures
Liberal	Stephanie Cadieux	18,051	59.53	-3.17	$86,812
New Democratic	Harry Kooner	8,777	28.95	-0.86	$54,929
Conservative	Howard Wu	2,545	8.39		$852
No Affiliation	Matt William Begley	949	3.13		$750
Total valid votes		30,322	99.34		
Total rejected ballots		202	0.66	+0.10	
Turnout		30,524	57.79	+2.77	
Registered voters		52,817			
Source: Elections BC
Liberal hold		Swing		-1.16	

British Columbia provincial government of Christy Clark
Cabinet posts (3)
Predecessor	Office	Successor
Ministry Established	Minister of Labour, Citizens' Services and Open Government; March 14, 2011 – September 26, 2011	Margaret MacDiarmid
Harry Bloy	Minister of Social Development; September 26, 2011 – September 5, 2012	Moira Stilwell
Mary McNeil	Minister of Children and Family Development; September 5, 2012 – July 18, 2017	Katrine Conroy
British Columbia provincial government of Gordon Campbell
Cabinet post (1)
Predecessor	Office	Successor
Ben Stewart	Minister of Community, Sport and Cultural Development; October 25, 2010 – March 14, 2011	Ida Chong
