= Ministry of Social Development and Poverty Reduction =

Provincial ministry overview
- Type: Social welfare
- Jurisdiction: province of British Columbia
- Headquarters: Victoria, British Columbia
- Minister responsible: Sheila Malcolmson

Map

The Ministry of Social Development and Poverty Reduction is a ministry of the government of British Columbia in Canada. Its mandate is to provide British Columbians in need with a system of supports to help them achieve social and economic potential.

The ministry is responsible for provincial income assistance, disability assistance, WorkBC, and low-income bus passes. Since December 7, 2022, the minister of social development and poverty reduction has been Sheila Malcolmson.
