= Rosalyn Bird =

Canadian politician

Rosalyn Bird MLA

Member of the British Columbia Legislative Assembly for Prince George-Valemount
- Incumbent
- Assumed office October 19, 2024
- Preceded by: Shirley Bond

Parliamentary secretary for Armed forces and Veterans Affairs
- Incumbent
- Assumed office November 20, 2026
- Preceded by: Darlene Rotchford

Personal details
- Party: BC Conservative (2024–2026, 2026–present)
- Other political affiliations: Independent (2026); CentreBC (2026)

Rosalyn Bird MLA is a Canadian politician who has served as a member of the Legislative Assembly of British Columbia (MLA) representing the electoral district of Prince George-Valemount since 2024. She is a member of the Conservative Party.

In September 2026, Bird briefly sat as an independent before joining CentreBC. Four days later, she rejoined the Conservative caucus after the writ was dropped in the 2026 general election.

== Early life and career ==
Rosalyn Bird began her career in the Canadian Armed Forces (CAF) in 1990. She began her service as a boatswain before reclassifying as a resource management clerk. In 2005, she was selected to commission as a naval logistics officer.

During her time in the CAF, Bird deployed in support of NATO. She also served as the forward logistics support officer for Southeast Asia relations and supported Operation Apollo and Operation Altair in Afghanistan.

== Political career ==
In the 2024 provincial election, Bird was elected as a member of the Legislative Assembly for Prince George-Valemount, representing the Conservative Party of British Columbia. After her election, Bird was named to the Conservative shadow cabinet as critic for Citizens' Services. Bird has cited internet connectivity as a priority for this portfolio, as well as the province's forestry industry, healthcare and education systems, and road safety and transportation.

Bird also served on the board of directors of the Conservative Party of British Columbia.

On August 25, 2026, Bird resigned as a member of the Conservative Party of British Columbia, the third MLA to leave the Conservative caucus in a two-week period. In September 2026, Bird joined fellow Conservative defectors Ian Paton, Peter Milobar, Áʼa꞉líya Warbus, and Bruce Banman in forming a new party. These five and three other MLAs joined CentreBC on September 18, 2026. She later rejoined the Conservative caucus along with six of the other MLA's.

== Electoral history ==
2026 British Columbia general election: Prince George-Valemount
Party	Candidate	Votes	%	±%	Expenditures
Conservative	Rosalyn Bird	6,965	50.34		
New Democratic	Carol Bourque	4,111	29.71		
Green	Jodie Capling	1,655	11.96		
OneBC	Mitchell Lukoni	1,076	7.78	—	
Total valid votes		13,807	99.79		
Total rejected ballots		29	0.21		
Turnout		13,836			
Registered voters					
Conservative hold		Swing		+4.94	
Source: Elections BC

2024 British Columbia general election: Prince George-Valemount
Party	Candidate	Votes	%	±%	Expenditures
Conservative	Rosalyn Bird	9,018	55.19	+55.1	$45,251.88
New Democratic	Clay Pountney	5,709	34.94	+5.9	$8,295.36
Green	Gwen Johansson	1,612	9.87	-6.0	$1,311.38
Total valid votes/expense limit		16,339	99.74	–	$71,700.08
Total rejected ballots		43	0.26	–	
Turnout		16,382	53.60	–	
Registered voters		30,564			
Conservative notional gain from BC United		Swing		N/A (Note: Swing cannot be calculated as BC United did not run a candidate in this riding.)	
Source: Elections BC

== See also ==
- 43rd Parliament of British Columbia
