= Langley-Abbotsford (provincial electoral district) =

Provincial electoral district in British Columbia, Canada

British Columbia electoral district
- Interactive map of riding boundaries

Provincial electoral district
- Legislature: Legislative Assembly of British Columbia
MLA
Harman Bhangu
Conservative
- District created: 2023
- First contested: 2024
- Last contested: 2026

Demographics
- Population (2021): 56,458
- Area (km²): 283
- Pop. density (per km²): 199.5
- Census division(s): Fraser Valley, Metro Vancouver
- Census subdivision(s): Abbotsford (part), Langley (part), Matsqui 4

Langley-Abbotsford is a provincial electoral district for the Legislative Assembly of British Columbia.

Created under the 2021 British Columbia electoral redistribution, the district was first contested in the 2024 general election. It was created out of parts of Langley, Langley East, Abbotsford West, and Abbotsford South.

== Demographics ==
Population, 2021	56,458
Area (km^{2})	283
Pop. density (people per km^{2})	199
Source: BC Electoral Boundaries Commission

== Geography ==
Located in the Fraser Valley, the district comprises most of the Township of Langley and the western part of Abbotsford, including Murrayville, Fern Ridge, Glen Valley and Aldergrove. It is bordered by the Canada–United States border to the south and the Fraser River to the north.

== Members of the Legislative Assembly ==
This riding has elected the following members of the Legislative Assembly:

Assembly	Years	Member	Party
Langley-Abbotsford; Riding created from Abbotsford South, Abbotsford West, Langley and Langley East
43rd	2024–2026	Harman Bhangu	Conservative
44th	2026–present	Harman Bhangu	Conservative

== Election results ==
2026 British Columbia general election
The 2026 general election will be held on October 24.
Party	Candidate	Votes	%	±%	Expenditures
Green	Melissa Snazell				
Libertarian	Alex Joehl				
OneBC	Shelly Jan				
Conservative	Harman Bhangu				
New Democratic	Erin Osborne				
Total valid votes					
Total rejected ballots					
Turnout					
Registered voters					
Source: Elections BC

2024 British Columbia general election
Party	Candidate	Votes	%	±%	Expenditures
Conservative	Harman Bhangu	14,341	55.65	+48.0	$64,184.86
New Democratic	John Aldag	8,691	33.73	-1.5	$32,984.54
Green	Melissa Snazell	1,434	5.56	-5.9	$425.60
Independent	Karen Long	1,104	4.28	–	$14,388.14
Libertarian	Alex Joehl	200	0.78	–	$659.35
Total valid votes/expense limit		25,770	99.74	–	$71,700.08
Total rejected ballots		66	0.26	–	
Turnout		25,836	59.46	–	
Registered voters		43,448			
Conservative notional gain from BC United		Swing		N/A (Note: Swing cannot be calculated as BC United did not run a candidate in this riding.)	
Source: Elections BC

2020 provincial election redistributed results
Party	%
Liberal	42.8
New Democratic	35.2
Green	11.5
Conservative	7.6

== Nomination contests ==
BC Conservative Langley-Abbotsford nomination contest: June 8, 2024

Candidate
Candidate	Votes	%
Harman Bhangu	220	53.4
Shelly Jan Semmler	150	36.4
Ryan Warawa	42	10.2
Total	412	100.0

== See also ==
- List of British Columbia provincial electoral districts
- Canadian provincial electoral districts
