= Áʼa꞉líya Warbus =

Canadian politician

The Honourable Áʼa:líya Warbus MLA
- Warbus in 2026

Minister of Environment
- Incumbent
- Assumed office November 20, 2026
- Premier: Lorne Doerkson
- Preceded by: Tamara Davidson

Opposition House Leader of British Columbia
- In office November 20, 2024 – June 29, 2026
- Leader: John Rustad; Trevor Halford (interim); Kerry-Lynne Findlay
- Preceded by: Todd Stone
- Succeeded by: Sheldon Clare

Member of the British Columbia Legislative Assembly for Chilliwack-Cultus Lake
- Incumbent
- Assumed office October 19, 2024
- Preceded by: Constituency established

Personal details
- Born: Theresa Keliya Point; 1984 or 1985 (age 40–41)
- Party: BC Conservative (2024–2026, 2026–present)
- Other political affiliations: Independent (2026); CentreBC (2026)
- Spouse: Kalvin Warbus
- Parent: Steven Point (father)
- Other names: Theresa Point; Theresa Warbus-Point; Apt Exact; Keliya

Áʼa:líya Theresa Warbus MLA (née Point; born 1984 or 1985) is a Canadian politician who has served as the Minister of Environment of British Columbia since 2026. A member of the Conservative Party, she has served as a member of the Legislative Assembly of British Columbia (MLA) representing the electoral district of Chilliwack-Cultus Lake since 2024. She previously served as the Opposition House Leader in the legislature from 2024 to 2026.

Warbus is the daughter of Steven Point, a former lieutenant governor of British Columbia. She is a member of the Stó꞉lō nation, the first Stó꞉lō person to be elected in British Columbia. Warbus describes her beliefs as being part of the "progressive conservative movement". Upon being elected, she was appointed the Conservative Party's house leader by John Rustad, a position she held until 2026.

Warbus briefly left the Conservative Party to sit as an independent in August 2026 before joining CentreBC in September. Four days later, she rejoined the Conservative caucus on September 22.

Prior to being elected, Warbus was an artist, filmmaker, and singer. She served as professor at Capilano University's Indigenous digital film department and as the Indigenous artist-in-residence for Kwantlen Polytechnic University. Ahead of her election, she was working as the Director of Cultural Communications at the Stó꞉lō Xwexwilmexw Government. Alongside her husband, Kalvin Warbus, she runs the film production studio Salish Legends Media. Warbus previously performed under the stage names Keliya, Apt Exact, and T Mela_D, the latter two while she was in the hip hop group Rapsure Risin'.

== Early life and education ==
Warbus was born Theresa Alexis Point. She is the daughter of former lieutenant governor of British Columbia Steven Point and his wife Gwendolyn Point. Warbus is Stó꞉lō, from the Skowkale First Nation. In a conversation with Future Pathways' Fireside Chats series, Warbus stated that when she was "very young", she moved away from her family to live in Alberta. While in Alberta, she struggled with alcohol abuse and eventually suffered a breakdown which led her to move back in with her parents.

Warbus later moved to the city of Vancouver and undertook a program related to youth and theatre. In 2007, Warbus was among the students included in the first Aboriginal Youth Internship Program sponsored by the government of British Columbia, where she worked in the Ministry of Children and Family Development and furthering her work in Vancouver's Knowledgeable Aboriginal Youth Association (KAYA). While in Vancouver, she began her career in music and was struggling with an abusive relationship which "ate a big chunk" of her twenties. In 2016, Warbus led the Native youth mentorship program held at the University of British Columbia's Museum of Anthropology.

Warbus was in various educational paths for her post-secondary career, with "close to" 10 years of training in various fields. Initially studying general studies, she entered into an English major with an intention towards law, then theatre school, audio engineering, and finally film production. She has a Master of Fine Arts in film production from the University of British Columbia. While at the University of British Columbia, she served as a student ambassador, completing her Bachelor of Fine Arts degree in film production in 2018. She had initially intended to go attend the university for psychology, but then attended the University of the Fraser Valley's Lens of Empowerment program and became interested in filmmaking. Warbus was the director of Slhá꞉lí (Woman), a biographical film of the Stó꞉lō transgender woman Saylesh Wesley, which she completed in partial fulfillment for her master's degree in film production in 2022.

Warbus has worked as a professor at Capilano University in its Indigenous digital film department, and served as the Indigenous artist-in-residence for Kwantlen Polytechnic University. She was among the artists featured in the 2019 exhibit featuring Fraser Valley artists at The Reach Gallery Museum. Alongside her husband, Warbus runs the media company Salish Legends Media. Warbus worked as a writer on Loretta Todd's Indigenous superhero webseries Fierce Girls. Before her election as MLA for Chilliwack-Cultus Lake, Warbus worked as Director of Cultural Communications at the Stó꞉lō Xwexwilmexw Government.

== Political career ==
Warbus was nominated as the Conservative Party of British Columbia's candidate for the riding of Chilliwack-Cultus Lake on March 1, 2024. Warbus succeeded Michael Geoghegan, the original Conservative Party candidate for the riding, who withdrew for health reasons. Geoghegan, who worked in the Stó꞉lō Nation's economic development arm, recruited Warbus, who worked on the board of directors at the time, and arranged a meeting between her and John Rustad. Warbus stated that following that conversation, she felt convinced that her perspective would be heard. She cited her criticism of the Eby government's policy regarding safe supply of opioids, describing it as a "genocide of our most vulnerable".

Warbus defeated incumbent British Columbia New Democratic Party MLA Kelli Paddon during the 2024 British Columbia general election by ten percent. Upon her victory, she emphasized cost of living, homelessness, opposition to the NDP government's drug policy, and getting "the budget back on track". Warbus was one of four Indigenous women elected to the BC Legislature in the 2024 election, tied with the 2017 election for the most Indigenous candidates elected. When elected, Warbus became the first Stó꞉lō person elected to the legislature. In a speech to the BC Legislature, her father Steven Point, described her election as having taken up his offer to come "off the reservations and participate in the political life of this country."

On November 20, 2024, Warbus was designated the Conservative Party's House Leader by Rustad, with him describing her appointment as "historic".

On August 31, 2026, Warbus left the Conservative caucus to sit as an independent citing concerns with the leadership of Kerry-Lynne Findlay. She was the seventh defection in August.

On September 4, 2026, Warbus joined fellow Conservative defectors Ian Paton, Peter Milobar, Bruce Banman, and Rosalyn Bird in forming a new party. After Milobar became leader of CentreBC, Warbus and six other MLAs joined the party. Four days later, she and six of the other former Conservative MLAs rejoined the Conservative caucus after Premier David Eby called a snap election.

=== Political positions ===
Warbus described herself as being part of the "new progressive conservative movement" built by John Rustad, and described her views as "a very left perspective." Warbus stated that she saw herself as a "bridge" between communities divided on contentious issues, and that she brings the ability to "help the party and province manage these controversial issues to benefit everyone." She described herself as finding alignment with Rustad's big ticket items, specifically with regards to the NDP government's response to the drug epidemic.

Speaking with The Chilliwack Progress, she cited the "complete failure" by the BC NDP to address the drug epidemic, along with public safety issues as reasons which drove her to run. She expressed opposition to the provincial carbon tax, citing it as a factor in food and gas affordability for working families.

With regards to DRIPA, the BC government's implementation of the United Nations Declaration on the Rights of Indigenous Peoples, she agreed that it may not be the proper framework to underlay Indigenous-government relations in BC. She criticized a claimed veto power given to First Nations, which was at odds with the interpretation by the Union of British Columbia Indian Chiefs' interpretation. Warbus emphasized that the rights under DRIPA should be preserved. Warbus was among the Vancouver protesters following the verdict of the Colten Boushie case in 2018, and questioned if the verdict would have been the same if the victim was a white man.

Regarding gender issues, Warbus expressed concern that she and Rustad would face conflict over the topic. Warbus believes that the 2SLGBTQ+ community needs to "meet on middle ground" and emphasized that some members of the public may need time to adjust to changing perspectives with regards to gender issues. She believes that sexual orientation and gender identity (SOGI) related educational materials and policy have become divisive issues.

== Personal life ==
Warbus is a mother of three, and is married to Lummi Nation member Kalvin Warbus. Warbus currently lives in the Skowkale First Nation. She is a regular participant of the CrossFit Games. Warbus and her husband are both active canoe racers with the Star Nation Canoe Club. In 2011, she was the emcee for the Peace Walk through Chilliwack during National Addictions Awareness Week.

She previously worked as a hip-hop artist who performed under the moniker "Keliya". She was the recipient of a $10,000 Telus Storyhive grant to perform her music video Take Us. She was also part of the Stó꞉lō hip-hop group Rapsure Risin', where she performed under the monikers "Apt Exact" and "T Mela_D", alongside Carrielynn Victor who went by "Num!nouS". Warbus recalled her initial reception as having been described as "not gangster." The duo was the subject of the documentary Rapsure Risin by Damien Bouchard for RedwireTV. Warbus was the host of the second Annual International Indigenous Hip Hop Awards in 2022.

== Filmography ==
Year	Title	Notes	Ref.
2019	The Roundhouse	As Theresa Point-Warbus	
2021	Slhá:lí (Woman)		

== Electoral record ==
2026 British Columbia general election: Chilliwack-Cultus Lake
Party	Candidate	Votes	%	±%	Expenditures
Conservative	Áʼa꞉líya Warbus	13,399	59.74	+5.16	
New Democratic	Kelli Paddon	9,028	40.26	–5.16	
Total valid votes		22,427	99.60	–	
Total rejected ballots		90	0.40	+0.07	
Turnout		22,517			
Registered voters		43,872			
Conservative hold		Swing		+5.16	
Source: Elections BC

2024 British Columbia general election: Chilliwack-Cultus Lake
Party	Candidate	Votes	%	±%	Expenditures
Conservative	Áʼa꞉líya Warbus	13,656	54.58	+51.8	$35,136.46
New Democratic	Kelli Paddon	11,366	45.42	+8.2	$37,560.31
Total valid votes/expense limit		25,022	99.67	–	$71,700.08
Total rejected ballots		83	0.33	–	
Turnout		25,105	60.37	–	
Registered voters		41,587			
Conservative notional gain from New Democratic		Swing		+21.8	
Source: Elections BC
