= Elenore Sturko =

Canadian politician

- Sturko in 2026

Leader of CentreBC
- In office September 22, 2026 – November 13, 2026
- Preceded by: Peter Milobar
- Succeeded by: Mike Bernier

Member of the British Columbia Legislative Assembly
- In office October 19, 2024 – October 24, 2026
- Preceded by: Mike Starchuk
- Succeeded by: Nicholas Cartmell
- Constituency: Surrey-Cloverdale
- In office September 10, 2022 – October 19, 2024
- Preceded by: Stephanie Cadieux
- Succeeded by: Brent Chapman
- Constituency: Surrey South

Personal details
- Party: CentreBC (2026–present)
- Other political affiliations: BC United (2022–2024); BC Conservative (2024–2025); Independent (2025–2026)
- Spouse: Melissa Sturko
- Children: 3

Elenore Sturko is a Canadian politician and former police officer who has served as the leader of CentreBC from September until November 2026, leading the party through the 2026 British Columbia general election. She served as a member of the Legislative Assembly of British Columbia (MLA) representing the electoral districts of Surrey South from 2022 to 2024 and Surrey-Cloverdale from 2024 to 2026.

Initially elected as a member of the BC Liberal Party, later renamed BC United, Sturko crossed the floor to the BC Conservatives in 2024. After being removed from the Conservative caucus in 2025, she sat as an independent before joining CentreBC in 2026. She became its leader four days later, when the other seven MLAs who had joined the party returned to the Conservatives.

== Early career and education ==
Sturko graduated from Kamloops Senior Secondary, then entered the broadcasting industry by joining CFJC-TV in Kamloops. She became a reservist with the Canadian Forces Air Command in 2007, serving with the Yellowknife-based 440 Transport Squadron.

She joined the Royal Canadian Mounted Police (RCMP) in 2009, eventually earning the rank of sergeant. She initially served in Langley before transferring to Yellowknife in 2012, working as a frontline police officer and later as a community policing and media relations officer. She travelled extensively in northern Canada, working with Indigenous communities and participating in the Arctic Sovereignty Patrol.

Sturko and her family moved to Ottawa in 2016, where she joined the RCMP Musical Ride and participated in its 2017 cross-country tour celebrating Canada's 150th anniversary. Stationed in Surrey from 2018, she became a spokesperson for the Surrey RCMP. Throughout her career she served as an advisor on issues related to gender, sexual orientation and harassment.

== Political career ==
=== BC Liberals and BC United ===
Following Stephanie Cadieux's resignation as Surrey South's MLA, Sturko was approached by BC Liberal leader Kevin Falcon to run as the party's candidate. She was elected to the legislature in the September 2022 by-election. She was named the official opposition education critic that October, and became shadow minister for Mental Health, Addiction, Recovery and Education that December.

=== BC Conservatives and independent MLA ===
On June 3, 2024, Sturko announced her decision to leave BC United and sit as a member of the BC Conservatives, becoming the party's fourth MLA. She contested Surrey-Cloverdale in that October's provincial election, defeating New Democratic Party incumbent Mike Starchuk. She was named to Conservative leader John Rustad's shadow cabinet that November as critic for Solicitor General and Public Safety.

A leaked letter signed by 13 Conservative MLAs criticizing Sturko exposed a rift within the party weeks after it became the official opposition. The letter raised concerns about comments Sturko made on November 23, 2024, supporting the Vancouver Police Board's acceptance of vice-chair Comfort Sakoma-Fadugba's resignation following controversial social media posts. The signatories described Sakoma-Fadugba as a victim of cancel culture and asked Rustad to have Sturko send her a written apology. Sturko said she had no plans to change her statement.

On September 22, 2025, Rustad removed Sturko from the Conservative caucus, and she became an independent MLA. She said she had been prevented from expressing her more socially liberal beliefs while with the Conservatives.

=== CentreBC leadership ===
Sturko joined seven other former Conservative MLAs in joining CentreBC on September 18, 2026, with Peter Milobar becoming party leader. On September 22, Milobar and the other six MLAs returned to the Conservatives following Kerry-Lynne Findlay's resignation as Conservative leader and the calling of a snap election. Sturko remained with CentreBC and became its leader and sole incumbent MLA.

Under Sturko, CentreBC recruited former BC Green Party leader Andrew Weaver as its candidate in Oak Bay-Gordon Head. Sturko contested Surrey South, which she had previously represented, rather than seeking re-election in Surrey-Cloverdale. She finished third behind Conservative Megan Knight and New Democrat Parik Tahlan in the October 24 election. CentreBC failed to win any seats. Sturko resigned as leader on November 13, 2026.

== Personal life ==
Sturko lives in Surrey with her wife, Melissa, and their three children.

== Electoral history ==
2026 British Columbia general election: Surrey South
** Preliminary results — Not yet official **
Party	Candidate	Votes	%	±%
Conservative	Megan Knight	13,479	61.33	
New Democratic	Parik Tahlan	4,901	22.30	
CentreBC	Elenore Sturko	2,178	9.91	–
Green	Bill McConnell	1,122	5.11	–
Unaffiliated (Note: Endorsed by OneBC but listed as unaffiliated due to "paperwork technicalities")	Denis R Hurtubise	274	1.25	–
Total valid votes		21,954	99.89	
Total rejected ballots		24	0.11	
Turnout		21,978		
Registered voters				
Source: Elections BC
Conservative hold		Swing		+10.78

2024 British Columbia general election: Surrey-Cloverdale
Party	Candidate	Votes	%	±%	Expenditures
Conservative	Elenore Sturko	10,268	48.3%	+44.82	
New Democratic	Mike Starchuk	9,681	45.6%	–6.5	
Green	Pat McCutcheon	1,150	5.4%	–3.3	
Freedom	Judy Meilleur	153	0.7%		
Total valid votes		21,252	–		
Total rejected ballots					
Turnout					
Registered voters					
Conservative gain from New Democratic		Swing		+44.82	
Source: Elections BC

British Columbia provincial by-election, September 10, 2022: Surrey South Resignation of Stephanie Cadieux (April 30, 2022)
Party	Candidate	Votes	%	±%	Expenditures
Liberal	Elenore Sturko	5,568	51.83	+4.48	$71,826.15
New Democratic	Pauline Greaves	3,221	29.98	–13.08	$58,814.93
Conservative	Harman Bhangu	1,364	12.70	—	$38,150.18
Green	Simran Sarai	368	3.43	–6.15	$5,252.57
Libertarian	Jason Bax	221	2.06	—	$640.83
Total valid votes		10,742	99.87	—	
Total rejected ballots		14	0.13	–1.23	
Turnout		10,756	19.8	–32.94	
Registered voters		54,363			
Liberal hold		Swing		+8.78	
Source: Elections BC
