= Surrey-White Rock =

Provincial electoral district in British Columbia, Canada

British Columbia electoral district
- Interactive map of riding boundaries

Provincial electoral district
- Legislature: Legislative Assembly of British Columbia
MLA
Trevor Halford
Conservative
- First contested: 1991
- Last contested: 2026

Demographics
- Population (2021): 59,586
- Area (km²): 68
- Pop. density (per km²): 876.3
- Census division: Metro Vancouver
- Census subdivision(s): Surrey (part), White Rock, Semiahmoo

Surrey-White Rock is a provincial electoral district for the Legislative Assembly of British Columbia, Canada. During the 2008 re-distribution of riding boundaries, Surrey-White Rock kept the majority of its existing region.

== Demographics ==
Population, 2021	59,586
Area (km^{2})	68
Pop. Density (people per km^{2})	876
Source: BC Electoral Boundaries Commission

== Geography ==
The riding is bounded on the south and west by Semiahmoo Bay, on the east by Highway 99, and on the north by 24th Avenue. The riding contains the southwest corner of Surrey, the city of White Rock, and the Semiahmoo Indian Reserve.

== Members of the Legislative Assembly ==
This riding has elected the following members of the Legislative Assembly:

Assembly	Years	Member	Party
Surrey-White Rock; Riding created from Surrey-White Rock-Cloverdale
35th	1991–1996	Wilf Hurd	Liberal
36th	1996–1997	Wilf Hurd	Liberal
36th	1997–2001	Gordon Hogg	Liberal
37th	2001–2005	Gordon Hogg	Liberal
38th	2005–2009	Gordon Hogg	Liberal
39th	2009–2013	Gordon Hogg	Liberal
40th	2013–2017	Gordon Hogg	Liberal
41st	2017–2020	Tracy Redies	Liberal
42nd	2020–2023	Trevor Halford	Liberal
42nd	2023–2024	Trevor Halford	BC United
42nd	2024–2024	Trevor Halford	Conservative
43rd	2024–2026	Trevor Halford	Conservative
43rd	2026–2026	Trevor Halford	Independent
43rd	2026–present	Trevor Halford	Conservative

The current MLA is Trevor Halford. He was elected in 2020. The previous MLA was Tracy Redies, first elected in 2017, she was the former CEO of Coast Capital Savings and is now the CEO for Science World. And before Redies was Gordon Hogg, a former mayor of White Rock first elected in a 1997 by-election. Hogg and Redies represented the BC Liberals, while Halford, representing BC United, defected to the Conservatives.

== Election results ==
2026 British Columbia general election
Party	Candidate	Votes	%	±%	Expenditures
Conservative	Trevor Halford	15,402	57.83		
New Democratic	Darryl Walker	7,744	29.08		
Green	Christine Kinnie	2,055	7.72	—	
OneBC	Amanda James	635	2.38	—	
CentreBC	Waqas Rana	556	2.09	—	
Independent	Kevin Diakiw	196	0.74	—	
Total valid votes		26,588	99.83		
Total rejected ballots		44	0.17		
Turnout		26,632			
Registered voters					
Conservative hold		Swing		+11.10	
Source: Elections BC

2024 British Columbia general election
Party	Candidate	Votes	%	±%	Expenditures
Conservative	Trevor Halford	14,667	52.3%	–	
New Democratic	Darryl Walker	12,699	45.3%	+6.61	
Libertarian	Damyn Tassie	671	2.4%	+0.77	
Total valid votes		28,037	–		
Total rejected ballots					
Turnout					
Registered voters					
Conservative gain from BC United		Swing		–	
Source: Elections BC
Note:Trevor Halford was elected as a Liberal (BC United) in 2020, but crossed the floor to the Conservatives on September 3, 2024.

2020 British Columbia general election
Party	Candidate	Votes	%	±%	Expenditures
Liberal	Trevor Halford	10,718	39.51	−10.36	$57,028.20
New Democratic	Bryn Smith	10,494	38.69	+8.10	$9,021.54
Green	Beverly Hobby	3,862	14.24	−1.94	$1,442.61
Independent	Megan Knight	1,607	5.92	–	$17,304.20
Libertarian	Jason Bax	443	1.63	–	$0.00
Total valid votes		27,124	100.00	–	
Total rejected ballots		266	0.97	+0.54	
Turnout		27,390	61.23	−5.90	
Registered voters		44,733			
Liberal hold		Swing		−9.23	
Source: Elections BC

2017 British Columbia general election
Party	Candidate	Votes	%	±%	Expenditures
Liberal	Tracy Redies	14,101	49.87	-8.22	$47,304
New Democratic	Niovi Patsicakis	8,648	30.59	+2.96	$11,988
Green	Bill Marshall	4,574	16.18	+7.31	$1,549
Independent	Tom Bryant	950	3.36	–	$9,087
Total valid votes		28,273	100.00	–	
Total rejected ballots		123	0.43	+0.13	
Turnout		28,396	67.13	+2.40	
Registered voters		42,303			
Source: Elections BC

B.C. General Election 2013: Surrey-White Rock
Party	Candidate	Votes	%	±%
Liberal	Gordon Hogg	15,092	58.09%	-3.96%
New Democratic	Susan Keeping	7,180	27.63%	+0.27%
Green	Don Pitcairn	2,304	8.87%	+0.18%
Conservative	Elizabeth Pagtakhan	1,301	5.01%	-
British Columbia Party	Jim Laurence	105	0.40%	-
Total Valid Votes		25,982	99.7%	
Total Rejected Ballots		74	0.3%	
Turnout		26,056	64.73%	

2009 British Columbia general election
Party	Candidate	Votes	%	±%
Liberal	Gordon Hogg	15,121	62.05	+4.19
New Democratic	Drina Allen	6,668	27.36	+0.96
Green	Don Pitcairn	2,118	8.69	−2.03
Reform	David Charles Hawkins	464	1.90	
Total		24,371	100.00	
Source:"2009 Official Election Results for Surrey-White Rock". Elections BC. June 5, 2009.

2005 British Columbia general election
Party	Candidate	Votes	%	±%
Liberal	Gordon Hogg	16,462	57.86	−10.84
New Democratic	Moh Chelali	7,511	26.40	+13.24
Green	Ashley Brie Hughes	3,051	10.72	−2.44
Conservative	David James Evans	1,340	4.71	
Democratic Reform	Ronald Edward Dunsford	87	0.31	
Total		28,451	100.00	

B.C. General Election 2001: Surrey-White Rock
Party	Candidate	Votes	%	±	Expenditures
Liberal	Gordon J. Hogg	18,678	68.70%	+10.66%	$46,685
Green	Ruth Christine	3,577	13.16%	+10.98%	$2,700
NDP	Matt Todd	3,415	12.56%	-13.87%	$5,509
Unity	Garry Sahl	983	3.62%	-	
Marijuana	David Bourgeois	536	1.96%	-	$394
Total valid votes		27,189	100.00%		
Total rejected ballots		91	0.33%		
Turnout		27,280	77.64%		

Byelection September 15, 1997: Surrey-White Rock
Party	Candidate	Votes	%	±	Expenditures
Liberal	Gordon Hogg	10,497	51.73%	-6.31%	
Reform	David Secord	5,298	26.11%	+18.01%	
New Democratic	David Thompson	2,520	12.42%	-14.01%	
Green	Stuart Parker	910	4.49%	+2.31%	
Progressive Democrat	Bill Gardner	876	4.27%	+0.70%	
Family Coalition	Jim Hessels	198	0.98%	-	
Total valid votes		20,290	100.00%		
Total rejected ballots		32			
Turnout		20,322			

B.C. General Election 1996: Surrey-White Rock
Party	Candidate	Votes	%	±	Expenditures
Liberal	Wilf Hurd	18,039	58.04%	+19.20%	$43,193
NDP	David Thompson	8,215	26.43%	-5.55%	$46,434
Reform	David Secord	2,519	8.10%	-	$22,924
Progressive Democrat	Ahmad Bajwa	1,110	3.57%	-	$100
Green	Steve Chitty	677	2.18%	-	$400
Independent	Kathy Burden	295	0.95%	-	
Social Credit	Rick Post	226	0.73%	-27.71%	$3,395
Total valid votes		31,081	100.00%		
Total rejected ballots		118	0.38%		
Turnout		31,199	75.89%		

B.C. General Election 1991: Surrey-White Rock
Party	Candidate	Votes	%	±	Expenditures
Liberal	Wilf Hurd	11,008	38.84%		$7,291
NDP	Donna Osatiuk	9,063	31.98%		$28,721
Social Credit	Chip Barrett	8,062	28.44%	–	$54,719
Conservative	Bill Smith	209	0.74%		$1,188
Total valid votes		28,342	100.00%		
Total rejected ballots		540	1.50%		
Turnout		28,882	80.36%		

== Notes ==
Formerly known as the BC Liberals until 2023.

== See also ==
- List of British Columbia provincial electoral districts
- Canadian provincial electoral districts

Legislative Assembly of British Columbia
Preceded by Nechako Lakes	Constituency represented by the leader of the Opposition; 2025–present	Incumbent
