= Surrey South =

Provincial electoral district in British Columbia, Canada

British Columbia electoral district
- Interactive map of riding boundaries

Provincial electoral district
- Legislature: Legislative Assembly of British Columbia
MLA
Megan Knight
Conservative
- District created: 2015
- First contested: 2017
- Last contested: 2026

Demographics
- Population (2021): 56,867
- Area (km²): 122
- Pop. density (per km²): 466.1
- Census division: Metro Vancouver
- Census subdivision: Surrey (part)

Surrey South is a provincial electoral district in British Columbia that has been represented in the Legislative Assembly of British Columbia since 2017.

Created under the 2015 British Columbia electoral redistribution, the riding was first contested in the 2017 general election. It was created out of parts of Surrey-Cloverdale and Surrey-Panorama.

== Demographics ==
Population, 2021	56,867
Area (km^{2})	122
Pop. Density (people per km^{2})	466
Source: BC Electoral Boundaries Commission

== Geography ==
The district encompasses the southern portion of the City of Surrey, including the neighbourhoods of Panorama Ridge, Crescent, Grandview Heights, Hazelmere and Douglas.

It is bounded by Delta to the west, the Township of Langley to the east, the Canada–United States border to the south, and 56th Avenue, King George Boulevard and 58th Avenue to the north.

== Members of the Legislative Assembly ==
This riding has elected the following members of the Legislative Assembly:

Assembly	Years	Member	Party
Surrey South; Riding created from Surrey-Cloverdale and Surrey-Panorama
41st	2017–2020	Stephanie Cadieux	Liberal
42nd	2020–2022	Stephanie Cadieux	Liberal
42nd	2022–2023	Elenore Sturko	Liberal
42nd	2023–2024	Elenore Sturko	BC United
42nd	2024–2024	Elenore Sturko	Conservative
43rd	2024–2026	Brent Chapman	Conservative
43rd	2026–2026	Brent Chapman	OneBC
44th	2026–present	Megan Knight	Conservative

== Election results ==
2026 British Columbia general election
** Preliminary results — Not yet official **
Party	Candidate	Votes	%	±%
Conservative	Megan Knight	12,557	61.39	+2.56
New Democratic	Parik Tahlan	4,535	22.17	-19.00
CentreBC	Elenore Sturko	2,074	10.14	–
Green	Bill McConnell	1,021	4.99	–
Unaffiliated	Denis R Hurtubise	266	1.30	–
Total valid votes		20,453	99.94	
Total rejected ballots		13	0.06	-0.47
Turnout		20,466		
Registered voters				
Source: Elections BC
Conservative hold		Swing		+10.78

2024 British Columbia general election
Party	Candidate	Votes	%	±%	Expenditures
Conservative	Brent Chapman	13,056	58.8%	–	
New Democratic	Haroon Ghaffar	9,136	41.2%	+6.1	
Total valid votes		22,192	–		
Total rejected ballots					
Turnout					
Registered voters					
Conservative notional gain from BC United		Swing		–	
Source: Elections BC

2020 provincial election redistributed results
Party	%
Liberal	55.4
New Democratic	35.1
Green	9.3

British Columbia provincial by-election, September 10, 2022 Resignation of Stephanie Cadieux (April 30, 2022)
Party	Candidate	Votes	%	±%	Expenditures
Liberal	Elenore Sturko	5,568	51.83	+4.48	$71,826.15
New Democratic	Pauline Greaves	3,221	29.98	–13.08	$58,814.93
Conservative	Harman Bhangu	1,364	12.70	—	$38,150.18
Green	Simran Sarai	368	3.43	–6.15	$5,252.57
Libertarian	Jason Bax	221	2.06	—	$640.83
Total valid votes		10,742	99.87	—	
Total rejected ballots		14	0.13	–1.23	
Turnout		10,756	19.8	–32.94	
Registered voters		54,363			
Liberal hold		Swing		+8.78	
Source: Elections BC

2020 British Columbia general election
Party	Candidate	Votes	%	±%	Expenditures
Liberal	Stephanie Cadieux	12,970	47.36	−3.58	$39,053.31
New Democratic	Pauline Greaves	11,794	43.06	+10.19	$7,816.81
Green	Tim Ibbotson	2,623	9.58	−2.27	$1,370.48
Total valid votes		27,387	98.64	–	
Total rejected ballots		377	1.36	+0.57	
Turnout		27,764	52.74	−7.17	
Registered voters		52,640			
Source: Elections BC
Liberal hold		Swing		-6.89	

2017 British Columbia general election
Party	Candidate	Votes	%	Expenditures
Liberal	Stephanie Cadieux	13,509	50.94	$46,393
New Democratic	Jonathan Silveira	8,718	32.87	$14,789
Green	Pascal Tremblay	3,141	11.84	$0
Independent	Peter Njenga	634	2.39	$7,288
Libertarian	Josh Barrett	311	1.17	$0
Independent	Gary Hee	140	0.53	$1,202
Your Political Party	Fabiola Cecilia Palomino	67	0.25	$387
Total valid votes		26,520	99.21	
Total rejected ballots		210	0.79	
Turnout		26,730	59.91	
Registered voters		44,615		
Source: Elections BC

== See also ==
- List of British Columbia provincial electoral districts
- Canadian provincial electoral districts
