= CentreBC =

Provincial political party in Canada

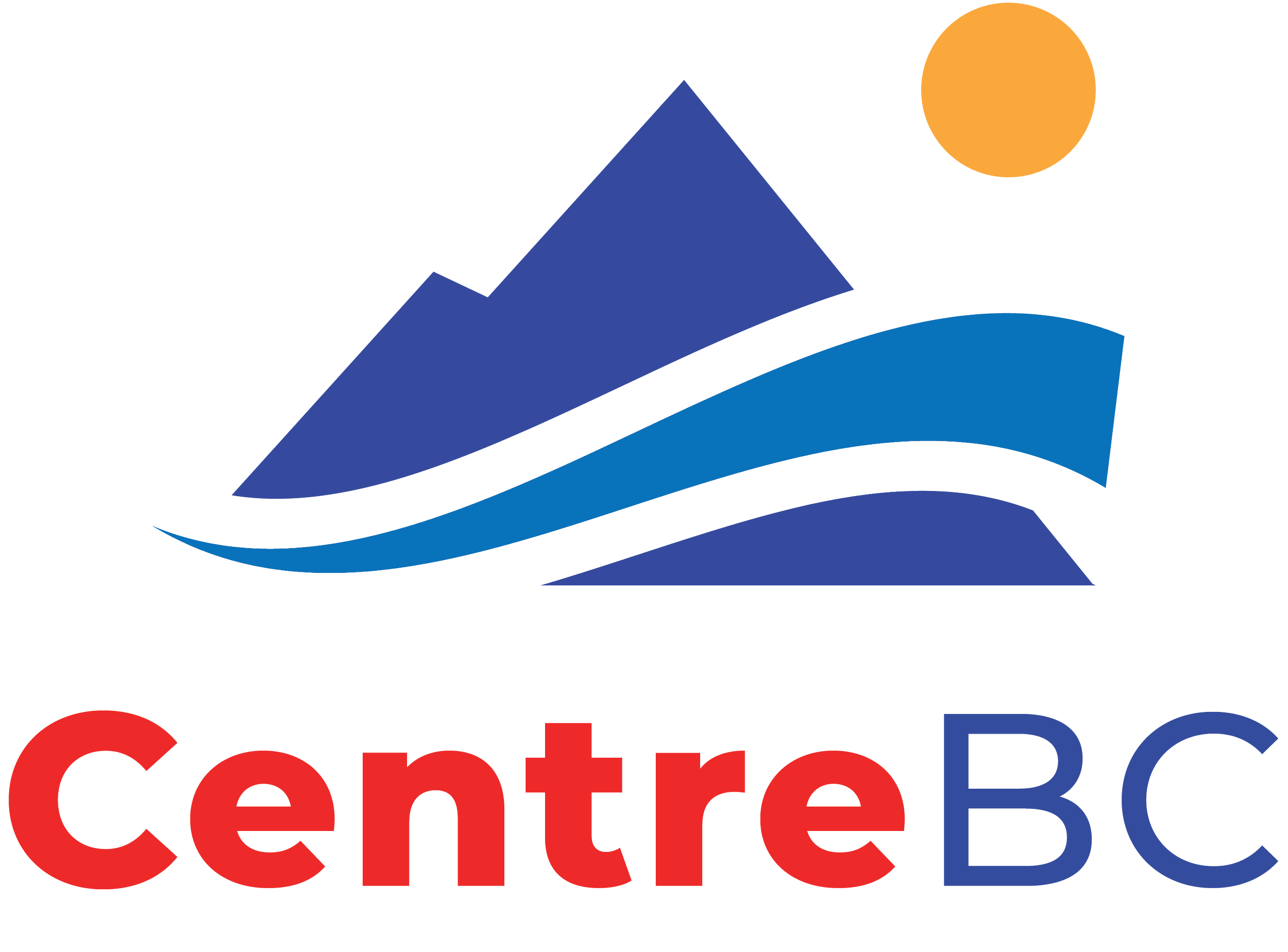
- Leader: Mike Bernier
- President: Mike Wignall
- Founder: Karin Kirkpatrick
- Founded: March 28, 2025; 19 months ago
- Split from: BC United
- Headquarters: P.O. Box 19178, RPO Fourth Ave. Vancouver, BC V6K 4R8
- Ideology: Fiscal conservatism (partially); Big tent
- Political position: Centre to centre-right
- Colours: Red
- Slogan: "Balanced Government for British Columbia"
- Legislative Assembly: 0 / 93

Website
- www.centrebc.ca

CentreBC (Note: Registered with Elections BC as Centre BC) is a centrist, provincial political party in British Columbia, Canada. It was founded by Karin Kirkpatrick, a former MLA with the BC United party (previously the British Columbia Liberal Party). CentreBC was created in 2025 after BC United leader Kevin Falcon withdrew BC United from the 2024 British Columbia general election, and endorsed the BC Conservatives.

Peter Milobar, MLA for Kamloops Centre, was briefly CentreBC leader in September 2026, before rejoining the BC Conservatives after a snap election was called for October 24, 2026.

== History ==
Two years before the foundation of CentreBC, the British Columbia Liberal Party changed its name to BC United as the BC Liberals had not been affiliated with the Liberal Party of Canada since 1987 and, according to campaign strategist Allie Blades, 'the B.C. Liberal name confused and turned off voters who did not support the federal Liberals.' In the run-up to the 2024 British Columbia general election, many BC United supporters switched to the Conservative Party of British Columbia, and on August 28, 2024, BC United leader Kevin Falcon announced the withdrawal of BC United from the election and his endorsement of the BC Conservatives. This decision was opposed by many BC United MLAs, including Karin Kirkpatrick of West Vancouver-Capilano, who chose to run, unsuccessfully, as an Independent in the election along with a number of other former BC United candidates.

In February 2025, Kirkpatrick called on Falcon to resign as BC United leader; Falcon refused to do so, saying that the funds needed to hold a leadership election would further sink the now-indebted party into financial ruin. Kirkpatrick founded CentreBC as a new political party on March 28, 2025, to serve as an option for moderate British Columbian voters who would otherwise have to choose between the BC Conservative Party and the left-leaning New Democratic Party.

Kirkpatrick stepped down as party leader on June 20, 2026. Mike Bernier, former BC United MLA for Peace River South and former mayor of Dawson Creek, was named the new leader of the party on July 18, 2026.

Mike Bernier resigned the leadership on September 18, allowing Kamloops Centre MLA Peter Milobar to effectively merge his British Columbia Party with CentreBC. Milobar became party leader, and seven other former BC Conservative MLAs (Note: Ian Paton, Bruce Banman, Áʼa:líya Warbus, Rosalyn Bird, Teresa Wat, Elenore Sturko, and Donegal Wilson.) joined the party.

The leader of the BC Conservative Party, Kerry-Lynne Findlay, resigned on September 20, and Milobar began discussions with the new BC Conservative interim leader. When a snap election was called on September 22, Milobar resigned as CentreBC leader and returned to the BC Conservatives along with six MLAs that had recently left the party for CentreBC. Elenore Sturko decided to remain, and became the new CentreBC leader.

Former BC Green Party leader Andrew Weaver joined CentreBC as its candidate in Oak Bay-Gordon Head for the 2026 election. Sturko contested Surrey South, which she had represented from 2022 to 2024, rather than seeking re-election in Surrey-Cloverdale. She finished third behind Conservative Megan Knight and New Democrat Parik Tahlan in the October 24 election.

CentreBC failed to win any seats in the election, leaving it without representation in the legislature. On November 13, 2026, Sturko announced she had stepped down as Leader of CentreBC, emphasizing her commitment to public service but that her next chapter involved time away from partisan politics. A replacement leader had not been named as of time of publication. Subsequent to the story, the party put out an announcement on Twitter, announcing Mike Bernier had returned as leader.

== Party leaders ==
#	Name	Term Start	Term End	Notes
—	Karin Kirkpatrick	March 28, 2025	June 20, 2026	Interim leader
1	Mike Bernier	July 18, 2026	September 18, 2026	
2	Peter Milobar	September 18, 2026	September 22, 2026	
3	Elenore Sturko	September 22, 2026	November 13, 2026	
(1)	Mike Bernier	November 14, 2026	Present	Second non-consecutive term as leader.

== Former MLAs ==
- Elenore Sturko, Surrey-Cloverdale
- Bruce Banman, Abbotsford South
- Donegal Wilson, Boundary-Similkameen
- Áʼa:líya Warbus, Chilliwack-Cultus Lake
- Ian Paton, Delta South
- Rosalyn Bird, Prince George-Valemount
- Teresa Wat, Richmond-Bridgeport
- Peter Milobar, Kamloops Centre

== Election results ==
Election	Leader	Candidates run	Seats won	Votes	Vote share	Seat change	Position	Result
2026	Elenore Sturko	35 / 93	0 / 93	29,102	1.60	▼1	No seats	Conservative majority
