= Prince George-Valemount =

Provincial electoral district in British Columbia, Canada

British Columbia electoral district
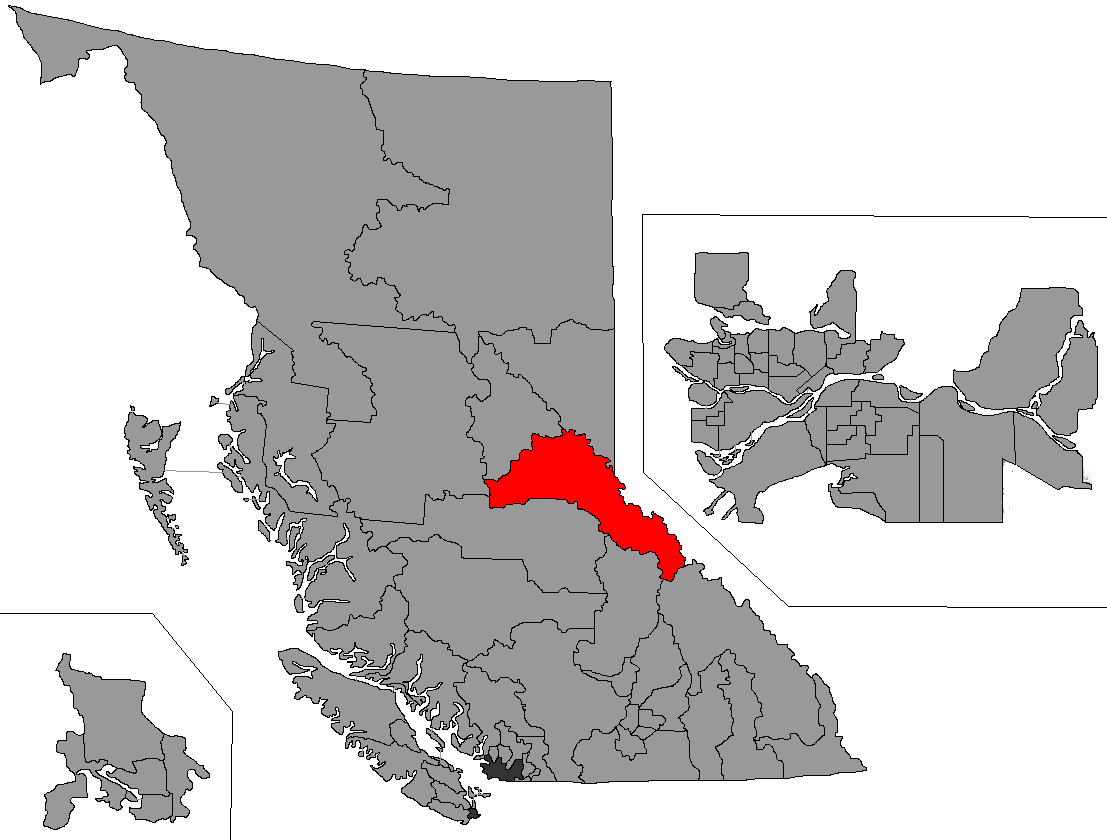

Provincial electoral district
- Legislature: Legislative Assembly of British Columbia
MLA
Rosalyn Bird
Conservative
- District created: 2008
- First contested: 2009
- Last contested: 2026

Demographics
- Population (2006): 46,885
- Area (km²): 31,539.04
- Pop. density (per km²): 1.5
- Census division: Regional District of Fraser-Fort George
- Census subdivision(s): Prince George, Valemount, McBride

Prince George-Valemount is a provincial electoral district in British Columbia, Canada, established by the Electoral Districts Act, 2008 out of most of Prince George-Mount Robson and small parts of Prince George North, Prince George-Omineca, and Cariboo North. It was first contested in the 2009 provincial election.

== Geography ==
As of the 2020 provincial election, Prince George-Valemount comprises the southern portion of the Regional District of Fraser-Fort George, located in east-central British Columbia. The electoral district contains the communities of Valemount, McBride, and the southeastern portion of Prince George. The boundary line within the city of Prince George comes from the east following along the Fraser, and then the Nechako River to the John Hart Bridge where it goes south along Highway 97, west along Massey Drive, south along Ospika Boulevard until Ferry Avenue. The boundary then cuts west to just south of the University of Northern British Columbia before travelling south down Tyner Boulevard, then follows Highway 16 out of the city to the west.

== Members of the Legislative Assembly ==
Its MLA is Rosalyn Bird from the BC Conservative Party since 2024. Before then it was Shirley Bond of BC United. Bond was initially elected to the district of Prince George-Mount Robson.

This riding has elected the following members of the Legislative Assembly:

Prince George-Valemount
Assembly	Years	Member	Party
Riding created from Prince George-Mount Robson
39th	2009–2013	Shirley Bond	Liberal
40th	2013–2017	Shirley Bond	Liberal
41st	2017–2020	Shirley Bond	Liberal
42nd	2020–2023	Shirley Bond	Liberal
42nd	2023–2024	Shirley Bond	BC United
43rd	2024–2026	Rosalyn Bird	Conservative
43rd	2026–2026	Rosalyn Bird	Independent
43rd	2026–2026 (Note: Rejoined the Conservatives after dissolution.)	Rosalyn Bird	CentreBC
44th	2026–present	Rosalyn Bird	Conservative

== Election results ==
Graph of election results in Prince George—Valemount (minor parties that never got 2% of the vote or didn't run consistently are omitted)

2026 British Columbia general election
** Preliminary results — Not yet official **
Party	Candidate	Votes	%	±%	Expenditures
Conservative	Rosalyn Bird	6,597	51.1	-4.1	
New Democratic	Carol Bourque	3,774	29.3	-5.7	
Green	Jodie Capling	1,502	11.6	+1.8	
OneBC	Mitchell Lukoni	1,027	8.0	-	
Total valid votes		12,900			
Total rejected ballots					
Turnout					
Registered voters					
Conservative hold		Swing			
Source: Elections BC

2024 British Columbia general election
Party	Candidate	Votes	%	±%	Expenditures
Conservative	Rosalyn Bird	9,018	55.19	+55.1	$45,251.88
New Democratic	Clay Pountney	5,709	34.94	+5.9	$8,295.36
Green	Gwen Johansson	1,612	9.87	-6.0	$1,311.38
Total valid votes/expense limit		16,339	99.74	–	$71,700.08
Total rejected ballots		43	0.26	–	
Turnout		16,382	53.60	–	
Registered voters		30,564			
Conservative notional gain from BC United		Swing		N/A (Note: Swing cannot be calculated as BC United did not run a candidate in this riding.)	
Source: Elections BC

2020 provincial election redistributed results
Party	%
Liberal	52.1
New Democratic	29.0
Green	15.9
Conservative	0.1

2020 British Columbia general election
Party	Candidate	Votes	%	±%	Expenditures
Liberal	Shirley Bond	9,703	55.62	−2.58	$29,563.67
New Democratic	Laura Parent	4,717	27.04	−2.52	$6,549.23
Green	MacKenzie Kerr	2,597	14.89	+2.65	$5,375.30
Libertarian	Sean Robson	428	2.45	–	$46.95
Total valid votes		17,445	100.00	–	
Total rejected ballots		110	0.63	–0.16	
Turnout		17,555	47.42	–9.33	
Registered voters		37,020			
Liberal hold		Swing		–0.03	
Source: Elections BC

2017 British Columbia general election
Party	Candidate	Votes	%	±%	Expenditures
Liberal	Shirley Bond	11,209	58.20	+1.25	$47,005
New Democratic	Natalie Fletcher	5,694	29.56	−6.33	$36,872
Green	Nan Kendy	2,356	12.24	–	$2,925
Total valid votes		19,259	100.00	–	
Total rejected ballots		154	0.79	−0.28	
Turnout		19,413	56.75	+0.19	
Source: Elections BC

2013 British Columbia general election
Party	Candidate	Votes	%	±%	Expenditures
Liberal	Shirley Bond	11,291	56.95	+6.34	$168,786
New Democratic	Sherry Ogasawara	7,116	35.89	−1.69	$103,073
Conservative	Nathan Giede	1,105	5.57	+1.26	$7,665
Christian Heritage	Donald A. Roberts	314	1.58	-	$1,705
Total valid votes		19,826	100.00		
Total rejected ballots		214	1.07		
Turnout		20,040	56.56		
Source: Elections BC

BC General Election 2009 Prince George-Valemount
Party	Candidate	Votes	%	±	Expenditures
Liberal	Shirley Bond	9,072	50.61	–	$128,833
NDP	Julie Carew	6,737	37.58		$82,706
Green	Andrej De Wolfe	1,225	6.83	–	$1,375
Conservative	Gordon Dickie	780	4.35		$5,426
Refederation	Don Roberts	113	0.63	–	$510
Total Valid Votes		17,927	100%		
Total Rejected Ballots		114	0.6%		
Turnout		18,041	52%		

== See also ==
- List of British Columbia provincial electoral districts
- Canadian provincial electoral districts
