= Trevor Halford =

Canadian politician

The Honorable Trevor Halford MLA
- Halford in 2026

Government House Leader of British Columbia
- Incumbent
- Assumed office November 20, 2026
- Premier: Lorne Doerkson
- Preceded by: Mike Farnworth

Minister of Transportation and Infrastructure of British Columbia
- Incumbent
- Assumed office November 20, 2026
- Premier: Lorne Doerkson
- Preceded by: Mike Farnworth (Transportation); Bowinn Ma (Infrastructure)

Leader of the Opposition of British Columbia
- In office December 4, 2025 – June 29, 2026
- Preceded by: John Rustad
- Succeeded by: Heather Maahs

Leader of the Conservative Party of British Columbia
- Interim; December 4, 2025 – May 30, 2026
- Preceded by: John Rustad
- Succeeded by: Kerry-Lynne Findlay

Member of the British Columbia Legislative Assembly for Surrey-White Rock
- Incumbent
- Assumed office October 24, 2020
- Preceded by: Tracy Redies

Personal details
- Born: Surrey, British Columbia, Canada
- Party: BC Conservative (2024–2026, 2026–present)
- Other political affiliations: Surrey First (2018); BC United (2020–2024); Independent (2026)
- Spouse: Holly Halford
- Children: 3
- Education: Trinity Western University

Trevor Halford MLA is a Canadian politician who served as the interim leader of the Conservative Party of British Columbia and leader of the Opposition from 2025 to 2026. Elected as a member of the Conservative Party, he has served as a member of the Legislative Assembly (MLA) for the electoral district of Surrey-White Rock since 2020. Halford was first elected as a member of the BC Liberal Party (later renamed BC United).

His position as interim party leader was initially disputed by John Rustad, the ousted leader, and his supporters on December 3, 2025, though Rustad resigned the following day. Halford was removed from the Conservative caucus on September 18, 2026, after calling on Rustad's successor, Kerry-Lynne Findlay, to resign.

== Early life and career ==
Born and raised in Surrey, British Columbia, Halford attended Elgin Park Secondary School in South Surrey before graduating from Trinity Western University with a degree in political science. He and his wife Holly have three children together.

== Political career ==
He volunteered for BC Liberal Surrey-White Rock MLA Gordie Hogg in the late 1990s before getting a job in the Legislative Assembly of British Columbia, becoming chief of staff for two cabinet ministers. He was involved in Kevin Falcon's 2011 bid for the Liberal leadership, then worked in the office on communications and issue management for Premier Christy Clark. After leaving government, he became director of public affairs for TransCanada Pipelines. He ran for Surrey City Council in the 2018 municipal election as part of Surrey First, but was not elected.

Halford secured the Liberal nomination for Surrey-White Rock in September 2020; he defeated New Democrat Bryn Smith by 224 votes in that October's provincial election to become the riding's MLA, and was named the official opposition critic for mental health and addictions that November. He became the shadow minister for Transportation and Infrastructure, ICBC and Affordability in December 2022, and later added TransLink, BC Transit and Sport to his portfolio.

He was originally slated to run in the 2024 provincial election as a candidate for BC United (the BC Liberals changed their name in 2023); after BC United pulled out of the election, Halford was announced as the BC Conservative candidate for Surrey-White Rock on September 3, 2024. He replaced Bryan Tepper, who instead ran for the Conservatives in Surrey-Panorama. Halford was re-elected in Surrey-White Rock, and was named official opposition critic for environment and parks by Conservative leader John Rustad that November. On September 18, 2026, Halford, Claire Rattée, and John Rustad were removed from the Conservative caucus by Kerry-Lynne Findlay after the three called on Findlay to resign as leader. Following Findlay's resignation, Halford rejoined the BC Conservative caucus and stood for re-election in Surrey-White Rock.

== Electoral history ==
2026 British Columbia general election: Surrey-White Rock
Party	Candidate	Votes	%	±%	Expenditures
Conservative	Trevor Halford	15,402	57.83		
New Democratic	Darryl Walker	7,744	29.08		
Green	Christine Kinnie	2,055	7.72	—	
OneBC	Amanda James	635	2.38	—	
CentreBC	Waqas Rana	556	2.09	—	
Independent	Kevin Diakiw	196	0.74	—	
Total valid votes		26,588	99.83		
Total rejected ballots		44	0.17		
Turnout		26,632			
Registered voters					
Conservative hold		Swing		+11.10	
Source: Elections BC

2024 British Columbia general election: Surrey-White Rock
Party	Candidate	Votes	%	±%	Expenditures
Conservative	Trevor Halford	14,667	52.3%	–	
New Democratic	Darryl Walker	12,699	45.3%	+6.61	
Libertarian	Damyn Tassie	671	2.4%	+0.77	
Total valid votes		28,037	–		
Total rejected ballots					
Turnout					
Registered voters					
Conservative gain from BC United		Swing		–	
Source: Elections BC
Note:Trevor Halford was elected as a Liberal (BC United) in 2020, but crossed the floor to the Conservatives on September 3, 2024.

2020 British Columbia general election: Surrey-White Rock
Party	Candidate	Votes	%	±%	Expenditures
Liberal	Trevor Halford	10,718	39.51	−10.36	$57,028.20
New Democratic	Bryn Smith	10,494	38.69	+8.10	$9,021.54
Green	Beverly Hobby	3,862	14.24	−1.94	$1,442.61
Independent	Megan Knight	1,607	5.92	–	$17,304.20
Libertarian	Jason Bax	443	1.63	–	$0.00
Total valid votes		27,124	100.00	–	
Total rejected ballots		266	0.97	+0.54	
Turnout		27,390	61.23	−5.90	
Registered voters		44,733			
Liberal hold		Swing		−9.23	
Source: Elections BC
