= Surrey-Cloverdale =

Provincial electoral district in British Columbia, Canada

British Columbia electoral district
- Interactive map of riding boundaries

Provincial electoral district
- Legislature: Legislative Assembly of British Columbia
MLA
Nicholas Cartmell
Conservative
- First contested: 1991
- Last contested: 2026

Demographics
- Population (2021): 56,731
- Area (km²): 30
- Pop. density (per km²): 1,891
- Census division: Metro Vancouver
- Census subdivision: Surrey (part)

Surrey-Cloverdale is a provincial electoral district in British Columbia that has been represented in the Legislative Assembly of British Columbia since 1991.

Created under the 1991 British Columbia electoral redistribution, the district was first contested in the 1991 general election. It was created out of parts of Surrey-Guildford-Whalley, Surrey-Newton and Surrey-White Rock-Cloverdale.

== Demographics ==
Population, 2021	56,731
Area (km^{2})	30
Pop. density (people per km^{2})	1,891
Source: BC Electoral Boundaries Commission

== Geography ==
The district encompasses the southeastern portion of the City of Surrey, including the neighbourhood of Clayton and town centre of Cloverdale. It is bounded by Highway 15 to the west, the Township of Langley to the east, 88th Avenue to the north, and Colebrook Road and the Southern Railway to the south.

== Electoral redistributions ==
Changes to Surrey-Cloverdale in the 1999 electoral redistribution include:

- removal of northwesternmost half to Surrey-Tynehead
- inclusion of a western panhandle from Surrey-Newton

Further changes were made in the 2021 British Columbia electoral redistribution.

== Members of the Legislative Assembly ==
This district has had the following members of the Legislative Assembly elected to it:

Assembly	Years	Member	Party
Surrey-Cloverdale; Riding created from Surrey-Guildford-Whalley, Surrey-Newton and Surrey-White Rock-Cloverdale
35th	1991–1996	Ken Jones	Liberal
36th	1996–2001	Bonnie McKinnon	Liberal
36th	2001–2001	Bonnie McKinnon	Independent
37th	2001–2005	Kevin Falcon	Liberal
38th	2005–2009	Kevin Falcon	Liberal
39th	2009–2013	Kevin Falcon	Liberal
40th	2013–2017	Stephanie Cadieux	Liberal
41st	2017–2020	Marvin Hunt	Liberal
42nd	2020–2024	Mike Starchuk	New Democratic
43rd	2024–2025	Elenore Sturko	Conservative
43rd	2025–2026	Elenore Sturko	Independent
43rd	2026–2026	Elenore Sturko	CentreBC
44th	2026–present	Nicholas Cartmell	Conservative

== Election results ==
2026 British Columbia general election
Party	Candidate	Votes	%	±%	Expenditures
Conservative	Nicholas Cartmell	9,151	52.5	+4.2	
New Democratic	Stephen Dooley	5,846	33.5	-12.0	
Green	Pat McCutcheon	1,314	7.5	+2.1	
CentreBC	Sargy Chima	586	3.4	–	
OneBC	Travis Marchenski	543	3.1	–	
Total valid votes		17,440			
Total rejected ballots					
Turnout					
Registered voters					
Conservative hold		Swing			
Source: Elections BC

2024 British Columbia general election
Party	Candidate	Votes	%	±%	Expenditures
Conservative	Elenore Sturko	10,268	48.3%	+44.82	
New Democratic	Mike Starchuk	9,681	45.6%	–6.5	
Green	Pat McCutcheon	1,150	5.4%	–3.3	
Freedom	Judy Meilleur	153	0.7%		
Total valid votes		21,252	–		
Total rejected ballots					
Turnout					
Registered voters					
Conservative gain from New Democratic		Swing		+44.82	
Source: Elections BC

2020 British Columbia general election
Party	Candidate	Votes	%	±%	Expenditures
New Democratic	Mike Starchuk	12,992	52.10	+13.54	$56,040.91
Liberal	Marvin Hunt	8,758	35.12	−12.86	$38,284.81
Green	Rebecca Smith	2,169	8.70	−3.63	$2,758.94
Conservative	Aisha Bali	867	3.48	–	$0.00
Independent	Marcella Williams	149	0.60	–	$1,431.11
Total valid votes		24,935	100.00	–	
Total rejected ballots		206	0.82	+0.09	
Turnout		25,141	55.16	−6.65	
Registered voters		45,575			
New Democratic gain from Liberal		Swing		+13.20	
Source: Elections BC

2017 British Columbia general election
Party	Candidate	Votes	%	±%	Expenditures
Liberal	Marvin Hunt	11,948	47.67	−11.86	$38,784
New Democratic	Rebecca Smith	9,738	38.86	+9.91	$6,028
Green	Aleksandra Muniak	3,100	12.37	–	$1,141
Libertarian	Peter Poelstra	276	1.10	–	$0
Total valid votes		25,062	100.00	–	
Total rejected ballots		184	0.73	+0.07	
Turnout		25,246	61.84	+4.05	
Registered voters		40,828			
Source: Elections BC

2013 British Columbia general election
Party	Candidate	Votes	%	±%	Expenditures
Liberal	Stephanie Cadieux	18,051	59.53	-3.17	$86,812
New Democratic	Harry Kooner	8,777	28.95	-0.86	$54,929
Conservative	Howard Wu	2,545	8.39		$852
No Affiliation	Matt William Begley	949	3.13		$750
Total valid votes		30,322	99.34		
Total rejected ballots		202	0.66	+0.10	
Turnout		30,524	57.79	+2.77	
Registered voters		52,817			
Source: Elections BC
Liberal hold		Swing		-1.16	

2009 British Columbia general election
Party	Candidate	Votes	%	±%
Liberal	Kevin Falcon	13,815	62.70	1.06
New Democratic	Deborah Payment	6,567	29.81	+1.14
Green	Kevin Purton	1,651	7.49	−1.06
Total valid votes		22,033	99.44	
Total rejected ballots		125	0.56	-0.01
Turnout		22,158	55.03	-10.47
Registered voters		40,268		
Source: Elections BC
Liberal hold		Swing		-0.04

2005 British Columbia general election
Party	Candidate	Votes	%	±%
Liberal	Kevin Falcon	16,429	61.64	−2.08
New Democratic	Ted Allen	7,640	28.66	+17.84
Green	Pierre Rovtar	2,280	8.55	−1.77
Democratic Reform	Joseph Vollhoffer	305	1.14	–
Total valid votes		26,654	99.43	
Total rejected ballots		153	0.57	+0.19
Turnout		26,807	65.49	-9.96
Registered voters		40,932		
Source: Elections BC
Liberal hold		Swing		-9.96

2001 British Columbia general election
Party	Candidate	Votes	%	±%	Expenditures
Liberal	Kevin Falcon	13,739	63.72	+15.45	$47,532
New Democratic	Steve Oakley	2,333	10.82	-19.00	$11,172
Green	Steve Chitty	2,227	10.33	+9.09	$463
Independent	Bonnie McKinnon	1,669	7.74	n/a	$6,828
Unity	George Hoytema	1,112	5.16	+2.76	$4,774
Marijuana	Jason Elliott	481	2.23	n/a	$394
Total valid votes		21,561	99.62		
Total rejected ballots		82	0.38	-0.34	
Turnout		21,643	75.45	+0.70	
Registered voters		28,684			
Source: Elections BC
Liberal hold		Swing		+17.22	

^ Unity totals compared to FCP

1996 British Columbia general election
Party	Candidate	Votes	%	±%	Expenditures
Liberal	Bonnie McKinnon	14,297	48.27	+9.99	$44,135
New Democratic	Charan Gill	8,831	29.82	-1.03	$45,783
Reform	Stuart Clark	2,690	9.08	n/a	$8,429
Progressive Democrat	Philip McCormack	2,417	8.16	n/a	$839
Family Coalition	Heather Stilwell	709	2.39	+1.29	$3,584
Green	David Walters	366	1.24	n/a	$790
Social Credit	Bill Gall	306	1.03	-28.36	$8,044
Total valid votes		29,616	99.28		
Total rejected ballots		214	0.72	-1.08	
Turnout		29,830	74.75		
Registered voters		39,904			
Source: Elections BC
Liberal hold		Swing		+5.51	

1991 British Columbia general election
Party	Candidate	Votes	%	Expenditures
Liberal	Ken Jones	9,012	38.28	$12,624
New Democratic	Charan Gill	7,261	30.84	$30,517
Social Credit	Judy Higginbotham	6,920	29.40	$64,823
Family Coalition	John P. Onderwater	260	1.10	$1,434
Libertarian	Eric Smith	88	0.37	
Total valid votes		23,541	98.21	
Total rejected ballots		430	1.79	
Turnout		23,971	78.69%	

== See also ==
- List of British Columbia provincial electoral districts
- Canadian provincial electoral districts
