= Ian Paton (politician) =

Canadian politician

The Honourable Ian Paton MLA

Minister of Agriculture of British Columbia
- Incumbent
- Assumed office November 20, 2026
- Premier: Lorne Doerkson
- Preceded by: Lana Popham

Member of the British Columbia Legislative Assembly for Delta South
- Incumbent
- Assumed office May 9, 2017
- Preceded by: Vicki Huntington

Personal details
- Party: BC Conservative (2024–2026, 2026–present)
- Other political affiliations: BC United (until 2024); Independent (2026); CentreBC (2026)
- Education: University of British Columbia
- Profession: Auctioneer, farmer

Ian Paton MLA is a Canadian politician who has served as a member of the Legislative Assembly of British Columbia (MLA) representing the electoral district of Delta South since 2017. Initially elected as a member of the BC Liberal Party (later BC United), he crossed the floor to the Conservative Party in 2024. Re-elected as a Conservative that year, he left that party briefly in September 2026 to sit as an independent before joining CentreBC later that month. Four days later, he rejoined the Conservative Party.

== Early life and career ==
Paton has lived in Delta all his life, now residing on his family farm in Ladner with his wife Pam. He is a third generation farmer and has over 30 years of experience running a dairy farm and a farm auction business. His community involvement includes serving as the past president of the East Delta Community Hall Society and as a volunteer firefighter at Hall 4. He also has contributed to local organizations such as the Delta Hospital Foundation, REACH Child and Youth Development Society, and the Delta Farmland and Wildlife Trust.

== Political career ==
=== Delta City Councillor ===
In 2010, Paton was elected as Delta city councillor where he chaired committees including the Agricultural Advisory Committee and the Dikes and Drainage Committee. He spent seven years as a city councillor.

=== BC Liberals/United ===
Paton was first elected in 2017, after Vicki Huntington, an independent MLA, stepped down after two terms.

After party leader Christy Clark resigned, interim leader Rich Coleman, with his party now forming the Official Opposition, appointed Paton to be co-critic for the Ministry of Agriculture along with former Minister of Agriculture (2012–2017) Norm Letnick. During the ensuing 2018 British Columbia Liberal Party leadership election Paton endorsed Todd Stone, though Andrew Wilkinson won the race. Wilkinson kept Paton as the agriculture critic.

Paton sponsored two private member bills. The Preserving Brunswick Point for Agriculture and Migrating Waterfowl Habitat Act (Bill M-221) was introduced May 27, 2019, and sought to require Crown Land in Delta's Brunswick Point area not be transferred or sold and be used only for farming. The Home-Based Craft Food Act (Bill M-228) was introduced on October 28, 2019, and proposed to create a category of lower risk foods, such as baked goods, candy and fruit pies, that could be produced in a dwelling's kitchen without being first inspected by a local health authority.

Paton was re-elected to the legislature in 2020, winning 52% of the vote.

=== Conservative Party of BC ===
Six days after BC United suspended their election campaign, on September 3, 2024, Ian Paton was officially announced as the candidate for the Conservative Party of British Columbia in Delta South. He went on to win his seat again, defeating NDP candidate Jason McCormick with 55.1% of the vote share. Paton is now serving his third term in the legislature and has been appointed the critic for Agriculture, Fisheries and Agricultural Land Commission.

On August 24, 2026, it was announced that Paton would be leaving the BC Conservative Caucus. He and MLA Peter Milobar announced their intention to form a new party, with Milobar as leader. Paton also accused the chief of staff of new BC Conservative leader Kerry-Lynne Findlay of offering him a paid job with an MLA's salary if he resigned his seat to allow Findlay to run in the ensuing by-election.

In September 2026, fellow Conservative defectors Bruce Banman, Áʼa꞉líya Warbus, and Rosalyn Bird announced they would join Paton and Milobar in forming a new party.

=== CentreBC ===
On September 18, Milobar became leader of CentreBC, and Paton, along with six other MLAs, joined him in the party.

== Electoral history ==
2026 British Columbia general election: Delta South
Party	Candidate	Votes	%	±%	Expenditures
Conservative	Ian Paton	15,338	59.69	+4.62	
New Democratic	Jason McCormick	7,357	28.63	−16.3	
Green	Skadi Green	2,127	8.28	—	
OneBC	Jim McMurtry	838	3.26	—	
Total valid votes		25,660	99.86		
Total rejected ballots		37	0.14		
Turnout		25,697			
Registered voters					
Conservative hold		Swing		+10.53	
Source: Elections BC

2024 British Columbia general election: Delta South
Party	Candidate	Votes	%	±%	Expenditures
Conservative	Ian Paton	14,491	55.07	–	$42,172.84
New Democratic	Jason McCormick	11,822	44.93	+10.4	$4,990.71
Total valid votes/expense limit		26,313	99.62	–	$71,700.08
Total rejected ballots		101	0.38	–	
Turnout		26,414	65.04	–	
Registered voters		40,611			
Conservative notional gain from BC United		Swing		N/A (Note: Swing cannot be calculated as BC United did not run a candidate in this riding.)	
Source: Elections BC

2020 British Columbia general election: Delta South
Party	Candidate	Votes	%	±%	Expenditures
Liberal	Ian Paton	12,828	51.70	+7.6	$41,976.94
New Democratic	Bruce Reid	8,404	33.87	+13.15	$4,625.74
Green	Peter van der Velden	3,581	14.43	+5.12	$0.00
Total valid votes		24,813	100.00	–	
Total rejected ballots					
Turnout					
Registered voters					
Source: Elections BC

2017 British Columbia general election: Delta South
Party	Candidate	Votes	%	±%	Expenditures
Liberal	Ian Paton	11,123	44.10	+7.45	$52,639
Independent	Nicholas Wong	6,437	25.52	–	$14,182
New Democratic	Bruce Reid	5,228	20.72	+5.17	$4,570
Green	Larry Colero	2,349	9.31	–	$389
Action	Errol Edmund Sherley	88	0.35	–	$0
Total valid votes		25,225	100.00	–	
Total rejected ballots		68	0.27	−0.14	
Turnout		25,293	71.79	+3.50	
Registered voters		35,234			
Source: Elections BC
