= Langley-Walnut Grove =

Provincial electoral district in British Columbia, Canada

British Columbia electoral district
- Interactive map of riding boundaries

Provincial electoral district
- Legislature: Legislative Assembly of British Columbia
MLA
Misty Van Popta
Conservative
- District created: 2023
- First contested: 2024
- Last contested: 2026

Demographics
- Population (2021): 54,818
- Area (km²): 67
- Pop. density (per km²): 818.2
- Census division: Metro Vancouver
- Census subdivision(s): Langley (part), Katzie 2, McMillan Island 6

Langley-Walnut Grove is a provincial electoral district for the Legislative Assembly of British Columbia.

The riding was created under the 2021 British Columbia electoral redistribution and was first contested in the 2024 general election. It was formed from portions of Langley East.

== Demographics ==
| Population, 2021 | 54,818 |
| Area (km^{2}) | 67 |
| Pop. Density (people per km^{2}) | 818 |
Source: BC Electoral Boundaries Commission

== Geography ==
Located in the Township of Langley, the district comprises the communities of Willoughby, Walnut Grove, Fort Langley and Forest Knolls. It is bordered by the Fraser River to the north and the municipal boundary with Surrey to the west.

The district also encompasses McMillan Island, including the Katzie 2 and McMillan Island 6 reserves.

== Members of the Legislative Assembly ==
This riding has elected the following members of the Legislative Assembly:

| Assembly | Years | Member | Party |
|---|---|---|---|
Langley-Walnut Grove; Riding created from Langley East
| 43rd | 2024–2026 | Misty Van Popta | Conservative |
| 44th | 2026–present | Misty Van Popta | Conservative |

== Election results ==
2026 British Columbia general election
The 2026 general election will be held on October 24.
| Party | Candidate | Votes | % | ±% | Expenditures |
|---|---|---|---|---|---|
| New Democratic | Holly Isaac | | | | |
| Green | Sam Meyer | | | | |
| CentreBC | Kyle Stevenson | | | | |
| Conservative | Misty Van Popta | | | | |
| Total valid votes | | | | | |
| Total rejected ballots | | | | | |
| Turnout | | | | | |
| Registered voters | | | | | |
Source: Elections BC

2024 British Columbia general election
| Party | Candidate | Votes | % | ±% | Expenditures |
|---|---|---|---|---|---|
| Conservative | Misty Van Popta | 12,121 | 49.56 | +39.3 | $59,960.42 |
| New Democratic | Megan Dykeman | 10,949 | 44.77 | -1.0 | $62,198.60 |
| Green | Rylee Mac Lean | 1,254 | 5.13 | -6.8 | $0.00 |
| Independent | Carlos Suarez Rubio | 134 | 0.55 | – | $500.00 |
| Total valid votes/expense limit | | 24,458 | 99.89 | – | $71,700.08 |
| Total rejected ballots | | 27 | 0.11 | – | |
| Turnout | | 24,485 | 58.00 | – | |
| Registered voters | | 42,213 | | | |
| Conservative notional gain from New Democratic | | Swing | | +20.1 | |
Source: Elections BC

2020 provincial election redistributed results
| Party | % |
|---|---|
| New Democratic | 45.8 |
| Liberal | 30.6 |
| Green | 11.9 |
| Conservative | 10.3 |
| Others | 1.4 |

== See also ==
- List of British Columbia provincial electoral districts
- Canadian provincial electoral districts
