= Fort Langley-Aldergrove =

Defunct provincial electoral district in British Columbia, Canada

Coordinates: 49.129°N 122.541°W

British Columbia electoral district

Defunct provincial electoral district
- Legislature: Legislative Assembly of British Columbia
- First contested: 1991
- Last contested: 2013

Demographics
- Population (2001): 52,440
- Area (km²): 234

Fort Langley-Aldergrove was a provincial electoral district for the Legislative Assembly of British Columbia, Canada. It was created for the 1991 election from the dual member Langley riding and abolished in 2017 into Langley East, Abbotsford South, and Abbotsford West.

== Demographics ==
Population, 2001	52,440
Population Change, 1996–2001	8.5%
Area (km^{2})	234
Pop. Density (people per km^{2})	224.10

== Electoral history ==
2013 British Columbia general election
Party	Candidate	Votes	%	±%
Liberal	Rich Coleman	15,989	55.10	–5.99
New Democratic	Shane Dyson	7,511	25.89	–4.34
Conservative	Rick Manuel	2,615	9.01	–
Green	Lisa David	2,229	7.68	+0.56
Independent	Kevin Mitchell	672	2.32	–
Total valid votes		29,016	100.00	
Total rejected ballots		136	0.47	
Turnout		29,152	60.53	
Source: Elections BC

B.C. General Election 2009 Fort Langley-Aldergrove
Party	Candidate	Votes	%	±%
Liberal	Rich Coleman	15,139	61.09	
NDP	Gail Chaddock-Costello	7,492	30.23	
Green	Travis Erbacher	1,765	7.12	–
Refederation	Jordan Braun	387	1.56	–
Total		24,783	100.00%	

B.C. General Election 2005 Fort Langley-Aldergrove
Party	Candidate	Votes	%	±%
Liberal	Rich Coleman	15,454	59.13%	
NDP	Shane Dyson	7,597	29.07%	
Green	Andrea Meagan Welling	2,529	9.68%	–
Marijuana	Marc Emery	374	1.43%	
Platinum	Stephen Christopher Davis	183	0.70%	–
Total		26,137	100.00%	

B.C. General Election 2001: Fort Langley-Aldergrove
Party	Candidate	Votes	%	±	Expenditures
Liberal	Rich Coleman	16,527	68.30%	–	$39,126
Green	Andrea Welling	2,766	11.43%	–	$1,207
NDP	Simon Challenger	2,619	10.82%		$11,421
Unity	Deanna Jopling	1,275	5.27%	–	$5,989
Marijuana	Joshua McKenzie	674	2.79%		$544
Independent	Murray Dunbar	336	1.39%		$977
Total valid votes		24,197	100.00%		
Total rejected ballots		111	0.46%		
Turnout		24,308	73.47%		

B.C. General Election 1996: Fort Langley-Aldergrove
Party	Candidate	Votes	%	±	Expenditures
Liberal	Rich Coleman	12,005	47.30%	–	$47,631
NDP	Charles Bradford	7,369	29.03%		$15,814
Reform	John Twidale	3,484	13.73%	–	$13,691
Progressive Democrat	Bob Farquhar	1,737	6.84%	–	
Green	Amy Salmon	472	1.86%	–	$774
Family Coalition	Lila O. Stanford	316	1.24%	–	$2,878
Total valid votes		25,383	100.00%		
Total rejected ballots		124	0.49%		
Turnout		25,507	76.09%		

1991 British Columbia general election
Party	Candidate	Votes	%	Expenditures
Liberal	Gary Farrell-Collins	8,663	43.57	$8,849
New Democratic	Charles Bradford	6,027	30.31	$24,268
Social Credit	Dan Peterson	4,880	24.54	$40,933
Independent	Lila Stanford	227	1.14	$1,203
Western Canada Concept	William White	87	0.44	–
Total valid votes		19,884	100.00	
Total rejected ballots		243	1.21	
Turnout		20,127	77.44	
Source: Legislative Library of British Columbia

== See also ==
- List of British Columbia provincial electoral districts
- Canadian provincial electoral districts
