= Rich Coleman =

Canadian politician

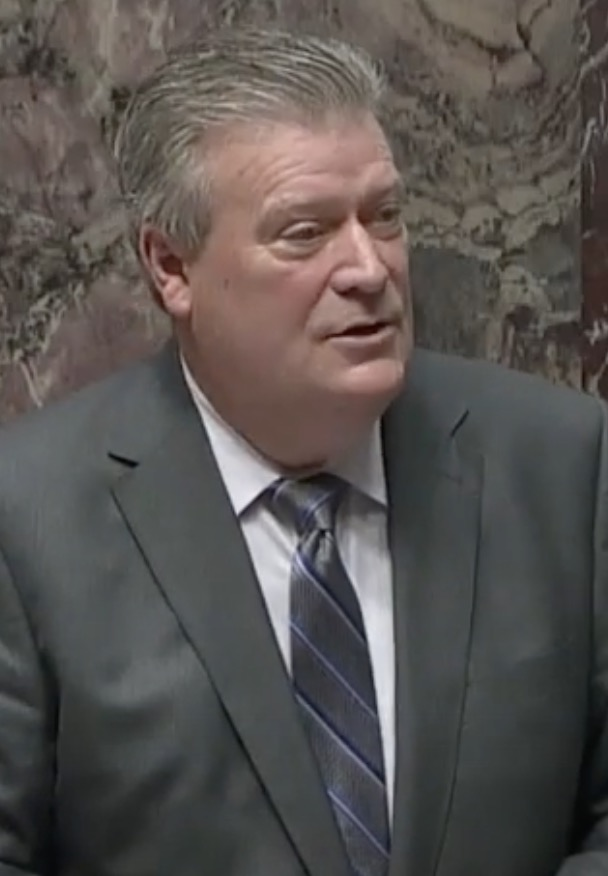

Leader of the Opposition of British Columbia
- In office August 4, 2017 – February 3, 2018
- Preceded by: Christy Clark
- Succeeded by: Andrew Wilkinson

13th Deputy Premier of British Columbia
- In office September 5, 2012 – July 18, 2017
- Premier: Christy Clark
- Preceded by: Kevin Falcon
- Succeeded by: Carole James

Member of the British Columbia Legislative Assembly for Langley East Fort Langley-Aldergrove (1996-2017)
- In office May 28, 1996 – November 24, 2020
- Preceded by: Gary Farrell-Collins
- Succeeded by: Megan Dykeman

Minister of Public Safety and Solicitor General of British Columbia
- In office June 5, 2001 – June 16, 2005
- Premier: Gordon Campbell
- Preceded by: Ivan Messmer
- Succeeded by: John Les
- In office April 27, 2009 – June 10, 2009
- Premier: Gordon Campbell
- Preceded by: John van Dongen
- Succeeded by: Kash Heed
- In office October 25, 2010 – March 14, 2011
- Premier: Gordon Campbell
- Preceded by: Mike de Jong
- Succeeded by: Shirley Bond

Minister of Forests and Range of British Columbia
- In office June 16, 2005 – June 23, 2008
- Premier: Gordon Campbell
- Preceded by: Mike de Jong (Forests)
- Succeeded by: Pat Bell

Minister of Housing and Social Development of British Columbia
- In office June 23, 2008 – October 25, 2010
- Premier: Gordon Campbell
- Succeeded by: Kevin Krueger

Minister of Energy and Mines of British Columbia Minister of Energy, Mines and Natural Gas (2012-2013)
- In office March 14, 2011 – June 10, 2013
- Premier: Christy Clark
- Preceded by: Steve Thomson
- Succeeded by: Bill Bennett
- In office June 12, 2017 – July 18, 2017
- Premier: Christy Clark
- Preceded by: Bill Bennett
- Succeeded by: Michelle Mungall (Energy, Mines and Petroleum Resources)

Minister of Natural Gas Development of British Columbia
- In office June 10, 2013 – June 12, 2017
- Premier: Christy Clark
- Preceded by: position established
- Succeeded by: Ellis Ross

Leader of the BC Liberal Party (interim)
- In office August 4, 2017 – February 3, 2018
- Preceded by: Christy Clark
- Succeeded by: Andrew Wilkinson

Personal details
- Born: Nelson, British Columbia, Canada
- Party: Elevate Langley; BC Liberal
- Spouse: Michele Coleman

Richard Thomas Coleman is a Canadian politician and former police officer who served as a Member of the Legislative Assembly (MLA) in British Columbia, representing Fort Langley-Aldergrove from 1996 to 2017, and Langley East from 2017 to 2020. As part of the British Columbia Liberal Party caucus, he served in several cabinet posts under Premiers Gordon Campbell and Christy Clark, including as the 13th Deputy Premier of British Columbia from 2012 to 2017. He was also the party's interim leader and Leader of Opposition in British Columbia between 2017 and 2018.

== Early life ==
Coleman was born in Nelson as the third of six siblings. His father was a civil servant and his mother Rosa Coleman was a school English teacher. He moved to Penticton with his family in 1957, and graduated from Penticton Secondary School in 1971. He is married to Michele Coleman, with whom he has two children.

Before entering politics, Coleman was a member of the Royal Canadian Mounted Police (RCMP) and ran a real estate management business.

== Political career ==
As a candidate with the British Columbia Liberal Party, Coleman was first elected to the Legislative Assembly of British Columbia in 1996 to represent Fort Langley-Aldergrove, and was re-elected in that riding in 2001, 2005, 2009 and 2013. During his first term from 1996 to 2001, Coleman served as opposition housing critic, forests deputy critic and caucus whip, and was a member of the Official Opposition Caucus Committee on Crime. With the Liberals gaining power in 2001, he was named to the cabinet by Premier Gordon Campbell as Minister of Public Safety and Solicitor General.

After winning re-election in 2005, he was re-assigned Minister of Forests and Range, and Minister Responsible for Housing. He approved in January 2007 the removal of 28,283 hectares (approx. 70,000 acres) of private land from three coastal tree farm licences along the southwest coast of Vancouver Island, and transferred ownership of these lands in totality to Western Forest Products. Minister Coleman announced this decision about eight months after his brother, Stan Coleman, joined Western Forest Products as their manager of strategic planning.

In response to the many concerns and allegations of this land giveaway, the University of Victoria's Environmental Law Centre requested an official investigation by the Auditor-General's Office of British Columbia. On July 1, 2008, BC Auditor-General John Doyle released his report, "Removing Private Land from Tree Farm Licences 6, 19 & 25: Protecting the Public Interest?" In his report he "condemned former forests minister Rich Coleman for allowing a forestry company to remove land from three tree farm licences for residential development, citing the possibilities of conflicts of interest and insider trading by government staff."

As Minister of Housing and Social Development from 2008 to 2010, Rich Coleman presided over those years when offshore foreign investment in BC real estate was a growing public concern, amidst a growing housing crisis. As late as July 2015, he refused to comply with repeated requests for relevant data and analysis: “We’ve worked with the real estate guys for years and have got data on sales,” Coleman said. Asked twice why not at least share the data, he redirected the topic to dangers of restricting foreign investment, claiming that “throws an ethnic group out there and says they’re the problem.” By August 2016, with a year leading up to the next provincial election (May 2017), "the B.C. government moved so quickly to institute its new tax on foreign buyers that it never finished a promised study into the impact of foreign ownership on housing affordability."

Coleman briefly resumed the role of Minister of Public Safety and Solicitor General in April 2009 following the resignation of John van Dongen, until Kash Heed took over the post that June. During that time, Coleman was the minister responsible for the April 2009 shutdown of an RCMP task force on illegal gambling, three months after it warned that organized crime was involved in both legal and illegal gaming activities in BC. Internal government records were later released suggesting that the task force was disbanded due to "funding pressure ... and perceived ineffectiveness." Coleman has said that the team was shut down because "it wasn't effective." In early 2020 new revelations came to light regarding the extent and criminality of this episode of money laundering in BC. Rich Coleman "was repeatedly asked to respond in an interview to the allegations in this story" but refused, agreeing by statement only to cooperate with any future inquiry. Coleman once more returned as Solicitor General in October 2010 following a cabinet shuffle.

On December 1, 2010, Coleman announced to the media he had decided not to enter the provincial Liberal leadership race to replace the outgoing Gordon Campbell. Coleman indicated he had planned to announce his run the following day, had MLA support and campaign funds, but decided not to pursue the post due to family reasons. He was considered a frontrunner in the race. He instead supported Kevin Falcon, who placed second in the leadership election behind Christy Clark.

Coleman was named Minister of Energy and Mines and Minister Responsible for Housing in March 2011, as part of Clark's initial cabinet. He became deputy premier in September 2012 following the resignation of Kevin Falcon, and continued in the re-titled post of Minister of Energy, Mines and Natural Gas. Following his re-election in 2013, he was named to the newly established position of Minister of Natural Gas Development, and stayed on as deputy premier.

He was re-elected in the 2017 election in the new riding of Langley East, and returned to the cabinet as deputy premier and Minister of Energy and Mines. He finished his term in both roles that July, following the Liberal minority government's defeat in a confidence vote on June 29. With Christy Clark resigning as leader of the Liberal Party, Coleman stated he did not intend to run for the position, and was named interim party leader and Leader of the Opposition on August 4, 2017. He served in those roles until Andrew Wilkinson was elected new Liberal leader in February 2018, and announced in February 2020 that he would not seek re-election in the next provincial election.

Coleman is considered one of the best fundraisers and organizers for the BC Liberals.

In June 2022 the Cullen Commission of Inquiry into Money Laundering in British Columbia final report stated: "By 2010, then-minister responsible for gaming Rich Coleman was aware of the concerns of the GPEB investigation division and law enforcement that the province's casinos were being used to launder the proceeds of crime... more could have been done by Mr. Coleman... who served in that role for extended periods during the evolution of this crisis.

A poll conducted by Research Co. in June 2022 found that 66% of British Columbians believed it is true that Coleman knowingly ignored warnings about suspected drug money laundering in casinos.

Coleman ran for mayor of Langley Township in 2022 as a candidate with Elevate Langley, finishing a distant third.

== Honours ==
Coleman received the Queen's Golden Jubilee Medal in 2003 and was awarded the Canada 125 Medal for community service. He was the 1988 Langley, British Columbia Volunteer of the Year, and was awarded Rotary's top honour, the Paul Harris Fellowship.

Coleman was the second person ever awarded Kin Canada (Kinsmen)'s highest honour, the Hal Rogers Fellowship, after Kin founder Harold A. Rogers.

== Electoral record ==
2017 British Columbia general election: Langley East
Party	Candidate	Votes	%	Expenditures
Liberal	Rich Coleman	16,348	53.45	$58,649
New Democratic	Inder Johal	7,817	28.14	$7,046
Green	Bill Masse	4,968	16.24	$587
Libertarian	Alex Joehl	448	1.47	$39
Total valid votes		30,584	100.00	
Total rejected ballots		223	0.72	
Turnout		30,807	64.54	
Registered voters		47,730		
Source: Elections BC

2013 British Columbia general election: Fort Langley-Aldergrove
Party	Candidate	Votes	%	±%
Liberal	Rich Coleman	15,989	55.10	–5.99
New Democratic	Shane Dyson	7,511	25.89	–4.34
Conservative	Rick Manuel	2,615	9.01	–
Green	Lisa David	2,229	7.68	+0.56
Independent	Kevin Mitchell	672	2.32	–
Total valid votes		29,016	100.00	
Total rejected ballots		136	0.47	
Turnout		29,152	60.53	
Source: Elections BC

British Columbia provincial government of Christy Clark
Cabinet posts (3)
Predecessor	Office	Successor
Kevin Falcon	Deputy Premier of British Columbia; September 5, 2012–July 18, 2017	Carole James
Ministry Created	Minister of Natural Gas Development; June 7, 2013–June 12, 2017	Ellis Ross
Steve Thomson	Minister of Energy and Mines; March 14, 2011–June 7, 2013	Bill Bennett
