= Megan Dykeman =

Canadian politician

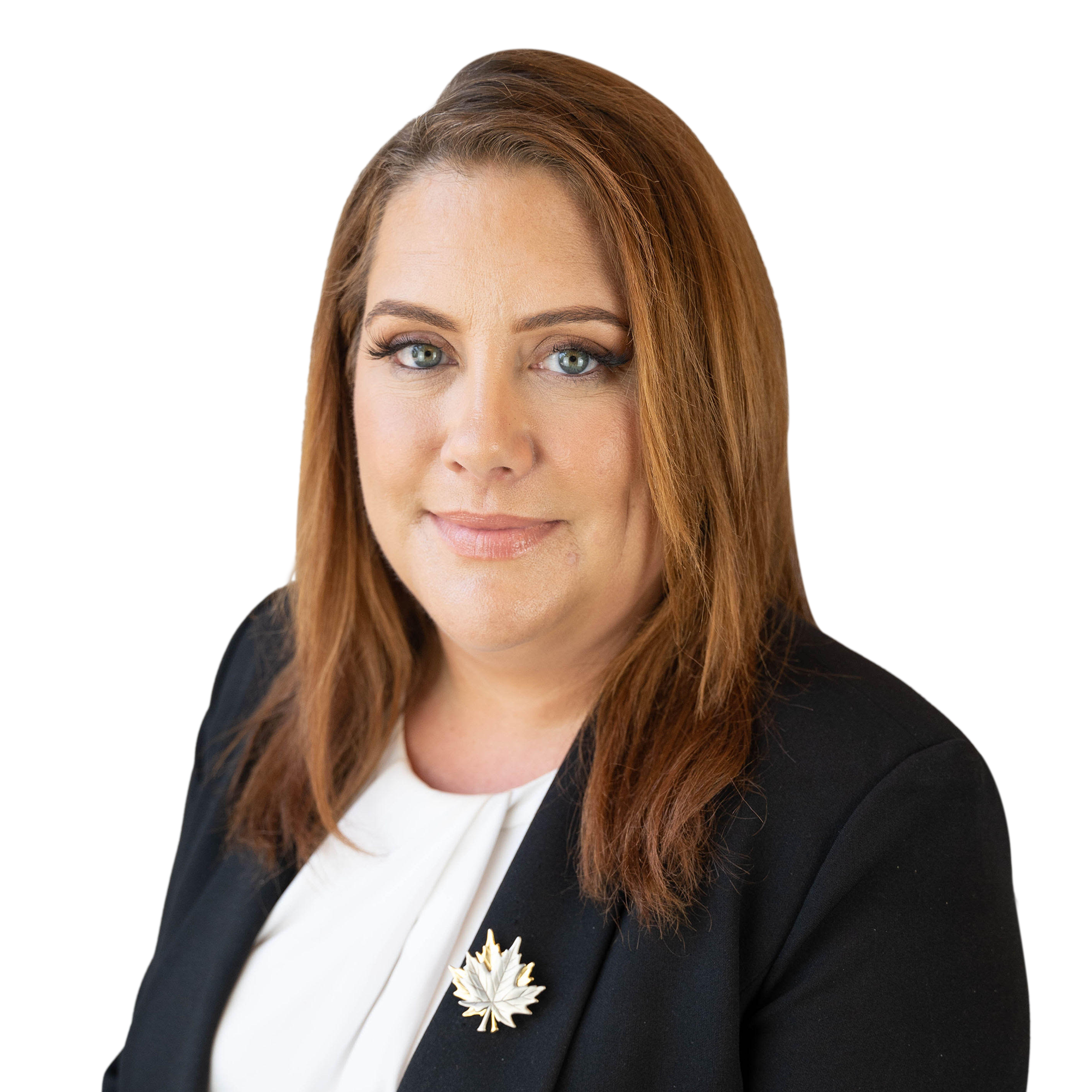

Parliamentary Secretary for Community Development and Non-profits of British Columbia
- In office December 7, 2022 – November 18, 2024
- Premier: David Eby
- Preceded by: Niki Sharma
- Succeeded by: Joan Phillip

Member of the British Columbia Legislative Assembly for Langley East
- In office October 24, 2020 – October 19, 2024
- Preceded by: Rich Coleman
- Succeeded by: Riding dissolved

Personal details
- Born: 1977 or 1978 (age 47–48)
- Party: New Democratic
- Education: Macquarie University

Megan Dykeman (born 1977 or 1978) is a Canadian politician who served as a member of the Legislative Assembly of British Columbia, representing the electoral district of Langley East from 2020 to 2024 as part of the British Columbia New Democratic Party (BC NDP) caucus.

== Biography ==
Dykeman graduated from Macquarie University in Sydney, Australia with a master's degree in international relations. She was the managing director of consulting firm Strategics Canada, and owns a specialty poultry farm in Langley Township. After serving three years on the Langley District Parent Advisory Council, she was elected as trustee on the Langley Board of Education in the 2011 municipal election. She served three terms with the Board, including as vice chair from 2014 to 2018, and chair from 2018 to 2020.

She was announced as the BC NDP's candidate for Langley East on September 30, 2020, and won the riding in that October's provincial election. She was named the Parliamentary Secretary for Community Development and Non-profits by Premier David Eby in December 2022. With the Langley East riding dissolved ahead of the 2024 provincial election, she instead ran for re-election in the newly established Langley-Walnut Grove, but lost to Conservative candidate Misty Van Popta.

She lives in the Fern Ridge neighbourhood of Langley Township with her two children.

== Electoral record ==
2024 British Columbia general election: Langley-Walnut Grove
Party	Candidate	Votes	%	±%	Expenditures
Conservative	Misty Van Popta	12,121	49.56	+39.3	$59,960.42
New Democratic	Megan Dykeman	10,949	44.77	-1.0	$62,198.60
Green	Rylee Mac Lean	1,254	5.13	-6.8	$0.00
Independent	Carlos Suarez Rubio	134	0.55	–	$500.00
Total valid votes/expense limit		24,458	99.89	–	$71,700.08
Total rejected ballots		27	0.11	–	
Turnout		24,485	58.00	–	
Registered voters		42,213			
Conservative notional gain from New Democratic		Swing		+20.1	
Source: Elections BC

2020 British Columbia general election: Langley East
Party	Candidate	Votes	%	±%	Expenditures
New Democratic	Megan Dykeman	13,169	42.56	+14.42	$22,513.09
Liberal	Margaret Kunst	10,385	33.56	−19.89	$48,700.86
Green	Cheryl Wiens	3,533	11.42	−4.82	$8,175.10
Conservative	Ryan Warawa	3,428	11.08	–	$6,882.48
Libertarian	Alex Joehl	231	0.75	−0.72	$403.05
Independent	Tara Reeve	195	0.63	–	$940.54
Total valid votes		30,941	100.00	–	
Total rejected ballots					
Turnout					
Registered voters					
Source: Elections BC
