= 2021 British Columbia electoral redistribution =

An electoral redistribution in British Columbia was undertaken by the BC Electoral Boundaries Commission in 2021. On October 21, 2021, the Government of British Columbia appointed Justice Nitya Iyer, Linda Tynan and Chief Electoral Officer Anton Boegman to serve as the 2021 commissioners. Justice Iyer was appointed the chair.

The commission is required to complete redistricting every two election cycles. The final number of provincial electoral districts, and thus seats in the next legislature, will not be known until redistricting has occurred. The commission is required to complete its preliminary report by October 21, 2022, and its final report six months later.

In May 2021, the government introduced legislation that removed a requirement that no reduction in seats could be considered for certain rural regions. Attorney General David Eby said the changes were necessary to ensure the commission was independent and had the flexibility to recommend boundaries that provide effective representation. The legislation also permits the legislature to grow to up to 93 seats.

In February 2022, the commission opened public consultations for the redistribution. Public hearings were scheduled and public submissions were open until May 31, 2022. Following the release of its initial report in October 2022, further consultations occurred. Its final report was released in April 2023.

The districts defined in this redistribution were first contested in the 2024 British Columbia general election.

== Initial report ==
The initial report, published on October 3, 2022, proposed a total of 93 electoral districts, up from 87 districts. Six new ridings were proposed for areas with rapid population growth, with an additional 71 ridings having their boundaries adjusted to accommodate for geographic, demographic, and other concerns.

=== Burnaby–New Westminster–Tri-Cities ===
An additional district, Burnaby Centre, was proposed for the Burnaby–New Westminster–Tri-Cities area.

New Westminster was found to have a population too large for a single riding but too small for two ridings. The initial report split the city into 5 ridings, sharing 2 electoral districts with Burnaby and 1 electoral district with Richmond.

- Burnaby Centre, new riding
- Burnaby East, lost Eastburn
- Burnaby-New Westminster gained portions of New Westminster from New Westminster-Maillardville
- Burnaby North, lost portions north of Highway 1 to Burnaby Centre
- Burnaby South, redrawn to include the SkyTrain corridor in a single riding
- Coquitlam-Burke Mountain, lost Westwood Plateau to Port Moody-Westwood Plateau
- Coquitlam-Mundy Park, previously named Coquitlam-Maillardville, gained the Kwikwetlem First Nation from Port Coquitlam to ensure both Kwiketlem reserves are in the same electoral district, lost Maillardville to New Westminster-Maillardville
- New Westminster-Maillardville, previously named New Westminster, lost portions to Burnaby-New Westminster, gained Maillardville from Coquitlam-Maillardville
- Port Coquitlam, lost the Kwikwetlem First Nation to Coquitlam-Mundy Park to ensure both Kwiketlem reserves are in the same electoral district
- Port Moody-Westwood Plateau, mostly consists of the existing Port Moody-Coquitlam

=== Fraser Valley–Langley–Maple Ridge ===
The Fraser Valley–Langley–Maple Ridge area gained an additional electoral district, Langley-Willoughby.

- Abbotsford-Mission, lost portions of Abbotsford, gained portions of Mission
- Abbotsford South, lost portions west of Bradner Road to Langley-Aldergrove
- Abbotsford West, lost portions west of Bradner Road and north of the Trans-Canada highway to Langley-Aldergrove
- Chilliwack-Cultus Lake, renamed and consists mostly of portions of Chilliwack-Kent south of the Fraser River, lost District of Kent and Harrison Hot Springs to Fraser-Nicola
- Chilliwack North, reorganized from Chilliwack, gained communities north of the Fraser River around Harrison Lake from Chiliwack-Cultus Lake
- Langley-Abbotsford, previously named Langley East, gained Aldergrove, lost portion which became Langley-Walnut Grove
- Langley-Willowbrook, previously named Langley, lost southern portion to Langley-Abbotsford
- Langley-Walnut Grove, new riding created from portion Langley East
- Maple Ridge East, previously named Maple Ridge-Mission, lost portions of Mission to Abbotsford-Mission.
- Maple Ridge-Pitt Meadows, lost Yennadon to Maple Ridge East

=== Interior BC ===
Interior BC gained an additional electoral district, Kelowna-Centre.

- Kelowna Centre, new riding made mostly from Kelowna West
- Kelowna-Lake Country boundary extended northwards
- Kamloops-Mission, portions moved into Kelowna Centre
- West Kelowna-Peachland, previously named Kelowna West, lost downtown Kelowna to Kelowna Centre, redrawn to include portions of the District of Peachland
- Boundary-Similkameen, lost Christina Lake to Kootenay West
- Fraser-Nicola, gained District of Kent and Harrison Hot Springs
- Kamloops Centre, portions transferred to Fraser-Nicola and Kamloops-North Shuswap
- Kamloops-North Shuswap, gained North Shuswap, lost portions of downtown Kamloops to Kamloops Centre
- Penticton-Summerland, lost Peachland to West Kelowna-Peachland
- Salmon Arm-Shuswap, lost North Shuswap Lake and Seymour Arm to Kamloops-North Shuswap
- Vernon-Monashee, lost Beachcomber Bay, East Bella Vista Highlands, and Okanagan Lake to Kelowna-Lake Country

=== Kootenays ===
The commission initially considered reducing the number of ridings in the region from 4 to 3, but ultimately decided against it, citing effective representation.

- Columbia River-Revelstoke, gained Cranbrook's western outskirts
- Kootenay Central, previously named Nelson-Creston, gained Christina Lake, lost Nakusp, New Denver, and Silverton from Kootenay West
- Kootenay East, portions of Cranbrook lost to Columbia River-Revelstoke
- Kootenay West, gained Christina Lake, lost Nakusp, New Denver, and Silverton to Kootenay Central

=== Northern BC ===
The commission initially considered merging the two Peace River ridings, as well as North Coast with Skeena, but ultimately decided not to in consideration of the great size of the ridings. Minor changes were made to the water boundaries of the ridings.

- Bulkley Valley-Stikine, previously named Stikine
- Nechako Lakes, no changes
- North Coast, no major changes
- Peace River North, no major changes
- Peace River South, no changes
- Skeena, no changes

=== North Shore–Sea to Sky–Sunshine Coast ===
No new districts were added to the region. Four of five districts had their boundaries adjusted.

- North Vancouver-Lonsdale, lost North Lonsdale and portions of Lynn Creek to North Vancouver-Seymour
- North Vancouver-Seymour, gained North Lonsdale and portions of Lynn Creek from North Vancouver-Lonsdale
- Powell River-Sunshine Coast, no changes proposed
- West Vancouver-Capilano, boundaries extended
- West Vancouver-Sea to Sky, boundary with West Vancouver-Capilano adjusted

=== Prince George and the Cariboo ===
The two Cariboo ridings were considered for merging, but adjustments to the ridings were ultimately chosen as the solution to bring each riding into the deviation. All four ridings were ultimately redrawn as a result. There was consideration of bringing the Bella Coola valley into Cariboo-North Thompson, but this was ultimately scrapped as the North Coast riding's population was already below deviation.

- Cariboo-North Thompson
- Prince George-Cariboo
- Prince George-Mackenzie
- Prince George-Valemount

=== Richmond–Delta ===
Discussions on whether Queensborough should be transferred to a New Westminster riding gave no concerns regarding representation; only minor changes were proposed to the Richmond–Delta area.

- Delta North, lost portions south of 64th Avenue to Delta South
- Delta South, gained portions south of 64th Avenue from Delta North
- Richmond-Bridgeport, previously named Richmond North Centre, lost Bridgeport and neighbourhoods east of No. 2 Road and south of Westminster Highway
- Richmond Centre, previously named Richmond South Centre, lost areas south of Blundell and west of Gilbert into Richmond-Steveston
- Richmond-Queensborough, lost Bridgeport to Richmond-Bridgeport
- Richmond-Steveston, gained areas south of Blundell and west of Gilbert from Richmond-Centre

=== Surrey ===
Surrey gained an additional electoral district.

- Surrey Central, new electoral district, created from portions of Surrey-Newton, Surrey-Panorama, and Surrey-Cloverdale
- Surrey City Centre, new electoral district, mostly contains portions of Surrey-Whalley
- Surrey East, previously named Surrey-Cloverdale, gained portions of Cloverdale from Surrey South
- Surrey-Fleetwood, adjustments made to the southern and eastern boundaries
- Surrey-Guildford, adjustments made to the southern boundary
- Surrey-Newton, adjusted to include portions of Surrey-Green Timbers and Surrey-Newton
- Surrey North, created from portions of Surrey-Whalley and Surrey-Green Timbers, lost downtown Surrey to Surrey City Centre, gained portions of Newton
- Surrey-Panorama, portions transferred to Surrey South
- Surrey South, gained portions from Surrey Panorama, lost portions of Cloverdale to Surrey-Cloverdale
- Surrey-White Rock, no changes

=== Vancouver ===
Vancouver gained an additional electoral district, Vancouver-South Granville.

Name changes were proposed due to concerns raised about the distinct identities of Vancouver's neighbourhoods, and the commission's boundaries reflect these suggestions. 5 ridings had their names changed as a result.

- Vancouver-Fraserview, lost the Sunset neighbourhood to Vancouver-Langara
- Vancouver-Hastings, no changes
- Vancouver-Kensington, portions transferred to Vancouver-Little Mountain
- Vancouver-Langara, gained Sunset neighbourhood from Vancouver-Fraserview
- Vancouver-Little Mountain, previously named Vancouver-Fairview
- Vancouver-Point Grey, lost portions to Vancouver-South Granville
- Vancouver-Quilchena, lost portions to Vancouver-Point Grey
- Vancouver-South Granville, gained portions from Vancouver-Point Grey
- Vancouver-Strathcona, previously named Vancouver-Mount Pleasant, lost Gastown to Vancouver-Yaletown and southern Mount Pleasant to Vancouver-Little Mountain
- Vancouver-Renfrew, previously named Vancouver-Kingsway, lost portions of southern Kingsway to Vancouver-Kensington
- Vancouver-West End, no changes
- Vancouver-Yaletown, previously named Vancouver-False Creek, lost southern False Creek to Vancouver-Little Mountain and Vancouver-South Granville, gained Gastown from Vancouver-Strathcona

=== Vancouver Island ===
Vancouver Island gained an additional electoral district, Langford-Highlands.

- Esquimalt-Colwood, previously named Esquimalt-Metchosin, lost Metchosin to Juan de Fuca-Malahat, gained Victoria West from Victoria-Beacon Hill
- Juan de Fuca-Malahat, combined rural communities along the Strait of Juan de Fuca
- Langford-Highlands, new riding, consisting of the City of Langford and the District of Highlands
- Oak Bay-Gordon Head, no changes
- Saanich North and the Islands, lost Brentwood Bay to Saanich South
- Saanich South, gained Brentwood Bay from Saanich North and the Islands
- Victoria-Beacon Hill, lost Victoria West to Esquimalt-Colwood
- Victoria-Swan Lake, no changes
- Nanaimo-Gabriola Island, new riding to contain Nanaimo's downtown
- Nanaimo-Ladysmith, new riding
- Nanaimo-Oceanside, previously named Parksville-Qualicum
- Courtenay-Comox, no changes
- Cowichan Valley, gained Chemainus and Cherry Point for population balance
- Mid Island-Pacific Rim, no changes
- North Island, no changes

== Final report ==
=== No changes (13) ===
- Boundary-Similkameen
- Courtenay-Comox
- Nechako Lakes
- North Island
- Oak Bay-Gordon Head
- Peace River North
- Peace River South
- Powell River-Sunshine Coast
- Skeena
- Surrey-White Rock
- Vancouver-Hastings
- Vancouver-West End
- Victoria-Swan Lake

=== Adjusted (38) ===
- Abbotsford-Mission
- Abbotsford South
- Abbotsford West
- Burnaby North
- Cariboo-Chilcotin
- Columbia River-Revelstoke
- Coquitlam-Burke Mountain
- Coquitlam-Maillardville
- Cowichan Valley
- Delta North
- Delta South
- Fraser-Nicola
- Kamloops-North Thompson
- Kelowna-Mission
- Maple Ridge-Pitt Meadows
- Mid Island-Pacific Rim
- North Vancouver-Lonsdale
- North Vancouver-Seymour
- Port Coquitlam
- Prince George-Mackenzie
- Prince George-Valemount
- Richmond-Queensborough
- Richmond-Steveston
- Saanich North and the Islands
- Saanich South
- Surrey-Cloverdale
- Surrey-Fleetwood
- Surrey-Guildford
- Surrey-Newton
- Surrey-Panorama
- Vancouver-Fraserview
- Vancouver-Kensington
- Vancouver-Langara
- Vancouver-Point Grey
- Vancouver-Quilchena
- Victoria-Beacon Hill
- West Vancouver-Capilano
- West Vancouver-Sea to Sky

=== Name change but otherwise unchanged (2) ===
- Bulkley Valley-Stikine (was Stikine)
- North Coast-Haida Gwaii (was North Coast)

=== Renamed with minor adjustments (14) ===
- Burnaby East generally from Burnaby-Lougheed
- Chilliwack North generally from Chilliwack
- Kootenay Central generally from Nelson-Creston
- Kootenay-Monashee generally from Kootenay West
- Kootenay-Rockies generally from Kootenay East
- Maple Ridge East generally from Maple Ridge-Mission
- Penticton-Summerland generally from Penticton
- Port Moody-Burquitlam generally from Port Moody-Coquitlam
- Richmond-Bridgeport generally from Richmond North Centre
- Richmond Centre generally from Richmond South Centre
- Salmon Arm-Shuswap generally from Shuswap
- Vancouver-Renfrew generally from Vancouver-Kingsway
- Vancouver-Strathcona generally from Vancouver-Mount Pleasant
- Vernon-Lumby generally from Vernon-Monashee

=== Replacement following significant change (8) ===
- Cariboo North replaced by Prince George-North Cariboo
- Chilliwack-Kent loses significant areas to adjacent districts, becoming Chilliwack-Cultus Lake
- Kamloops-South Thompson and Kamloops-North Thompson significantly reorganized, resulting in the former's elimination and the creation of Kamloops Centre
- Nanaimo and mid-island: area mostly corresponding to the three existing districts of Nanaimo, Nanaimo-North Cowichan and Parksville-Qualicum reorganized into three replacements:
  - Nanaimo-Lantzville
  - Nanaimo-Gabriola Island
  - Ladysmith-Oceanside
- Northwest Surrey: area mostly corresponding to the two existing districts of Surrey-Green Timbers and Surrey-Whalley reorganized into two replacements:
  - Surrey North
  - Surrey City Centre

=== Net new districts (6) and adjacent districts with significant changes (11) ===
- Burnaby and New Westminster — four new districts created in an area mostly corresponding to the three existing districts of Burnaby-Deer Lake, Burnaby-Edmonds, and New Westminster:
  - Burnaby Centre
  - Burnaby-New Westminster
  - Burnaby South-Metrotown
  - New Westminster-Coquitlam
- Victoria's Western communities — three new districts created in an area mostly corresponding to the two existing districts of Esquimalt-Metchosin and Langford-Juan de Fuca:
  - Esquimalt-Colwood
  - Juan de Fuca-Malahat
  - Langford-Highlands
- Central Okanagan — three new districts created in an area mostly corresponding to the two existing districts of Kelowna-Lake Country and Kelowna West:
  - Kelowna Centre
  - Kelowna-Lake Country-Coldstream
  - West Kelowna-Peachland
- Langley — three new districts created in an area mostly corresponding to the two existing districts of Langley and Langley East:
  - Langley-Abbotsford
  - Langley-Walnut Grove
  - Langley-Willowbrook
- Surrey-Serpentine River
- North-central Vancouver — three new districts created in an area mostly corresponding to the two existing districts of Vancouver-Fairview and Vancouver-False Creek:
  - Vancouver-Little Mountain
  - Vancouver-South Granville
  - Vancouver-Yaletown

== See also ==
- 2015 British Columbia electoral redistribution
- 2024 British Columbia general election
- Elections BC
