= Langley East =

Defunct provincial electoral district in British Columbia, Canada

British Columbia electoral district

Defunct provincial electoral district
- Legislature: Legislative Assembly of British Columbia
- District created: 2015
- District abolished: 2024
- First contested: 2017
- Last contested: 2020

Demographics
- Population (2014): 61,576
- Area (km²): 186

Langley East is a former provincial electoral district for the Legislative Assembly of British Columbia, Canada, in use from 2017 to 2024.

It was created in the 2015 redistribution from parts of Fort Langley-Aldergrove and Langley. It was first contested in the 2017 election.

Under the 2021 British Columbia electoral redistribution that took effect with the 2024 election, the riding was divided between the new districts of Langley-Walnut Grove and Langley-Abbotsford.

== Members of the Legislative Assembly ==
Assembly	Years	Member	Party
Fort Langley-Aldergrove
35th	1991–1996	Gary Farrell-Collins	Liberal
36th	1996–2001	Rich Coleman	Liberal
37th	2001–2005	Rich Coleman	Liberal
38th	2005–2009	Rich Coleman	Liberal
39th	2009–2013	Rich Coleman	Liberal
40th	2013–2017	Rich Coleman	Liberal
Langley East
41st	2017–2020	Rich Coleman	Liberal
42nd	2020–2024	Megan Dykeman	New Democratic

== Election results ==
2020 British Columbia general election
Party	Candidate	Votes	%	±%	Expenditures
New Democratic	Megan Dykeman	13,169	42.56	+14.42	$22,513.09
Liberal	Margaret Kunst	10,385	33.56	−19.89	$48,700.86
Green	Cheryl Wiens	3,533	11.42	−4.82	$8,175.10
Conservative	Ryan Warawa	3,428	11.08	–	$6,882.48
Libertarian	Alex Joehl	231	0.75	−0.72	$403.05
Independent	Tara Reeve	195	0.63	–	$940.54
Total valid votes		30,941	100.00	–	
Total rejected ballots					
Turnout					
Registered voters					
Source: Elections BC

2017 British Columbia general election
Party	Candidate	Votes	%	Expenditures
Liberal	Rich Coleman	16,348	53.45	$58,649
New Democratic	Inder Johal	7,817	28.14	$7,046
Green	Bill Masse	4,968	16.24	$587
Libertarian	Alex Joehl	448	1.47	$39
Total valid votes		30,584	100.00	
Total rejected ballots		223	0.72	
Turnout		30,807	64.54	
Registered voters		47,730		
Source: Elections BC

== See also ==
- List of British Columbia provincial electoral districts
- Canadian provincial electoral districts
