= Misty Van Popta =

Canadian politician

Misty Van Popta MLA

Member of the Legislative Assembly of British Columbia for Langley-Walnut Grove
- Incumbent
- Assumed office October 19, 2024
- Preceded by: Megan Dykeman

Langley District Councillor
- In office November 7, 2022 – May 29, 2025

Parliamentary Secretary for Infrastructure
- Incumbent
- Assumed office November 20, 2026
- Preceded by: Garry Begg

Personal details
- Party: BC Conservative
- Other political affiliations: Contract With Langley (municipal)
- Relations: Tako van Popta

Misty Van Popta MLA is a Canadian politician who has served as a member of the Legislative Assembly of British Columbia (MLA) representing the electoral district of Langley-Walnut Grove since 2024. She is a member of the Conservative Party. Prior to provincial politics, she served as a councillor for the Township of Langley until May 2025, when MLAs concurrently holding municipal office were deemed to have resigned those positions.

== Early life and career ==
Van Popta grew up in the Fern Ridge and Brookswood areas of Langley, where she also raised her two daughters. She was a member of the first graduating class of the Langley Fine Arts School and is a longtime resident of Fort Langley.

Van Popta is a project manager in the construction industry and holds a Diploma in Project Management and a Project Management Professional designation from Simon Fraser University. Her career began in the pharmaceutical industry in the 1990s, followed by 14 years in technology and pharmaceutical software. She has also co-owned a bicycle shop in Fort Langley.

Van Popta has also been involved in several local organizations, including the Township of Langley's Heritage Advisory Committee, the Langley Christian School Society, the Fort Langley Business Association, and the Fort Langley Cranberry Festival.

== Political career ==
Van Popta first ran for a seat on the Township of Langley Council in 2011. In 2022, she was elected as a councillor as part of the Contract With Langley slate, alongside Mayor Eric Woodward. As a councillor, she has served on several regional and local bodies, including Metro Vancouver's Water Committee and Climate Action Committee, the Greater Vancouver Regional District Municipal Directors, the Salvation Army Gateway of Hope Community Council, and the Township's Recreation, Culture and Parks Advisory Committee. Her stated priorities on council have included addressing school overcrowding, increasing investment in health care and transit, and responding to the impact of provincial legislation on the municipality.

In April 2024, Van Popta was nominated as the Conservative Party of British Columbia's candidate for the riding of Langley-Walnut Grove. She was elected to the Legislative Assembly of British Columbia in the 2024 provincial election, and was appointed to the official opposition's shadow cabinet as critic for infrastructure and construction.

Following her election to the legislature, Van Popta continued to serve concurrently as a councillor and an MLA, a decision that led to criticisms from the British Columbia New Democratic Party, which accused her of double-dipping. On May 29, 2025, the Eligibility to Hold Public Office Act, which prohibited MLAs from simultaneously holding any municipal offices and deemed any dual officeholders such as Van Popta to have resigned their municipal offices, came into effect.

== Electoral history ==
2024 British Columbia general election: Langley-Walnut Grove
| Party | Candidate | Votes | % | ±% | Expenditures |
|---|---|---|---|---|---|
| Conservative | Misty Van Popta | 12,121 | 49.56 | +39.3 | $59,960.42 |
| New Democratic | Megan Dykeman | 10,949 | 44.77 | -1.0 | $62,198.60 |
| Green | Rylee Mac Lean | 1,254 | 5.13 | -6.8 | $0.00 |
| Independent | Carlos Suarez Rubio | 134 | 0.55 | – | $500.00 |
| Total valid votes/expense limit | | 24,458 | 99.89 | – | $71,700.08 |
| Total rejected ballots | | 27 | 0.11 | – | |
| Turnout | | 24,485 | 58.00 | – | |
| Registered voters | | 42,213 | | | |
| Conservative notional gain from New Democratic | | Swing | | +20.1 | |
Source: Elections BC

== See also ==
- 43rd Parliament of British Columbia
