= Richmond-Bridgeport =

Provincial electoral district in British Columbia, Canada

British Columbia electoral district
- Location in Richmond
- Coordinates: 49.173°N 123.161°W

Provincial electoral district
- Legislature: Legislative Assembly of British Columbia
MLA
Teresa Wat
Conservative
- District created: 2015 (as Richmond North Centre)
- First contested: 2017
- Last contested: 2026

Demographics
- Population (2021): 54,724
- Area (km²): 453
- Pop. density (per km²): 120.8
- Census division: Metro Vancouver
- Census subdivision: Richmond

Richmond-Bridgeport is a provincial electoral district for the Legislative Assembly of British Columbia, Canada.

The district of Richmond North Centre was created in the 2015 redistribution from parts of Richmond Centre and Richmond East and first contested in the 2017 election. The riding adopted its current name and had minor boundary changes from the 2024 election, which implemented the results of the 2021 redistribution.

== Geography ==
The electoral district comprises the part of the city of Richmond (including Sea Island, Vancouver International Airport, Bridgeport, Thompson and Terra Nova) within the following boundary: commencing at the northwesternmost point of said city, east along the Fraser River until BC-99 and the Oak Street Bridge, thence southeast along said bridge to River Drive, thence east along said drive to Shell Road, thence south along said the road to Bridgeport Road, thence east along said road to No. 5 Road, thence south along said road to Alderbridge Way, thence west along said way to No. 3 Road, thence south along said the road to Westminster Highway, thence west along said highway to No. 2 Road, thence south along said road to Blundell Road, thence west along said road and its production to the western limit of said city.

== Members of the Legislative Assembly ==
This riding has elected the following members of the Legislative Assembly:

Richmond-Bridgeport
Assembly	Years	Member	Party
Richmond Centre prior to 2017
Richmond North Centre
41st	2017–2020	Teresa Wat	Liberal
42nd	2020–2023	Teresa Wat	Liberal
42nd	2023–2024	Teresa Wat	BC United
42nd	2024–2024	Teresa Wat	Conservative
Richmond-Bridgeport
43rd	2024–2026	Teresa Wat	Conservative
43rd	2026–2026	Teresa Wat	Independent
43rd	2026–2026 (Note: Rejoined the Conservatives after dissolution.)	Teresa Wat	CentreBC
44th	2026–present	Teresa Wat	Conservative

== Election results ==
Graph of the election results in Richmond North Centre (minor parties are combined into "Others")

=== Richmond-Bridgeport ===
2026 British Columbia general election
Party	Candidate	Votes	%	±%	Expenditures
Conservative	Teresa Wat	9,390	67.84	+9.65	
New Democratic	Linda Li	4,360	31.50	-3.27	
Total valid votes		13,750	99.34		
Total rejected ballots		92	0.66		
Turnout					
Registered voters					
Conservative hold		Swing		+6.46	
Source: Elections BC

2024 British Columbia general election
Party	Candidate	Votes	%	±%	Expenditures
Conservative	Teresa Wat	9,908	58.19	+57.0	$48,294.00
New Democratic	Linda Li	5,921	34.77	-6.1	$36,634.04
Green	Tamás Revóczi	547	3.21	-4.7	$1,148.70
Independent	Glynnis Hoi Sum Chan	519	3.05	–	$9,838.43
Independent	Charlie Smith	132	0.78	–	$0.00
Total valid votes/expense limit		17,027	99.68	–	$71,700.08
Total rejected ballots		54	0.32	–	
Turnout		17,081	48.63	–	
Registered voters		35,127			
Conservative notional gain from BC United		Swing		N/A (Note: Swing cannot be calculated as BC United did not run a candidate in this riding.)	
Source: Elections BC

2020 general election redistributed results
Party	%
Liberal	50.0
New Democratic	40.9
Green	7.9
Conservative	1.2

=== Richmond North Centre ===
2020 British Columbia general election: Richmond North Centre
Party	Candidate	Votes	%	±%	Expenditures
Liberal	Teresa Wat	7,675	51.26	−1.22	$41,998.62
New Democratic	Jaeden Dela Torre	5,964	39.83	+5.79	$6,837.05
Green	Vernon Wang	1,333	8.90	−1.57	$52.72
Total valid votes/expense limit		14,972	100.00	–	$66,123.96
Total rejected ballots		146	0.97	−0.01	
Turnout		15,118	40.36	−7.70	
Registered voters		37,459			
Liberal hold		Swing		−3.51	
Source: Elections BC

2018 British Columbia electoral reform referendum
Side	Votes	%
First Past the Post	8,702	73.35
Proportional Representation	3,161	26.65
Total valid votes	11,863	100.0
Total rejected ballots	61	0.51
Source: Elections BC

2017 British Columbia general election: Richmond North Centre
Party	Candidate	Votes	%	Expenditures
Liberal	Teresa Wat	7,916	52.48	$64,973
New Democratic	Lyren Chiu	5,135	34.04	$19,215
Green	Ryan Kemp Marciniw	1,579	10.47	$489
Independent	Dong Pan	336	2.23	$3,687
Action	John Crocock	117	0.78	$0
Total valid votes		15,083	100.00	
Total rejected ballots		149	0.98	
Turnout		15,232	48.06	
Registered voters		31,695		
Source: Elections BC

== Student vote results ==
Student Vote Canada is a non-partisan program in Canada that holds mock elections in elementary and high schools alongside general elections (with the same candidates and same electoral system).

2024 British Columbia general election
Party	Candidate	Votes	%	±%
Independent	Glynnis Hoi Sum Chan	16	3.06	–
New Democratic	Linda Li	153	29.25	-22.42
Green	Tamás Revóczi	133	25.43	+1.26
Independent	Charlie Smith	18	3.44	–
Conservative	Teresa Wat	203	38.81	+14.64
Total valid votes		523	100.0	–
Source: Student Vote Canada

2020 British Columbia general election
Party	Candidate	Votes	%	±%
New Democratic	Jaeden Dela Torre	62	51.67	+7.36
Liberal	Teresa Wat	29	24.17	-5.02
Green	Vernon Wang	29	24.17	-2.32
Total valid votes		120	100.0	–
Source: Student Vote Canada

2017 British Columbia general election
Party	Candidate	Votes	%
New Democratic	Lyren Chiu	289	40.99
Liberal	Teresa Wat	216	30.64
Green	Ryan Kemp Marciniw	161	22.84
Action	John Crocock	25	3.55
Independent	Dong Pan	14	1.99
Total valid votes		705	100.0
Source: Student Vote Canada

== See also ==
- List of British Columbia provincial electoral districts
- Canadian provincial electoral districts
