= 2020 British Columbia general election =

Canadian provincial election

- October 24, 2020

87 seats in the Legislative Assembly of British Columbia 44 seats needed for a majority
- Opinion polls
- Turnout: 54.50% ▼6.7 pp
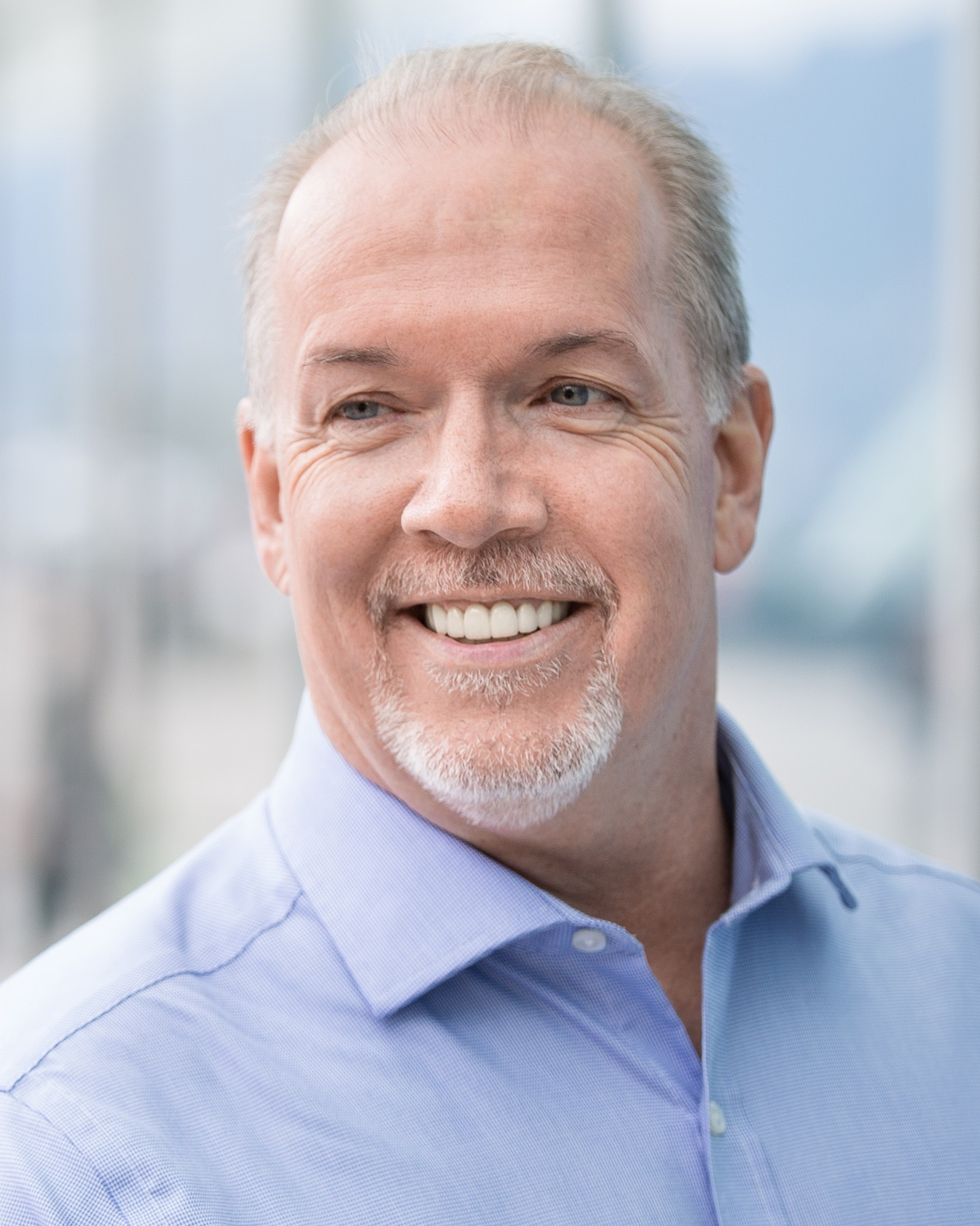

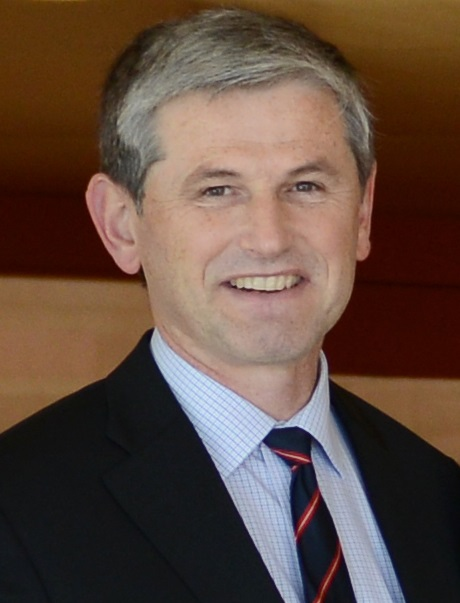

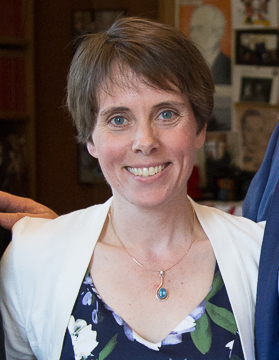
	First party	Second party	Third party
Leader	John Horgan	Andrew Wilkinson	Sonia Furstenau
Party	New Democratic	Liberal	Green
Leader since	May 4, 2014	February 3, 2018	September 14, 2020
Leader's seat	Langford-Juan de Fuca	Vancouver-Quilchena	Cowichan Valley
Last election	41 seats, 40.29%	43 seats, 40.37%	3 seats, 16.83%
Seats before	41	41	2
Seats won	57	28	2
Seat change	▲16	▼13	Steady
Popular vote	898,384	636,148	284,151
Percentage	47.69%	33.77%	15.09%
Swing	▲7.32 pp	▼6.52 pp	▼1.74 pp
- Popular vote by riding. As this is an FPTP election, seat totals are not determined by popular vote, but instead via results by each riding. Click the map for more details.

- Summary of the 2020 British Columbia general election
Premier before election
John Horgan
New Democratic
Premier after election
John Horgan
New Democratic

The 2020 British Columbia general election was held on October 24, 2020, to elect members of the Legislative Assembly to serve in the 42nd parliament of the Canadian province of British Columbia. The incumbent New Democratic Party of British Columbia (BC NDP) won a majority government, making John Horgan the first leader in the history of the BC NDP to win a second consecutive term as premier. The incoming Legislature marked the first time the NDP commanded an outright majority government in BC since the 1996 election, as well as the first province-wide popular vote win for the party since 1991.

Horgan called a snap election on September 21, 2020, the first early election in the province since the 1986 election. Horgan argued the call for an election a year before it was due was necessary because he was governing with a minority of seats in the Legislative Assembly. His decision was criticized as opportunistic by the NDP's confidence and supply partner, the British Columbia Green Party, and the province's Official Opposition, the British Columbia Liberal Party.

Liberal leader Andrew Wilkinson resigned two days after the election but remained as leader until November 23.

== Background ==
This election took place under first-past-the-post rules, as proportional representation had been rejected with 61.3% voting against it in the 2018 referendum.

Section 23 of British Columbia's Constitution Act provides that general elections occur on a fixed date of the fourth calendar year after the last election. The fixed election date was previously set for the second Tuesday in May – tentatively making the next election date May 12, 2021, but the BC NDP passed legislation in 2017 amending the section of the constitution to change the fixed election date to the third Saturday in October. Section 23 also indicates the fixed election date is subject to the lieutenant governor's prerogative to dissolve the Legislative Assembly as they see fit (in practice, on the advice of the premier or following a vote of non-confidence).

This prerogative was exercised on September 21, 2020, when Premier John Horgan called a snap election, thus dissolving the 41st Parliament. The writ of election was issued the same day, commencing a 32-day campaign. This was the first election in BC not to have been held on a set date in May since fixed-date elections had been introduced via amendments to the Constitution Act passed by the Liberal government under Gordon Campbell shortly after the Liberals came into power subsequent to the 2001 election. It was also the first time a BC government had gone to the polls before the expiration of its mandate since the Social Credit government under Bill Vander Zalm called an early election in 1986.

This election was the second Canadian provincial election held during the COVID-19 pandemic, after the September 2020 election in New Brunswick – also a snap election. Due to the pandemic, more than 720,000 people requested mail-in ballots. Elections BC expected that 35 to 40 percent of ballots would be sent by mail, compared to 1 percent historically. Advance voting took place between October 15 and 21, with more than 681,000 people voting ahead of the election date.

Due to the significant increase in mail-in voting, the full results of the election were not known until November 8; the results of the judicial recount held in one constituency, West Vancouver-Sea to Sky, were only known on November 17.

The election occurred only three years and five months after the 2017 election and during the first year of the COVID-19 pandemic in British Columbia. By the terms of the confidence and supply agreement that had been struck between the NDP and the Green Party, the NDP had been barred from calling a snap election and from holding an election before the fixed date. The premier defended his decision to call an early election, claiming that the province needed the government to have a strong mandate and stability to deal with the challenges of the pandemic for the coming years; the governing New Democrats did not have a majority of seats in the legislature, relying on confidence and supply from the Greens for a slim combined majority. An Ipsos poll conducted for Global News and radio station CKNW found that 46 percent of people disapproved of the snap election call, while 32 percent approved. Horgan and the BC NDP had been enjoying popularity in the polls during the summer and throughout the pandemic.

== Campaign ==
On September 21, 2020, the BC NDP chose Nathan Cullen, a longtime party member and former member of Parliament for the federal NDP, to be the New Democratic candidate in the riding of Stikine, which is located in northwestern BC and was previously represented by Doug Donaldson. Cullen, a white man, was nominated after the NDP attempted, but failed, to find a person wanting to run who was a person from an "equity-seeking" group, such as a woman or Indigenous person; the party's policy required that a vacancy left by a male MLA not running for re-election must be filled by a person from these groups. Annita McPhee, an Indigenous woman of the Tahltan Nation who had served as president of the Tahltan Central Government, previously declared her intention to become the NDP candidate, but was not considered by the NDP. The NDP said that McPhee's application contained invalid signatures, and Cullen was nominated before the paperwork problem could be resolved. According to a party official, McPhee had indicated that she did not want to be associated with the NDP following the 2019 federal election, which was denied by McPhee.

On September 28, BC Liberal leader Andrew Wilkinson promised a one-year tax holiday on the 7% provincial sales tax, at an estimated cost of $6.9 billion, and to thereafter set it to 3% for the following year, at an estimated cost of $3.9 billion, saying that it would stimulate the economy.

On September 30, NDP leader John Horgan promised to improve conditions at long-term care homes, at a cost of $1.4 billion.

The NDP filed a complaint to Elections BC against Liberal candidate Garry Thind, accusing him of violating the Elections Act by attempting to collect voters' information in order to provide them with a ballot.

On October 4, the BC Liberals announced that they would pause the transition in Surrey from an RCMP force to a local police department, and that they would hold a referendum of whether the city's switch to a local police department should be reversed.

On October 8, the NDP announced that they would commit to building, contingent on contributions from the federal government, the entire 16-kilometre (9.9 mi) SkyTrain Expo Line extension to Langley Centre by 2025.

== Retiring incumbents ==
=== Liberals ===
- Donna Barnett, Cariboo-Chilcotin
- Rich Coleman, Langley East
- Linda Larson, Boundary-Similkameen
- Linda Reid, Richmond South Centre
- Ralph Sultan, West Vancouver-Capilano
- Steve Thomson, Kelowna-Mission
- John Yap, Richmond-Steveston

=== New Democrats ===
- Carole James, Victoria-Beacon Hill, Deputy Premier and Minister of Finance
- Shane Simpson, Vancouver-Hastings, Minister of Social Development and Poverty Reduction
- Doug Donaldson, Stikine, Minister of Forests, Lands, Natural Resource Operations and Rural Development
- Scott Fraser, Mid Island-Pacific Rim, Minister of Indigenous Relations and Reconciliation
- Michelle Mungall, Nelson-Creston, Minister of Jobs, Economic Development and Competitiveness
- Judy Darcy, New Westminster, Minister of Mental Health and Addictions
- Claire Trevena, North Island, Minister of Transportation and Infrastructure

=== Independent members ===
- Andrew Weaver, Oak Bay-Gordon Head, former leader of the Green Party
- Darryl Plecas, Abbotsford South, Speaker of the Legislative Assembly

== Political parties ==
=== Major parties ===
==== Liberal ====
The British Columbia Liberal Party, a centre-right party, was led by Andrew Wilkinson. In the previous election, it won 43 seats but was reduced to 41 at dissolution. In the 41st Parliament, the BC Liberals served as the Official Opposition after briefly forming a minority government under then-premier Christy Clark, which was defeated on a confidence vote held 2 months after the 2017 British Columbia general election. The party ran candidates in all 87 ridings.

==== New Democratic ====
The British Columbia New Democratic Party (NDP), a social democratic centre-left party, was led by John Horgan. It had 41 seats in the outgoing Legislative Assembly and governed BC with a minority government. The party entered a confidence and supply agreement with the Greens following the previous election, allowing the NDP to form government despite being the party with the second-largest share of seats. It ran candidates in all 87 ridings.

==== Green ====
The Green Party of British Columbia, a green centre-left, was led by Sonia Furstenau. It won 3 seats in the previous election but had been reduced to 2 seats by the time the 2020 election was called. The Green Party supported the minority NDP government by providing confidence and supply. It ran candidates in 74 out of the 87 ridings.

=== Minor parties ===
Party	Leader	Candidates
Christian Heritage	Laura-Lynn Tyler Thompson	5
Communist	Timothy Gidora	5
Conservative	Trevor Bolin	19
Libertarian	Donald Wilson	25
Rural BC	Jonathan Van Barneveld	1
Vision	Jagmohan Bhandari	3
Wexit BC	Lee Smith	2

=== Independents ===
Along with the parties above, 24 individuals ran as independent candidates across 22 ridings.

== Debates ==
Leaders' debates of the 2020 British Columbia general election
No.	Date	Place	Organizer(s)	Topic	Moderator	Language	Participants				References
P Participant A Absent invitee N Non-invitee O Out of race (exploring, withdrawn or disqualified)							Andrew Wilkinson	John Horgan	Sonia Furstenau	Other leaders	References
1	October 13, 2020	Chan Centre, University of British Columbia	CBC News; CTV News; Global News; CityNews; CHEK; CPAC	Various	Shachi Kurl	English	P	P	P	N	
2	October 15, 2020	Radio, by telephone	CKNW	Various	Simi Sara	English	P	P	P	N	

== Results ==
Summary of the 2020 British Columbia general election
Party	Leader	Candidates	Votes				Seats		
Party	Leader	Candidates	#	±	%	Change (pp)	2017	2020	±
New Democratic	John Horgan	87	898,384	102,857▲	47.69	7.32	41	57 / 87	16▲
Liberal	Andrew Wilkinson	87	636,148	161,046▼	33.77	-6.52	43	28 / 87	15▼
Green	Sonia Furstenau	74	284,151	48,180▼	15.09	-1.74	3	2 / 87	1▼
Conservative	Trevor Bolin	19	35,902	25,481▲	1.91	1.38			
Independent		24	13,818	8,304▼	0.33	−0.20			
Libertarian	Donald Wilson	25	8,360	617▲	0.44	0.05			
Christian Heritage	Laura-Lynn Tyler Thompson	5	3,895	497▲	0.21	0.04			
Communist	Timothy Gidora	5	786	12▼	0.04	–			
Vision	Jagmohan Bhandari	3	761		0.04	New			
Rural	Jonathan Van Barneveld	1	754		0.04	New			
Wexit	Lee Smith	2	673		0.04	New			
Total		332	1,883,632		100.00%				
Blank and invalid votes			14,921	3,259▲					
Turnout			1,898,553	87,821▼	53.86%	7.32▼			
Registered voters			3,524,812	278,165▲					

=== Vote and seat summaries ===
Ternary plots – shift of electoral support (2017–2020)
2017

2020
Electoral districts identified by colours of winning parties

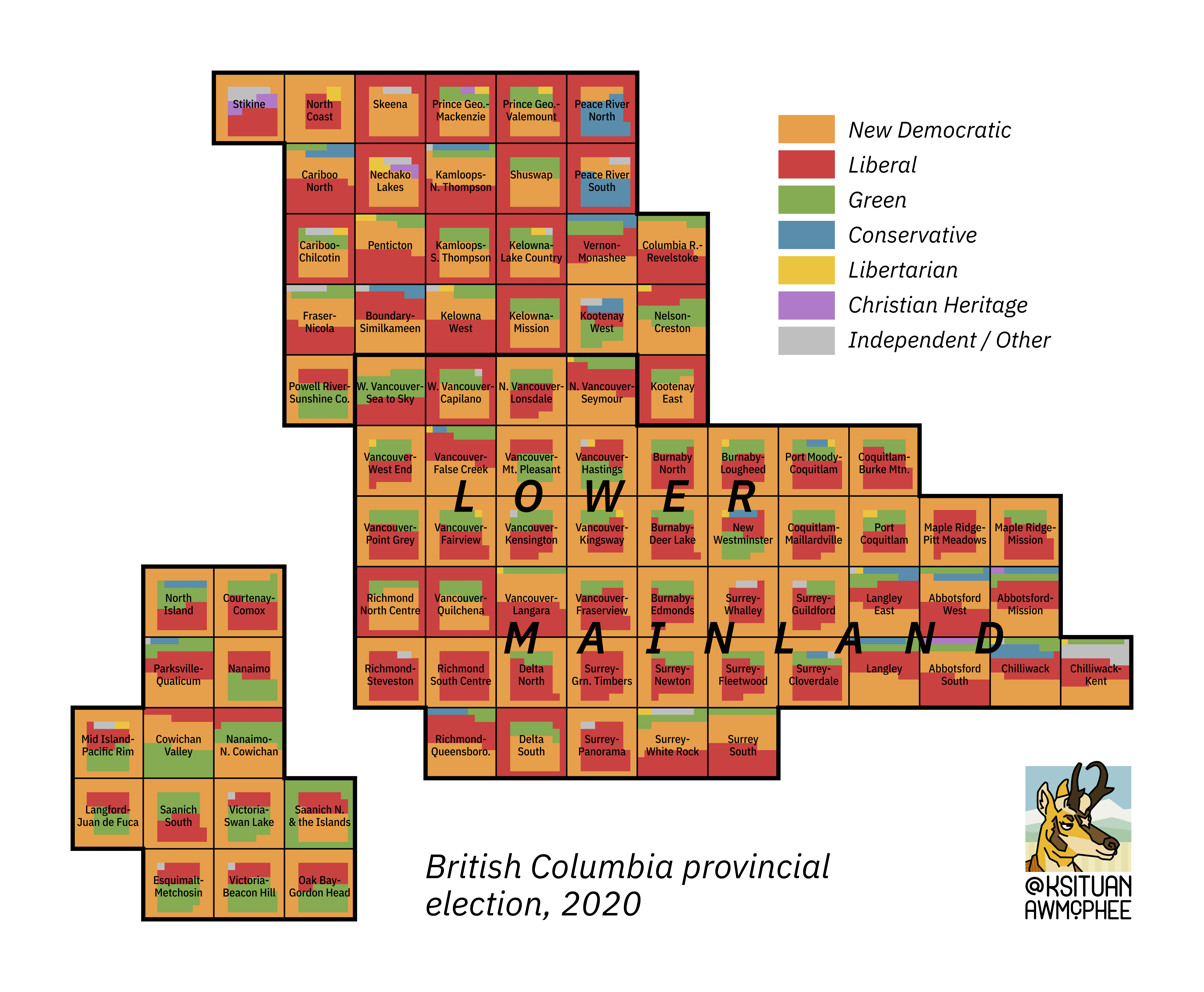
A cartogram showing the popular vote in each constituency

=== Synopsis of results ===
2020 British Columbia general election – synopsis of riding results
Riding (Note: Order as given in Elections BC reports)	Winning party								Turnout (Note: Including spoiled ballots)	Votes (Note: Minor political parties receiving less than 1% of the popular vote in 2020 or 2017)						
Riding	2017	1st place	Votes	Share	Margin #	Margin %	2nd place	3rd place	Turnout	NDP	Lib.	Green	Con.	Ind	Other	Total
Abbotsford-Mission	Lib.	NDP	10,364	41.07%	744	2.95%	Lib.	Grn.	53.45%	10,364	9,620	2,667	1,989	–	595	25,235
Abbotsford South	Lib.	Lib.	9,730	44.69%	2,024	9.30%	NDP	Grn.	48.46%	7,706	9,730	2,617	–	–	1,720	21,773
Abbotsford West	Lib.	Lib.	8,880	45.51%	1,761	9.03%	NDP	Con	49.96%	7,119	8,880	1,671	1,766	–	75	19,511
Boundary-Similkameen	Lib.	NDP	10,500	49.85%	2,765	13.13%	Lib.	Con	56.84%	10,500	7,735	–	2,354	–	474	21,063
Burnaby-Deer Lake	NDP	NDP	9,190	56.62%	4,027	24.81%	Lib.	Grn.	43.78%	9,190	5,163	1,878	–	–	–	16,231
Burnaby-Edmonds	NDP	NDP	11,063	62.01%	6,309	35.36%	Lib.	Grn.	44.36%	11,063	4,754	2,023	–	–	–	17,840
Burnaby-Lougheed	NDP	NDP	12,574	60.25%	7,188	34.44%	Lib.	Grn.	53.09%	12,574	5,386	2,628	–	–	281	20,869
Burnaby North	NDP	NDP	12,894	57.80%	6,048	27.11%	Lib.	Grn.	51.41%	12,894	6,846	2,568	–	–	–	22,308
Cariboo-Chilcotin	Lib.	Lib.	6,600	51.25%	2,420	18.79%	NDP	Grn.	50.56%	4,180	6,600	1,379	–	457	263	12,879
Cariboo North	Lib.	Lib.	5,367	48.42%	1,558	14.06%	NDP	Con	50.19%	3,809	5,367	707	1,201	–	–	11,084
Chilliwack	Lib.	NDP	7,349	41.56%	2,247	12.71%	Lib.	Con	47.04%	7,349	5,102	1,888	2,910	257	177	17,683
Chilliwack-Kent	Lib.	NDP	8,268	36.42%	1,304	5.74%	Lib.	Ind	52.03%	8,268	6,964	1,822	–	5,370 (Note: Green candidate Jeff Hammersmark ceased campaigning and endorsed independent candidate Jason Lum)	278	22,702
Columbia River-Revelstoke	Lib.	Lib.	7,034	48.03%	1,326	9.05%	NDP	Grn.	54.79%	5,708	7,034	1,904	–	–	–	14,646
Coquitlam-Burke Mountain	Lib.	NDP	12,627	54.94%	4,303	18.72%	Lib.	Grn.	50.43%	12,627	8,324	2,033	–	–	–	22,984
Coquitlam-Maillardville	NDP	NDP	12,278	59.70%	6,396	31.10%	Lib.	Grn.	52.48%	12,278	5,882	2,405	–	–	–	20,565
Courtenay-Comox	NDP	NDP	14,663	50.56%	6,008	20.72%	Lib.	Grn.	61.46%	14,663	8,655	5,681	–	–	–	28,999
Cowichan Valley	Grn.	Grn.	13,059	44.21%	1,184	4.01%	NDP	Lib.	59.85%	11,875	4,606	13,059	–	–	–	29,540
Delta North	NDP	NDP	12,215	56.78%	5,036	23.41%	Lib.	Grn.	56.55%	12,215	7,179	2,120	–	–	–	21,514
Delta South	Lib.	Lib.	12,828	51.70%	4,424	17.83%	NDP	Grn.	66.54%	8,404	12,828	3,581	–	–	–	24,813
Esquimalt-Metchosin	NDP	NDP	15,070	59.32%	8,930	35.15%	Grn.	Lib.	60.98%	15,070	3,940	6,140	–	254	–	25,404
Fraser-Nicola	Lib.	Lib.	5,696	41.64%	282	2.06%	NDP	Grn.	51.16%	5,414	5,696	1,788	–	781	–	13,679
Kamloops-North Thompson	Lib.	Lib.	9,341	40.99%	196	0.86%	NDP	Grn.	50.60%	9,145	9,341	2,224	1,928	149	–	22,787
Kamloops-South Thompson	Lib.	Lib.	13,453	51.14%	4,878	18.54%	NDP	Grn.	56.48%	8,575	13,453	4,276	–	–	–	26,304
Kelowna-Lake Country	Lib.	Lib.	14,679	55.73%	7,558	28.70%	NDP	Grn.	49.01%	7,121	14,679	3,833	–	190	515	26,338
Kelowna-Mission	Lib.	Lib.	13,483	50.76%	4,878	18.36%	NDP	Grn.	52.87%	8,605	13,483	4,476	–	–	–	26,564
Kelowna West	Lib.	Lib.	12,991	49.89%	4,137	15.89%	NDP	Grn.	48.87%	8,854	12,991	3,274	–	446	474	26,039
Kootenay East	Lib.	Lib.	9,897	57.90%	4,398	25.73%	NDP	Grn.	52.66%	5,499	9,897	1,697	–	–	–	17,093
Kootenay West	NDP	NDP	10,822	61.15%	7,782	43.97%	Grn.	Lib.	52.87%	10,822	1,975	3,040	1,447	413	–	17,697
Langford-Juan de Fuca	NDP	NDP	18,073	67.89%	13,636	51.22%	Grn.	Lib.	55.35%	18,073	3,980	4,437	–	–	130	26,620
Langley	Lib.	NDP	11,089	47.17%	3,075	13.08%	Lib.	Grn.	52.40%	11,089	8,014	2,469	1,936	–	–	23,508
Langley East	Lib.	NDP	13,169	42.56%	2,784	9.00%	Lib.	Grn.	58.35%	13,169	10,385	3,533	3,428	195	231	30,941
Maple Ridge-Mission	NDP	NDP	13,915	55.27%	5,503	21.86%	Lib.	Grn.	53.24%	13,915	8,412	2,849	–	–	–	25,176
Maple Ridge-Pitt Meadows	NDP	NDP	15,877	63.41%	6,714	26.81%	Lib.	None	56.11%	15,877	9,163	–	–	–	–	25,040
Mid Island-Pacific Rim	NDP	NDP	14,298	58.22%	9,307	37.89%	Grn.	Lib.	54.45%	14,298	4,291	4,991	–	610	370	24,560
Nanaimo	NDP	NDP	14,344	54.49%	8,266	31.40%	Grn.	Lib.	55.14%	14,344	5,903	6,078	–	–	–	26,325
Nanaimo-North Cowichan	NDP	NDP	12,787	49.48%	5,087	19.69%	Grn.	Lib.	56.20%	12,787	5,354	7,700	–	–	–	25,841
Nechako Lakes	Lib.	Lib.	4,611	52.24%	1,580	17.90%	NDP	CHP	49.91%	3,031	4,611	–	–	368	816	8,826
Nelson-Creston	NDP	NDP	7,296	41.78%	1,685	9.65%	Grn.	Lib.	58.39%	7,296	4,171	5,611	–	–	384	17,462
New Westminster	NDP	NDP	15,903	60.25%	10,883	41.23%	Grn.	Lib.	56.20%	15,903	4,291	5,020	912	–	269	26,395
North Coast	NDP	NDP	4,544	72.82%	3,115	49.92%	Lib.	Ltn	40.45%	4,544	1,429	–	–	–	267	6,240
North Island	NDP	NDP	12,467	50.75%	6,563	26.72%	Lib.	Grn.	53.93%	12,467	5,904	4,731	1,462	–	–	24,564
North Vancouver-Lonsdale	NDP	NDP	15,878	59.87%	8,604	32.44%	Lib.	Grn.	58.51%	15,878	7,274	3,369	–	–	–	26,521
North Vancouver-Seymour	Lib.	NDP	12,891	46.84%	3,064	11.13%	Lib.	Grn.	65.49%	12,891	9,827	4,514	–	–	291	27,523
Oak Bay-Gordon Head	Grn.	NDP	14,748	51.12%	7,386	25.60%	Grn.	Lib.	67.79%	14,748	6,597	7,362	–	–	142	28,849
Parksville-Qualicum	Lib.	NDP	13,207	42.00%	2,052	6.53%	Lib.	Grn.	64.65%	13,207	11,155	5,227	1,404	454	–	31,447
Peace River North	Lib.	Lib.	6,746	55.76%	2,596	21.46%	Con	NDP	46.48%	1,202	6,746	–	4,150	–	–	12,098
Peace River South	Lib.	Lib.	3,862	51.19%	1,559	20.67%	Con	NDP	41.66%	1,180	3,862	–	2,303	–	199	7,544
Penticton	Lib.	Lib.	13,217	48.19%	2,874	10.48%	NDP	Grn.	56.04%	10,343	13,217	3,152	–	–	717	27,429
Port Coquitlam	NDP	NDP	15,370	64.14%	10,361	43.23%	Lib.	Grn.	54.36%	15,370	5,009	3,023	–	–	563	23,965
Port Moody-Coquitlam	NDP	NDP	12,783	53.75%	5,530	23.25%	Lib.	Grn.	58.36%	12,783	7,253	2,802	800	–	144	23,782
Powell River-Sunshine Coast	NDP	NDP	12,701	50.88%	4,597	18.42%	Grn.	Lib.	59.98%	12,701	4,156	8,104	–	–	–	24,961
Prince George-Mackenzie	Lib.	Lib.	8,543	50.80%	2,826	16.80%	NDP	Grn.	49.06%	5,717	8,543	1,935	–	–	623	16,818
Prince George-Valemount	Lib.	Lib.	9,703	55.62%	4,986	28.58%	NDP	Grn.	47.42%	4,717	9,703	2,597	–	–	428	17,445
Richmond North Centre	Lib.	Lib.	7,675	51.26%	1,711	11.43%	NDP	Grn.	40.36%	5,964	7,675	1,333	–	–	–	14,972
Richmond-Queensborough	Lib.	NDP	9,406	47.65%	1,678	8.50%	Lib.	Grn.	49.56%	9,406	7,728	1,496	1,108	–	–	19,738
Richmond South Centre	Lib.	NDP	6,743	50.67%	179	1.35%	Lib.	None	40.12%	6,743	6,564	–	–	–	–	13,307
Richmond-Steveston	Lib.	NDP	10,733	52.07%	1,335	6.48%	Lib.	Ind	56.09%	10,733	9,398	–	–	483	–	20,614
Saanich North and the Islands	Grn.	Grn.	17,897	51.97%	7,907	22.96%	NDP	Lib.	67.66%	9,990	6,547	17,897	–	–	–	34,434
Saanich South	NDP	NDP	15,190	55.67%	8,582	31.45%	Lib.	Grn.	65.12%	15,190	6,608	5,488	–	–	–	27,286
Shuswap	Lib.	Lib.	13,300	51.35%	4,484	17.31%	NDP	Grn.	54.68%	8,816	13,300	3,784	–	–	–	25,900
Skeena	Lib.	Lib.	5,810	52.06%	849	7.61%	NDP	Ind	51.89%	4,961	5,810	–	–	389	–	11,160
Stikine	NDP	NDP	3,745	51.77%	1,841	25.45%	Lib.	CHP	50.13%	3,745	1,904	–	–	–	1,585	7,234
Surrey-Cloverdale	Lib.	NDP	12,992	52.10%	4,234	16.98%	Lib.	Grn.	55.16%	12,992	8,758	2,169	867	149	–	24,935
Surrey-Fleetwood	NDP	NDP	11,457	60.93%	5,681	30.21%	Lib.	Grn.	50.77%	11,457	5,776	1,571	–	–	–	18,804
Surrey-Green Timbers	NDP	NDP	8,171	59.59%	2,631	19.19%	Lib.	None	47.20%	8,171	5,540	–	–	–	–	13,711
Surrey-Guildford	NDP	NDP	10,403	60.59%	5,264	30.66%	Lib.	Grn.	45.69%	10,403	5,139	1,345	–	282	–	17,169
Surrey-Newton	NDP	NDP	8,893	62.64%	4,982	35.09%	Lib.	Grn.	47.91%	8,893	3,911	1,393	–	–	–	14,197
Surrey-Panorama	NDP	NDP	12,336	55.07%	2,729	12.18%	Lib.	Vis	51.65%	12,336	9,607	–	–	–	458	22,401
Surrey South	Lib.	Lib.	12,970	47.36%	1,176	4.29%	NDP	Grn.	52.74%	11,794	12,970	2,623	–	–	–	27,387
Surrey-Whalley	NDP	NDP	10,994	70.94%	6,942	44.80%	Lib.	Vis	40.59%	10,994	4,052	–	–	–	451	15,497
Surrey-White Rock	Lib.	Lib.	10,718	39.51%	224	0.83%	NDP	Grn.	61.23%	10,494	10,718	3,862	–	1,607 (Note: Independent candidate Megan Knight originally sought the Liberal nomination, but was shut out when Trevor Halford was directly appointed by the Liberal central office.)	443	27,124
Vancouver-Fairview	NDP	NDP	15,538	56.07%	7,968	28.75%	Lib.	Grn.	61.08%	15,538	7,570	4,368	–	–	234	27,710
Vancouver-False Creek	Lib.	NDP	11,484	46.77%	2,267	9.23%	Lib.	Grn.	51.06%	11,484	9,217	3,108	465	–	280	24,554
Vancouver-Fraserview	NDP	NDP	12,247	56.37%	4,736	21.80%	Lib.	Grn.	50.22%	12,247	7,511	1,969	–	–	–	21,727
Vancouver-Hastings	NDP	NDP	13,362	60.56%	9,050	41.02%	Grn.	Lib.	51.37%	13,362	3,885	4,312	–	–	505	22,064
Vancouver-Kensington	NDP	NDP	12,481	59.97%	7,226	34.72%	Lib.	Grn.	50.89%	12,481	5,255	2,874	–	202	–	20,812
Vancouver-Kingsway	NDP	NDP	12,297	67.81%	8,378	46.20%	Lib.	Grn.	44.50%	12,297	3,919	1,662	–	–	257	18,135
Vancouver-Langara	Lib.	Lib.	9,888	48.51%	1,457	7.15%	NDP	Grn.	49.45%	8,431	9,888	1,840	–	–	224	20,383
Vancouver-Mount Pleasant	NDP	NDP	14,530	66.95%	10,174	46.88%	Grn.	Lib.	48.01%	14,530	2,816	4,356	–	–	–	21,702
Vancouver-Point Grey	NDP	NDP	12,602	51.32%	4,890	19.91%	Lib.	Grn.	59.95%	12,602	7,712	4,241	–	–	–	24,555
Vancouver-Quilchena	Lib.	Lib.	12,157	56.04%	5,960	27.47%	NDP	Grn.	56.52%	6,197	12,157	3,341	–	–	–	21,695
Vancouver-West End	NDP	NDP	12,439	62.31%	8,425	42.21%	Lib.	Grn.	51.77%	12,439	4,014	3,250	–	–	259	19,962
Vernon-Monashee	Lib.	NDP	10,222	36.56%	424	1.52%	Lib.	Grn.	52.76%	10,222	9,798	4,464	3,472	–	–	27,956
Victoria-Beacon Hill	NDP	NDP	16,474	54.61%	7,443	24.67%	Grn.	Lib.	61.46%	16,474	4,329	9,031	–	335	–	30,169
Victoria-Swan Lake	NDP	NDP	14,186	59.35%	7,548	31.58%	Grn.	Lib.	59.02%	14,186	2,729	6,638	–	241	107	23,901
West Vancouver-Capilano	Lib.	Lib.	12,734	53.55%	5,540	23.30%	NDP	Grn.	58.10%	7,194	12,734	3,664	–	186	–	23,778
West Vancouver-Sea to Sky	Lib.	Lib.	9,249	37.54%	60	0.24%	Grn.	NDP	56.89%	6,197	9,249	9,189	–	–	–	24,635

= Open seat
= Turnout is above provincial average
= Winning candidate was in previous Legislature
= Incumbent had switched allegiance
= Previously incumbent in another riding
= Not incumbent; was previously elected to the Legislature
= Incumbency arose from byelection gain
= Incumbent ousted from party after nominations closed
= Other incumbents renominated
= Previously an MP in the House of Commons of Canada
= Multiple candidates

=== Comparative analysis for ridings (2020 vs. 2017) ===
Summary of riding results by vote share for winning candidate and swing (vs. 2017)
Electoral district	Winning party		Vote share		Swing (pp)	
Electoral district	Winning party		%	Change (pp)	To	Direction (pp) (Note: Positive indicates improvement to standing of party winning in 2017; negative points to 2017's second-place party being swung to.)
Abbotsford South	Lib	Hold	44.69	−7.80	NDP	−7.45
Abbotsford West	Lib	Hold	45.51	−9.71	NDP	−2.86
Abbotsford-Mission	NDP	Gain	41.07	11.90	NDP	−5.95
Boundary-Similkameen	NDP	Gain	49.85	17.12	NDP	−8.56
Burnaby North	NDP	Hold	57.80	9.23	NDP	4.36
Burnaby-Deer Lake	NDP	Hold	56.62	8.73	NDP	1.86
Burnaby-Edmonds	NDP	Hold	62.01	7.77	NDP	2.72
Burnaby-Lougheed	NDP	Hold	60.25	12.19	NDP	5.58
Cariboo North	Lib	Hold	48.42	−2.63	Lib	0.60
Cariboo-Chilcotin	Lib	Hold	51.25	−7.52	NDP	−3.11
Chilliwack	NDP	Gain	41.56	9.17	NDP	−4.59
Chilliwack-Kent	NDP	Gain	36.42	4.02	NDP	−2.01
Columbia River-Revelstoke	Lib	Hold	48.03	2.59	NDP	−1.48
Coquitlam-Burke Mountain	NDP	Gain	54.94	11.03	NDP	−5.51
Coquitlam-Maillardville	NDP	Hold	59.70	9.09	NDP	4.55
Courtenay-Comox	NDP	Hold	50.56	13.20	NDP	3.43
Cowichan Valley	Green	Hold	44.21	6.97	NDP	−4.29
Delta North	NDP	Hold	56.78	7.95	NDP	3.16
Delta South	Lib	Hold	51.70	7.60	N/A (Note: Nicholas Wong (independent in 2017, coming in at 2nd place) chose not to run in 2020.)	
Esquimalt-Metchosin	NDP	Hold	59.32	13.07	NDP	6.05
Fraser-Nicola	Lib	Hold	41.64	−0.15	NDP	−0.55
Kamloops-North Thompson	Lib	Hold	40.99	−7.33	NDP	−4.89
Kamloops-South Thompson	Lib	Hold	51.14	−4.64	NDP	−5.35
Kelowna West	Lib	Hold	49.89	−9.07	NDP	−4.38
Kelowna-Lake Country	Lib	Hold	55.73	−4.02	NDP	−5.09
Kelowna-Mission	Lib	Hold	50.76	−6.43	NDP	−8.79
Kootenay East	Lib	Hold	57.90	1.33	NDP	−0.58
Kootenay West	NDP	Hold	61.15	1.51	NDP	7.36
Langford-Juan de Fuca	NDP	Hold	67.89	15.14	NDP	13.15
Langley	NDP	Gain	47.17	12.56	NDP	−11.43
Langley East	NDP	Gain	42.56	13.72	NDP	−16.81
Maple Ridge-Mission	NDP	Hold	55.27	13.33	NDP	10.31
Maple Ridge-Pitt Meadows	NDP	Hold	63.41	18.61	NDP	10.40
Mid Island-Pacific Rim	NDP	Hold	58.22	9.17	NDP	8.69
Nanaimo	NDP	Hold	54.49	7.95	NDP	9.03
Nanaimo-North Cowichan	NDP	Hold	49.48	2.59	NDP	5.03
Nechako Lakes	Lib	Hold	52.24	−2.14	NDP	−3.34
Nelson-Creston	NDP	Hold	41.78	−0.41	Green	−2.19
New Westminster	NDP	Hold	60.25	8.32	NDP	7.18
North Coast	NDP	Hold	72.82	15.52	NDP	13.15
North Island	NDP	Hold	50.75	3.04	NDP	7.17
North Vancouver-Lonsdale	NDP	Hold	59.87	14.42	NDP	12.57
North Vancouver-Seymour	NDP	Gain	46.84	12.37	NDP	−11.52
Oak Bay-Gordon Head	NDP	Gain	51.12	27.50	Lib	−12.90
Parksville-Qualicum	NDP	Gain	42.00	13.33	NDP	−11.50
Peace River North	Lib	Hold	55.76	−10.52	N/A (Note: Bob Fedderly (independent in 2017, coming in at 2nd place) chose not to run in 2020.)	
Peace River South	Lib	Hold	51.19	−24.78	NDP	−8.20
Penticton	Lib	Hold	48.19	−4.61	NDP	−6.80
Port Coquitlam	NDP	Hold	64.14	8.34	NDP	8.74
Port Moody-Coquitlam	NDP	Hold	53.75	6.07	NDP	7.89
Powell River-Sunshine Coast	NDP	Hold	50.88	0.18	NDP	4.03
Prince George-Mackenzie	Lib	Hold	50.80	−6.32	NDP	−4.34
Prince George-Valemount	Lib	Hold	55.62	−2.58	NDP	−0.03
Richmond North Centre	Lib	Hold	51.26	−1.22	NDP	−3.50
Richmond South Centre	NDP	Gain	50.67	10.39	NDP	−4.89
Richmond-Queensborough	NDP	Gain	47.65	6.90	NDP	−4.59
Richmond-Steveston	NDP	Gain	52.07	12.72	NDP	−7.36
Saanich North and the Islands	Green	Hold	51.97	10.03	Green	5.79
Saanich South	NDP	Hold	55.67	13.21	NDP	10.02
Shuswap	Lib	Hold	51.35	−4.45	NDP	−5.77
Skeena	Lib	Hold	52.06	−0.17	NDP	−0.67
Stikine	NDP	Hold	51.77	−0.33	NDP	6.05
Surrey South	Lib	Hold	47.36	−3.58	NDP	−6.89
Surrey-Cloverdale	NDP	Gain	52.10	13.25	NDP	−12.90
Surrey-Fleetwood	NDP	Hold	60.93	7.35	NDP	6.68
Surrey-Green Timbers	NDP	Hold	59.59	1.30	Lib	−3.08
Surrey-Guildford	NDP	Hold	60.59	10.74	NDP	9.28
Surrey-Newton	NDP	Hold	62.64	5.33	NDP	3.89
Surrey-Panorama	NDP	Hold	55.07	4.21	NDP	1.59
Surrey-Whalley	NDP	Hold	70.94	12.32	NDP	8.13
Surrey-White Rock	Lib	Hold	39.51	−10.36	NDP	−9.23
Vancouver-Fairview	NDP	Hold	56.07	1.95	NDP	3.24
Vancouver-False Creek	NDP	Gain	46.77	6.30	NDP	−5.46
Vancouver-Fraserview	NDP	Hold	56.37	7.80	NDP	7.72
Vancouver-Hastings	NDP	Hold	60.56	0.58	NDP	2.23
Vancouver-Kensington	NDP	Hold	59.97	4.40	NDP	5.66
Vancouver-Kingsway	NDP	Hold	67.81	7.18	NDP	6.33
Vancouver-Langara	Lib	Hold	48.51	1.05	NDP	−1.12
Vancouver-Mount Pleasant	NDP	Hold	66.95	1.63	Green	−0.76
Vancouver-Point Grey	NDP	Hold	51.32	−4.62	Lib	−1.43
Vancouver-Quilchena	Lib	Hold	56.04	0.08	NDP	−0.23
Vancouver-West End	NDP	Hold	62.31	1.34	NDP	2.12
Vernon-Monashee	NDP	Gain	36.56	7.21	NDP	−10.02
Victoria-Beacon Hill	NDP	Hold	54.61	1.55	NDP	1.00
Victoria-Swan Lake	NDP	Hold	59.35	5.75	NDP	3.84
West Vancouver-Capilano	Lib	Hold	53.55	−3.60	NDP	−5.11
West Vancouver-Sea to Sky	Lib	Hold	37.54	−5.53	Green	−7.10

=== Changes in party vote shares ===
Share change analysis by party and riding (2020 vs 2017)
Electoral district	Conservative		Green		Liberal		NDP	
Electoral district	%	Change (pp)	%	Change (pp)	%	Change (pp)	%	Change (pp)
Abbotsford South			12.02	-2.98	44.69	-7.80	35.39	7.10
Abbotsford West	9.05	9.05	8.56	-2.27	45.51	-9.71	36.49	5.71
Abbotsford-Mission	7.88	7.88	10.57	-6.51	38.12	-13.07	41.07	11.90
Boundary-Similkameen	11.18	11.18	–	-10.23	36.72	-6.08	49.85	17.12
Burnaby North			11.51	-0.50	30.69	-8.73	57.80	9.23
Burnaby-Deer Lake	–	-3.22	11.57	-0.52	31.81	-3.73	56.62	8.73
Burnaby-Edmonds			11.34	-2.33	26.65	-5.44	62.01	7.77
Burnaby-Lougheed			12.59	-1.18	25.81	-11.15	60.25	12.19
Cariboo North	10.84	4.84	6.38	-1.00	48.42	-2.63	34.36	-1.20
Cariboo-Chilcotin			10.71	-4.30	51.25	-7.52	32.46	6.23
Chilliwack	16.46	16.46	10.68	-6.42	28.85	-19.57	41.56	9.17
Chilliwack-Kent			8.03	-6.83	30.68	-22.07	36.42	4.02
Columbia River-Revelstoke			13.00	1.28	48.03	2.59	38.97	2.95
Coquitlam-Burke Mountain			8.85	-2.97	36.22	-8.06	54.94	11.03
Coquitlam-Maillardville			11.69	0.78	28.60	-9.09	59.70	9.09
Courtenay-Comox	–	-7.55	19.59	1.22	29.85	-6.87	50.56	13.20
Cowichan Valley			44.21	6.97	15.59	-12.06	40.20	8.57
Delta North			9.85	-1.63	33.37	-6.32	56.78	7.95
Delta South			14.43	5.12	51.70	7.60	33.87	13.14
Esquimalt-Metchosin			24.17	-0.64	15.51	-12.11	59.32	13.07
Fraser-Nicola			13.07	-2.89	41.64	-0.15	39.58	1.11
Kamloops-North Thompson	8.46	8.46	9.76	-10.82	40.99	-7.33	40.13	9.78
Kamloops-South Thompson			16.26	-4.60	51.14	-4.64	32.60	10.70
Kelowna West			12.57	-1.07	49.89	-9.07	34.00	8.75
Kelowna-Lake Country			14.55	-4.80	55.73	-4.02	27.04	6.15
Kelowna-Mission	–	-7.34	16.85	2.61	50.76	-6.43	32.39	11.16
Kootenay East			9.93	-1.34	57.90	1.33	32.17	2.50
Kootenay West	8.18	8.18	17.18	1.19	11.16	-13.21	61.15	1.51
Langford-Juan de Fuca			16.67	-2.46	14.95	-11.15	67.89	15.14
Langley	8.24	3.20	10.50	-4.77	34.09	-10.31	47.17	12.56
Langley East	11.08	11.08	11.42	-4.83	33.56	-19.89	42.56	13.72
Maple Ridge-Mission	–	-3.57	11.32	-1.91	33.41	-7.29	55.27	13.33
Maple Ridge-Pitt Meadows	–	-2.51	–	-12.38	36.59	-2.19	63.41	18.61
Mid Island-Pacific Rim	–	-3.43	20.32	-0.02	17.47	-8.22	58.22	9.17
Nanaimo			23.09	3.17	22.42	-10.11	54.49	7.95
Nanaimo-North Cowichan			29.80	5.92	20.72	-7.47	49.48	2.59
Nechako Lakes			–	-9.00	52.24	-2.14	34.34	4.53
Nelson-Creston			32.13	3.97	23.89	-4.04	41.78	-0.41
New Westminster	3.46	3.46	19.02	-6.05	16.26	-4.95	60.25	8.32
North Coast			–	-9.03	22.90	-10.78	72.82	15.52
North Island	5.95	5.95	19.26	4.41	24.04	-11.30	50.75	3.04
North Vancouver-Lonsdale			12.70	-2.55	27.43	-10.71	59.87	14.42
North Vancouver-Seymour			16.40	-1.90	35.70	-10.66	46.84	12.37
Oak Bay-Gordon Head			25.52	-26.68	22.87	-0.88	51.12	27.50
Parksville-Qualicum	4.46	4.46	16.62	-8.82	35.47	-9.66	42.00	13.33
Peace River North	34.30	34.30			55.76	-10.52	9.94	3.37
Peace River South	30.53	30.53			51.19	-24.78	15.64	-8.39
Penticton			11.49	-6.98	48.19	-4.61	37.71	8.98
Port Coquitlam			12.61	-0.21	20.90	-9.15	64.14	8.34
Port Moody-Coquitlam	3.36	3.36	11.78	-0.33	30.50	-9.71	53.75	6.07
Powell River-Sunshine Coast			32.47	8.30	16.65	-7.88	50.88	0.18
Prince George-Mackenzie			11.51	0.27	50.80	-6.32	33.99	2.35
Prince George-Valemount			14.89	2.65	55.62	-2.58	27.04	-2.53
Richmond North Centre			8.90	-1.57	51.26	-1.22	39.83	5.79
Richmond South Centre			–	-11.00	49.33	0.61	50.67	10.39
Richmond-Queensborough	5.61	2.12	7.58	-5.14	39.15	-2.27	47.65	6.90
Richmond-Steveston			–	-13.05	45.59	-2.01	52.07	12.72
Saanich North and the Islands			51.97	10.03	19.01	-7.45	29.01	-1.55
Saanich South			20.11	-5.28	24.22	-6.83	55.67	13.21
Shuswap			14.61	-1.10	51.35	-4.45	34.04	7.09
Skeena					52.06	-0.17	44.45	1.16
Stikine					26.32	-12.43	51.77	-0.33
Surrey South			9.58	-2.27	47.36	-3.58	43.06	10.19
Surrey-Cloverdale	3.48	3.48	8.70	-3.67	35.12	-12.55	52.10	13.25
Surrey-Fleetwood			8.35	-1.33	30.72	-6.01	60.93	7.35
Surrey-Green Timbers			–	-7.25	40.41	7.46	59.59	1.30
Surrey-Guildford			7.83	-2.07	29.93	-7.82	60.59	10.74
Surrey-Newton			9.81	2.92	27.55	-2.44	62.64	5.33
Surrey-Panorama			–	-6.74	42.89	1.03	55.07	4.21
Surrey-Whalley			–	-10.76	26.15	-3.93	70.94	12.32
Surrey-White Rock			14.24	-1.94	39.51	-10.36	38.69	8.10
Vancouver-Fairview			15.76	2.24	27.32	-4.53	56.07	1.95
Vancouver-False Creek	1.89	1.89	12.66	-3.12	37.54	-4.62	46.77	6.30
Vancouver-Fraserview			9.06	1.34	34.57	-7.65	56.37	7.80
Vancouver-Hastings			19.54	1.87	17.61	-3.88	60.56	0.58
Vancouver-Kensington			13.81	2.34	25.25	-6.91	59.97	4.40
Vancouver-Kingsway	–	-2.54	9.16	-0.15	21.61	-5.48	67.81	7.18
Vancouver-Langara			9.03	-4.64	48.51	1.05	41.36	3.30
Vancouver-Mount Pleasant			20.07	3.14	12.98	-3.06	66.95	1.63
Vancouver-Point Grey			17.27	7.01	31.41	-1.75	51.32	-4.62
Vancouver-Quilchena			15.40	0.58	56.04	0.08	28.56	0.53
Vancouver-West End			16.28	2.38	20.11	-2.90	62.31	1.34
Vernon-Monashee	12.42	12.42	15.97	-5.60	35.05	-12.83	36.56	7.21
Victoria-Beacon Hill			29.93	-0.44	14.35	-1.14	54.61	1.55
Victoria-Swan Lake			27.77	-1.94	11.42	-4.45	59.35	5.75
West Vancouver-Capilano			15.41	-3.80	53.55	-3.60	30.25	6.62
West Vancouver-Sea to Sky			37.30	8.66	37.54	-5.53	25.16	-1.77

= did not field a candidate in 2017
= no candidate in either election

== Detailed analysis ==
Position attained in seats contested
Party	Seats	Second	Third	Fourth	Fifth	Sixth	Stood
New Democratic	57	27	3	–	–	–	87
Liberal	28	43	16	–	–	–	87
Green	2	15	53	4	–	–	74
Conservative	–	2	4	13	–	–	19
Independents	–	–	3	10	9	2	24
Christian Heritage	–	–	2	2	1	–	5
Vision	–	–	2	–	1	–	3
Libertarian	–	–	1	14	9	1	25
Communist	–	–	–	3	2	–	5
Wexit	–	–	–	2	–	–	2
Rural	–	–	–	1	–	–	1

Principal races, according to 1st- and 2nd-place results
Parties		Seats
█ New Democratic	█ Liberal	68
█ New Democratic	█ Green	16
█ Liberal	█ Conservative	2
█ Liberal	█ Green	1
Total		87

Resulting composition of the 42nd Legislative Assembly of British Columbia
Source		Party			
Source		NDP	Lib.	Grn.	Total
Seats retained	Incumbents returned	33	25	2	60
Seats retained	Open seats held	8	3		11
Seats changing hands	Incumbents defeated	11			11
Seats changing hands	Open seats gained	5			5
Total		57	28	2	87

=== Significant results among independent and minor party candidates ===
Those candidates not belonging to a major party, receiving more than 1,000 votes in the election, are listed below:

Riding	Party	Candidates	Votes	Placed
Abbotsford South	█ Christian Her.	Laura-Lynn Thompson	1,720	4th
Chilliwack-Kent	█ Independent	Jason Lum	5,370	3rd
Surrey-White Rock	█ Independent	Megan Knight	1,607	4th

== Results by riding ==
The following tables present results by riding per Elections BC.

- Names in **bold** are outgoing cabinet ministers, and names in italics are party leaders. The premier is in **both**.
- † denotes incumbent MLAs who are not seeking re-election.
- ‡ denotes incumbent MLAs who are seeking re-election in a different riding.
- A riding name in brackets below the name of the incumbent MLA indicates the name of the predecessor riding contested in the last election.
- Candidate names are given as they appeared on the ballot, and may include formal names and middle names that the candidate does not use in day-to-day political life. For example, Greg Kyllo appeared on the ballot as **Gregory James Kyllo**.

=== Northern British Columbia ===
Electoral district	Candidates					Incumbent
Electoral district	Liberal	NDP	Green	Libertarian	Other	Incumbent
Nechako Lakes	John Rustad; 4,611 – 52.24%	Anne Marie Sam; 3,031 – 34.34%		Jon Rempel; 403 – 4.57%	Dan Stuart (CHP) 413 – 4.68%; Margo Maley (ind.) 368 – 4.17%	John Rustad
North Coast	Roy Jones Jr. 1,429 – 22.90%	Jennifer Rice; 4,544 – 72.82%		Jody Craven; 267 – 4.28%		Jennifer Rice
Peace River North	Dan Davies; 6,746 – 55.76%	Danielle Monroe; 1,202 – 9.94%			Trevor Bolin (Cons.); 4,150 – 34.30%	Dan Davies
Peace River South	Mike Bernier; 3,862 – 51.19%	Cory Grizz Longley; 1,180 – 15.64%			Kathleen Connolly (Cons.) 2,303 – 30.53%; Dorothy Sharon Smith (Wexit) 199 – 2.64%	Mike Bernier
Prince George-Mackenzie	Mike Morris; 8,543 – 50.80%	Joan Atkinson; 5,717 – 33.99%	Catharine Kendall; 1,935 – 11.51%	Raymond Rodgers; 287 – 1.71%	Dee Kranz (CHP); 336 – 2.00%	Mike Morris
Prince George-Valemount	Shirley Bond; 9,703 – 55.62%	Laura Parent; 4,717 – 27.04%	Mackenzie Kerr; 2,597 – 14.89%	Sean Robson; 428 – 2.45%		Shirley Bond
Skeena	Ellis Ross; 5,810 – 52.06%	Nicole Halbauer; 4,961 – 44.45%			Martin Holzbauer (ind.); 389 – 3.49%	Ellis Ross
Stikine	Gordon Sebastian; 1,904 – 26.32%	Nathan Cullen; 3,745 – 51.77%			Rod Taylor (CHP) 831 – 11.49%; Darcy Repen (Rural) 754 – 10.42%	†**Doug Donaldson**

=== Kootenays ===
Electoral district	Candidates				Incumbent
Electoral district	Liberal	NDP	Green	Other	Incumbent
Columbia River-Revelstoke	Doug Clovechok; 7,034 – 48.03%	Nicole Cherlet; 5,708 – 38.97%	Samson Boyer; 1,904 – 13.00%		Doug Clovechok
Kootenay East	Tom Shypitka; 9,897 – 57.90%	Wayne Stetski; 5,499 – 32.17%	Kerri Wall; 1,697 – 9.93%		Tom Shypitka
Kootenay West	Corbin Kelley; 1,975 – 11.16%	**Katrine Conroy**; 10,822 – 61.15%	Andrew Duncan; 3,040 – 17.18%	Glen Byle (Cons.) 1,447 – 8.18%; Ed Varney (ind.) 224 – 1.27%; Fletcher Quince (ind.) 189 – 1.07%	**Katrine Conroy**
Nelson-Creston	Tanya Finley; 4,171 – 23.89%	Brittny Anderson; 7,296 – 41.78%	Nicole Charlwood; 5,611 – 32.13%	Terry Tiessen (Ltn.); 384 – 2.20%	†**Michelle Mungall**

=== Okanagan, Shuswap and Boundary ===
Electoral district	Candidates				Incumbent
Electoral district	Liberal	NDP	Green	Other	Incumbent
Boundary-Similkameen	Petra Veintimilla; 7,735 – 36.72%	Roly Russell; 10,500 – 49.85%		Darryl Seres (Cons.); 2,354 – 11.18% Arlyn Greig (Wexit); 474 – 2.25%	†Linda Larson
Kelowna-Lake Country	Norm Letnick; 14,679 – 55.73%	Justin Kulik; 7,121 – 27.04%	John Janmaat; 3,833 – 14.55%	Kyle Geronazzo (Ltn.) 515 – 1.96%; Silverado Socrates (ind.) 190 – 0.72%	Norm Letnick
Kelowna-Mission	Renee Merrifield; 13,483 – 50.76%	Krystal Smith; 8,605 – 32.39%	Amanda Poon; 4,476 – 16.85%		†Steve Thomson
Kelowna West	Ben Stewart; 12,991 – 49.89%	Spring Hawes; 8,854 – 34.00%	Peter Truch; 3,274 – 12.57%	Matt Badura (Ltn.) 474 – 1.82%; Magee Mitchell (ind.) 446 – 1.71%	Ben Stewart
Penticton	Dan Ashton; 13,217 – 48.19%	Toni Boot; 10,343 – 37.71%	Ted Shumaker; 3,152 – 11.49%	Keith MacIntyre (Ltn.); 717 – 2.61%	Dan Ashton
Shuswap	Greg Kyllo; 13,300 – 51.35%	Sylvia Lindgren; 8,816 – 34.04%	Owen Madden; 3,784 – 14.61%		Greg Kyllo
Vernon-Monashee	Eric Foster; 9,798 – 35.05%	Harwinder Sandhu; 10,222 – 36.56%	Keli Westgate; 4,464 – 15.97%	Kyle Delfing (Cons.); 3,472 – 12.42%	Eric Foster

=== Thompson and Cariboo ===
Electoral district	Candidates				Incumbent
Electoral district	Liberal	NDP	Green	Other	Incumbent
Cariboo-Chilcotin	Lorne Doerkson; 6,600 – 51.25%	Scott Andrews; 4,180 – 32.46%	David Laing; 1,379 – 10.71%	Katya Potekhina (ind.) 457 – 3.55%; James Buckley (Ltn.) 263 – 2.04%	†Donna Barnett
Cariboo North	Coralee Oakes; 5,367 – 48.42%	Scott Elliott; 3,809 – 34.36%	Douglas Gook; 707 – 6.38%	Kyle Townsend (Cons.); 1,201 – 10.84%	Coralee Oakes
Fraser-Nicola	Jackie Tegart; 5,696 – 41.64%	Aaron Sumexheltza; 5,414 – 39.58%	Jonah Timms; 1,788 – 13.07%	Dennis Adamson (ind.) 438 – 3.20%; Mike Bhangu (ind.) 343 – 2.51%	Jackie Tegart
Kamloops-North Thompson	Peter Milobar; 9,341 – 40.99%	Sadie Hunter; 9,145 – 40.13%	Thomas Martin; 2,224 – 9.76%	Dennis Giesbrecht (Cons.) 1,928 – 8.46%; Brandon Russell (ind.) 149 – 0.65%	Peter Milobar
Kamloops-South Thompson	Todd Stone; 13,453 – 51.14%	Anna Thomas; 8,575 – 32.60%	Dan Hines; 4,276 – 16.26%		Todd Stone

=== Fraser Valley ===
Electoral district	Candidates					Incumbent
Electoral district	Liberal	NDP	Green	Conservative	Other	Incumbent
Abbotsford-Mission	Simon Gibson; 9,620 – 38.12%	Pam Alexis; 10,364 – 41.07%	Stephen Fowler; 2,667 – 10.57%	Trevor Hamilton; 1,989 – 7.88%	Aeriol Alderking (CHP); 595 – 2.36%	Simon Gibson
Abbotsford South	Bruce Banman; 9,730 – 44.69%	Inder Johal; 7,706 – 35.39%	Aird Flavelle; 2,617 – 12.02%		Laura-Lynn Thompson (CHP); 1,720 – 7.90%	†Darryl Plecas (Note: Plecas was elected as a Liberal MLA, but was removed from the party after he was elected Speaker of the Legislative Assembly.)
Abbotsford West	Mike de Jong; 8,880 – 45.51%	Preet Rai; 7,119 – 36.49%	Kevin Eastwood; 1,671 – 8.56%	Michael Henshall; 1,766 – 9.05%	Sukhi Gill (Vision); 75 – 0.38%	Mike de Jong
Chilliwack	John Martin; 5,102 – 28.85%	Dan Coulter; 7,349 – 41.56%	Tim Cooper; 1,888 – 10.68%	Diane Janzen; 2,910 – 16.46%	Josue Anderson (ind.) 257 – 1.45%; Andrew Coombes (Ltn.) 177 – 1.00%	John Martin
Chilliwack-Kent	Laurie Throness (Note: Incumbent BC Liberal MLA Laurie Throness previously contested Chilliwack-Kent as the Liberal candidate, until his resignation from the party on October 15 to run as an independent candidate after comparing free contraception to eugenics. However, Throness is still considered by Elections BC to be the Liberal candidate.); 6,964 – 30.68%	Kelli Paddon; 8,268 – 36.42%	Jeff Hammersmark; 1,822 – 8.03%		Jason Lum (ind.) 5,370 – 23.65%; Eli Gagne (Ltn.) 278 – 1.22%	Laurie Throness
Langley	Mary Polak; 8,014 – 34.09%	Andrew Mercier; 11,089 – 47.17%	Bill Masse; 2,469 – 10.50%	Shelly Jan; 1,936 – 8.24%		Mary Polak
Langley East	Margaret Kunst; 10,385 – 33.56%	Megan Dykeman; 13,169 – 42.56%	Cheryl Wiens; 3,533 – 11.42%	Ryan Warawa; 3,428 – 11.08%	Alex Joehl (Ltn.) 231 – 0.75%; Tara Reeve (ind.) 195 – 0.63%	†Rich Coleman
Maple Ridge-Mission	Chelsa Meadus; 9,009 – 33.75%	Bob D'Eith; 14,721 – 55.15%	Matt Trenholm; 2,962 – 11.10%			Bob D'Eith
Maple Ridge-Pitt Meadows	Cheryl Ashlie; 9,163 – 36.59%	**Lisa Beare**; 15,877 – 63.41%				**Lisa Beare**

=== Surrey ===
Electoral district	Candidates				Incumbent
Electoral district	Liberal	NDP	Green	Other	Incumbent
Surrey-Cloverdale	Marvin Hunt; 8,758 – 35.12%	Mike Starchuk; 12,992 – 52.10%	Rebecca Smith; 2,169 – 8.70%	Aisha Bali (Cons.) 867 – 3.48%; Marcella Williams (ind.) 149 – 0.60%	Marvin Hunt
Surrey-Fleetwood	Garry Thind; 5,776 – 30.72%	Jagrup Brar; 11,457 – 60.93%	Dean McGee; 1,571 – 8.35%		Jagrup Brar
Surrey-Green Timbers	Dilraj Atwal; 5,540 – 40.41%	Rachna Singh; 8,171 – 59.59%			Rachna Singh
Surrey-Guildford	Dave Hans; 5,139 – 29.93%	Garry Begg; 10,403 – 60.59%	Jodi Murphy; 1,345 – 7.83%	Sam Kofalt (ind.); 282 – 1.64%	Garry Begg
Surrey-Newton	Paul Boparai; 3,911 – 27.55%	**Harry Bains**; 8,893 – 62.64%	Asad Syed; 1,393 – 9.81%		**Harry Bains**
Surrey-Panorama	Gulzar Cheema; 9,607 – 42.89%	Jinny Sims; 12,336 – 55.07%		Sophie Shrestha (Vision); 458 – 2.04%	Jinny Sims
Surrey South	Stephanie Cadieux; 12,970 – 47.36%	Pauline Greaves; 11,794 – 43.06%	Tim Ibbotson; 2,623 – 9.58%		Stephanie Cadieux
Surrey-Whalley	Shaukat Khan; 4,052 – 26.15%	**Bruce Ralston**; 10,994 – 70.94%		Jag Bhandari (Vision) 228 – 1.47%; Ryan Abbott (Comm.) 223 – 1.44%	**Bruce Ralston**
Surrey-White Rock	Trevor Halford; 10,718 – 39.51%	Bryn Smith; 10,494 – 38.69%	Beverly Hobby; 3,862 – 14.24%	Megan Knight (ind.) 1,607 – 5.92%; Jason Bax (Ltn.) 443 – 1.63%	Vacant (Note: Liberal MLA Tracy Redies held this seat before her resignation in 2020.)

=== Richmond and Delta ===
Electoral district	Candidates				Incumbent
Electoral district	Liberal	NDP	Green	Other	Incumbent
Delta North	Jet Sunner; 7,179 – 33.37%	Ravi Kahlon; 12,215 – 56.78%	Neema Manral; 2,120 – 9.85%		Ravi Kahlon
Delta South	Ian Paton; 12,828 – 51.70%	Bruce Reid; 8,404 – 33.87%	Peter van der Velden; 3,581 – 14.43%		Ian Paton
Richmond North Centre	Teresa Wat; 7,675 – 51.26%	Jaeden Dela Torre; 5,964 – 39.83%	Vernon Wang; 1,333 – 8.90%		Teresa Wat
Richmond-Queensborough	Jas Johal; 7,728 – 39.15%	Aman Singh; 9,406 – 47.65%	Earl Einarson; 1,496 – 7.58%	Kay Hale (Cons.); 1,108 – 5.61%	Jas Johal
Richmond South Centre	Alexa Loo; 6,564 – 49.33%	Henry Yao; 6,743 – 50.67%			†Linda Reid
Richmond-Steveston	Matt Pitcairn; 9,398 – 45.59%	Kelly Greene; 10,733 – 52.07%		Vince Li (ind.); 483 – 2.34%	†John Yap

=== Burnaby, New Westminster, and the Tri-Cities ===
Electoral district	Candidates				Incumbent
Electoral district	Liberal	NDP	Green	Other	Incumbent
Burnaby-Deer Lake	Glynnis Hoi Sum Chan; 5,163 – 31.81%	**Anne Kang**; 9,190 – 56.62%	Mehreen Chaudry; 1,878 – 11.57%		**Anne Kang**
Burnaby-Edmonds	Tripat Atwal; 4,754 – 26.65%	Raj Chouhan; 11,063 – 62.01%	Iqbal Parekh; 2,023 – 11.34%		Raj Chouhan
Burnaby-Lougheed	Tariq Malik; 5,386 – 25.81%	**Katrina Chen**; 12,574 – 60.25%	Andrew Williamson; 2,628 – 12.59%	Dominique Paynter (Ltn.); 281 – 1.35%	**Katrina Chen**
Burnaby North	Raymond Dong; 6,846 – 30.69%	Janet Routledge; 12,894 – 57.80%	Norine Shim; 2,568 – 11.51%		Janet Routledge
Coquitlam-Burke Mountain	Joan Isaacs; 8,324 – 36.22%	Fin Donnelly; 12,627 – 54.94%	Adam Bremner-Akins; 2,033 – 8.85%		Joan Isaacs
Coquitlam-Maillardville	Will Davis; 5,882 – 28.60%	**Selina Robinson**; 12,278 – 59.70%	Nicola Spurling; 2,405 – 11.69%		**Selina Robinson**
New Westminster	Lorraine Brett; 4,291 – 16.26%	Jennifer Whiteside; 15,903 – 60.25%	Cyrus Sy; 5,020 – 19.02%	Benny Ogden (Cons.) 912 – 3.46%; Donald Wilson (Ltn.) 269 – 1.02%	†**Judy Darcy**
Port Coquitlam	Mehran Zargham; 5,009 – 20.90%	**Mike Farnworth**; 15,370 – 64.14%	Erik Minty; 3,023 – 12.61%	Lewis Clarke Dahlby (Ltn.); 563 – 2.35%	**Mike Farnworth**
Port Moody-Coquitlam	James Robertson; 7,253 – 30.50%	Rick Glumac; 12,783 – 53.75%	John Latimer; 2,802 – 11.78%	Brandon Fonseca (Cons.) 800 – 3.36%; Logan Smith (Ltn.) 144 – 0.61%	Rick Glumac

=== Vancouver ===
Electoral district	Candidates					Incumbent
Electoral district	Liberal	NDP	Green	Libertarian	Other	Incumbent
Vancouver-Fairview	George Affleck; 7,570 – 27.32%	**George Heyman**; 15,538 – 56.07%	Ian Goldman; 4,368 – 15.76%	Sandra Filosof-Schipper; 234 – 0.84%		**George Heyman**
Vancouver-False Creek	Sam Sullivan; 9,217 – 37.54%	Brenda Bailey; 11,484 – 46.77%	Maayan Kreitzman; 3,108 – 12.66%	Naomi Chocyk; 280 – 1.14%	Erik Gretland (Cons.); 465 – 1.89%	Sam Sullivan
Vancouver-Fraserview	David Grewal; 7,511 – 34.57%	**George Chow**; 12,247 – 56.37%	Francoise Raunet; 1,969 – 9.06%			**George Chow**
Vancouver-Hastings	Alex Read; 3,885 – 17.61%	Niki Sharma; 13,362 – 60.56%	Bridget Burns; 4,312 – 19.54%	Golok Z. Buday; 321 – 1.45%	Kimball Cariou (Comm.); 184 – 0.83%	**†Shane Simpson**
Vancouver-Kensington	Paul Lepage; 5,255 – 25.25%	Mable Elmore; 12,481 – 59.97%	Nazanin Moghadami; 2,874 – 13.81%		Salvatore Vetro (ind.); 202 – 0.97%	Mable Elmore
Vancouver-Kingsway	Cole Anderson; 3,919 – 21.61%	**Adrian Dix**; 12,297 – 67.81%	Scott Bernstein; 1,662 – 9.16%	Karin Litzcke; 257 – 1.42%		**Adrian Dix**
Vancouver-Langara	Michael Lee; 9,888 – 48.51%	Tesicca Chi-Ying Truong; 8,431 – 41.26%	Stephanie Hendy; 1,840 – 9.03%	Paul Matthews; 224 – 1.10%		Michael Lee
Vancouver-Mount Pleasant	George Vassilas; 2,816 – 12.98%	**Melanie Mark**; 14,530 – 66.95%	Kelly Tatham; 4,356 – 20.07%			**Melanie Mark**
Vancouver-Point Grey	Mark Bowen; 7,712 – 31.41%	**David Eby**; 12,602 – 51.32%	Devyani Singh; 4,241 – 17.27%			**David Eby**
Vancouver-Quilchena	Andrew Wilkinson; 12,157 – 56.04%	Heather McQuillan; 6,197 – 28.56%	Michael Barkusky; 3,341 – 15.40%			Andrew Wilkinson
Vancouver-West End	Jon Ellacott; 4,014 – 20.11%	Spencer Chandra Herbert; 12,439 – 62.31%	James Marshall; 3,250 – 16.28%	Kim McCann; 259 – 1.30%		Spencer Chandra Herbert

=== North Shore ===
Electoral district	Candidates				Incumbent
Electoral district	Liberal	NDP	Green	Other	Incumbent
North Vancouver-Lonsdale	Lyn Anglin; 7,274 – 27.43%	Bowinn Ma; 15,878 – 59.87%	Christopher Hakes; 3,369 – 12.70%		Bowinn Ma
North Vancouver-Seymour	Jane Thornthwaite; 9,827 – 35.70%	Susie Chant; 12,891 – 46.84%	Harrison Johnson; 4,514 – 16.40%	Clayton Welwood (Ltn.); 291 – 1.06%	Jane Thornthwaite
West Vancouver-Capilano	Karin Kirkpatrick; 12,734 – 53.55%	Amelia Hill; 7,194 – 30.25%	Rasoul Narimani; 3,664 – 15.41%	Anton Shendryk (ind.); 186 – 0.78%	†Ralph Sultan
West Vancouver-Sea to Sky	Jordan Sturdy; 9,249 – 37.54%	Keith Murdoch; 6,194 – 25.16%	Jeremy Valeriote; 9,189 – 37.30%		Jordan Sturdy

=== Vancouver Island and Sunshine Coast ===
Electoral district	Candidates				Incumbent
Electoral district	Liberal	NDP	Green	Other	Incumbent
Courtenay-Comox	Brennan Day; 8,655 – 29.85%	Ronna-Rae Leonard; 14,663 – 50.56%	Gillian Anderson; 5,681 – 19.59%		Ronna-Rae Leonard
Cowichan Valley	Tanya Kaul; 4,606 – 15.59%	Rob Douglas; 11,875 – 40.20%	Sonia Furstenau; 13,059 – 44.21%		Sonia Furstenau
Mid Island-Pacific Rim	Helen Poon; 4,291 – 17.47%	Josie Osborne; 14,298 – 58.22%	Evan Jolicoeur; 4,991 – 20.32%	Graham Hughes (ind.) 610 – 2.48%; Robert Alexander Clarke (Ltn.) 370 – 1.51%	†**Scott Fraser**
Nanaimo	Kathleen Jones; 5,903 – 22.42%	Sheila Malcolmson; 14,344 – 54.49%	Lia Marie Constance Versaevel; 6,078 – 23.09%		Sheila Malcolmson
Nanaimo-North Cowichan	Duck Paterson; 5,354 – 20.72%	Doug Routley; 12,787 – 49.48%	Chris Istace; 7,700 – 29.80%		Doug Routley
North Island	Norm Facey; 5,904 – 24.04%	Michele Babchuk; 12,467 – 50.75%	Alexandra Morton; 4,731 – 19.26%	John Twigg (Cons.); 1,462 – 5.95%	†**Claire Trevena**
Parksville-Qualicum	Michelle Stilwell; 11,155 – 35.47%	Adam Walker; 13,207 – 42.00%	Rob Lyon; 5,227 – 16.62%	Don Purdey (Cons.) 1,404 – 4.46%; John St John (ind.) 454 – 1.44%	Michelle Stilwell
Powell River-Sunshine Coast	Sandra Stoddart-Hansen; 4,156 – 16.65%	Nicholas Simons; 12,701 – 50.88%	Kim Darwin; 8,104 – 32.47%		Nicholas Simons

=== Greater Victoria ===
Electoral district	Candidates				Incumbent
Electoral district	Liberal	NDP	Green	Other	Incumbent
Esquimalt-Metchosin	RJ Senko; 3,940 – 15.51%	Mitzi Dean; 15,070 – 59.32%	Andy Mackinnon; 6,140 – 24.17%	Desta McPherson (ind.); 254 – 1.00%	Mitzi Dean
Langford-Juan de Fuca	Kelly Darwin; 3,980 – 14.95%	**John Horgan**; 18,073 – 67.89%	Gord Baird; 4,437 – 16.67%	Tyson Riel Strandlund (Comm.); 130 – 0.49%	**John Horgan**
Oak Bay-Gordon Head	Roxanne Helme; 6,597 – 22.87%	Murray Rankin; 14,748 – 51.12%	Nicole Duncan; 7,362 – 25.52%	Florian Castle (Comm.); 142 – 0.49%	†Andrew Weaver (Note: Weaver was formerly the leader of the Green Party.)
Saanich North and the Islands	Stephen P. Roberts; 6,547 – 19.01%	Zeb King; 9,990 – 29.01%	Adam Olsen; 17,897 – 51.97%		Adam Olsen
Saanich South	Rishi Sharma; 6,608 – 24.22%	**Lana Popham**; 15,190 – 55.67%	Kate O'Connor; 5,488 – 20.11%		**Lana Popham**
Victoria-Beacon Hill	Karen Bill; 4,329 – 14.35%	Grace Lore; 16,474 – 54.61%	Jenn Neilson; 9,031 – 29.93%	Jordan Reichert (ind.); 335 – 1.11%	**†Carole James**
Victoria-Swan Lake	David Somerville; 2,743 – 11.35%	**Rob Fleming**; 14,384 – 59.49%	Annemieke Holthuis; 6,700 – 27.71%	Jenn Smith (ind.) 244 – 1.01%; Walt Parsons (Comm.) 107 – 0.44%	**Rob Fleming**

== Seats changing hands ==
11 incumbent MLAs lost their seats.

Party in 2017	Name	Constituency	Year elected	Seat held by party since	Defeated by	Elected party in 2020
BC Liberal	Eric Foster	Vernon-Monashee	2009	1996	Harwinder Sandhu	New Democratic
BC Liberal	Simon Gibson	Abbotsford-Mission	2009	2009	Pam Alexis	New Democratic
BC Liberal	John Martin	Chilliwack	2013	2001	Dan Coulter	New Democratic
BC Liberal	Laurie Throness	Chilliwack-Kent	2013	2013	Kelli Paddon	New Democratic
BC Liberal	Mary Polak	Langley	2005	1991	Andrew Mercier	New Democratic
BC Liberal	Marvin Hunt	Surrey-Cloverdale	2017	1991	Mike Starchuk	New Democratic
BC Liberal	Jas Johal	Richmond-Queensborough	2017	2017	Aman Singh	New Democratic
BC Liberal	Joan Isaacs	Coquitlam-Burke Mountain	2017	2017	Fin Donnelly	New Democratic
BC Liberal	Sam Sullivan	Vancouver-False Creek	2013	2009	Brenda Bailey	New Democratic
BC Liberal	Jane Thornthwaite	North Vancouver-Seymour	2009	1991	Susie Chant	New Democratic
BC Liberal	Michelle Stilwell	Parksville-Qualicum	2013	1996	Adam Walker	New Democratic

Open seats changing hands

Party in 2017	Candidate	Retiring incumbent	Constituency	Defeated by	Elected party in 2020
BC Liberal	Petra Veintimilla	Linda Larson	Boundary-Similkameen	Roly Russell	New Democratic
BC Liberal	Margaret Kunst	Rich Coleman	Langley East	Megan Dykeman	New Democratic
BC Liberal	Alexa Loo	Linda Reid	Richmond South Centre	Henry Yao	New Democratic
BC Liberal	Matt Pitcairn	John Yap	Richmond-Steveston	Kelly Greene	New Democratic
Green	Nicole Duncan	Andrew Weaver	Oak Bay-Gordon Head	Murray Rankin	New Democratic

== Student Vote results ==
Student votes are mock elections that run parallel to actual elections, in which students not of voting age participate. They are administered by Student Vote Canada. Student vote elections are for educational purposes and do not count towards the results. There were ties in two constituencies, Kelowna—Lake Country (BC Green and BC NDP) and Shuswap (BC Liberal and BC NDP), which were both counted twice.

Summary of the 2020 BC Student Vote
Party	Leader	Seats		Votes	
Party	Leader	Elected	%	#	%
New Democratic	John Horgan	58	65.17	33,655	39.86
Green	Sonia Furstenau	17	19.10	23,371	27.68
Liberal	Andrew Wilkinson	12	13.48	21,545	25.52
Conservative	Trevor Bolin	1	1.12	2,066	2.45
Christian Heritage	Laura-Lynn Tyler Thompson	1	1.12	336	0.40
Others		0	0	3,463	4.09
Total		87+2	100.0	84,436	100.0
Source: Student Vote Canada

== Opinion polls ==
=== Voter intention polling ===
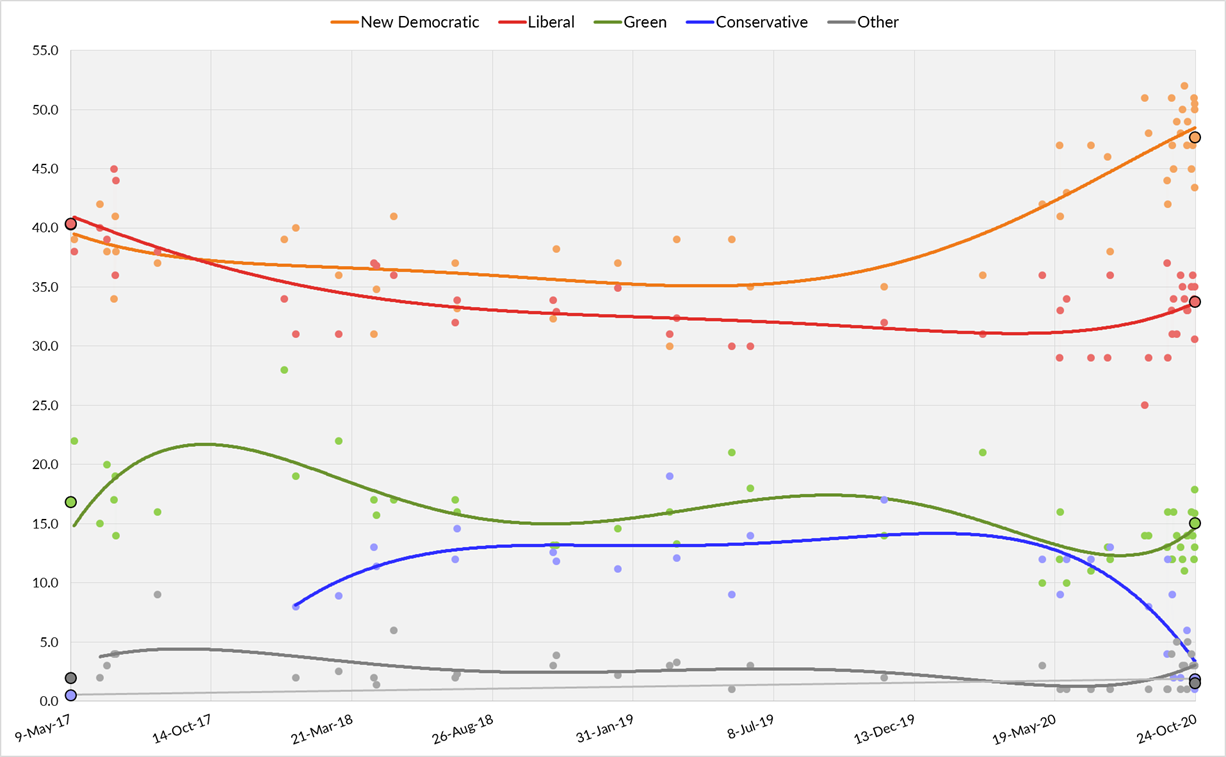

Opinion polling (2017–2020)
Polling firm	Date of polling	Sample size	Lib.	NDP	Grn.	Con.	Oth.	Lead	Type of poll	Margin of error
2020 election results	Oct 24, 2020	1,885,425	33.77%	47.70%	15.08%	1.90%	1.10%	14.00	N/A	N/A
Mainstreet	Oct 22–23, 2020	704	30.6%	50.5%	15.9%	N/A	3.0%	19.9%	IVR	3.7%
Research Co.	Oct 22–23, 2020	750	35%	50%	13%	2%	1%	15%	Online	3.6%
Forum Research	Oct 22–23, 2020	1,314	33.9%	43.4%	17.9%	N/A	4.8%	9.5%	IVR	3.0%
Ipsos	Oct 19–22, 2020	1,502	34%	51%	13%	N/A	2%	17%	Online/telephone	3.5%
Léger	Oct 18–21, 2020	1,100	36%	47%	14%	N/A	3%	11%	Online	3.0%
Angus Reid	Oct 16–19, 2020	1,201	35%	45%	16%	3%	1%	10%	Online	2.8%
Angus Reid	Oct 14–15, 2020	801	33%	49%	14%	3%	2%	16%	Online	3.5%
Insights West	Oct 13–14, 2020	1,030	33%	47%	14%	6%	1%	14%	Online	3.1%
Ipsos / Global BC, CKNW	Oct 8–11, 2020	1,000	34%	52%	11%	N/A	3%	18%	Online	3.5%
Léger	Oct 6–9, 2020	1,100	35%	50%	12%	N/A	3%	15%	Online	3.0%
Research Co.	Oct 5–7, 2020	750	36%	48%	13%	2%	1%	12%	Online	3.6%
Angus Reid	Oct 1–3, 2020	989	31%	49%	14%	N/A	5%	18%	Online	4%
Mainstreet/338Canada	Sep 26–29, 2020	1,041	34%	45%	16%	2%	N/A	11%	IVR	3.04%
Léger	Sep 24–28, 2020	802	31%	47%	12%	9%	N/A	16%	Online	3.5%
Ipsos	Sep 24–28, 2020	1,251	33%	51%	12%	N/A	4%	18%	Online/telephone	3.2%
Insights West	Sep 22–23, 2020	1,000	29%	42%	16%	12%	1%	13%	Online	3.1%
Research Co.	Sep 21–23, 2020	750	37%	44%	13%	4%	1%	7%	Online	3.6%
	Sep 21, 2020	Premier John Horgan announces a snap election to be held on October 24, 2020.								
	Sep 14, 2020	Sonia Furstenau is elected leader of the Green Party.								
Angus Reid	Aug 26 – Sep 1, 2020	655	29%	48%	14%	8%	1%	19%	Online	4%
EKOS Research Associates	Jul 18 – Aug 28, 2020	1,984	25%	51%	14%	N/A	11%	26%	Telephone	2.2%
Innovative Research Group	Jul 14–20, 2020	441	36%	38%	12%	13%	1%	2%	Online	N/A
EKOS Research Associates	Jun 16 – Jul 17, 2020	1,504	29%	46%	13%	N/A	12%	17%	Telephone	2.5%
Insight West	Jun 24–28, 2020	830	29%	47%	11%	12%	1%	18%	Online	3.4%
Innovative Research Group	Jun 19–23, 2020	268	32%	42%	12%	13%	0%	10%	Online	N/A
Innovative Research Group	May 29 – Jun 1, 2020	261	34%	43%	10%	12%	1%	9%	Online	N/A
Research Co.	May 23–25, 2020	800	33%	41%	16%	9%	1%	8%	Online	3.5%
Angus Reid	May 19–24, 2020	603	29%	47%	12%	10%	2%	18%	Online	1.4%
Innovative Research Group	May 1–5, 2020	261	36%	42%	10%	12%	3%	6%	Online	N/A
Angus Reid	Feb 24–28, 2020	608	31%	36%	21%	10%	2%	5%	Online	3%–6.6%
	Jan 6, 2020	Adam Olsen is chosen as interim leader of the Green Party.								
Insight West	Nov 7–9, 2019	808	32%	35%	14%	17%	2%	3%	Online	3.4%
	Oct 7, 2019	Andrew Weaver announces his resignation as leader of the Green Party.								
Insights West	Jun 6–12, 2019	848	30%	35%	18%	14%	3%	5%	Online	4.3%
Research Co.	May 20–22, 2019	800	30%	39%	21%	9%	1%	9%	Online	3.5%
	Apr 8, 2019	Trevor Bolin is elected leader of the BC Conservatives.								
Mainstreet	Mar 20–21, 2019	923	32.4%	39.0%	13.3%	12.1%	3.3%	6.6%	Telephone	3.23%
Justason	Feb 26 – Mar 13, 2019	812	31%	30%	16%	19%	3%	1%	Telephone	3.4%
Mainstreet	Jan 13–14, 2019	887	34.9%	37.0%	14.6%	11.2%	2.2%	2.1%	Telephone	3.29%
Insights West	Nov 2–6, 2018	814	32.9%	38.2%	13.2%	11.8%	3.9%	5.3%	N/A	N/A
Mainstreet	Oct 31 – Nov 2, 2018	616	33.9%	32.3%	18.2%	12.6%	3%	1.6%	Telephone	3.92%
Mainstreet	Jul 15–17, 2018	933	33.9%	33.2%	16.0%	14.6%	2.3%	0.7%	Telephone	3.21%
Insights West	Jul 12–15, 2018	1,053	32%	37%	17%	12%	2%	5%	Online	3.0%
Angus Reid	May 4–7, 2018	809	36%	41%	17%	N/A	6%	5%	Online	3.4%
Mainstreet	Apr 16–18, 2018	900	36.8%	34.8%	15.7%	11.4%	1.4%	2.0%	Telephone	3.27%
Mainstreet	Apr 12–15, 2018	1,496	37%	31%	17%	13%	2%	6%	Telephone	2.53%
Mainstreet	Mar 5–6, 2018	1,511	30.7%	36.0%	21.9%	8.9%	2.5%	5.3%	Telephone	2.52%
	Feb 3, 2018	Andrew Wilkinson is elected leader of the BC Liberals and becomes the leader of the Opposition.								
Insights West	Jan 15–17, 2018	829	31%	40%	19%	8%	2%	9%	Online	3.4%
Mainstreet	Jan 3–4, 2018	817	33.9%	38.5%	27.6%	N/A	N/A	4.6%	Telephone	3.24%
Mainstreet	Aug 14–15, 2017	2,050	38%	37%	16%	N/A	9%	1%	Telephone	2.16%
	Aug 4, 2017	Christy Clark resigns as leader of the BC Liberals and Rich Coleman is chosen as interim leader.								
	Jul 18, 2017	John Horgan becomes premier of British Columbia.								
	Jun 29, 2017	Christy Clark resigns as premier; John Horgan is invited to form government.								
	Jun 29, 2017	BC Liberal government is defeated in a confidence vote.								
Ipsos	Jun 26–28, 2017	800	44%	38%	14%	N/A	4%	6%	Online	3.9%
Insights West	Jun 23–28, 2017	821	36%	41%	19%	N/A	4%	5%	Online	3.4%
Mainstreet/Postmedia	Jun 26–27, 2017	1,650	45%	34%	17%	N/A	4%	11%	N/A	2.41%
Angus Reid	Jun 15–19, 2017	810	39%	38%	20%	N/A	3%	1%	Online	3.4%
Ipsos	Jun 8–11, 2017	802	40%	42%	15%	N/A	2%	2%	Online	3.9%
Mainstreet/Postmedia	May 11–13, 2017	1,650	38%	39%	22%	N/A	N/A	1%	Telephone	3.41%
2017 election results	May 9, 2017	N/A	40.4%	40.3%	16.8%	0.5%	2.5%	0.1%	N/A	N/A

=== Preferred premier polling ===
Polling organization / client	Dates	Sample size	Andrew Wilkinson / Christy Clark	John Horgan	Sonia Furstenau / Andrew Weaver	Other/undecided	Lead	Polling method	Margin of error
Ipsos / Global BC, CKNW	Oct 8–11, 2020	1,000	16%	45%	6%	33%	29%	Online	3.5%
Research Co.	Oct 5–7, 2020	1,000	27%	47%	6%	19%	20%	Online	3.7%
Ipsos / Global News, CKNW	Sep 24–28, 2020	1,251	14%	44%	6%	36%	30%	Online/Telephone	3.2%
Research Co.	Sep 21–23, 2020	750	27%	44%	7%	33%	17%	Online	3.6%
Ipsos	Jun 26–28, 2017	800	31%	28%	11%	31%	3%	Online	3.9%
Ipsos	Jun 8–11, 2017	802	29%	28%	12%	31%	1%	Online	3.9%
