= Bob Chisholm =

Canadian politician (born 1947)

Member of the British Columbia Legislative Assembly for Chilliwack
- In office October 17, 1991 – May 28, 1996
- Preceded by: John Jansen
- Succeeded by: Barry Penner

Personal details
- Born: January 7, 1947 (age 79) Brantford, Ontario
- Party: British Columbia Liberal Party

Robert Malcolm Chisholm (born January 7, 1947) was a Canadian politician. He served in the Legislative Assembly of British Columbia from 1991 until his defeat in the 1996 provincial election, initially as a Liberal member for the constituency of Chilliwack, and then as an Independent member.
