= John Martin (British Columbia politician) =

Canadian politician and professor

John Martin MLA
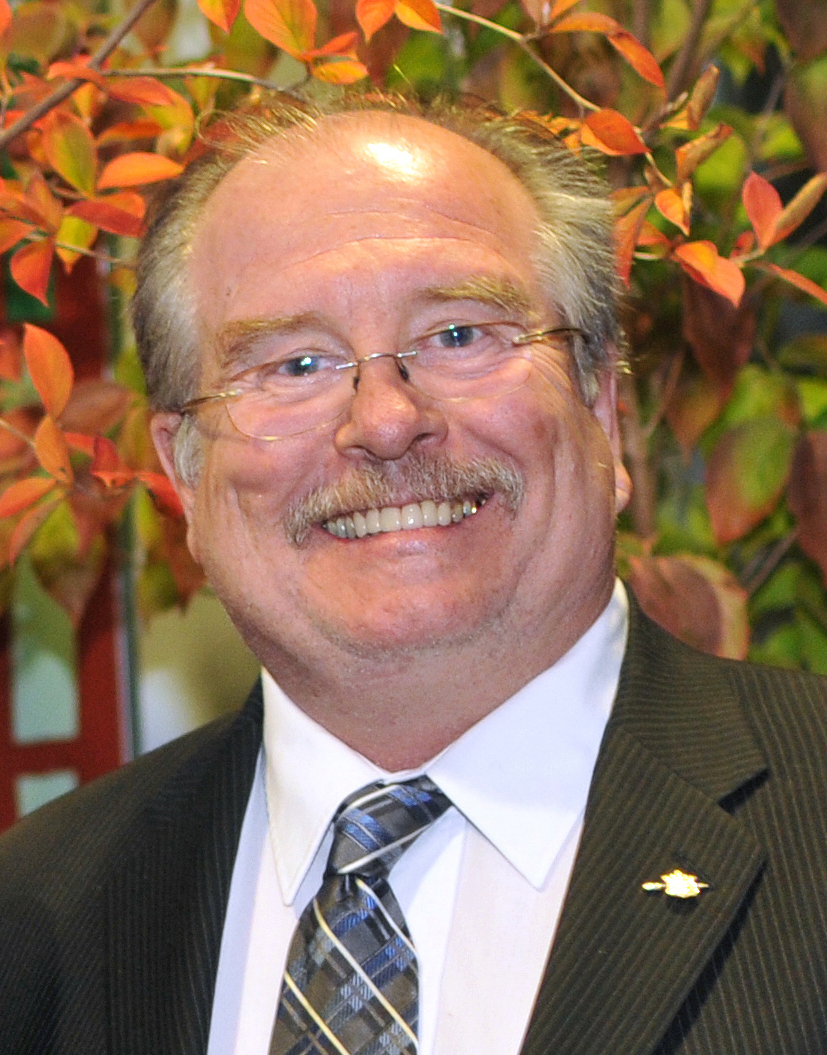

Member of the British Columbia Legislative Assembly for Chilliwack
- In office May 14, 2013 – September 21, 2020
- Preceded by: John Les
- Succeeded by: Dan Coulter

Personal details
- Born: 1958 or 1959 (age 67–68)
- Party: BC Liberal
- Other political affiliations: BC Conservative (former)
- Spouse: Margaret
- Profession: criminologist and professor

John Martin (born 1958 or 1959) is a Canadian politician and a professor of criminology, who was elected to the Legislative Assembly of British Columbia in the 2013 provincial election. He represented the electoral district of Chilliwack as a member of the British Columbia Liberal Party.

== Academia ==
Martin was an associate professor at the School of Criminology and Criminal Justice, teaching courses at the University of the Fraser Valley until his retirement in 2013, and a research associate at the UFV Centre for Criminal Justice Research. (Note: The centre was formerly called the Centre for Criminal Justice Social Research, and as of sometime prior to 2017 is also known as the Centre for Public Safety and Criminal Justice Research.) In addition to his work at the UFV-Chilliwack campus, Martin also taught criminal justice classes at Douglas College, Native Education Centre, Lethbridge College, Pacific Regional Training Centre (for RCMP members), and the Staff College of the Correctional Service of Canada, as well as a Canadian Studies class at Takushoku University in Japan.

Martin received a B.A. and then an M.A. from Simon Fraser University, both in criminology, and also received a diploma in Criminal Justice from the University of the Fraser Valley.

== Politics ==
Martin announced on December 5, 2011 that he would seek the British Columbia Conservative party nomination in the Chilliwack-Hope by-election. He became the Tory nominee (was acclaimed as the British Columbia Conservative Party candidate) in 2012, and also was named a member of the minority party shadow cabinet as a counterpart to the then-Liberal-party-member Attorney General of British Columbia. Martin was first elected, as a member of the British Columbia Liberal Party, during the May 2013 provincial election. From 2017-2020, Martin represented the Chilliwack district as a member of the Legislative Assembly of British Columbia in Victoria.

In government, he served as Parliamentary Secretary to the Minister of Forests, Lands and Natural Resource Operations. In Opposition, he served as the Official Opposition critic for Labour.

Martin has written columns for The Vancouver Province, The Chilliwack Times, and The Abbotsford Times; he received a Certificate of Technology in Broadcast Communications from the British Columbia Institute of Technology.

== Electoral record ==
2020 British Columbia general election: Chilliwack
Party	Candidate	Votes	%	±%	Expenditures
New Democratic	Dan Coulter	7,349	41.56	+9.18	$5,919.34
Liberal	John Martin	5,102	28.85	−19.57	$36,378.86
Conservative	Diane Janzen	2,910	16.46	–	$20,583.54
Green	Tim Cooper	1,888	10.68	−6.42	$2,161.84
Independent	Josue Anderson	257	1.45	–	$2,965.16
Libertarian	Andrew Coombes	177	1.00	–	$0.00
Total valid votes		17,683	100.00	–	
Total rejected ballots		216	1.21		
Turnout		17,899	47.04		
Registered voters		38,054			
New Democratic gain from Liberal		Swing		+14.38	
Source: Elections BC

2017 British Columbia general election: Chilliwack
Party	Candidate	Votes	%	±%	Expenditures
Liberal	John Martin	9,280	48.42	+0.84	$43,462
New Democratic	Tracey Lorrean O'Hara	6,207	32.38	+1.17	$7,077
Green	Wayne Froese	3,277	17.10	+8.71	$855
Independent	Ryan McKinnon	402	2.10	–	
Total valid votes		19,166	100.00		
Total rejected ballots		139	0.72		
Turnout		19,305	55.43		
Liberal hold		Swing		−0.17	
Source: Elections BC

2013 British Columbia general election: Chilliwack
Party	Candidate	Votes	%
Liberal	John Martin	9,983	47.58
New Democratic	Patti MacAhonic	6,548	31.21
Conservative	Chad Elton Eros	2,510	11.96
Green	Kim Reimer	1,761	8.39
Excalibur	Michael Raymond Halliday	181	0.86
Total valid votes		21,002	100.00
Total rejected ballots		101	0.48
Turnout		21,103	55.85
Source: Elections BC

British Columbia provincial by-election, April 19, 2012: Chilliwack-Hope
Party	Candidate	Votes	%	±%
New Democratic	Gwen O'Mahony	6,022	41.89	+8
Liberal	Laurie Throness	4,593	31.95	-22
Conservative	John Martin	3,615	25.15	+18
Libertarian	Lewis Dahlby	145	1.01	
Total valid votes		14,375		
Total rejected ballots		26		
Turnout		14,401	41.12	
"Report of the Chief Electoral Officer on the Port Moody-Coquitlam and Chilliwack-Hope By-elections" (PDF). Elections B.C.

== Personal life ==
Raised in Canada (lower mainland), married (wife Margaret), and a Chilliwack resident (member of the local Royal Canadian Legion).
