= Chilliwack-Hope =

Chilliwack-Hope may refer to:

- Chilliwack—Hope (federal electoral district)
- Chilliwack-Hope (provincial electoral district)
