= Laurie Throness =

Canadian politician

Laurie Throness MLA
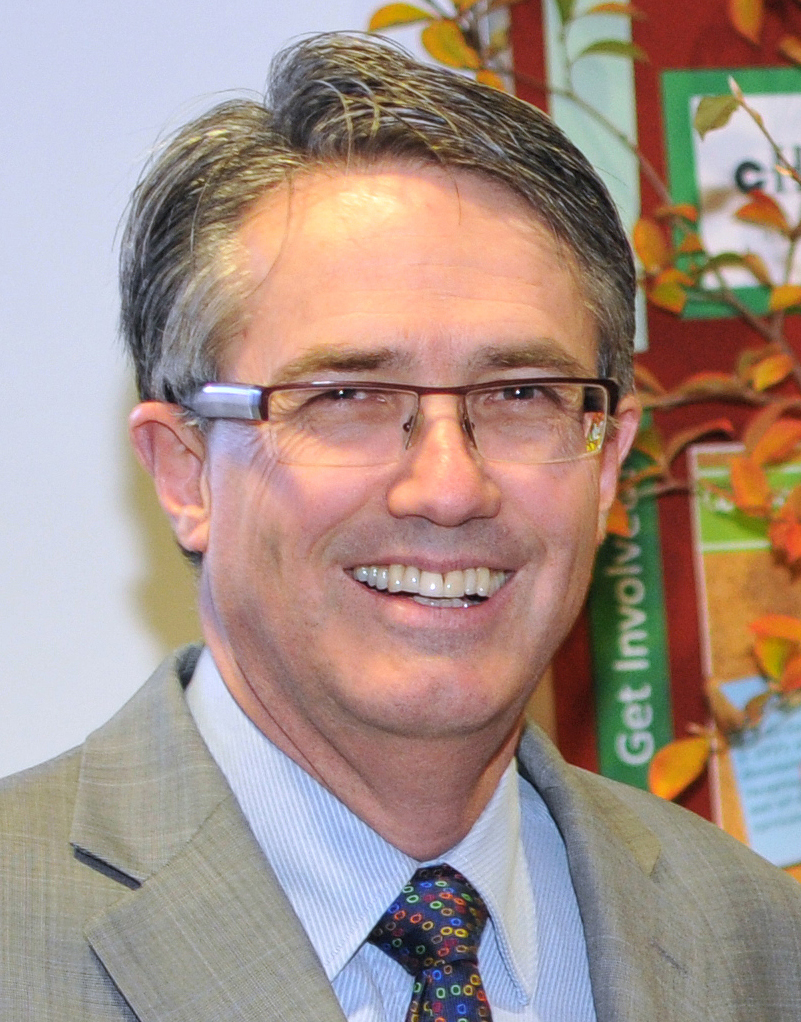

Member of the British Columbia Legislative Assembly for Chilliwack-Kent Chilliwack-Hope (2013–2017)
- In office May 14, 2013 – September 21, 2020
- Preceded by: Gwen O'Mahony
- Succeeded by: Kelli Paddon

Personal details
- Born: 1959 or 1960 (age 66–67) Grande Prairie, Alberta
- Party: BC Liberal; Independent (Note: Incumbent BC Liberal MLA Laurie Throness previously contested Chilliwack-Kent as the Liberal candidate, until his resignation from the party on October 15 to run as an independent candidate after comparing free contraception to eugenics. However, Throness is still considered by Elections BC to be the Liberal candidate.)
- Education: University of Cambridge
- Profession: Historian

Laurie Throness (born 1958) is a Canadian politician, who was elected to the Legislative Assembly of British Columbia in the 2013 provincial election. He represented the electoral district of Chilliwack-Kent as a member of the British Columbia Liberal Party. After making controversial remarks regarding the NDP's free contraception plan, he resigned from the BC Liberal Party caucus on October 15, 2020. He ran as an independent candidate in the 2020 BC general election. Before becoming a politician, Throness earned a place at the University of Cambridge where he studied for a PhD in history. After Cambridge, he went on to publish a book in 2008 on the theological origins of the Penitentiary Act 1779.

Throness was previously the party's candidate in the electoral district of Chilliwack-Hope in a by-election in 2012, following the resignation of Barry Penner, but was defeated by Gwen O'Mahony of the New Democrats. He defeated O'Mahony in the 2013 general election, capturing 49.15% of votes cast compared to her 36.01% share of the vote. The BC Conservative candidate received 10.77% of the votes, and the Green Party candidate received 4.07%.

In government, he served as the Parliamentary Secretary for Corrections and in Opposition he served as the Official Opposition Critic for Children and Family Development.

He was elected to the board of Chilliwack School District in 2025 via a by-election.

== Political views and controversy ==
Throness has leaned towards conservative political and social views, and has made anti-LGBTQ comments. In July 2020, he defended advertising in the socially conservative Christian lifestyle magazine, The Light Magazine. The magazine routinely hosts articles supporting conversion therapy, which attempts to "convert" individuals to a heterosexual orientation and treats same sex attraction as a mental illness. Throness was defiant, stating "he would advertise in the magazine again because it aligns with his values as a “Biblical Christian” and it’s an important way to reach his constituents."

In an online all-candidates meeting on October 14, 2020, prior to the 2020 British Columbia general election, Throness compared the NDP's plan for free birth control to eugenics, the discredited theory of selective mating for "desirable" traits. Throness was quoted as saying "And maybe they’ll have fewer babies so there will be fewer poor people in the future. And to me, that contains an odour that I don’t like and so I don’t really support what the NDP is doing there and that’s my answer.” Following his comments he was removed from the BC Liberal Party's candidate slate, but continued to campaign for reelection as an independent before being defeated by NDP candidate Kelli Paddon.

== Electoral record ==
2020 British Columbia general election: Chilliwack-Kent
| Party | Candidate | Votes | % | ±% | Expenditures |
|---|---|---|---|---|---|
| New Democratic | Kelli Paddon | 8,268 | 36.42 | +4.02 | $1,969.76 |
| Liberal | Laurie Throness | 6,964 | 30.68 | −22.07 | $31,151.35 |
| Independent | Jason Lum | 5,370 | 23.65 | – | $14,923.72 |
| Green | Jeff Hammersmark | 1,822 | 8.03 | −6.32 | $0.00 |
| Libertarian | Eli Gagné | 278 | 1.22 | – | $0.00 |
| Total valid votes | | 22,702 | 100.00 | – | |
| Total rejected ballots | | | | | |
| Turnout | | | | | |
| Registered voters | | | | | |
Source: Elections BC

2017 British Columbia general election: Chilliwack-Kent
| Party | Candidate | Votes | % | Expenditures |
|---|---|---|---|---|
| Liberal | Laurie Throness | 11,841 | 52.75 | $38,776 |
| New Democratic | Patti MacAhonic | 7,273 | 32.40 | $25,581 |
| Green | Josie Bleuer | 3,335 | 14.85 | $62 |
| Total valid votes | | 22,449 | 100.00 | |
| Total rejected ballots | | 145 | 0.64 | |
| Turnout | | 22,594 | 59.55 | |
Source: Elections BC

2013 British Columbia general election: Chilliwack-Hope
| Party | Candidate | Votes | % |
|---|---|---|---|
| Liberal | Laurie Throness | 10,053 | 49.15 |
| New Democratic | Gwen O'Mahony | 7,364 | 36.01 |
| Conservative | Michael Henshall | 2,202 | 10.77 |
| Independent | Ryan Ashley McKinnon | 833 | 4.07 |
| Total valid votes | | 20,452 | 100.00 |
| Total rejected ballots | | 117 | 0.57 |
| Turnout | | 20,569 | 57.38 |
Source: Elections BC
