= Chilliwack-Cultus Lake =

Provincial electoral district in British Columbia, Canada

British Columbia electoral district

Provincial electoral district
- Legislature: Legislative Assembly of British Columbia
MLA
Áʼa꞉líya Warbus
Conservative
- District created: 2023
- First contested: 2024
- Last contested: 2026

Demographics
- Population (2021): 53,148
- Area (km²): 1,113
- Pop. density (per km²): 47.8
- Census division: Fraser Valley Regional District
- Census subdivision(s): Chilliwack, Skowkale, Soowahlie, Tzeachten, Yakweakwioose

Chilliwack-Cultus Lake is a provincial electoral district for the Legislative Assembly of British Columbia.

It was created under the 2021 British Columbia electoral redistribution and was first contested in the 2024 British Columbia general election. The riding was formed from portions of Chilliwack and Chilliwack-Kent.

== Demographics ==
Population, 2021	53,148
Area (km^{2})	1,113
Pop. Density (people per km^{2})	48
Source: BC Electoral Boundaries Commission

== Geography ==
The district includes portions of the Fraser Valley Regional District south of the Trans-Canada Highway, encompassing the communities of Yarrow, Vedder Crossing and other rural areas of Chilliwack, as well as unincorporated areas to the south including Cultus Lake.

== Members of the Legislative Assembly ==
This riding has elected the following members of the Legislative Assembly:

Assembly	Years	Member	Party
Chilliwack-Cultus Lake; Riding created from Chilliwack and Chilliwack-Kent
43rd	2024–2026	Áʼa꞉líya Warbus	Conservative
43rd	2026–2026	Áʼa꞉líya Warbus	Independent
43rd	2026–2026 (Note: Rejoined the Conservatives after dissolution.)	Áʼa꞉líya Warbus	CentreBC
44th	2026–present	Áʼa꞉líya Warbus	Conservative

== Election results ==
2026 British Columbia general election
The 2026 general election will be held on October 24.
Party	Candidate	Votes	%	±%	Expenditures
Conservative	Áʼa꞉líya Warbus				
New Democratic	Kelli Paddon				
Total valid votes					
Total rejected ballots					
Turnout					
Registered voters					
Source: Elections BC

2024 British Columbia general election
Party	Candidate	Votes	%	±%	Expenditures
Conservative	Áʼa꞉líya Warbus	13,656	54.58	+51.8	$35,136.46
New Democratic	Kelli Paddon	11,366	45.42	+8.2	$37,560.31
Total valid votes/expense limit		25,022	99.67	–	$71,700.08
Total rejected ballots		83	0.33	–	
Turnout		25,105	60.37	–	
Registered voters		41,587			
Conservative notional gain from New Democratic		Swing		+21.8	
Source: Elections BC

2020 provincial election redistributed results
Party	%
New Democratic	37.2
Liberal	28.9
Others	22.7
Green	8.4
Conservative	2.8

== See also ==
- List of British Columbia provincial electoral districts
- Canadian provincial electoral districts
