= Dan Coulter =

Canadian politician (1975–2024)

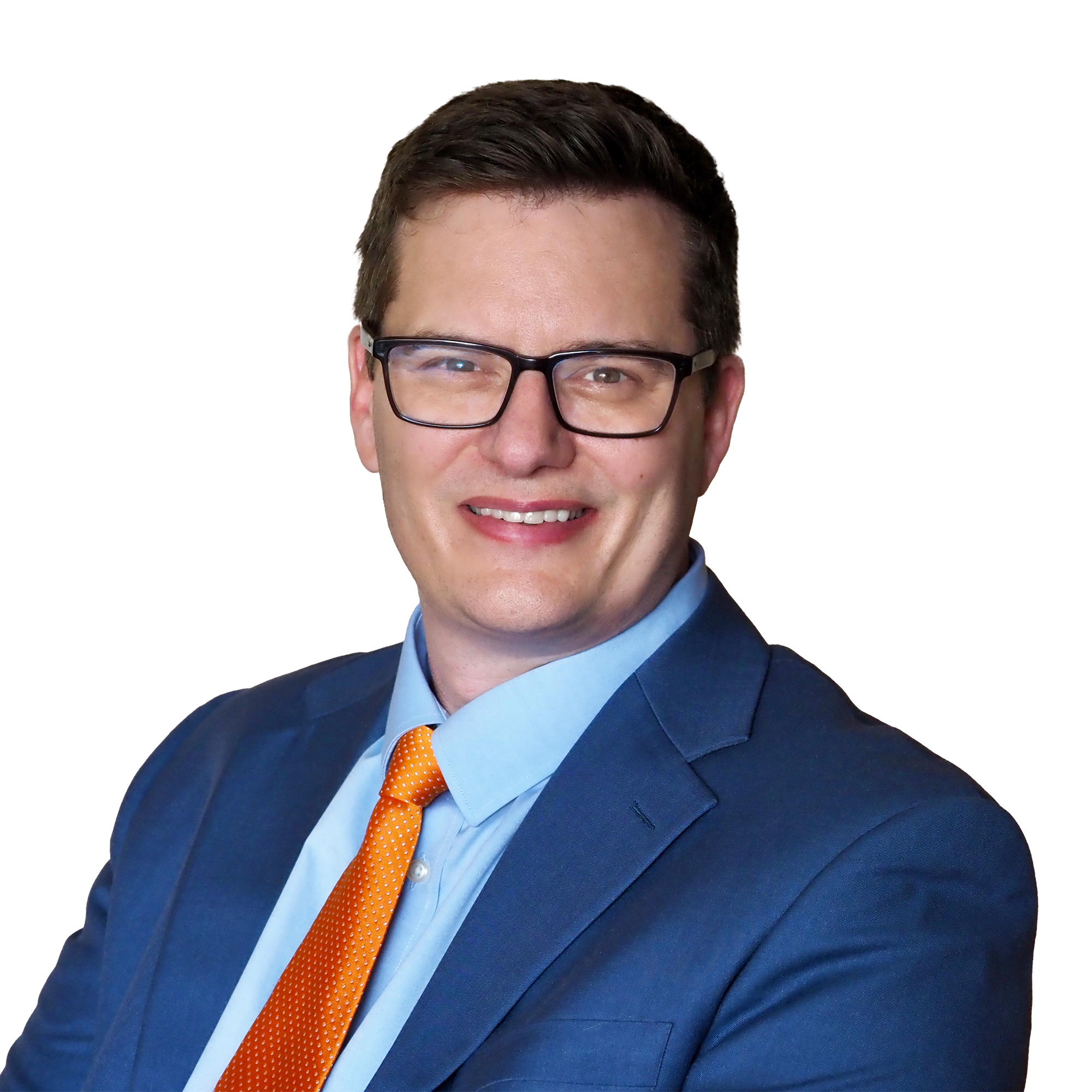
- Coulter in 2020

Minister of State for Infrastructure and Transit of British Columbia
- In office December 7, 2022 – November 18, 2024
- Premier: David Eby
- Preceded by: Bowinn Ma
- Succeeded by: Bowinn Ma (Infrastructure); Mike Farnworth (Transportation and Transit)

Parliamentary Secretary for Accessibility of British Columbia
- In office November 26, 2020 – December 7, 2022
- Premier: John Horgan; David Eby
- Preceded by: Position created
- Succeeded by: Susie Chant

Member of the British Columbia Legislative Assembly for Chilliwack
- In office October 24, 2020 – September 21, 2024
- Preceded by: John Martin
- Succeeded by: Heather Maahs

Personal details
- Born: February 23, 1975 Vancouver, British Columbia, Canada
- Died: December 12, 2024 (aged 49) Chilliwack, British Columbia, Canada
- Party: New Democratic

Daniel Alexander Coulter (February 23, 1975 – December 12, 2024) was a Canadian politician who was elected to the Legislative Assembly of British Columbia in the 2020 British Columbia general election. He represented the electoral district of Chilliwack as a member of the British Columbia New Democratic Party caucus. He defeated the two-term incumbent John Martin; prior to the 2020 election, Chilliwack was considered a stronghold for the then-BC Liberal Party.

In addition to serving as MLA for Chilliwack, Coulter was Minister of State for Infrastructure and Transit, working within the Ministry of Transportation and Infrastructure in the Eby ministry.

Coulter was previously Parliamentary Secretary for Accessibility under the Ministry of Social Development and Poverty Reduction in the Horgan ministry, where his mandate included consulting with advocates, communities and businesses to ensure that the new Accessible British Columbia Act would be effective and well understood and working with the Attorney General and Minister responsible for Housing to work on BC Building Code changes to make new buildings more accessible.

In the 2024 British Columbia general election, Coulter was defeated in his bid for re-election by Conservative candidate Heather Maahs. He was appointed the interim Provincial Director of the British Columbia New Democratic Party after the resignation of Heather Stoutenburg. He died weeks later at the age of 49.

== Background ==
Coulter was born on February 23, 1975, in Vancouver, British Columbia. He grew up in Edmonton and Abbotsford. After graduating from high school in 1993, he worked as a welder and then became a certified millwright with the Red Seal Program in 1999. Coulter was severely injured in a workplace accident in 1999 and was a wheelchair user. After his accident, he attended the University of the Fraser Valley.

In 2011, Coulter ran for school trustee in Chilliwack. He was unsuccessful, coming in 8th place and falling short of the 7th board seat by 384 votes. Coulter ran for school trustee again in the 2013 byelection and was successful. Coulter was re-elected in the 2014 general municipal election and received the third highest number of votes.

In October 2017, fellow Chilliwack school trustee Barry Neufeld made a Facebook post in which he called supporting transgender children in their gender identity child abuse, cited the American College of Pediatricians (an anti-LGBTQ organization) and said that he belonged "in a country like Russia, or Paraguay, which recently had the guts to stand up to these radical cultural nihilists." Coulter immediately took a stand for LGBTQ+ people and said, "I have friends that are Trans and I know students that are too. This hatred is aimed straight at who they are. It tries to make their existence illegitimate. It pisses me off! Our students and staff need to feel safe in our schools and a valued part of the school community—because they are!" In November 2017, Coulter called on Barry Neufeld to resign.

Coulter was reelected to the Chilliwack Board of education in 2018 with the highest number of votes. He served as board chair from November 2018 to November 2020. He resigned from the Chilliwack Board of Education on November 25, 2020, after being sworn in as MLA for Chilliwack.

== Death ==
Coulter was rushed to the Chilliwack General Hospital following an undisclosed medical emergency on December 6, 2024, where he later died on December 12. He was 49. The British Columbia New Democratic Party said in a statement that Coulter was a "devoted advocate" for the people of British Columbia.

== Electoral record ==
2024 British Columbia general election: Chilliwack North
Party	Candidate	Votes	%	±%	Expenditures
Conservative	Heather Maahs	11,776	54.58	+39.7	$36,179.76
New Democratic	Dan Coulter	8,125	37.66	−1.9	$50,357.69
Green	Tim Cooper	1,187	5.50	−4.6	$0.00
Independent	Dan Grice	487	2.26	–	$3,469.73
Total valid votes/expense limit		21,575	99.88	–	$71,700.08
Total rejected ballots		26	0.12	–	
Turnout		21,601	55.07	–	
Registered voters		39,227			
Conservative notional gain from New Democratic		Swing		+20.8	
Source: Elections BC

2020 British Columbia general election: Chilliwack
Party	Candidate	Votes	%	±%	Expenditures
New Democratic	Dan Coulter	7,349	41.56	+9.18	$5,919.34
Liberal	John Martin	5,102	28.85	−19.57	$36,378.86
Conservative	Diane Janzen	2,910	16.46	–	$20,583.54
Green	Tim Cooper	1,888	10.68	−6.42	$2,161.84
Independent	Josue Anderson	257	1.45	–	$2,965.16
Libertarian	Andrew Coombes	177	1.00	–	$0.00
Total valid votes		17,683	100.00	–	
Total rejected ballots		216	1.21		
Turnout		17,899	47.04		
Registered voters		38,054			
New Democratic gain from Liberal		Swing		+14.38	
Source: Elections BC
