= Gwen O'Mahony =

Canadian politician (born 1972)

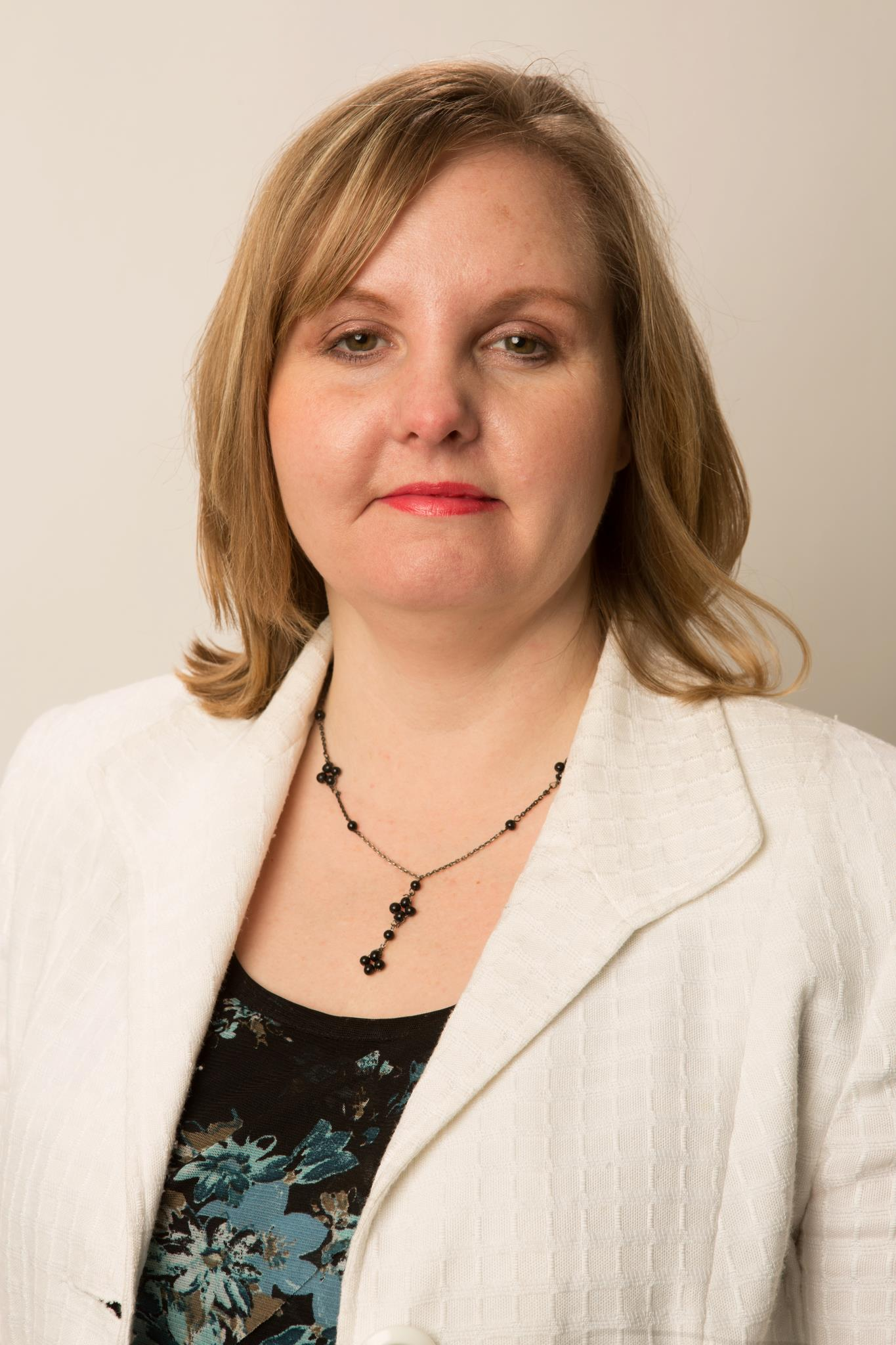

MLA for Chilliwack-Hope
- In office April 19, 2012 – April 16, 2013
- Preceded by: Barry Penner
- Succeeded by: Laurie Throness

Personal details
- Born: November 2, 1971 (age 55) Campbell River, British Columbia
- Party: BC Conservative (2023—present)
- Other political affiliations: New Democratic Party (until 2023)
- Education: Master of Business Administration, Master of Science (International Management), Bachelor of Science (General Studies)
- Alma mater: Vancouver Island University; University of Hertfordshire; University of the Fraser Valley
- Occupation: Business Owner - O'Mahony Consulting

Gwen O'Mahony (born November 2, 1972) is a Canadian politician, who represented Chilliwack-Hope in the Legislative Assembly of British Columbia from April 2012 until April 2013 as a member of the British Columbia New Democratic Party, and is now a member of the Conservative Party of British Columbia.

She was the first New Democratic Party candidate and the first woman to win the riding of Chilliwack-Hope.

O'Mahony was previously the party's candidate in Chilliwack-Hope in the 2009 provincial election, as well as running federally for the New Democrats in Chilliwack—Fraser Canyon in the 2011 federal election. In the 2013 provincial election, O'Mahony was defeated by BC Liberal Party candidate Laurie Throness, the same Liberal candidate she had faced in the 2012 by-election. In 2021, O'Mahony unsuccessfully sought the federal NDP nomination for Nanaimo—Ladysmith.

On April 3, 2024, O'Mahony was unveiled as the BC Conservative candidate for Nanaimo-Lantzville in the 2024 British Columbia general election. O'Mahony would go on to lose the election to George Anderson of the BC NDP.

== Electoral record ==
2024 British Columbia general election: Nanaimo-Lantzville
Party	Candidate	Votes	%	±%	Expenditures
New Democratic	George Anderson	15,307	51.75	+3.7	$63,351.11
Conservative	Gwen O'Mahony	11,687	39.51	+37.4	$27,508.78
Green	Lia Versaevel	2,586	8.74	-11.3	$4,373.36
Total valid votes/expense limit		29,580	99.86	–	$71,700.08
Total rejected ballots		40	0.14	–	
Turnout		29,620	66.00	–	
Registered voters		44,879			
New Democratic notional hold		Swing		-16.8	
Source: Elections BC

2013 British Columbia general election: Chilliwack-Hope
Party	Candidate	Votes	%
Liberal	Laurie Throness	10,053	49.15
New Democratic	Gwen O'Mahony	7,364	36.01
Conservative	Michael Henshall	2,202	10.77
Independent	Ryan Ashley McKinnon	833	4.07
Total valid votes		20,452	100.00
Total rejected ballots		117	0.57
Turnout		20,569	57.38
Source: Elections BC

British Columbia provincial by-election, April 19, 2012: Chilliwack-Hope
Party	Candidate	Votes	%	±%
New Democratic	Gwen O'Mahony	6,022	41.89	+8
Liberal	Laurie Throness	4,593	31.95	-22
Conservative	John Martin	3,615	25.15	+18
Libertarian	Lewis Dahlby	145	1.01	
Total valid votes		14,375		
Total rejected ballots		26		
Turnout		14,401	41.12	
"Report of the Chief Electoral Officer on the Port Moody-Coquitlam and Chilliwack-Hope By-elections" (PDF). Elections B.C.

2011 Canadian federal election: Chilliwack—Fraser Canyon
Party	Candidate	Votes	%	±%	Expenditures
Conservative	Mark Strahl	28,160	57.20	–5.12	$85,783.33
New Democratic	Gwen O'Mahony	12,691	25.78	+7.02	$24,136.83
Liberal	Diane Janzen	5,320	10.81	+2.29	$64,386.66
Green	Jamie Hoskins	2,706	5.50	–3.27	$1,351.18
Western Block	Clive Edwards	180	0.37	–	none listed
Marxist–Leninist	Dorothy-Jean O'Donnell	173	0.35	+0.11	none listed
Total valid votes/expense limit		49,230	99.69	–	$101,975.64
Total rejected ballots		152	0.31	+0.03	
Turnout		49,382	58.14	+0.62	
Eligible voters		84,930			
Conservative hold		Swing		–6.07	
Source: Elections Canada

2009 British Columbia general election: Chilliwack-Hope
Party	Candidate	Votes	%	Expenditures
Liberal	Barry Penner	8,985	53.28	$67,073
New Democratic	Gwen O'Mahony	5,638	33.43	$18,541
Conservative	Hans Mulder	1,198	7.10	$250
Green	Guy Durnin	951	5.64	$350
People's Front	Dorothy-Jean O'Donnell	93	0.55	$260
Total valid votes		16,865		
Total rejected ballots		95	0.56	
Turnout		16,960	51.85	
"Chilliwack-Hope B.C. Votes". CBC.ca.
