= Sharon Gaetz =

Former mayor of Chilliwack

Sharon Lee Gaetz
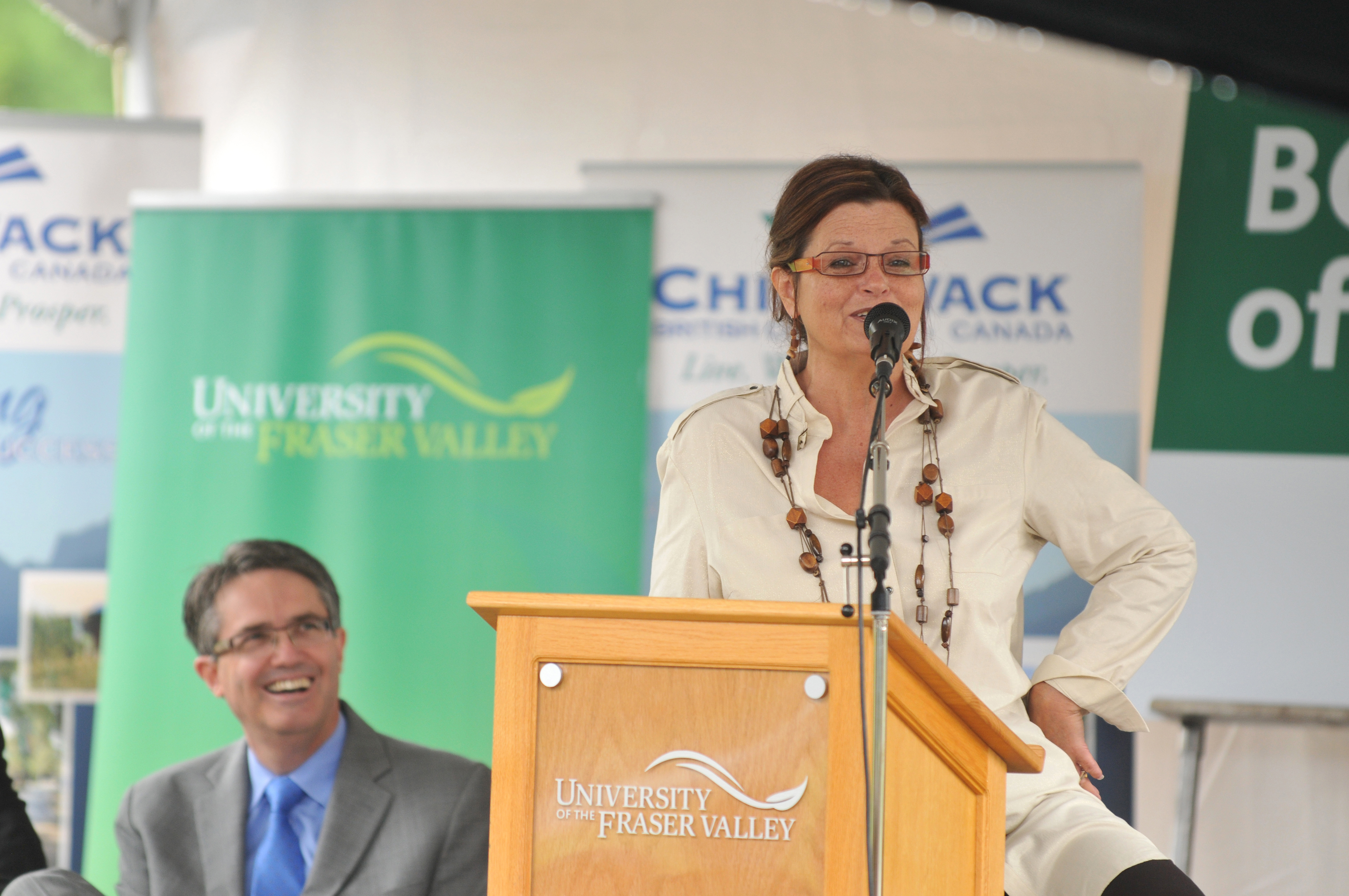
- Sharon Gaetz speaking at the University of the Fraser Valley in 2013

Mayor of Chilliwack
- In office December 1, 2008 – November 6, 2018
- Preceded by: Clint Hames
- Succeeded by: Ken Popove

City Councillor
- In office 1996–2008

Personal details
- Born: North Vancouver
- Spouse: James Francis Gaetz
- Children: 2
- Occupation: Politician; Pastor

Sharon L. Gaetz is a Canadian former politician who servered as the mayor of the City of Chilliwack, British Columbia, Canada. She was first elected to that office in the 2008 election and served three consecutive terms. In 2018, she lost to incumbent city councillor Ken Popove whilst seeking a fourth term. She remains the only woman in the city's history elected to the office of mayor. She previously served twelve years as a city councillor, during which time she served as acting mayor. Mayor Gaetz also served as director of the Fraser Valley Regional District. She was not affiliated with any political party whilst in public office. She described herself as a “fiscal conservative with a strong social conscience” politically.

In 2007, then-Councillor Gaetz presented information about cannabis cultivation to Chilliwack's social issues advisory committee. Also that year, she supported the densification of the city through the construction of an apartment building containing 71 units.

== Personal life ==
Gaetz was born in North Vancouver and grew up in Chilliwack. She and her husband, Jim, have a son, and two grandchildren. Their daughter, Jenna, died in 2002 at 21 years old. Gaetz was the Head Pastor at the Southside Church in Chilliwack. She is an Honorary Colonel in the 39 Combat Engineer Regiment.
