= Chilliwack-Kent =

Defunct provincial electoral district in British Columbia, Canada

Coordinates: 49.120°N 121.946°W

British Columbia electoral district
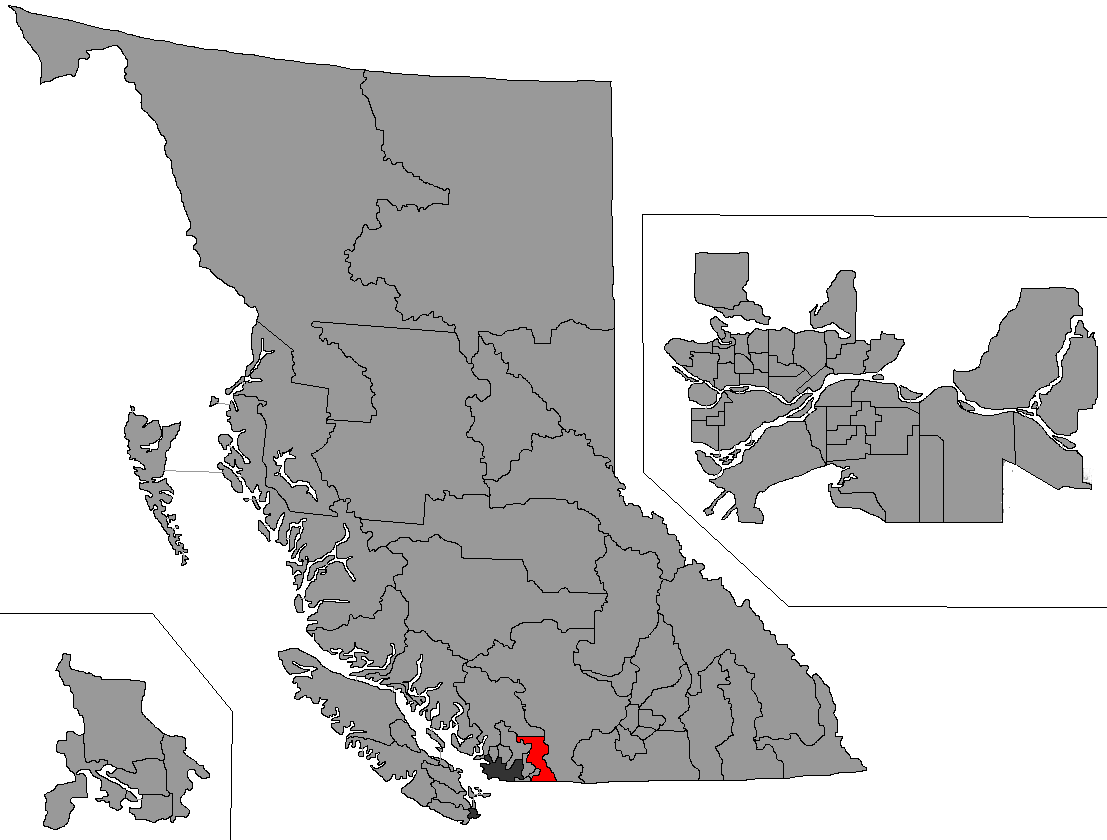

Provincial electoral district
- Legislature: Legislative Assembly of British Columbia
- District created: 2015
- District abolished: 2024
- First contested: 2017
- Last contested: 2020

Chilliwack-Kent was a provincial electoral district for the Legislative Assembly of British Columbia, Canada, that existed from 2001 to 2009 and again from 2017 to 2024.

Between 2009 and 2017, it was replaced by the Chilliwack-Hope riding. In the 2015 redistribution, the eastern portion of Chilliwack-Hope was adjusted and the name Chilliwack-Kent was brought back into service and was contested in the 2017 general election. Under the 2021 British Columbia electoral redistribution that took effect for the 2024 general election, riding was eliminated: Kent and other communities north of the Fraser River were redistributed to Fraser-Nicola, lands between the Fraser and Trans-Canada Highway were redistributed to Chilliwack North, and the remaining southern portion of the riding formed the new electoral district of Chilliwack-Cultus Lake.

== Demographics ==
| Population, 2014 | 51,021 |
| Area (km^{2}) | 3,168 |

== History ==
| Assembly | Years | Member | Party |
|---|---|---|---|
Chilliwack-Kent; Riding created from Abbotsford and Chilliwack
| 37th | 2001–2005 | Barry Penner | Liberal |
| 38th | 2005–2009 | Barry Penner | Liberal |
Riding dissolved into Chilliwack-Hope
Riding re-created from Chilliwack-Hope
| 41st | 2017–2020 | Laurie Throness | Liberal |
| 42nd | 2020–2024 | Kelli Paddon | New Democratic |
Riding dissolved into Chilliwack-Cultus Lake, Chilliwack North and Fraser-Nicola

== Members of the Legislative Assembly ==
The last election for this riding was in 2020 and its member of the Legislative Assembly (MLA) was Kelli Paddon. She replaced Laurie Throness who was first elected to represent the Chilliwack-Hope riding in 2013. From 2001 to 2009, Chilliwack-Kent was represented by Barry Penner.

== Election results ==
2020 British Columbia general election
| Party | Candidate | Votes | % | ±% | Expenditures |
|---|---|---|---|---|---|
| New Democratic | Kelli Paddon | 8,268 | 36.42 | +4.02 | $1,969.76 |
| Liberal | Laurie Throness | 6,964 | 30.68 | −22.07 | $31,151.35 |
| Independent | Jason Lum | 5,370 | 23.65 | – | $14,923.72 |
| Green | Jeff Hammersmark | 1,822 | 8.03 | −6.32 | $0.00 |
| Libertarian | Eli Gagné | 278 | 1.22 | – | $0.00 |
| Total valid votes | | 22,702 | 100.00 | – | |
| Total rejected ballots | | | | | |
| Turnout | | | | | |
| Registered voters | | | | | |
Source: Elections BC

2017 British Columbia general election
| Party | Candidate | Votes | % | Expenditures |
|---|---|---|---|---|
| Liberal | Laurie Throness | 11,841 | 52.75 | $38,776 |
| New Democratic | Patti MacAhonic | 7,273 | 32.40 | $25,581 |
| Green | Josie Bleuer | 3,335 | 14.85 | $62 |
| Total valid votes | | 22,449 | 100.00 | |
| Total rejected ballots | | 145 | 0.64 | |
| Turnout | | 22,594 | 59.55 | |
Source: Elections BC

=== 2009–2017, Riding dissolved into Chilliwack-Hope ===
2005 British Columbia general election
| Party | Candidate | Votes | % | Expenditures |
|---|---|---|---|---|
| Liberal | Barry Penner | 11,368 | 57.14 | $77,840 |
| New Democratic | Malcolm James | 6,534 | 32.84 | $16,280 |
| Green | Hans Mulder | 1,651 | 8.30 | $1,742 |
| Moderates | David Michael Anderson | 240 | 1.21 | $120 |
| Youth Coalition | Colin Wormworth | 103 | 0.52 | $100 |
| Total valid votes | | 19,896 | 100 | |
| Total rejected ballots | | 118 | 0.59 | |
| Turnout | | 20,014 | 58.71 | |

B.C. General Election 2001: Chilliwack-Kent
| Party | Candidate | Votes | % | ± | Expenditures |
|---|---|---|---|---|---|
| Liberal | Barry Penner | 13,814 | 74.88% | | $40,938 |
| NDP | Malcolm James | 2,155 | 11.68% | | $3,979 |
| Green | Larry Commodore | 1,511 | 8.19% | – | $890 |
| Marijuana | David Ferguson | 968 | 5.25% | | $1,496 |
| Total valid votes | | 18,448 | 100.00% | | |
| Total rejected ballots | | 94 | 0.51% | | |
| Turnout | | 18,542 | 71.63% | | |

== See also ==
- List of British Columbia provincial electoral districts
- Canadian provincial electoral districts
