= Kelli Paddon =

Canadian politician

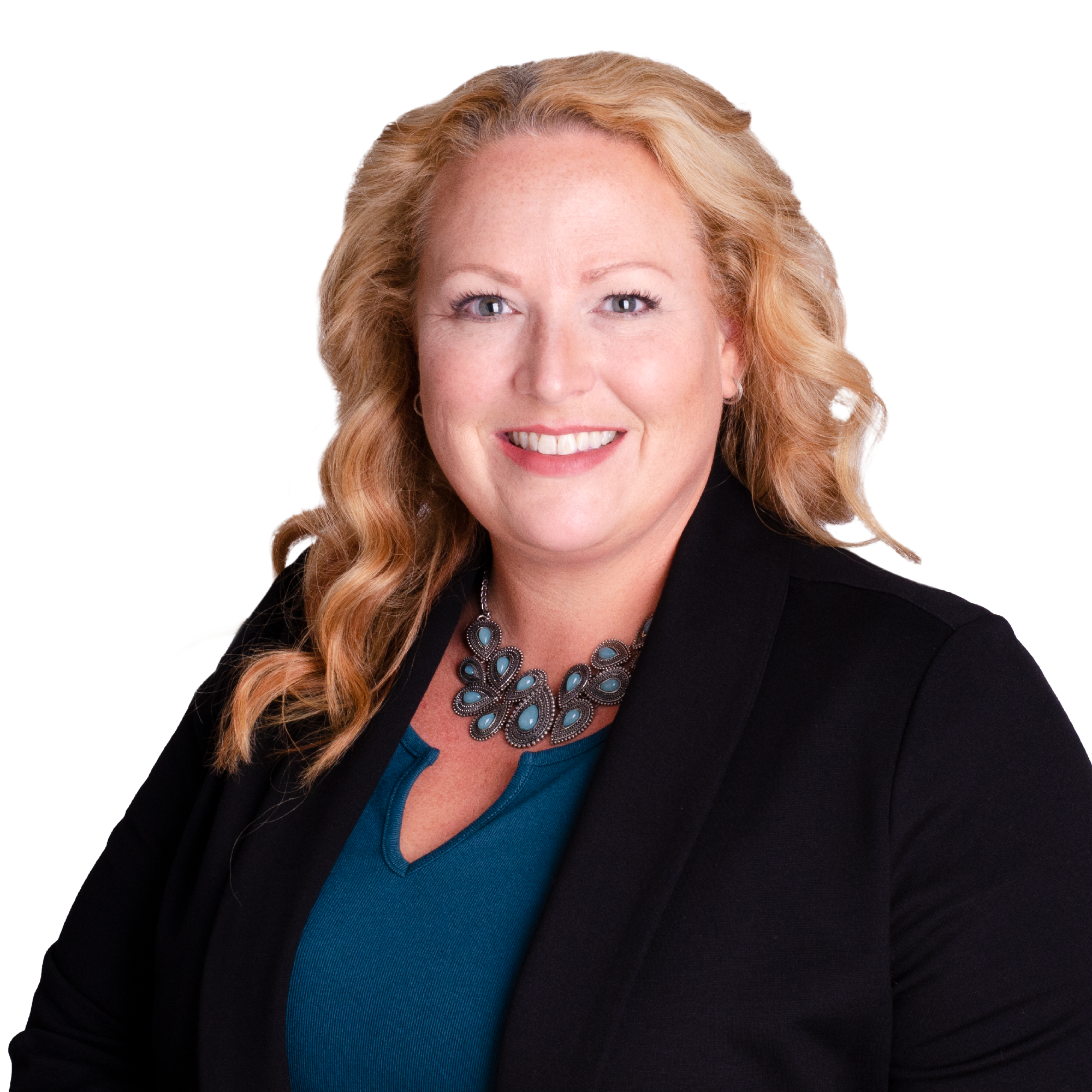
- Paddon in 2020

Parliamentary Secretary for Gender Equity of British Columbia
- In office December 7, 2022 – November 18, 2024
- Premier: David Eby
- Preceded by: Grace Lore
- Succeeded by: Jennifer Blatherwick

Member of the British Columbia Legislative Assembly for Chilliwack-Kent
- In office October 24, 2020 – September 21, 2024
- Preceded by: Laurie Throness
- Succeeded by: Áʼa꞉líya Warbus

Personal details
- Party: New Democratic

Kelli Paddon is a Canadian politician who was elected to the Legislative Assembly of British Columbia in the 2020 British Columbia general election. She represented the electoral district of Chilliwack-Kent as a member of the British Columbia New Democratic Party. On December 7, 2022, she was appointed the Parliamentary Secretary for Gender Equity. She lost re-election in the 2024 British Columbia general election to Conservative Áʼa꞉líya Warbus.

== Electoral record ==
2024 British Columbia general election: Chilliwack-Cultus Lake
| Party | Candidate | Votes | % | ±% | Expenditures |
|---|---|---|---|---|---|
| Conservative | Áʼa꞉líya Warbus | 13,656 | 54.58 | +51.8 | $35,136.46 |
| New Democratic | Kelli Paddon | 11,366 | 45.42 | +8.2 | $37,560.31 |
| Total valid votes/expense limit | | 25,022 | 99.67 | – | $71,700.08 |
| Total rejected ballots | | 83 | 0.33 | – | |
| Turnout | | 25,105 | 60.37 | – | |
| Registered voters | | 41,587 | | | |
| Conservative notional gain from New Democratic | | Swing | | +21.8 | |
Source: Elections BC

2020 British Columbia general election: Chilliwack-Kent
| Party | Candidate | Votes | % | ±% | Expenditures |
|---|---|---|---|---|---|
| New Democratic | Kelli Paddon | 8,268 | 36.42 | +4.02 | $1,969.76 |
| Liberal | Laurie Throness | 6,964 | 30.68 | −22.07 | $31,151.35 |
| Independent | Jason Lum | 5,370 | 23.65 | – | $14,923.72 |
| Green | Jeff Hammersmark | 1,822 | 8.03 | −6.32 | $0.00 |
| Libertarian | Eli Gagné | 278 | 1.22 | – | $0.00 |
| Total valid votes | | 22,702 | 100.00 | – | |
| Total rejected ballots | | | | | |
| Turnout | | | | | |
| Registered voters | | | | | |
Source: Elections BC
