= John Les =

Canadian politician

Member of the British Columbia Legislative Assembly for Chilliwack Chilliwack-Sumas (2001-2009)
- In office May 16, 2001 – May 14, 2013
- Preceded by: Riding established
- Succeeded by: John Martin

Minister of Public Safety and Solicitor General of British Columbia
- In office June 16, 2005 – April 1, 2008
- Premier: Gordon Campbell
- Preceded by: Rich Coleman
- Succeeded by: John van Dongen

Minister of Small Business and Economic Development of British Columbia
- In office January 26, 2004 – June 16, 2005
- Premier: Gordon Campbell
- Preceded by: Position established
- Succeeded by: Colin Hansen (Economic Development); Rick Thorpe (Small Business)

Mayor of Chilliwack, British Columbia
- In office 1987–1999
- Preceded by: John Jansen
- Succeeded by: Clint Hames

Personal details
- Born: 1952 (age 73–74) Chilliwack, British Columbia
- Party: BC Liberal
- Other political affiliations: Liberal Party of Canada
- Spouse: Mattie Les (m. 1973)

John Les (born 1952) is a Canadian politician and former member of the Legislative Assembly (MLA) for British Columbia, representing Chilliwack-Sumas from 2001 to 2009, and Chilliwack from 2009 to 2013. A caucus member of the British Columbia Liberal Party, he served in the cabinet of Premier Gordon Campbell as Minister of Small Business and Economic Development from 2004 to 2005, and Minister of Public Safety and Solicitor General from 2005 to 2008. Prior to entering provincial politics, he was a municipal councillor and mayor of Chilliwack.

== Biography ==
Born in Chilliwack, Les was a partner in a local dairy, a real estate agent and the owner of a land development company. He served as a municipal councillor in Chilliwack from 1984 to 1987. With John Jansen resigning as mayor of Chilliwack following his election as MLA in 1986, Les won the 1987 mayoral by-election, and served as mayor until 1999. He ran for the Liberal Party of Canada in the 1997 federal election in the riding of Fraser Valley, but lost to Reform candidate Chuck Strahl.

He was elected MLA in the 2001 provincial election representing the British Columbia Liberal Party in the newly established riding of Chilliwack-Sumas. He was appointed to the cabinet by Premier Gordon Campbell in January 2004 to serve as Minister of Small Business and Economic Development. Following his re-election in 2005, he was named Minister of Public Safety and Solicitor General.

On March 28, 2008, Les resigned from his cabinet post pending the outcome of an investigation over allegations arising from his tenure as mayor of Chilliwack; his appointment was officially rescinded by order-in-council on April 1. A special prosecutor was appointed to look into a land deal that he was alleged to have benefited from. The investigation concluded in June 2010, with the special prosecutor stating there was no evidence to suggest that he used his public office to advance his personal interest.

He was re-elected in the newly re-created Chilliwack riding in the 2009 election. Ahead of the 2011 British Columbia sales tax referendum, Les was appointed as Parliamentary Secretary for Harmonized Sales Tax information in October 2010. After Christy Clark took over as premier in March 2011, Les was named Parliamentary Secretary to the Premier, and became a member of the Treasury Board and the Policies and Priorities Committee.

During his time as MLA, he had chaired the Government Caucus, the Legislative Special Committee on the Citizens' Assembly on Electoral Reform and the Select Standing Committee on Aboriginal Affairs. He was also a member of the Government Caucus Committee on Economy and Government Operations, the Select Standing Committee on Crown Corporations and the Select Standing Committee on Parliamentary Reform, Ethical Conduct, Standing Orders and Private Bills.

On August 30, 2012, Les announced that he would not seek re-election as MLA for Chilliwack in the 2013 general election. In March 2014 the BC government announced the appointment of Les to lead a consultation on seismic preparedness, with an annual compensation of $140,000; the appointment was withdrawn shortly thereafter.

He and his wife Mattie have been married since 1973; they have six children together.

== Election results (partial) ==
=== Federal ===
1997 Canadian federal election: Fraser Valley
Party	Candidate	Votes	%	Expenditures
Reform	Chuck Strahl	33,101	62.85	$57,306
Liberal	John Les	11,569	21.96	$63,061
New Democratic	Rob Lees	4,680	8.88	$21,339
Progressive Conservative	Harry Wiens	1,714	3.25	$6,999
Christian Heritage	Rodger N. Brown	1,047	1.98	$23,870
Green	Carol Battaglio	342	0.64	
Natural Law	Patrick Boylan	118	0.22	$5
Independent	Sa Tan	95	0.18	
Total valid votes		52,666	100.0	
Total rejected ballots		182	0.34	
Turnout		52,848	67.02	
This riding was re-created from Fraser Valley East and Fraser Valley West, both of which elected a Reform Party candidate. Chuck Strahl was the incumbent from Fraser Valley East.

=== Provincial ===
2005 British Columbia general election: Chilliwack-Sumas
Party	Candidate	Votes	%
Liberal	John Les	11,995	57.36
New Democratic	John-Henry Harter	6,477	30.97
Green	Norm Siefken	1,731	8.28
Democratic Reform	Brian Downey	315	1.51
Youth Coalition	Augustine Lee	266	1.27
Moderates	Adam James Solheim	127	0.61
Total		20,911	100.00
