= Ken Popove =

Canadian politician

His Worship Ken Popove

Mayor of Chilliwack
- In office November 6, 2018 – November 3, 2026
- Preceded by: Sharon Gaetz
- Succeeded by: Jason Lum

Personal details
- Born: Kenneth Robin Popove
- Spouse(s): Gail; Tracey (previous)
- Children: 3 (including two step-children)
- Profession: Businessman

Kenneth Robin Popove is a Canadian politician. He has served as the mayor of Chilliwack, British Columbia, since 2018.

== Early life and career ==
Popove is the son of Joe and Vi Popove. He moved to Chilliwack at the age of 12 from Mission, British Columbia, and graduated from Chilliwack Senior Secondary School in 1978. In the early 1980s he started a bus charter company which made ski trips to Mount Baker. He also bought a houseboat and ran charters on Cultus Lake. In 1987, he raised money to build the Cultus Lake Kids Park and started the Cultus Lake Beach Party. He would later start "Bongo Boy Productions" which put on events in the city.

After about 20 years in the tire business, Popove opened his own business in 1994, called "Ken's Tire & Wheel" located in the city's downtown. In 2000, he joined the DT Chilliwack Business Improvement Association and spent six years as president. In total, he spent 11 years as a member.

== City council ==
Popove was first elected to Chilliwack City Council in 2011, winning 4,876 votes and finishing second on the six seat council. He was re-elected in 2014, winning 7,584 votes and placing third. As a councillor, he was the chair of a housing task force and the Chilliwack Healthier Community network. He also co-chaired the 2018 Royal Bank Cup committee.

== Mayoral run ==
In May 2018, Popove announced he was running for mayor of Chilliack in that year's municipal elections. In the election, he defeated incumbent Sharon Gaetz and fellow councillor Sam Waddington in a three-way race. Popove was endorsed in his bid by former mayor Clint Hames. The election was marred in controversy over council expense claims made by Waddington. Gaetz attempted to capitalize on the controversy but was accused of doing so for political gain. Popove avoided the controversy entirely. He ran on a campaign of "getting things done in collaboration", "great community services, low taxes, and an unbeatable quality of life". Upon his election he "vowed to work closer with area First Nations, as well as provincial and federal governments".

== Mayoralty ==
In his first year as mayor, Popove took issue with the Fraser Health Authority after it discharged patients with mobility issues from a hospital in Surrey to homeless shelters in Chilliwack. Later that year, he opposed a plan to install a rainbow sidewalk fearing "the precedent [it] would ... set" after initially supporting the plan.

In 2020, Popove supported a pilot project to allow for people to consume alcohol in two parks in the city.

In his first term, he had to deal with the "[COVID] pandemic, [forest] fires, heat domes, atmospheric rivers and flooding". He claimed "road upgrades, new parks", low income housing, "fostering relationships with Indigenous [people], and addressing the opiate crisis" as his accomplishments during the term. The city also saw the construction of the largest pump track in North America.

Popove was re-elected as mayor in the 2022 mayoral election, defeating his only opponent, Ian Carmichael, by nearly 8,000 votes, securing nearly three-quarters of the vote in the process.

During his tenure, Popove has seen Chilliwack grow rapidly as a city, as residents of the Lower Mainland have moved into the city seeking a "quieter, more affordable life", thanks to a high cost of living and unaffordable housing in the Vancouver area. This growth has caused pressure in the city, with increasing property taxes, more traffic and pressure on land for housing. Popove has opposed the province's housing densification plans which involve not permitting local public hearings on residential development rezoning.

Popove and Victoria mayor Marianne Alto serve as the co-chairs of the BC Urban Mayors Caucus. In 2024, the two penned their opposition to the Supreme Court of British Columbia's decision to pause the Restricting Public Consumption of Illegal Substances Act, fearing their inability to regulate public drug use.
