= Dorothy Kostrzewa =

Canadian politician

- Born: Dorothy Chung; August 17, 1928; Chilliwack, British Columbia, Canada
- Died: January 11, 2013 (aged 84); Royal Columbian Hospital, New Westminster, British Columbia
- Occupation: Politician
- Spouse: Richard Kostrzewa
- Children: 2
- Awards: Queen Elizabeth II Diamond Jubilee Medal (2013)

Dorothy Nan Kostrzewa (née Chung; August 17, 1928 – January 11, 2013) was a Canadian politician. She is the first Chinese-Canadian woman to hold political office in Canada when she was elected to Chilliwack City Council in 1970. She served on city council for 33 years making her the longest serving city councillor in British Columbia.

== Early life ==
Dorothy Kostrzewa was born the youngest of eight children fathered by Chinese immigrant, Dr. Chung Bing Kee in Chilliwack's Chinatown neighbourhood. Her parents died, leaving the children watched over by family and friends. Kostrzewa was mainly raised by her second-oldest brother, Wally. She studied accounting at the Duffus School of Commerce in Vancouver, and worked as an accountant at Chilliwack General Hospital from 1949 until 1969.

Kostrzewa had high scores in bowling in Chilliwack. She also taught tennis and played badminton.

== Political career ==
She was first elected to Chilliwack City Council in 1970 making her the first Chinese-Canadian to hold political office in Canada and the first woman elected to Chilliwack township council. Her successful run for office in 1970 was considered an "exceedingly strong showing" by The Chilliwack Progress. In 1972, she served on the finance committee and the Civic Properties and Recreation Commission as chair. In 1973, she was chair of the Centennial committee. She retired from politics in 2008.

== Honours ==
She earned the Order of Chilliwack and awarded an honorary Doctor of Laws from University of the Fraser Valley in 2009 for outstanding community service. She was named the Woman of the Year in 2000, and millennium woman of the year. She was named Sportsman of the Year. She was named a Paul Harris Fellow by the Chilliwack Rotary Club, and one of Chilliwack’s Community Sports Heroes. Kostrzewa was named one of the "100 Chinese Canadians making a difference in British Columbia" in 2006. In 2013, she was posthumously awarded the Queen Elizabeth II Diamond Jubilee Medal, "for her long service to Chilliwack and her groundbreaking contribution to women in politics". In 2017, she was featured in a traveling exhibition, Gold Mountain Dream! Bravely Venture into the Fraser Valley, created by the Royal BC Museum.
