= Chilliwack City Council =

Governing body of Chilliwack, British Columbia, Canada

Type
- Type: Unicameral

Leadership
- Mayor: Jason Lum since 2026
- Councillors: Chris Kloot; Kevin Baarda; Nicole Huitema-Read; Steve Czeck; Sue Attrill-Knott; Trevor McDonald

Structure
- Seats: 6 councillors and mayor
- Committees: Accessibility and Inclusion; Affordable Housing & Development; Agricultural & Rural; Chilliwack Parks and Trails; Community Safety Governance; Design Review; Heritage; Public Art; Public Safety; Transportation

Elections
- Voting system: Plurality at-large voting
- Last election: 17 October 2026

Meeting place
- Council Chambers; Chilliwack City Hall; Chilliwack, British Columbia

Website
- chilliwack.ca

Chilliwack City Council is the governing body for the City of Chilliwack, British Columbia. Its powers and responsibilities are regulated through the Local Government Act, and the Community Charter. It has the power of a natural person, the power to expropriate, and the power to establish and enforce bylaws. It raises funds through property taxes and user fees, and can borrow a limited amount through the Municipal Finance Authority of British Columbia to pay for capital costs.

== Membership ==
The council consists of the mayor plus 6 councillors elected at-large every 4 years on the third Saturday in October. The most recent election took place on 17 October 2026.

Jason Lum	Mayor
Chris Kloot	Councillor
Kevin Baarda	Councillor
Nicole Huitema-Read	Councillor
Steve Czeck	Councillor
Sue Attrill-Knott	Councillor
Trevor McDonald	Councillor

== Committees ==
Advisory Committees are composed of two Council members to act as Chair and Vice Chair, community representatives appointed by Council, and City staff.

=== Accessibility and Inclusion Advisory Committee ===
The AIAC identifies accessibility barriers for individuals using city resources, including parks and civic facilities, and advises Council on how to remove and prevent those barriers.

=== Affordable Housing & Development Advisory Committee ===
The AHDC advises Council on the implementation of the City’s Affordable Housing Strategy and other policies and strategies to address housing needs in the community.

=== Agricultural & Rural Advisory Committee ===
The ARAC is a Select Committee established by Council to serve as an advisory/liaison body between Council and the rural neighbourhoods in Chilliwack. The committee looks at policy issues with respect to service delivery in rural areas and also provides advice to Council on matters relating to agriculture, agri-business and agri-tourism.

=== Chilliwack Parks and Trails Advisory Committee ===
The CPTAC serves as an advisory/liaison body between Council and park/ trail users within the City.

=== Community Safety Governance Committee ===
The purpose of the CSGC is to support interagency collaboration and promote systemic change to improve community safety, through implementation of actions identified in the Chilliwack Community Safety Plan.

=== Design Review Advisory Committee ===
The DRAC is a Select Committee established to advise Council on design related issues.

=== Heritage Advisory Committee ===
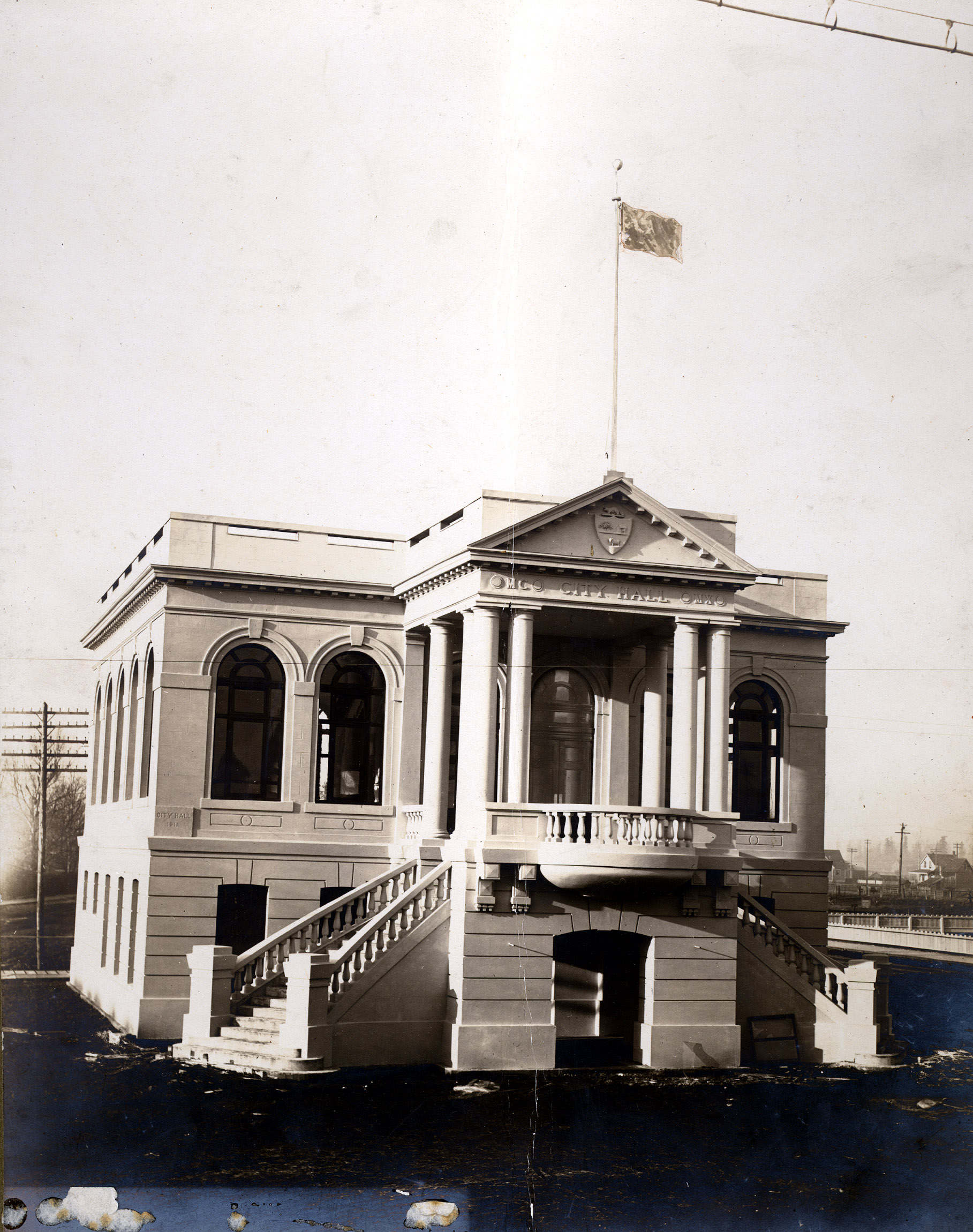
Chilliwack City Hall National Historic Site

The HAC advises Council on the implementation of the Heritage Strategic Action Plan and other related topics.

=== Public Art Advisory Committee ===
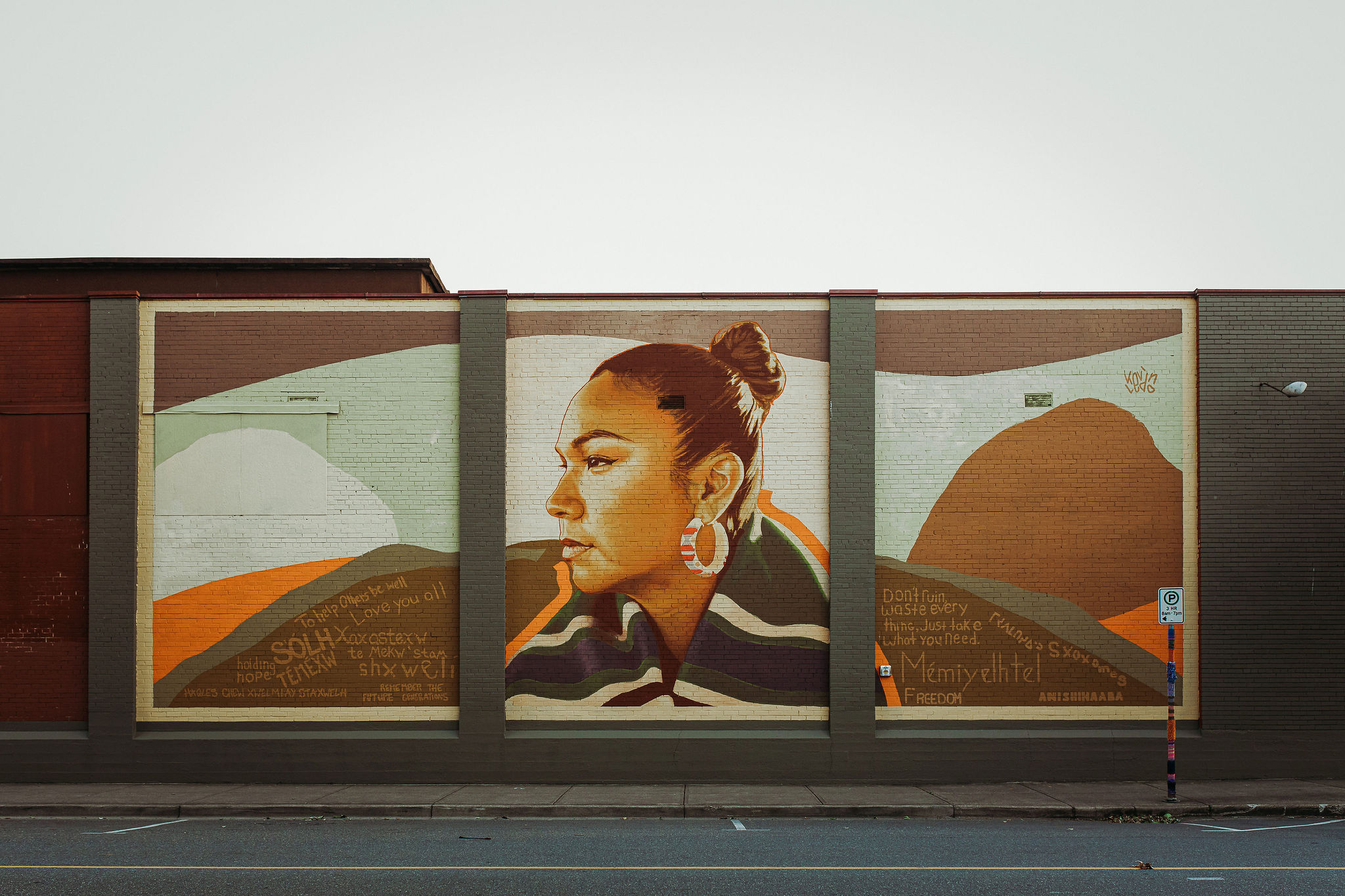
Use Your Voice, Kevin Ledo 2020 for Chilliwack Mural Festival

The PAAC is a Select Committee established by Council as an advisory/liaison body between Council and the arts community. The committee advises Council on the integration of public art throughout the City.

=== Public Safety Advisory Committee ===
The PSAC is a Select Committee focusing on current and emerging public safety issues. The committee addresses bylaw matters, fire regulations, safety issues, and proceeds from crime. The committee consists of 15 voting members appointed by Council, plus two elected officials representing Council as Chair and Vice Chair.

=== Transportation Advisory Committee ===
The TAC is a Select Committee established as an advisory/liaison body between Council and the public. The Committee advises on issues relating to transportation, traffic management and transit.

== History ==
On 26 April 1873, the "Corporation of the Township of Chilliwhack" (note the variant spelling) became one of the first municipalities incorporated by the Province of British Columbia. The first Township Council meeting took place on in the Sumas schoolhouse on 10 June 1873. The council was made up of six councillors, including John McCutcheon, who was elected the Township's first Warden. On 20 February 1908, the area that was then known as Chilliwack, i.e., the subdivision within the greater Chilliwhack Township, was incorporated as the City of Chilliwack under the Chilliwack City Incorporation Act of 1908. The City of Chilliwack and the Township of Chilliwhack co-existed as separately administered municipalities until 1980.

On 1 January 1980, the Township of Chilliwhack and the City of Chilliwack amalgamated to form a single municipality styled the District of Chilliwack 6 months after holding plebiscites in both municipalities. The referendums passed with 90 percent support in the City and 62 percent support in the Township. On 16 July 1999, the District of Chilliwack, once again, was renamed the City of Chilliwack.

== Elections ==
General local elections are held every four years, with general voting day in the third Saturday in October. The most recent election took place on 17 October 2026.

=== 2026 results ===
The estimated eligible voter turnout was 26%. The results for mayor of Chilliwack were as follows:

Party	Mayoral candidate	Votes	%
Independent	Jason Lum	15,525	82.33
Conservative	Martina Rosini	2,198	11.66
Independent	Gary Raddysh	872	4.62
Independent	Farooque Syed	262	1.39

Source: "Chilliwack (City) Election Results". localelections.ca.

The results for Chilliwack City Council were as follows: Top 6 candidates elected

Council candidate	Vote	%
Chris Kloot	11,675	11.98
Nicole Huitema-Read	10,513	10.79
Trevor McDonald	8,223	8.44
Steve Czeck	6,583	6.75
Kevin Baarda	6,437	6.60
Sue Attrill-Knott	6,385	6.55
Leanna Kemp	6,237	6.40
Luke Zandeberg	6,010	6.17
Jared Mumford	5,620	5.77
Danielle Beausoleil	4,081	4.19
Brent Bowker	4,006	4.11
Zeeshan Khan	3,922	4.02
Raylene Mumford	3,379	3.47
Lisa Morry	3,559	3.45
Darren Blakeborough	3,283	3.37
Ghazaleh Nozamani	2,853	2.93
Daryl Moniz	2,077	2.13
Steve Just	1,700	1.74
Nilsana Charkhandeh	1,122	1.15

Source: "Chilliwack (City) Election Results". localelections.ca.

=== 2022 results ===
The estimated eligible voter turnout for 2022 was 24.8%, 4.4% lower than the provincial average of 29.2%. The results for mayor were as follows:

Mayoral candidate	Vote	%
Ken Popove (incumbent)	12,035	69.4
Ian Carmichael	4,056	23.4

The results for councillor were as follows:

Top 6 candidates elected

Council candidate	Vote	%
Jason Lum (incumbent)	10,766	62.1
Chris Kloot (incumbent)	9,482	54.7
Nicole Huitema Read	9,153	52.8
Jeff Shields (incumbent)	8,622	49.7
Harv Westeringh (incumbent)	8,048	46.4
Bud Mercer (incumbent)	7,970	46.0
Amber Price	7,488	43.1
Jared Mumford	6,013	34.7
Mike McLatchy	4,709	27.2
Debora Soutar	4,673	27.0
Brent Bowker	3,191	18.4
Craig Hill	1,029	6.0

=== 2018 results ===
The estimated eligible voter turnout for 2018 was 39%, which was 3.4% higher than the provincial average of 35.5%. The results were as follows:

Mayoral candidate	Vote	%
Ken Popove	8,432	34.1
Sharon Gaetz (incumbent)	7,426	30.1
Sam Waddington	6,988	28.3
Dave Rowan	775	3.1
Brigida Crosbie	409	1.7

The results for councillor were as follows:

Top 6 candidates elected

Council candidate	Vote	%
Jason Lum (incumbent)	15,604	63.2
Chris Kloot (incumbent)	13,298	53.8
Bud Mercer	12,053	48.8
Jeff Shields	10,857	44.0
Sue Attrill (incumbent)	10,113	40.9
Harv Westeringh	8,745	35.4
Louis De Jaeger	7,931	32.1
Terry Cross	6,310	25.5
Patti MacAhonic	6,227	25.2
Sandy Mathies	5,677	23.0
Debora Soutar	5,342	21.6
Lisa Morry	4,676	18.9
Ken Smith	3,386	13.7
Cameron Hull	2,547	10.3

=== 2014 results ===
Beginning in 2014, general local elections must be held every four years. Previously, elections were held every three years. The estimated eligible voter turnout for 2014 was 26%, which was 9% lower than the provincial average of 34.5%. The results were as follows:

Mayoral candidate	Vote	%
Sharon Gaetz (incumbent)	10,183	68.4
Cameron Hull	2,731	18.4
Raymond Cauchi	1,066	7.2

The results for councillor were as follows:

Top 6 candidates elected

Council candidate	Vote	%
Samuel Waddington	8,680	58.3
Jason Lum (incumbent)	7,842	52.7
Ken Popove (incumbent)	7,548	50.7
Chuck Stam (incumbent)	7,132	47.9
Sue Attrill (incumbent)	6,027	40.5
Chris Kloot	4,916	33.0
Patti MacAhonic	3,783	25.4
Stewart McLean (incumbent)	3,631	24.4
Kim Harder	3,620	24.3
Gerry Goosen	3,143	21.1
Dick Harrington	3,030	20.4
Brenda Currie	2,621	18.0
Michael Kha	2,557	17.2
Phill Bruce	2,453	16.5
Brigida Crosbie	1,133	7.6
Phillip Maxwell	912	6.1
Richard Williams	619	4.2

=== 2011 results ===
The estimated eligible voter turnout for 2011 was 16.1% which was 14.5% lower than the provincial average of 30.6%. The incumbent mayor ran unopposed.

Mayoral candidate	Vote	%
Sharon Gaetz (incumbent)	Acclaimed	

The results for councillor were as follows:

Top 6 candidates elected

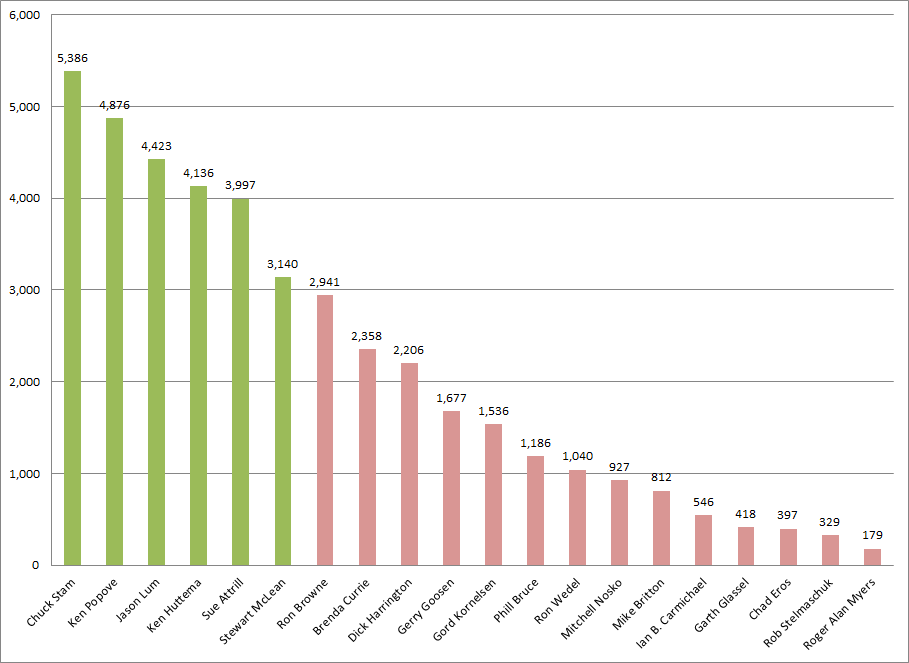
Chilliwack city council election results for 2011 Source: chilliwack.ca. Retrieved 3 March 2014

Council candidate	Vote	%
Chuck Stam (incumbent)	5,386	57.6
Ken Popove	4,876	52.2
Jason Lum	4,423	47.3
Ken Huttema (incumbent)	4,136	44.3
Sue Attrill (incumbent)	3,997	42.8
Stewart McLean (incumbent)	3,140	33.6
Ron Browne	2,941	31.5
Brenda Currie	2,358	25.2
Dick Harrington	2,206	23.6
Gerry Goosen	1,677	17.9
Gord Kornelsen	1,536	16.4
Phill Bruce	1,186	12.7
Ron Wedel	1,040	11.1
Mitchell Nosko	927	9.9
Mike Britton	812	8.7
Ian B. Carmichael	546	5.8
Garth Glassel	418	4.5
Chad Eros	397	4.2
Rob Stelmaschuk	329	3.5
Roger Alan Myers	179	1.9

=== 2008 results ===
The estimated eligible voter turnout for 2008 was 24.3% which was 4.6% lower than the provincial average of 28.9%. The results were as follows:

Mayoral candidate	Vote	%
Sharon Gaetz	8,889	70.4
Wayne Massey	2,324	18.4
Norm Smith	925	7.3

The results for councillor were as follows:

Top 6 candidates elected

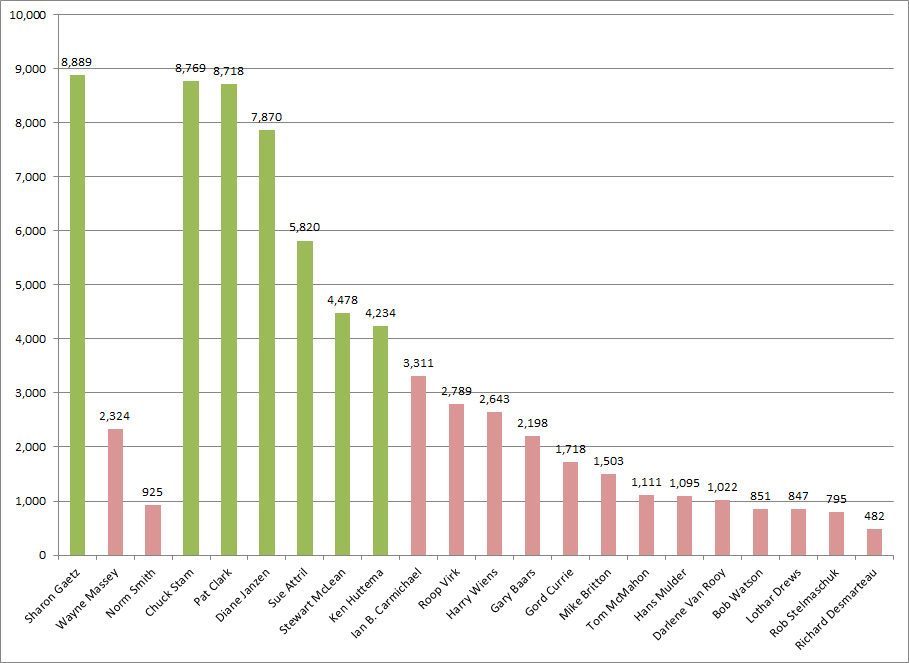
Chilliwack city council election results for 2008 Source: chilliwack.ca. Retrieved 3 March 2014

Council candidate	Vote	%
Chuck Stam (incumbent)	8,769	69.4
Pat Clark (incumbent )	8,718	69.0
Diane Janzen	7,870	62.3
Sue Attril	5,820	46.1
Stewart McLean	4,478	35.4
Ken Huttema	4,234	33.5
Ian B. Carmichael	3,311	26.2
Roop Virk	2,789	22.1
Harry Wiens	2,643	20.9
Gary Baars	2,198	17.4
Gord Currie	1,718	13.6
Mike Britton	1,503	11.9
Tom McMahon	1,111	8.8
Hans Mulder	1,095	8.7
Darlene Van Rooy	1,022	8.1
Bob Watson	851	6.7
Lothar Drews	847	6.7
Rob Stelmaschuk	795	6.3
Richard Desmarteau	482	3.8

=== 2005 results ===
A total of 7,406 ballots were cast in the 2005 election. Clint Hames ran unopposed for mayor and was acclaimed for a third term. All of the incumbent councillors were re-elected. The results were as follows:

Mayoral candidate	Vote	%
Clint Hames (incumbent)	Acclaimed	

The results for councillor were as follows:

Top 6 candidates elected

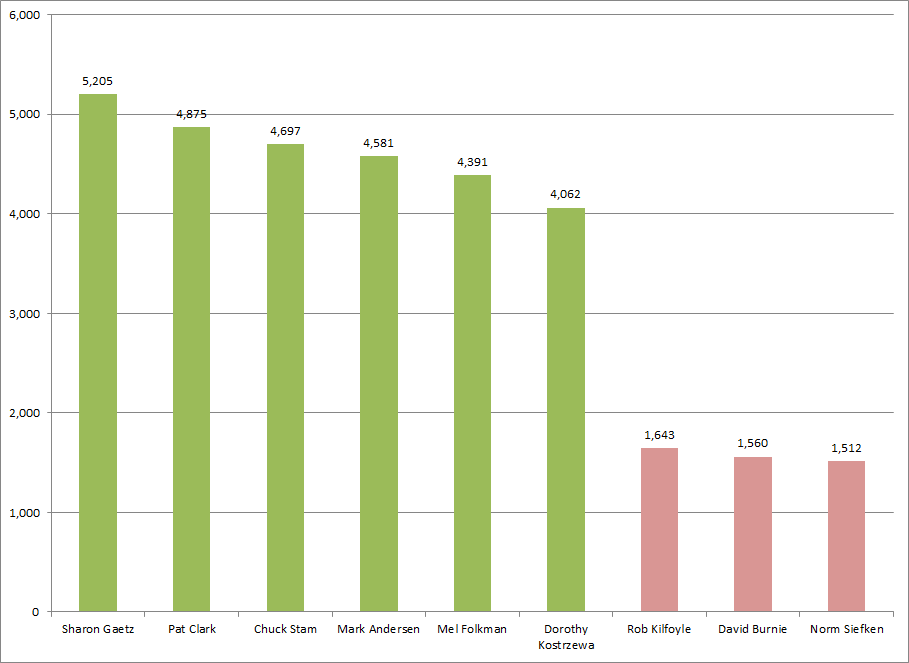
Chilliwack city council election results for 2005 Source: chilliwack.ca. Retrieved 3 March 2014

Council candidate	Vote	%
Sharon Gaetz (incumbent)	5,205	70.3
Pat Clark (incumbent)	4,875	65.8
Chuck Stam (incumbent)	4,697	63.4
Mark Andersen (incumbent)	4,581	61.9
Mel Folkman (incumbent)	4,391	59.3
Dorothy Kostrzewa (incumbent)	4,062	54.8
Rob Kilfoyle	1,643	22.2
David Burnie	1,560	21.1
Norm Siefken	1,512	20.4

=== 2003 by-election results ===
A by-election was held on 20 September 2003 to fill the position formerly held by Councillor Bernie Cross, who died on 15 June 2003. The estimated eligible voter turnout was 7.8 percent, compared to an average turnout of 5 percent for municipal by-elections. The results were as follows:

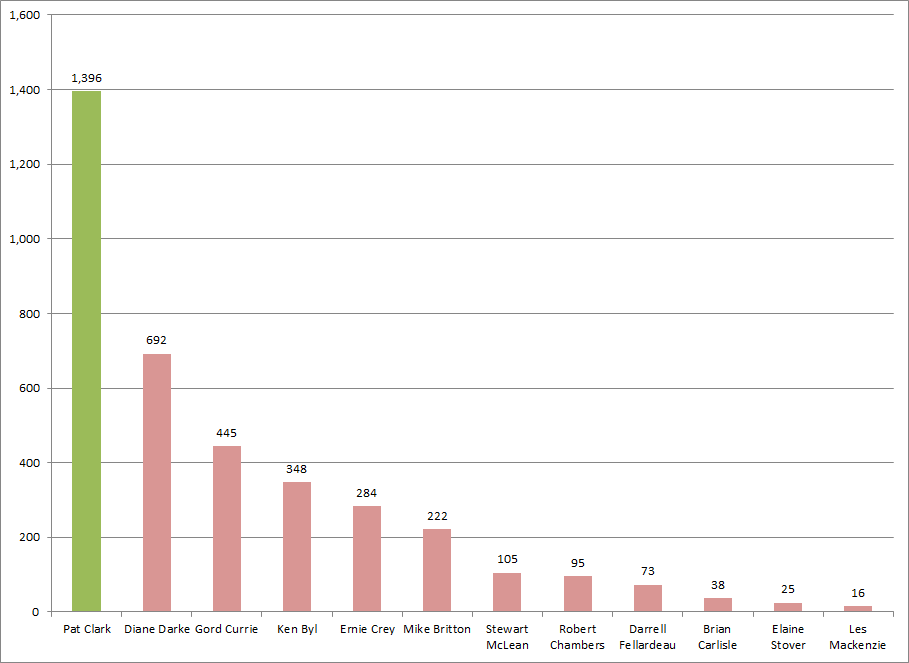
Chilliwack city council by-election results for 2003 Source: chilliwack.ca. Retrieved 4 March 2014

Council candidate	Vote	%
Pat Clark	1,396	37.3
Diane Darke	692	18.5
Gord Currie	445	11.9
Ken Byl	348	9.3
Ernie Crey	284	7.6
Mike Britton	222	5.9
Stewart McLean	105	2.8
Robert Chambers	95	2.5
Darrell Fellardeau	73	2.0
Brian Carlisle	38	1.0
Elaine Stover	25	0.7
Les Mackenzie	16	0.4

=== 2002 results ===
Mayoral candidate	Vote	%
Clint Hames (incumbent)	8,944	86.8
Brian Carlisle	1,355	13.2

The results for councillor were as follows:

Top 6 candidates elected

Council candidate	Vote	%
Sharon Gaetz (incumbent)	7,408	14.4
Chuck Stam (incumbent)	6,685	13.0
Mel Folkman (incumbent)	6,379	12.4
Bernie Cross (incumbent)	6,195	12.1
Dorothy Kosrzewa (incumbent)	5,762	11.2
Mark Andersen	4,591	8.9
Etta Richmond	4,427	8.6
Dianne Darke	2,825	5.5
Jillian Armit	1,879	3.7
Ann Forsyth	1,588	3.1
Michael Beaudry	1,515	2.9
Mary-Ann Jones-Siebert	1,160	2.3
Rachel Meek	946	1.8

=== 1999 results ===
Mayoral candidate	Vote	%
Clint Hames	6,428	46.5
Ywe Looper	4,622	33.4
Shirley Unruh	1,585	11.5
Gord Currie	1,133	8.2
Arthur Crossman	63	0.5

The results for councillor were as follows:

Top 6 candidates elected

Council candidate	Vote	%
Sharon Gaetz (incumbent)	7,900	11.6
Casey Langbroek (incumbent)	7,683	11.3
Bernie Cross (incumbent)	7,319	10.8
Dorothy Kostrzewa (incumbent)	6,902	10.1
Chuck Stam (incumbent)	6,147	9.0
Mel Folkman	5,800	8.5
Grant Ullyot	5,724	8.4
Douglas Steinson (incumbent)	4,534	6.7
Roop Virk	3,187	4.7
Mike Hale	3,031	4.5
Ron Wedel	2,148	3.2
Ira Lefebvre	2,131	3.1
Al Zilke	2,072	3.0
Joseph Gagne	2,017	3.0
William Tams	1,457	2.1

=== 1996 results ===
Despite a record number of candidates, the estimated eligible voter turnout for the 1996 local general election was around 25 percent, compared to 33 percent in 1993 and 59 percent in 1990. The low turnout was attributed to a snowstorm on election night.

Mayoral candidate	Vote	%
John Les (incumbent)	5,232	55.9
Gord Currie	1,827	19.5
Ernest Hjalmarson	1,630	17.4
Clara Hooper	476	5.1

The results for councillor were as follows:

Top 6 candidates elected

Council candidate	Vote	%
Casey Langbroek (incumbent)	4,332	46.3
Bernie Cross (incumbent)	3,943	42.2
Dorothy Kostrzewa (incumbent)	3,900	41.7
Clint Hames (incumbent)	3,800	40.6
Sharon Gaetz	3,227	34.5
Douglas Steinson (incumbent)	3,210	34.3
Mel Folkman	3,033	32.4
Grant Ullyot	2,829	30.2
Rollie Keith	2,367	25.3
Gloria Beshara	2,107	22.5
Sig Huth	2,100	22.5
Jean Anderson	2,118	22.6
Edith Grainger	1,030	11.0
Clint Marvin	1,430	15.3
Harry Wiens	1,301	13.9
Joseph Gagne	1,007	10.8
Bruce Temple	1,107	11.8
Heather Maclaren	970	10.4
Klara Hills	833	8.9
John Monger	404	4.3
Barbara Townley-Oak	479	5.1
Al Ricard	322	3.4
Ellenore Mack	233	2.5

=== 1993 results ===
The eligible voter turnout for the 1993 local general election was approximately 33 percent, compared to 59 percent in 1990. The total number of ballots cast was approximately 2,500 fewer than in 1990, despite an increase in population of about 10,000 residents during the same period.

Mayoral candidate	Vote	%
John Les (incumbent)	7,097	73.4
Bert Fleenor	1,492	15.4
Les MacKenzie	1,630	16.9
Clara Hooper	476	4.9

The results for councillor were as follows:

Top 6 candidates elected

Council candidate	Vote	%
Casey Langbroek (incumbent)	4,659	48.2
Dorothy Kostrzewa (incumbent)	4,528	46.8
Clint Hames (incumbent)	1,462	15.1
Don Spice	4,189	43.3
Bernie Cross	3,619	37.4
Doug Steinson	3,032	31.4
Ells Hugh	2,839	29.4
Lachlan Macintosh	2,761	28.6
Wayne Dehnke	2,661	27.5
Terry Shields	2,143	22.2
Gladys Brown	1,796	18.6
Gord Currie	1,774	18.4
Henry Klop	1,751	18.1
John Kramer	1,711	17.7
Charles Bloch	1,263	13.1
Jorgen Munck	1,231	12.7
John Cameron	1,058	10.9
Mark Johnston	1,057	10.9
Pat Paquette	1,054	10.9
Lynn Swinson	893	9.2
Gerald Anderson	191	2.0

=== 1990 results ===
Eligible voter turnout for the 1990 local general election was approximately 57.6 percent compared to 63.4 percent in the previous election.

Mayoral candidate	Vote	%
John Les (incumbent)	8,376	70.6
Sherry Baker	3,026	25.5
Tom Knowles	461	3.9

The results for alderman were as follows:

Top 6 candidates elected

Aldermanic candidate	Vote	%
Casey Langbroek (incumbent)	7,405	62.4
Gary Mason (incumbent)	7,092	59.8
Dorothy Kostrzewa (incumbent)	7,023	59.2
Phil Hall (incumbent)	6,572	55.4
Peter Dyck	5,800	48.9
Clint Hames	4,832	40.7
Lori Onsorge	4,539	38.3
John Kramer	4,303	36.3
Gordon Currie	3,207	27.0
Ernie Hjalmarson	3,194	26.9
Ken Jessiman	2,995	25.2

=== 1987 results ===
The 1987 local general elections were held on 21 November 1987. Eligible voter turnout was 63.5 percent. John Les ran unopposed for mayor.

Mayoral candidate	Vote	%
John Les (incumbent)	Acclaimed	

The results for alderman were as follows:

Top 6 candidates elected

Aldermanic candidate	Vote	%
Casey Langbroek (incumbent)	6,437	52.0
Sherry Baker (incumbent)	5,689	46.0
Gary Mason (incumbent)	5,590	45.2
Phil Hall	5,114	41.4
Ells Hugh	4,842	39.2
Dorothy Kostrzewa	4,527	36.6
Stuart Muxlow (incumbent)	4,486	36.3
Gary Wagner	3,601	29.1
Pat O'Brien	3,048	24.6
John Kramer	2,933	23.7
Angela Zieleman	2,486	20.1

=== 1987 by-election results ===
By-elections were held on 14 February 1987 to fill the mayoral seat that was vacated by John Jansen after he was elected to the provincial legislature a few months earlier, and also to fill the aldermanic seat left vacant by John Les, who was elected to succeed Jansen as mayor.

The results of the mayoral race were as follows:

Top candidate elected

Mayoral candidate	Vote	%
John Les	4,571	53.2
Fred Tunbridge	1,933	22.5
Eldon Unger	1,408	16.4
Gordon Currie	434	5.1
Gerald Kirby	247	2.9

The results of the aldermanic race were as follows:

Top candidate elected

Aldermanic candidate	Vote	%
Casey Langbroek	4,660	54.8
Bud McKay	1,687	19.8
George Vickery	1,605	18.9
Fred Nelson	549	6.5

=== 1985 results ===
Eligible voter turnout for the 1985 local general election was 23.2 percent with 5,504 ballots cast. The number of council members was reduced from nine to seven, including six aldermen and the mayor.

Mayoral candidate	Vote	%
John Jansen (incumbent)	Acclaimed	

The results for alderman were as follows:

Top 6 candidates elected

Aldermanic candidate	Vote	%
John Les (incumbent)	3,271	59.4
Sherry Baker (incumbent)	3,192	58.0
Gary Mason (incumbent)	3,032	55.1
Gary Dixon (incumbent)	3,020	54.9
Stuart Muxlow (incumbent)	2,961	53.8
Fred Bryant (incumbent)	2,952	53.6
Fred Tunbridge (incumbent)	2,848	51.7
Pat O'Brien (incumbent)	2,568	46.7
Dorothy Kostrzewa	2,040	37.1
Adrian Prinse	1,856	33.7

=== 1984 results ===
The 1984 election, which was held on 17 November, was a transitional one because of the measures passed by referendums in 1983 to (1) hold general elections every two years instead of holding staggered elections every year, and (2) reduce the number of aldermen from eight to six. Previously, aldermen were elected to a two-year term, and half of the aldermanic seats would be up for election each year. Following the 1983 referendum, council members would still be elected for two-year terms, however the 1984 cohort was elected to a foreshortened term to bring them in line with the other members.

The results for alderman were as follows:

Top 4 candidates elected

Aldermanic candidate	Vote	%
John Les (incumbent)	3,440	45.3
Fred Bryant (incumbent)	3,290	43.3
Sherry Baker	3,189	42.0
Stuart Muxlow	3,131	41.2
Dorothy Kostrzewa	2,940	38.7
Adrian Prinse (incumbent)	2,632	34.7
Jerry Pirie (incumbent)	2,497	32.9
Marty Hurley	2,293	30.2
Fred Tossell	1,078	14.2
Florence-Marie Rice	855	11.3

=== 1984 by-election results ===
At the same time as the regular 1984 civic elections, a by-election was also held to fill the aldermanic seat formerly held by C.M. 'Boots' Boutilier, who died mid-term while fishing on Vancouver Island with his sons.

The results of the aldermanic by-election were as follows:

Top candidate elected

Aldermanic candidate	Vote	%
Gary Mason	2,705	38.6
Roy Huband	2,671	38.1
Ernie Hjalmarson	1,627	23.2

=== 1983 results ===
The 1983 general elections were held on 19 November 1983. Turnout was 28 percent of the 22,519 eligible voters. The incumbent Mayor Geoff Clark was defeated by former alderman John Jansen. A by-election was also held to fill the aldermanic seat formerly held by Jansen. Proposals to hold municipal elections every two years instead every year, and to reduce the number of council members from eight to six, were supported by referendums.

Mayoral candidate	Vote	%
John Jansen	3,910	53.1
Geoff Clark (incumbent)	3,460	46.9

The results for alderman were as follows:

Top 4 candidates elected

Aldermanic candidate	Vote	%
Fred Tunbridge (incumbent)	4,425	60.0
C.M. Boutillier (incumbent)	4,188	56.8
Gary Dixon (incumbent)	3,936	53.4
Pat O'Brien (incumbent)	3,782	51.3
Peter Cave	3,315	45.0
Roy Husband	3,273	44.4
Les Leger	2,203	29.9

The results of the by-election to fill the aldermanic seat that was vacated mid-term were as follows:

Top candidate elected

Aldermanic candidate	Vote	%
John Les	4,818	65.4
Fred Tossell	2,117	28.7

=== 1982 results ===
The 1982 election was held on 24 November. The total number of votes cast was 5,044 and the eligible voter turnout was 22.2 percent. A referendum on whether to allow sports and entertainment on Sundays passed 3,246 votes to 1,669.

The results of the aldermanic election were as follows:

Top 4 elected

Aldermanic candidate	Vote	%
John Jansen (incumbent)	3,362	66.7
Adrian Prinse (incumbent)	2,528	50.1
Fred Bryant (incumbent)	2,378	47.1
Jerry Pirie	1,786	35.4
Dick Smith	1,543	30.6
Ken Fraser	1,514	30.0
Gail Blackwell	1,459	28.9
Les Leger	1,392	27.6
Willard Werk	1,259	25.0
G.H. 'Curly' Gunia	570	11.3

== Former members ==
- Sharon Gaetz, 1996–2018
- John Jansen, 1980–1987
- Dorothy Kostrzewa, 1969–2008
- John Les, 1983–1999
- Ken Popove, 2014–2026
