= Barry Penner =

Canadian politician

Barry Penner KC
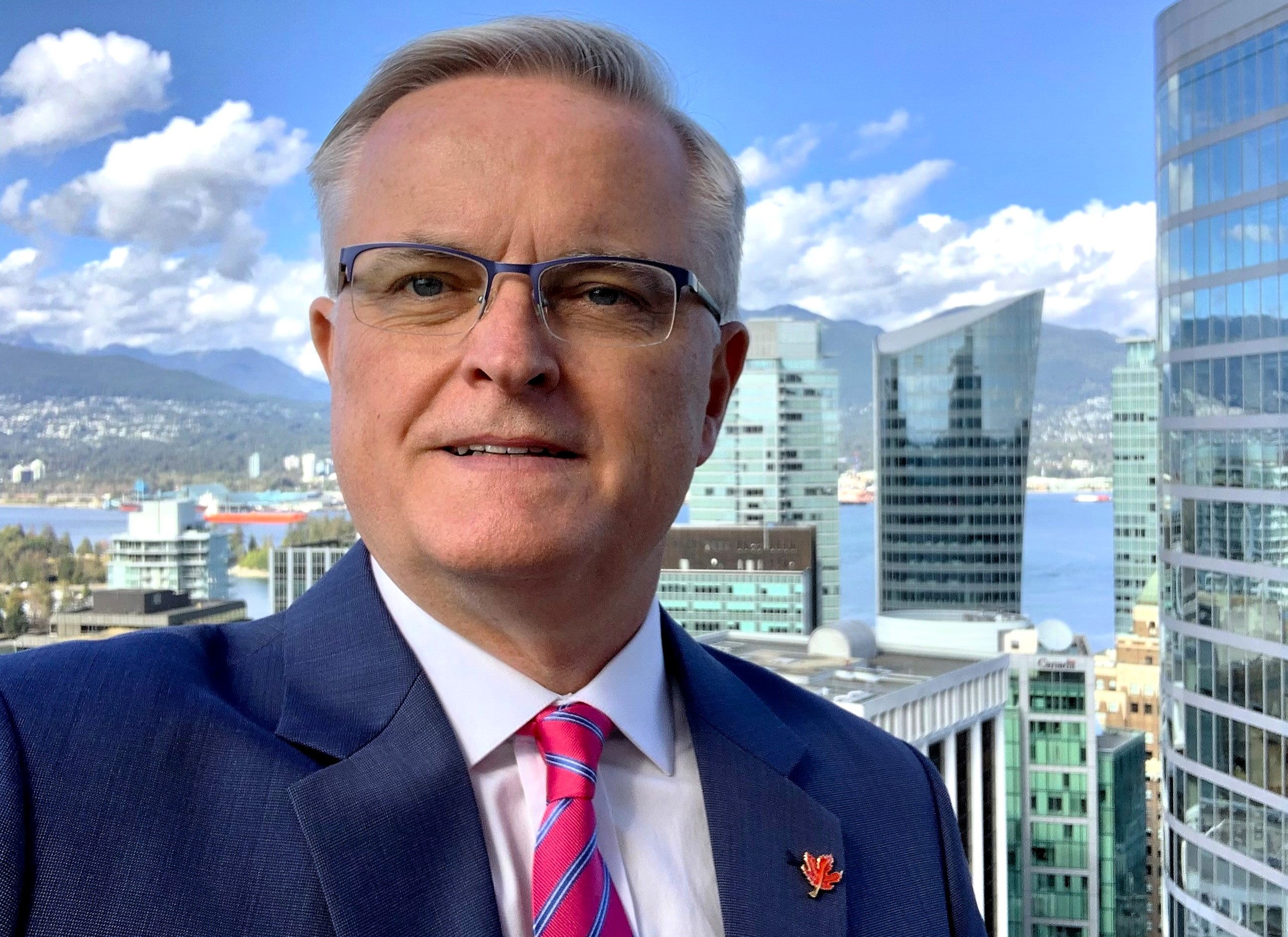

Attorney General of British Columbia
- In office December 1, 2010 – August 18, 2011
- Premier: Gordon Campbell; Christy Clark
- Preceded by: Michael de Jong
- Succeeded by: Shirley Bond

Minister of Aboriginal Relations and Reconciliation of British Columbia
- In office October 25, 2010 – March 14, 2011
- Premier: Gordon Campbell
- Preceded by: George Abbott
- Succeeded by: Mary Polak

Minister Responsible for Climate Action of British Columbia
- In office January 19, 2009 – June 10, 2009
- Premier: Gordon Campbell
- Preceded by: Position established
- Succeeded by: John Yap (Minister of State for Climate Action)

Minister of Environment of British Columbia
- In office June 16, 2005 – October 25, 2010
- Premier: Gordon Campbell
- Preceded by: Bill Barisoff
- Succeeded by: Murray Coell

Minister Responsible for Water Stewardship and Sustainable Communities of British Columbia
- In office June 16, 2005 – June 23, 2008
- Premier: Gordon Campbell
- Preceded by: Position established
- Succeeded by: Position abolished

Member of the British Columbia Legislative Assembly for Chilliwack-Hope Chilliwack-Kent (2001-2009) Chilliwack (1996-2001)
- In office May 28, 1996 – January 9, 2012
- Preceded by: Bob Chisholm
- Succeeded by: Gwen O'Mahony

Personal details
- Born: January 9, 1966 (age 60) Kitimat, British Columbia
- Party: BC Liberal
- Education: Fraser Valley College; Simon Fraser University; University of Victoria
- Profession: lawyer

Barry Penner, KC (born January 9, 1966) is a Canadian lawyer and former politician in the province of British Columbia. He served as a Member of the Legislative Assembly of British Columbia (MLA), representing the riding of Chilliwack from 1996 to 2001, Chilliwack-Kent from 2001 to 2009, and Chilliwack-Hope from 2009 to 2012. A caucus member of the British Columbia Liberal Party, he served in several cabinet posts under premiers Gordon Campbell and Christy Clark, including as Minister of Environment, Minister of Aboriginal Relations and Reconciliation, and Attorney General.

== Early life and career ==
Born in Kitimat, British Columbia in 1966, Penner grew up in Chilliwack in the eastern Fraser Valley, and spent his summers working as a park ranger and at a local sawmill. He attended the Fraser Valley College (now University of the Fraser Valley) for two years, graduating with a diploma in 1986; he was named one of the school's "Top 40" alumni in 2014.

He received a bachelor's degree in political science and economics from Simon Fraser University in Burnaby in 1989, and was selected for that year's British Columbia Legislative Internship Program. While studying law at the University of Victoria, Penner was one of the early participants in the school's Law Co-operative Education program and worked for a law firm in Bangkok, Thailand in 1991. He graduated with a law degree in 1992, and went on to practise in Chilliwack.

== Politics ==
Penner won the BC Liberal nomination to contest the riding of Chilliwack in the 1996 provincial election, over the incumbent Bob Chisholm. Penner was elected the riding's MLA, and was re-elected in 2001 and 2005 in the riding of Chilliwack-Kent with some of the highest margins of victory in the province. He was re-elected in the 2009 provincial election to represent the reconfigured Chilliwack-Hope constituency (which includes Agassiz, Harrison Hot Springs and the Fraser Canyon) with more than 53% of votes cast.

As an elected representative, Penner was an early advocate for expanding the use of Canada's DNA database to help identify, catch and convict violent criminals, and solve cases involving missing persons. He also introduced a motion in the legislature calling on the provincial government to establish an Amber alert system in BC to assist police in safely returning abducted children to their parents. The motion passed in 2003, and the Amber alert system became operational in 2004.

Penner became known as an advocate for small-hydro, wind power and other alternative energy sources after helping lead unprecedented community opposition in the Fraser Valley to the proposed Sumas Energy 2 power project.

He led protests against the New Democratic Party Government's decision in 1997 to close the Chilliwack Courthouse. Ultimately, the decision was reversed and a new Courthouse was constructed with the support of the City of Chilliwack.

Penner also launched a successful effort to raise awareness of a World War I hero, James Richardson, VC who is the only resident of Chilliwack to have been awarded the Victoria Cross. This culminated in a community effort to build a statue of the young piper on the grounds of Chilliwack's former City Hall.

Responding to a need for increased road safety, Penner approached the Minister of Transportation to address growing concerns about collisions on Highway 9 near Rosedale. This resulted in the first modern roundabout on a BC highway, reducing accidents and injuries. Penner also worked with the Minister of Transportation to have the first cable barrier on a major highway in British Columbia installed in the constituency he represented.

He was appointed by Premier Gordon Campbell to represent BC at the Pacific Northwest Economic Region in June 2001, and served as the organization's president from 2002 to 2003. He also chaired the Government Caucus Committee on Natural Resources, and was a member of the Standing Committee on Crown Corporations. He was named parliamentary secretary to government house leader Gary Collins in February 2004, and in that capacity also served as deputy house leader.

Following his re-election in 2005, he was named to the cabinet as Minister of Environment. In June 2007, Penner announced he would continue working as a Minister while receiving treatment for leiomyosarcoma, a rare type of cancer. He also served as Minister responsible for Water Stewardship and Sustainable Communities from 2005 to 2008, and Minister Responsible for Climate Action from January to June 2009.

He stayed on as environment minister after winning re-election in 2009, until being named Minister of Aboriginal Relations and Reconciliation in October 2010. He additionally assumed the duties of Attorney General in December 2010 to replace Mike de Jong, who resigned the post to contest the Liberal Party leadership. Penner remained as Attorney General after Christy Clark was sworn in as premier in March 2011, but was replaced in the aboriginal portfolio by Mary Polak.

During his time in provincial politics, Penner was recognized by Vancouver Magazine as one of the 50 most influential people in British Columbia.

== Post politics ==
On August 18, 2011, Penner stepped down as attorney general after deciding against running for another term as MLA, citing a desire to spend more time with his family. He remained as the MLA for Chilliwack-Hope and said he intended to remain as such until the next election. On November 24, 2011, he announced that he would resign in early 2012 as he had accepted a position with the law firm of Davis LLP, where he would work on environmental, energy and First Nations issues. He officially resigned his legislative seat on January 9, 2012.

In 2015, he established a legal and public public affairs practice known as Penner Pacific Advisory Services. Penner was appointed by the BC Liberal provincial government as chair of the board of directors of Insurance Corporation of British Columbia as of March 31, 2016. He served in that position until July 19, 2017, when the BC Liberals were replaced by an NDP administration. In November 2017 he became the managing director of British Columbia International Commercial Arbitration Centre. Penner was appointed Chair of the Energy Futures Institute in 2023.

Penner is currently an alternate member of the registration committee of the College of Physicians & Surgeons of British Columbia and is a past member of their board of directors, serving from 2015 to 2021. He is past arbiter for the New West Partnership Trade Agreement between British Columbia, Alberta and Saskatchewan.

In 2021, Penner was recognized as one of the top 500 most influential business leaders in British Columbia by Business in Vancouver magazine.

== Personal life ==
Mr. Penner has two daughters, Fintry, named after a provincial park on Okanagan Lake and Atlin, named after Atlin Provincial Park in northern British Columbia and that includes Atlin Lake, the largest natural lake in the province.

In May 2014, Penner moved to Myanmar (formerly known as Burma) with his family to work for a law firm assisting with inbound investment, particularly in telecommunications and energy. However, he returned with his family to British Columbia for the birth of his second child.

== Election results ==
2009 British Columbia general election: Chilliwack-Hope
Party	Candidate	Votes	%	Expenditures
Liberal	Barry Penner	8,985	53.28	$67,073
New Democratic	Gwen O'Mahony	5,638	33.43	$18,541
Conservative	Hans Mulder	1,198	7.10	$250
Green	Guy Durnin	951	5.64	$350
People's Front	Dorothy-Jean O'Donnell	93	0.55	$260
Total valid votes		16,865		
Total rejected ballots		95	0.56	
Turnout		16,960	51.85	
"Chilliwack-Hope B.C. Votes". CBC.ca.

2005 British Columbia general election: Chilliwack-Kent
Party	Candidate	Votes	%	Expenditures
Liberal	Barry Penner	11,368	57.14	$77,840
New Democratic	Malcolm James	6,534	32.84	$16,280
Green	Hans Mulder	1,651	8.30	$1,742
Moderates	David Michael Anderson	240	1.21	$120
Youth Coalition	Colin Wormworth	103	0.52	$100
Total valid votes		19,896	100	
Total rejected ballots		118	0.59	
Turnout		20,014	58.71	

B.C. General Election 2001: Chilliwack-Kent
Party	Candidate	Votes	%	±	Expenditures
Liberal	Barry Penner	13,814	74.88%		$40,938
NDP	Malcolm James	2,155	11.68%		$3,979
Green	Larry Commodore	1,511	8.19%	–	$890
Marijuana	David Ferguson	968	5.25%		$1,496
Total valid votes		18,448	100.00%		
Total rejected ballots		94	0.51%		
Turnout		18,542	71.63%		

36th British Columbia election, 1996 - Chilliwack (electoral district)
Party	Candidate	Votes	%	±	Expenditures
No Affiliation	Bob Chisholm	5,736	23.44%		unknown
New Democratic	Keith Rollie	5,989	24.88%		unknown
Green	Steve Kisby	232	0.95%	–	unknown
Liberal	Barry Penner	9,273	37.90%		unknown
Reform	Bill Wimpney	3,237	13.23%		unknown
Total valid votes		24,467	100.00%		
Total rejected ballots		107			
Turnout		%			
