= Heather Maahs =

Canadian politician

Heather Maahs MLA

Leader of the Opposition of British Columbia
- In office June 29, 2026 – September 20, 2026
- Preceded by: Trevor Halford
- Succeeded by: Lorne Doerkson

Parliamentary leader of the Conservative Party of British Columbia
- In office June 29, 2026 – September 20, 2026
- Leader: Kerry-Lynne Findlay
- Preceded by: Trevor Halford (as interim leader)
- Succeeded by: Lorne Doerkson (as interim leader)

Member of the British Columbia Legislative Assembly for Chilliwack North
- Incumbent
- Assumed office October 19, 2024
- Preceded by: Dan Coulter

Personal details
- Party: BC Conservative

Heather Maahs MLA is a Canadian politician who has served as a member of the Legislative Assembly of British Columbia (MLA) representing the electoral district of Chilliwack North since 2024. A member of the Conservative Party, she served as leader of the Opposition from June to September 2026.

== Early life and career ==
In 1993, Maahs and her husband moved from North Vancouver to Chilliwack. The couple operated a construction company together until her husband's death in 2009. She has three children and eleven grandchildren.

Maahs has completed specialized training in Orton Gillingham tutoring and early assessment from the University of Hull, with a focus on improving educational methods. For several years, she moderated an email list that facilitated discussion on educational issues among school trustees, teachers, and parents.

== Political career ==
=== Chilliwack school trustee ===
In 2008, Maahs was elected as a school trustee in the Chilliwack School District. She was subsequently re-elected five times over the following 16 years. During her tenure, she emphasized foundational reading skills and the importance of literacy in education. She has cited the guiding principle "first, we learn to read, then we read to learn" She was critical of "how sexuality was taught in the classroom and in library books such as All Boys Aren't Blue".

During her time as a school trustee, Maahs was censured three times by the Chilliwack Board of Education.

In March 2023, she was censured for violating the trustee code of conduct following her opposition to a student-led event promoting the school district's core values. In December 2023, she was censured again for reportedly refusing to remove a news story from her social media that was perceived as critical of the school district and its policies.

In February 2024, Maahs was censured a third time for failing to uphold board member confidentiality guidelines. While the board did not disclose the specific nature of the breach, Maahs was barred from attending in-camera meetings for the remainder of the school year. Maahs later stated that, earlier that same week, her motion requesting a report on vandalism in washroom facilities since the implementation of gender-neutral washrooms had been excluded from the meeting agenda.

In December 2024, Maahs submitted her resignation from the Chilliwack Board of Education, ending her service as its longest-standing member. She stated her intent to focus fully on her new role as a member of the Legislative Assembly following her victory in the 2024 provincial election.

=== Member of the Legislative Assembly ===
In February 2024, Maahs was nominated as the Conservative Party of BC's candidate for Chilliwack North. She went on to win her seat in the 2024 British Columbia general election, unseating NDP incumbent and cabinet minister Dan Coulter.

She served in the official opposition shadow cabinet as the critic for Children and Family Development – Indigenous Self-Government in Child and Family Services. Her priorities include education, parental rights, and combatting homelessness and addictions.

In May 2025 she drew criticism from members of her own party by hosting the Christian lobby group Association for Reformed Political Action (ARPA) at the legislature. The group advocates for the end of MAID, the restriction of abortion rights and opposes gender affirming care for transgender youth.

Following Kerry-Lynne Findlay's election as party leader in May 2026, Maahs became leader of the Opposition.

In October 2026, during the campaign period for the provincial snap elections, a 2022 video of Maahs comparing LGBTQ2S+ education to the grooming of kids resurfaced. Party leader Lorne Doerkson disavowed the comparison, but Maahs was not removed as a candidate. Later the same month Maahs was once again target of controversy when a 2021 blog post authored by her resurfaced. In the post she defends the use of blackface in school plays and a controversial fundraising event called "Slave For A Day".

== Electoral record ==
2024 British Columbia general election: Chilliwack North
Party	Candidate	Votes	%	±%	Expenditures
Conservative	Heather Maahs	11,776	54.58	+39.7	$36,179.76
New Democratic	Dan Coulter	8,125	37.66	−1.9	$50,357.69
Green	Tim Cooper	1,187	5.50	−4.6	$0.00
Independent	Dan Grice	487	2.26	–	$3,469.73
Total valid votes/expense limit		21,575	99.88	–	$71,700.08
Total rejected ballots		26	0.12	–	
Turnout		21,601	55.07	–	
Registered voters		39,227			
Conservative notional gain from New Democratic		Swing		+20.8	
Source: Elections BC

== See also ==
- 43rd Parliament of British Columbia
