= Nanaimo-Lantzville =

Provincial electoral district in British Columbia, Canada

British Columbia electoral district
- Location in Greater Nanaimo

Provincial electoral district
- Legislature: Legislative Assembly of British Columbia
MLA
George Anderson
New Democratic
- District created: 2021
- First contested: 2024
- Last contested: 2026

Demographics
- Census division: Nanaimo
- Census subdivision(s): Lantzville, Nanaimo, Nanaimo C, Nanoose

Nanaimo-Lantzville is a provincial electoral district for the Legislative Assembly of British Columbia, Canada. Created under the 2021 British Columbia electoral redistribution, the riding was first contested in the 2024 British Columbia general election. It was created out of parts of Nanaimo and Parksville-Qualicum.

== Geography ==
The district consists of the northern portion of the city of Nanaimo and the adjoining District of Lantzville.

== Members of the Legislative Assembly ==
| Assembly | Years | Member | Party |
|---|---|---|---|
| 43rd | 2024–2026 | George Anderson | New Democratic |
| 44th | 2026–present | George Anderson | New Democratic |

== Election results ==
2026 British Columbia general election
** Preliminary results — Not yet official **
| Party | Candidate | Votes | % | ±% |
|---|---|---|---|---|
| New Democratic | George Anderson | 11,567 | 46.66 | -5.09 |
| Conservative | Kelsey Pringle | 10,701 | 43.16 | +3.65 |
| Green | Sharleen Weatherley | 2,448 | 9.87 | +1.13 |
| Communist | Pepper Saltman | 76 | 0.31 | |
| Total valid votes | | 24,792 | 99.85 | |
| Total rejected ballots | | 38 | 0.15 | +0.02 |
| Turnout | | 24,830 | | |
| Registered voters | | | | |
Source: Elections BC
| New Democratic hold | | Swing | | –4.37 |

2024 British Columbia general election
| Party | Candidate | Votes | % | ±% | Expenditures |
|---|---|---|---|---|---|
| New Democratic | George Anderson | 15,307 | 51.75 | +3.7 | $63,351.11 |
| Conservative | Gwen O'Mahony | 11,687 | 39.51 | +37.4 | $27,508.78 |
| Green | Lia Versaevel | 2,586 | 8.74 | -11.3 | $4,373.36 |
| Total valid votes/expense limit | | 29,580 | 99.86 | – | $71,700.08 |
| Total rejected ballots | | 40 | 0.14 | – | |
| Turnout | | 29,620 | 66.00 | – | |
| Registered voters | | 44,879 | | | |
| New Democratic notional hold | | Swing | | -16.8 | |
Source: Elections BC

2020 provincial election redistributed results
| Party | % |
|---|---|
| New Democratic | 48.0 |
| Liberal | 29.7 |
| Green | 20.0 |
| Conservative | 2.1 |
| Independent | 0.2 |

== See also ==
- List of British Columbia provincial electoral districts
- Canadian provincial electoral districts
