= George Anderson (Canadian politician) =

Canadian lawyer and politician

George Anderson MLA
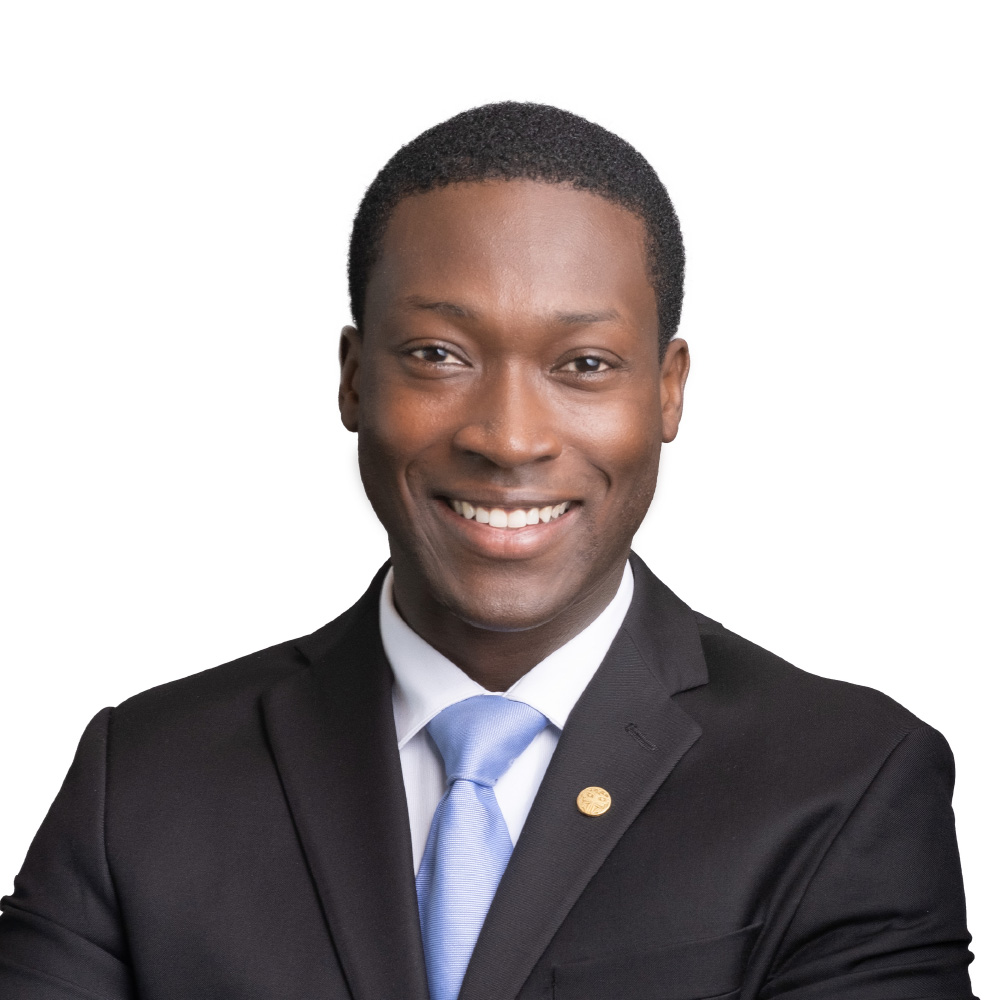
- Campaign portrait, 2024

Parliamentary Secretary for Transit of British Columbia
- Incumbent
- Assumed office November 18, 2024
- Premier: David Eby
- Preceded by: Position established

Member of the British Columbia Legislative Assembly for Nanaimo-Lantzville
- Incumbent
- Assumed office October 19, 2024
- Preceded by: Constituency established

Personal details
- Born: George A. G. Anderson; 1990 or 1991 (age 34–35) Nanaimo, British Columbia, Canada
- Party: BC NDP
- Education: Vancouver Island University (BA); York University
- Profession: Lawyer

George A. G. Anderson MLA (born 1990 or 1991) is a Canadian politician and lawyer who has served as a member of the Legislative Assembly of British Columbia (MLA) representing the electoral district of Nanaimo-Lantzville since 2024. He is a member of the New Democratic Party. Prior to provincial politics, he served as a Nanaimo City councillor from 2011 to 2014 and as a director for the Regional District of Nanaimo from 2011 to 2014 after being elected in the 2011 municipal election.

== Early life and career ==
Anderson was born and raised in Nanaimo, British Columbia. In 2015, he graduated as valedictorian from Vancouver Island University with a Bachelor of Arts degree, majoring in criminology. He later attended Osgoode Hall Law School in Toronto. He was co-president of the Osgoode Business Law Society.

Anderson briefly practised on Bay Street, before establishing himself as a commercial lawyer. He also worked at one of Canada's largest law firms prior to entering provincial politics. His practice involved: commercial, defence, and insurance litigation. Having worked on trials and class proceedings, Anderson has written and presented on: class actions, privacy and data security, and directors and officers liability.

Anderson has held volunteer roles including as chair of Vancouver Island University's board of governors, a volunteer for the Canadian Bar Association's Access to Justice Committee, president of Literacy Central Vancouver Island, a director of the Nanaimo Art Gallery, and volunteer with the Ontario Justice Education Network. In 2016, Anderson received the BC Achievement Award, presented by Lieutenant Governor of British Columbia, Judith Guichon, in recognition of his community service.

In 2026, Anderson endorsed Rob Ashton in that year's federal NDP leadership race.

== Electoral record ==
2026 British Columbia general election: Nanaimo-Lantzville
The 2026 general election will be held on October 24.
Party	Candidate	Votes	%	±%	Expenditures
New Democratic	George Anderson				
Conservative	Kelsey Pringle				
Green	Sharleen Weatherley				
Communist	Pepper Saltman				
Total valid votes					
Total rejected ballots					
Turnout					
Registered voters					
Source: Elections BC

2024 British Columbia general election: Nanaimo-Lantzville
Party	Candidate	Votes	%	±%	Expenditures
New Democratic	George Anderson	15,307	51.75	+3.7	$63,351.11
Conservative	Gwen O'Mahony	11,687	39.51	+37.4	$27,508.78
Green	Lia Versaevel	2,586	8.74	-11.3	$4,373.36
Total valid votes/expense limit		29,580	99.86	–	$71,700.08
Total rejected ballots		40	0.14	–	
Turnout		29,620	66.00	–	
Registered voters		44,879			
New Democratic notional hold		Swing		-16.8	
Source: Elections BC

== See also ==
- 43rd Parliament of British Columbia
