= Chilliwack North =

Provincial electoral district in British Columbia, Canada

British Columbia electoral district

Provincial electoral district
- Legislature: Legislative Assembly of British Columbia
MLA
Heather Maahs
Conservative
- District created: 2008
- First contested: 2009
- Last contested: 2026

Demographics
- Population (2021): 52,440
- Area (km²): 245
- Pop. density (per km²): 214
- Census division: Fraser Valley Regional District
- Census subdivision: Chilliwack (part)

Chilliwack North (formerly Chilliwack) is a provincial electoral district for the Legislative Assembly of British Columbia.

Its current boundaries were defined by the 2021 British Columbia electoral redistribution for use in the 2024 British Columbia general election onwards, with boundaries largely corresponding to its predecessor district.

== Demographics ==
Population, 2021	52,440
Area (km^{2})	245
Pop. Density (people per km^{2})	214
Source: BC Electoral Boundaries Commission

== Geography ==
The district encompasses the northern half of the City of Chilliwack, stretching from the city's urban core through the communities of Fairfield Island, Greendale, Rosedale and Popkum, and into the surrounding agricultural lands.

== History ==
Following the 2008 redistribution, the Chilliwack riding was re-established, primarily from Chilliwack-Sumas, while much of the neighbouring Chilliwack-Kent district was merged with parts of the Fraser Canyon formerly part of Yale-Lillooet to create the now-defunct Chilliwack-Hope electoral district.

Under the 2021 redistribution, the riding was renamed Chilliwack North, with revised boundaries taking effect for the 2024 provincial election.

== Members of the Legislative Assembly ==
This riding has elected the following members of the Legislative Assembly:

Assembly	Years	Member	Party
Chilliwack; Riding created from Chilliwack-Kent and Chilliwack-Sumas
39th	2009–2013	John Les	Liberal
40th	2013–2017	John Martin	Liberal
41st	2017–2020	John Martin	Liberal
42nd	2020–2024	Dan Coulter	New Democratic
Chilliwack North
43rd	2024–2026	Heather Maahs	Conservative
44th	2026–present	Heather Maahs	Conservative

== Electoral history ==
2026 British Columbia general election
The 2026 general election will be held on October 24.
Party	Candidate	Votes	%	±%	Expenditures
Conservative	Heather Maahs				
New Democratic	Adila Shaukat				
CentreBC	Dan Grice			–	
Total valid votes					
Total rejected ballots					
Turnout					
Registered voters					
Source: Elections BC

2024 British Columbia general election
Party	Candidate	Votes	%	±%	Expenditures
Conservative	Heather Maahs	11,776	54.58	+39.7	$36,179.76
New Democratic	Dan Coulter	8,125	37.66	−1.9	$50,357.69
Green	Tim Cooper	1,187	5.50	−4.6	$0.00
Independent	Dan Grice	487	2.26	–	$3,469.73
Total valid votes/expense limit		21,575	99.88	–	$71,700.08
Total rejected ballots		26	0.12	–	
Turnout		21,601	55.07	–	
Registered voters		39,227			
Conservative notional gain from New Democratic		Swing		+20.8	
Source: Elections BC

2020 provincial election redistributed results
Party	%
New Democratic	39.6
Liberal	31.3
Conservative	14.9
Green	10.1

2020 British Columbia general election: Chilliwack
Party	Candidate	Votes	%	±%	Expenditures
New Democratic	Dan Coulter	7,349	41.56	+9.18	$5,919.34
Liberal	John Martin	5,102	28.85	−19.57	$36,378.86
Conservative	Diane Janzen	2,910	16.46	–	$20,583.54
Green	Tim Cooper	1,888	10.68	−6.42	$2,161.84
Independent	Josue Anderson	257	1.45	–	$2,965.16
Libertarian	Andrew Coombes	177	1.00	–	$0.00
Total valid votes		17,683	100.00	–	
Total rejected ballots		216	1.21		
Turnout		17,899	47.04		
Registered voters		38,054			
New Democratic gain from Liberal		Swing		+14.38	
Source: Elections BC

2017 British Columbia general election: Chilliwack
Party	Candidate	Votes	%	±%	Expenditures
Liberal	John Martin	9,280	48.42	+0.84	$43,462
New Democratic	Tracey Lorrean O'Hara	6,207	32.38	+1.17	$7,077
Green	Wayne Froese	3,277	17.10	+8.71	$855
Independent	Ryan McKinnon	402	2.10	–	
Total valid votes		19,166	100.00		
Total rejected ballots		139	0.72		
Turnout		19,305	55.43		
Liberal hold		Swing		−0.17	
Source: Elections BC

2013 British Columbia general election: Chilliwack
Party	Candidate	Votes	%
Liberal	John Martin	9,983	47.58
New Democratic	Patti MacAhonic	6,548	31.21
Conservative	Chad Elton Eros	2,510	11.96
Green	Kim Reimer	1,761	8.39
Excalibur	Michael Raymond Halliday	181	0.86
Total valid votes		21,002	100.00
Total rejected ballots		101	0.48
Turnout		21,103	55.85
Source: Elections BC

B.C. General Election 2009 Chilliwack
Party	Candidate	Votes	%	±%
Liberal	John Les	8,138	44.61	
NDP	Mason Goulden	5,908	32.39	
Conservative	Benjamin Besler	2,672	14.65	
Green	Fraea Bolding	1,523	8.35	–
Total			18,241	100.00%

== See also ==
- List of British Columbia provincial electoral districts
- Canadian provincial electoral districts
