= Chilliwack-Hope (provincial electoral district) =

Defunct provincial electoral district in British Columbia, Canada

British Columbia electoral district

Defunct provincial electoral district
- Legislature: Legislative Assembly of British Columbia
- District created: 2008
- First contested: 2009
- Last contested: 2013

Demographics
- Population (2006): 43,980
- Area (km²): 10,832.98
- Census division: Fraser Valley Regional District
- Census subdivision(s): Chilliwack, Hope, Kent

Chilliwack-Hope was a provincial electoral district in British Columbia, Canada, established by the Electoral Districts Act, 2008. It was first contested in the 2009 British Columbia General Election. The riding was formed from an amalgamation of parts of Chilliwack-Kent, Yale-Lillooet, Chilliwack-Sumas, West Vancouver-Garibaldi, and Maple Ridge-Mission.

== History ==
Due to the re-alignment of electoral boundaries, most incumbents did not represent the entirety of their listed district during the preceding legislative term. Barry Penner, British Columbia Liberal Party was initially elected during the 2005 election and 2001 election to the Chilliwack-Kent riding. He successful ran for re-election again in the 2009 election in the Chilliwack-Hope riding.

Penner resigned the seat on January 9, 2012, and Gwen O'Mahony won the subsequent by-election on April 19, 2012.

Parliament	Years	Member	Party
Chilliwack-Kent, Yale-Lillooet and Chilliwack-Sumas prior to 2009
39th	2009–2011	Barry Penner	BC Liberal
39th	2012–2013	Gwen O'Mahony	New Democrat
40th	2013–2017	Laurie Throness	BC Liberal
Chilliwack-Kent, Fraser-Nicola and West Vancouver-Sea to Sky after 2017

== Results ==
2013 British Columbia general election
Party	Candidate	Votes	%
Liberal	Laurie Throness	10,053	49.15
New Democratic	Gwen O'Mahony	7,364	36.01
Conservative	Michael Henshall	2,202	10.77
Independent	Ryan Ashley McKinnon	833	4.07
Total valid votes		20,452	100.00
Total rejected ballots		117	0.57
Turnout		20,569	57.38
Source: Elections BC

British Columbia provincial by-election, April 19, 2012
Party	Candidate	Votes	%	±%
New Democratic	Gwen O'Mahony	6,022	41.89	+8
Liberal	Laurie Throness	4,593	31.95	-22
Conservative	John Martin	3,615	25.15	+18
Libertarian	Lewis Dahlby	145	1.01	
Total valid votes		14,375		
Total rejected ballots		26		
Turnout		14,401	41.12	
"Report of the Chief Electoral Officer on the Port Moody-Coquitlam and Chilliwack-Hope By-elections" (PDF). Elections B.C.

2009 British Columbia general election
Party	Candidate	Votes	%	Expenditures
Liberal	Barry Penner	8,985	53.28	$67,073
New Democratic	Gwen O'Mahony	5,638	33.43	$18,541
Conservative	Hans Mulder	1,198	7.10	$250
Green	Guy Durnin	951	5.64	$350
People's Front	Dorothy-Jean O'Donnell	93	0.55	$260
Total valid votes		16,865		
Total rejected ballots		95	0.56	
Turnout		16,960	51.85	
"Chilliwack-Hope B.C. Votes". CBC.ca.

== See also ==
- List of British Columbia provincial electoral districts
- Canadian provincial electoral districts
