= Faculties and Schools of the University of the Fraser Valley =

The University of the Fraser Valley (UFV), (formerly known as University College of the Fraser Valley and Fraser Valley College) is a Canadian public university with campuses in Abbotsford, Chilliwack, Mission and Hope, British Columbia, as well as a presence in Chandigarh, India. The following is a list of faculties and schools at UFV.

== Faculties and Schools ==
- Faculty of Arts (website)
  - Arts
    - Department of Communications (website)
    - Department of Economics (website)
    - Department of English (website)
    - Department of Geography (website)
    - Department of History (website)
    - Modern Languages Institute (website)
    - Department of Philosophy (website)
    - Department of Political Science (website)
    - Department of Psychology (website)
    - Department of Social, Cultural and Media studies (website)
    - Department of Theatre (website)
    - Department of Visual Arts (website)
  - School of Criminology and Criminal Justice (website)
- Faculty of Business and Computing (website)
  - Departments
    - Aviation (website)
    - Department of Early Childhood Education/Child & Youth Care (website)
    - Department of Applied Business Technology (website)
    - Department of Library and Information Technology (website)
  - School of Social Work and Human Services (website)
  - School of Business (website)
  - School of Computing (website)
- Faculty of Science (website)
  - Department of Biology (website)
  - Department of Chemistry (website)
  - Department of Geography (website)
  - Department of Math and Statistics (website)
- Faculty of Trades (website)
  - Department of Agriculture (website)
  - Department of Aircraft Structures (website)
  - Department of Architectural Drafting (website)
  - Department of Automotive Service
  - Automotive Collision Repair (website)
  - Department of Carpentry (website)
  - Department of Culinary Arts (website)
  - Department of Physics (website)
  - Electrical (website)
  - Department of Electronics (website)
  - Engineering Transfer Program (website)
  - Heavy Duty/Commercial Transport (website)
  - Hospitality/Event Planning (website)
  - Joinery (website)
  - Plumbing and Piping (website)
  - Welding (website)
- Faculty of Access and Continuing Studies (website)
- Faculty of Health Sciences (website)
  - School of Health Studies (website)
  - School of Kinesiology (website)
- School of Graduate Studies (website)
