= Chilliwack-Sumas =

Defunct provincial electoral district in British Columbia, Canada

Chilliwack-Sumas was a provincial electoral district for the Legislative Assembly of British Columbia, Canada, from 2001 to 2009.

== Demographics ==
Population, 2001	46,700
Population Change, 1996–2001	7.7%
Area (km^{2})	259.46
Pop. Density (people per km^{2})	180

== 1999 electoral redistribution ==
Changes from Chilliwack to Chilliwack-Sumas include:

- Removal of half of the city of Chilliwack
- Removal of all area east of the city of Chilliwack

Changes from other electoral district to Chilliwack-Sumas

- Inclusion of the southwestern portion of the city of Abbotsford
- Inclusion of Sumas Mountain

== Members of the Legislative Assembly ==
The only member of the Legislative Assembly (MLA) for this riding was Hon. John Les, a former mayor of Chilliwack. He was first elected in 2001. He represented the British Columbia Liberal Party. Mr. Les was appointed Minister of Small Business and Economic Development on Jan. 26, 2004.

== Election results ==
2005 British Columbia general election
Party	Candidate	Votes	%
Liberal	John Les	11,995	57.36
New Democratic	John-Henry Harter	6,477	30.97
Green	Norm Siefken	1,731	8.28
Democratic Reform	Brian Downey	315	1.51
Youth Coalition	Augustine Lee	266	1.27
Moderates	Adam James Solheim	127	0.61
Total		20,911	100.00

B.C. General Election 2001: Chilliwack-Sumas
Party	Candidate	Votes	%	±	Expenditures
Liberal	John Les	14,137	74.80%		$38,708
NDP	Christine Muise	2,434	12.88%		$4,360
Conservative	Grant Cepuran	1,199	6.34%		$354
Marijuana	Norm Siefken	1,130	5.98%		$973
Total valid votes		18,900	100.00%		
Total rejected ballots		168	0.89%		
Turnout		19,068	70.58%		

== See also ==
- List of British Columbia provincial electoral districts
- Canadian provincial electoral districts
