= Results of the 2017 British Columbia general election by riding =

British Columbia general election riding results 2017

The following tables present detailed results by riding as per Elections BC.

- Names in **bold** are outgoing cabinet ministers, and names in italics are party leaders. The premier is in **both**.
- † denotes incumbent MLAs who did not seek re-election.
- ‡ denotes incumbent MLAs who sought re-election in a different riding.
- A riding name in brackets below the name of the incumbent MLA indicates the name of the predecessor riding contested in the last election.
- Candidate names are given as they appeared on the ballot, and may include formal names and middle names that the candidate does not use in day-to-day political life. For example, Greg Kyllo appeared on the ballot as "Gregory James Kyllo".

== Results ==
=== Northern British Columbia ===
Electoral district	Candidates				Incumbent
Electoral district	Liberal	NDP	Green	Other	Incumbent
Nechako Lakes	**John Rustad**; 5,307 – 54.39%	Anne Marie Sam; 2,909 – 29.81%	Douglas Norman Gook; 878 – 9.00%	Jon Rempel (Ltn.); 438 – 4.49% Al Trampuh (Ind.); 226 – 2.32%	**John Rustad**
North Coast	Herb Pond; 3,079 – 33.66%	Jennifer Rice; 5,243 – 57.31%	Hondo Arendt; 826 – 9.03%		Jennifer Rice
Peace River North	Dan Davies; 9,707 – 66.31%	Rob Dempsey; 973 – 6.65%		Bob Fedderly (Ind.); 2,799 – 19.12% Rob Fraser (Ind.); 884 – 6.04% Jeff Richert (Ind.); 275 – 1.88%	Pat Pimm†
Peace River South	**Mike Bernier**; 6,634 – 75.94%	Stephanie Goudie; 2,102 – 24.06%			**Mike Bernier**
Prince George-Mackenzie	**Mike Morris**; 10,725 – 57.12%	Bobby Deepak; 5,942 – 31.65%	Hilary Crowley; 2,109 – 11.23%		**Mike Morris**
Prince George-Valemount	**Shirley Bond**; 11,189 – 58.20%	Natalie Fletcher; 5,683 – 29.56%	Nan Kendy; 2,353 – 12.24%		**Shirley Bond**
Skeena	Ellis Ross; 6,772 – 52.23%	Bruce Alan Bidgood; 5,613 – 43.29%		Merv Ritchie (LAW); 580 – 4.47%	Robin Austin†
Stikine	Wanda Good; 3,531 – 38.75%	Doug Donaldson; 4,748 – 52.10%		Rod Taylor (CHP); 834 – 9.15%	Doug Donaldson

=== Kootenays ===
Electoral district	Candidates				Incumbent
Electoral district	Liberal	NDP	Green	Other	Incumbent
Columbia River-Revelstoke	Doug Clovechok; 6,620 – 45.44%	Gerry Taft; 5,248 – 36.02%	Samson Boyer; 1,708 – 11.72%	Duncan Boyd MacLeod (Ind.); 469 – 3.22% Justin James Hooles (Ind.); 371 – 2.55% Rylan Kashuba (Ltn.); 154 – 1.06%	Norm Macdonald†
Kootenay East	Tom Glenn Shypitka; 9,666 – 56.57%	Randal Macnair; 5,069 – 29.67%	Yvonne Marie Prest; 1,926 – 11.27%	Keith D. Komar (Ltn.); 425 – 2.49%	**Bill Bennett**†
Kootenay West	Jim Postnikoff; 4,547 – 24.33%	Katrine Conroy; 11,164 – 59.74%	Sam Troy; 2,976 – 15.93%		Katrine Conroy
Nelson-Creston	Tanya Rae Wall; 5,087 – 27.93%	Michelle Mungall; 7,685 – 42.19%	Kim Charlesworth; 5,130 – 28.16%	Jesse O'Leary (Ind.); 164 – 0.90% Tom Prior (Ind.); 149 – 0.82%	Michelle Mungall

=== Okanagan, Shuswap and Boundary ===
Electoral district	Candidates				Incumbent
Electoral district	Liberal	NDP	Green	Other	Incumbent
Boundary-Similkameen	Linda Margaret Larson; 9,513 – 42.80%	Colleen Ross; 7,275 – 32.73%	Vonnie Lavers; 2,274 – 10.23%	Peter Entwistle (Ind.); 3,165 – 14.24%	Linda Larson
Kelowna-Lake Country	**Norm Letnick**; 15,286 – 59.75%	Erik Olesen; 5,345 – 20.89%	Alison Shaw; 4,951 – 19.35%		**Norm Letnick**
Kelowna-Mission	**Steve Thomson**; 15,399 – 57.18%	Harwinder Sandhu; 5,720 – 21.24%	Rainer Wilkins; 3,836 – 14.24%	Charles Hardy (Cons.); 1,976 – 7.34%	**Steve Thomson**
Kelowna West	**Christy Clark**; 15,674 – 59.05%	Shelley Cook; 6,672 – 25.14%	Robert Mellalieu; 3,628 – 13.67%	Brian Thiesen (Ind.); 570 – 2.15%	**Christy Clark**
Penticton	Dan Ashton; 14,470 – 52.80%	Tarik Sayeed; 7,874 – 28.73%	Connie Sahlmark; 5,061 – 18.47%		Dan Ashton
Shuswap	Gregory James Kyllo; 14,829 – 55.80%	Sylvia Jean Lindgren; 7,161 – 26.95%	Kevin Babcock; 4,175 – 15.71%	Kyle McCormack (Ltn.); 410 – 1.54%	Greg Kyllo
Vernon-Monashee	Eric Bailey Foster; 13,625 – 47.87%	Barry Charles Dorval; 8,355 – 29.36%	Keli Westgate; 6,139 – 21.57%	Don Jefcoat (Ltn.); 341 – 1.20%	Eric Foster

=== Thompson and Cariboo ===
Electoral district	Candidates				Incumbent
Electoral district	Liberal	NDP	Green	Other	Incumbent
Cariboo-Chilcotin	**Donna Barnett**; 8,520 – 58.78%	Sally Watson; 3,801 – 26.22%	Rita Helen Giesbrecht; 2,174 – 15.00%		**Donna Barnett**
Cariboo North	**Coralee Ella Oakes**; 6,359 – 51.06%	Scott Elliott; 4,430 – 35.57%	Richard Edward Jaques; 919 – 7.38%	Tony Goulet (Cons.); 747 – 6.00%	**Coralee Oakes**
Fraser-Nicola	Jackie L. Tegart; 6,597 – 41.97%	Harry Lali; 6,005 – 38.21%	Arthur Alexander Green; 2,517 – 16.01%	Michael Henshall (Social Credit); 598 – 3.80%	Jackie Tegart
Kamloops-North Thompson	Peter Gordon Milobar; 12,001 – 48.32%	Barb Nederpel; 7,538 – 30.35%	Dan Hines; 5,111 – 20.58%	Peter Paul Kerek (Comm.); 187 – 0.75%	**Terry Lake**†
Kamloops-South Thompson	**Todd Graham Stone**; 15,465 – 55.78%	Nancy Bepple; 6,072 – 21.90%	Donovan Cavers; 5,785 – 20.86%	Jessica Lea Bradshaw (Ltn.); 295 – 1.06% Beat Klossner (Comm.); 109 – 0.39%	**Todd Stone**

=== Fraser Valley ===
Electoral district	Candidates				Incumbent
Electoral district	Liberal	NDP	Green	Other	Incumbent
Abbotsford-Mission	Simon John Gibson; 12,879 – 51.19%	Andrew Murray Christie; 7,339 – 29.17%	Jennifer Holmes; 4,298 – 17.08%	Dan Cameron (CHP); 644 – 2.56%	Simon Gibson
Abbotsford South	Darryl Plecas; 11,673 – 52.46%	Jasleen Arora; 6,297 – 28.30%	William Aird Flavelle; 3,338 – 15.00%	Ron Gray (CHP); 942 – 4.23%	Darryl Plecas
Abbotsford West	**Michael de Jong**; 11,618 – 55.23%	Preet Rai; 6,474 – 30.77%	Kevin Allan Eastwood; 2,280 – 10.84%	Lynn Simcox (CHP); 516 – 2.45% Dave Sharkey (Ltn.); 149 – 0.71%	**Mike de Jong**
Chilliwack	John Martin; 9,180 – 48.15%	Tracey Lorrean O'Hara; 6,207 – 32.56%	Wayne Froese; 3,277 – 17.19%	Ryan McKinnon (Ind.); 402 – 2.11%	John Martin
Chilliwack-Kent	Laurie Throness; 11,814 – 52.75%	Patti MacAhonic; 7,273 – 32.40%	Josie Bleuer; 3,335 – 14.86%		Laurie Throness (Chilliwack-Hope)
Langley	**Mary Polak**; 10,755 – 44.40%	Gail Chaddock-Costello; 8,384 – 34.61%	Elizabeth Helen Walker; 3,699 – 15.27%	Justin Greenwood (Cons.); 1,221 – 5.04% Robert Kerr Pobran (Ltn.); 166 – 0.69%	**Mary Polak**
Langley East	**Rich Coleman**; 16,348 – 53.45%	Inder Johal; 8,820 – 28.84%	Bill Masse; 4,968 – 16.24%	Alex Joehl (Ltn.); 448 – 1.46%	**Rich Coleman** (Fort Langley-Aldergrove)
Maple Ridge-Mission	Marc Dalton; 10,663 – 40.70%	Bob D'Eith; 10,988 – 41.94%	Peter Pak Chiu Tam; 3,467 – 13.23%	Trevor Hamilton (Cons.); 934 – 3.57% Jeff Monds (Ltn.); 145 – 0.55%	Marc Dalton
Maple Ridge-Pitt Meadows	Doug Bing; 10,428 – 38.79%	Lisa Marie Beare; 12,045 – 44.80%	Alex Pope; 3,329 – 12.38%	Gary John O'Driscoll (Cons.); 676 – 2.51% Steve Ranta (Ind.); 408 – 1.52%	Doug Bing

=== Surrey ===
Electoral district	Candidates				Incumbent
Electoral district	Liberal	NDP	Green	Other	Incumbent
Surrey-Cloverdale	Marvin Hunt; 11,918 – 47.57%	Rebecca Smith; 9,763 – 38.97%	Aleksandra Muniak; 3,091 – 12.34%	Peter Poelstra (Ltn.); 279 – 1.11%	**Stephanie Cadieux**‡
Surrey-Fleetwood	**Peter Fassbender**; 7,413 – 35.83%	Jagrup Brar; 11,085 – 53.58%	Tim Binnema; 2,190 – 10.59%		**Peter Fassbender**
Surrey-Green Timbers	Brenda Joy Locke; 5,056 – 32.95%	Rachna Singh; 8,945 – 58.29%	Saira Aujla; 1,112 – 7.25%	Vikram Bajwa (NA); 163 – 1.06% Kanwaljit Singh Moti (YPP); 69 – 0.45%	Sue Hammell†
Surrey-Guildford	**Amrik Virk**; 7,015 – 37.76%	Garry Begg; 9,262 – 49.85%	Jodi Murphy; 1,840 – 9.90%	Kevin Pielak (CHP); 462 – 2.49%	**Amrik Virk** (Surrey-Tynehead)
Surrey-Newton	Gurminder Singh Parihar; 5,100 – 29.99%	Harry Bains; 9,744 – 57.31%	Richard Krieger; 1,171 – 6.89%	Balpreet Singh Bal (NA); 988 – 5.81%	Harry Bains
Surrey-Panorama	Puneet Sandhar; 10,064 – 41.86%	Jinny Sims; 12,226 – 50.85%	Veronica Laurel Greer; 1,620 – 6.74%	Liz Galenzoski (Refed); 132 – 0.55%	Marvin Hunt‡
Surrey South	**Stephanie Cadieux**; 13,509 – 50.94%	Jonathan Silveira; 8,718 – 32.87%	Pascal Tremblay; 3,141 – 11.84%	Peter Njenga (Ind.); 634 – 2.39% Josh Barrett (Ltn.); 311 – 1.17% Gary Hee (Ind.); 140 – 0.53% Fabiola Cecilia Palomino (YPP); 67 – 0.25%	new district
Surrey-Whalley	Sargy Chima; 5,293 – 30.08%	Bruce Ralston; 10,315 – 58.62%	Rita Anne Fromholt; 1,893 – 10.76%	George Gidora (Comm.); 96 – 0.55%	Bruce Ralston
Surrey-White Rock	Tracy Redies; 14,101 – 49.87%	Niovi Patsicakis; 8,648 – 30.59%	Bill Marshall; 4,574 – 16.18%	Tom Bryant (Ind.); 950 – 3.36%	Gordon Hogg†

=== Richmond and Delta ===
Electoral district	Candidates				Incumbent
Electoral district	Liberal	NDP	Green	Other	Incumbent
Delta North	Scott Hamilton; 9,319 – 39.69%	Ravi Kahlon; 11,465 – 48.83%	Jacquie Miller; 2,697 – 11.49%		Scott Hamilton
Delta South	Ian Paton; 11,123 – 44.10%	Bruce Reid; 5,228 – 20.73%	Larry Colero; 2,349 – 9.31%	Nicholas Wong (Ind.); 6,437 – 25.52% Errol Edmund Sherley (Action); 88 – 0.35%	Vicki Huntington†
Richmond North Centre	**Teresa Wat**; 7,916 – 52.48%	Lyren Chiu; 5,135 – 34.04%	Ryan Kemp Marciniw; 1,579 – 10.47%	Dong Pan (Ind.); 336 – 2.23% John Crocock (Action); 117 – 0.78%	**Teresa Wat** (Richmond Centre)
Richmond-Queensborough	Jas Johal; 8,218 – 41.43%	Aman Singh; 8,084 – 40.75%	Michael Wolfe; 2,524 – 12.72%	Kay Khilvinder Hale (Cons.); 694 – 3.50% Lawrence Chen (New Rep.); 318 – 1.60%	Linda Reid‡ (Richmond East)
Richmond South Centre	Linda Reid; 6,914 – 48.89%	Chak Au; 5,666 – 40.07%	Greg Powell; 1,561 – 11.04%		new district
Richmond-Steveston	John Yap; 10,332 – 47.60%	Kelly Greene; 8,524 – 39.35%	Roy Sakata; 2,833 – 13.05%		John Yap

=== Burnaby, New Westminster, and Coquitlam ===
Electoral district	Candidates				Incumbent
Electoral district	Liberal	NDP	Green	Other	Incumbent
Burnaby-Deer Lake	Karen Xiao Bao Wang; 6,491 – 35.54%	Anne Kang; 8,747 – 47.89%	Rick McGowan; 2,209 – 12.09%	Graham Bowers (Cons.); 589 – 3.22% Elias Ishak (Ind.); 229 – 1.25%	Kathy Corrigan†
Burnaby-Edmonds	Garrison Duke; 6,404 – 32.09%	Raj Chouhan; 10,827 – 54.25%	Valentine Wu; 2,728 – 13.67%		Raj Chouhan
Burnaby-Lougheed	Steve Darling; 8,391 – 36.91%	Katrina Chen; 10,911 – 48.06%	Joe Keithley; 3,127 – 13.77%	Sylvia Gung (Ind.); 145 – 0.64% Neeraj Murarka (Ltn.); 129 – 0.57%	Jane Shin†
Burnaby North	Richard T. Lee; 9,290 – 39.42%	Janet Routledge; 11,447 – 48.57%	Peter Hallschmid; 2,830 – 12.01%		Richard T. Lee
Coquitlam-Burke Mountain	Joan Isaacs; 10,388 – 44.28%	Jodie Wickens; 10,301 – 43.91%	Ian Donnelly Soutar; 2,771 – 11.81%		Jodie Wickens
Coquitlam-Maillardville	Steve Kim; 8,519 – 37.70%	Selina Mae Robinson; 11,438 – 50.61%	Nicola Eyton Spurling; 2,467 – 10.92%	Jesse Velay-Vitow (Ltn.); 175 – 0.77%	Selina Robinson
New Westminster	Lorraine Brett; 5,870 – 21.20%	Judy Darcy; 14,377 – 51.93%	Jonina Campbell; 6,939 – 25.07%	James Crosty (Social Credit); 298 – 1.08% Rex Brocki (Ltn.); 199 – 0.72%	Judy Darcy
Port Coquitlam	Susan Chambers; 7,582 – 30.05%	Mike Farnworth; 14,079 – 55.79%	Jason Hanley; 3,237 – 12.83%	Lewis Clarke Dahlby (Ltn.); 248 – 0.98% Billy Gibbons (Cascadia); 88 – 0.35%	Mike Farnworth
Port Moody-Coquitlam	Linda Reimer; 9,910 – 40.20%	Rick Glumac; 11,754 – 47.69%	Don Barthel; 2,985 – 12.11%		Linda Reimer

=== Vancouver ===
Electoral district	Candidates				Incumbent
Electoral district	Liberal	NDP	Green	Other	Incumbent
Vancouver-Fairview	Gabe Garfinkel; 9,436 – 31.85%	George Heyman; 16,035 – 54.12%	Louise Boutin; 4,007 – 13.52%	Joey Doyle (YPP); 149 – 0.50%	George Heyman
Vancouver-False Creek	Sam Sullivan; 10,370 – 42.16%	Morgane Oger; 9,955 – 40.47%	Bradley Darren Shende; 3,880 – 15.77%	Liz Jaluague (Ltn.); 213 – 0.87% James Filippelli (YPP); 91 – 0.37% Phillip James Ryan (Citizens First); 90 – 0.37%	Sam Sullivan
Vancouver-Fraserview	**Suzanne Anton**; 9,985 – 42.22%	George Chow; 11,487 – 48.57%	Eric Kolotyluk; 1,826 – 7.72%	Hiroshi Hyde (Ltn.); 179 – 0.76% Harpreet S. Bajwa (YPP); 174 – 0.74%	**Suzanne Anton**
Vancouver-Hastings	Jane Spitz; 5,160 – 21.56%	Shane Lee Simpson; 14,351 – 59.96%	David H.T. Wong; 4,222 – 17.64%	Kimball Mark Cariou (Comm.); 203 – 0.85%	Shane Simpson
Vancouver-Kensington	Kim Jee Chan Logan; 7,236 – 32.16%	Mable Elmore; 12,504 – 55.57%	Simon Alexander Rear; 2,580 – 11.47%	Ramanjit Kaur Dhillon (YPP); 181 – 0.80%	Mable Elmore
Vancouver-Kingsway	Trang Nguyen; 5,377 – 27.09%	Adrian Dix; 12,031 – 60.62%	Ellisa Calder; 1,848 – 9.31%	Charles Bae (Cons.); 504 – 2.54% Brette Mullins (YPP); 85 – 0.43%	Adrian Dix
Vancouver-Langara	Michael Lee; 10,047 – 47.46%	James Wang; 8,057 – 38.06%	Janet Rhoda Fraser; 2,894 – 13.67%	Surinder Singh Trehan (YPP); 172 – 0.81%	Moira Stilwell†
Vancouver-Mount Pleasant	Conny Lin; 3,917 – 16.03%	Melanie Mark; 15,962 – 65.31%	Jerry Kroll; 4,136 – 16.92%	Mike Hansen (Ind.); 212 – 0.87% Peter Marcus (Comm.); 142 – 0.58% Shai Joseph Mor (YPP); 72 – 0.29%	Melanie Mark
Vancouver-Point Grey	James Lombardi; 8,414 – 33.16%	David Robert Patrick Eby; 14,195 – 55.94%	Amanda Konkin; 2,604 – 10.26%	Brian Taylor (Ind.); 84 – 0.33% David Stall (YPP); 77 – 0.30%	David Eby
Vancouver-Quilchena	**Andrew Wilkinson**; 12,464 – 55.96%	Madeline Lalonde; 6,244 – 28.03%	Michael Barkusky; 3,301 – 14.82%	William Morrison (Ltn.); 265 – 1.19%	**Andrew Wilkinson**
Vancouver-West End	Nigel Elliott; 5,064 – 23.01%	Spencer Chandra Herbert; 13,420 – 60.97%	James Marshall; 3,059 – 13.90%	John Clarke (Ltn.); 352 – 1.60% Leon David Dunn (Ind.); 116 – 0.53%	Spencer Chandra Herbert

=== North Shore and Sunshine Coast ===
Electoral district	Candidates				Incumbent
Electoral district	Liberal	NDP	Green	Other	Incumbent
North Vancouver-Lonsdale	**Naomi Yamamoto**; 10,373 – 38.14%	Bowinn Ma; 12,361 – 45.45%	Richard Warrington; 4,148 – 15.25%	Donald N.S. Wilson (Ltn.); 316 – 1.16%	**Naomi Yamamoto**
North Vancouver-Seymour	Jane Ann Thornthwaite; 13,194 – 46.36%	Michael Rene Charrois; 9,808 – 34.47%	Joshua Johnson; 5,208 – 18.30%	Clayton Welwood (Ltn.); 247 – 0.87%	Jane Thornthwaite
Powell River-Sunshine Coast	Mathew Wilson; 6,602 – 24.53%	Nicholas Simons; 13,646 – 50.70%	Kim Darwin; 6,505 – 24.17%	Reuben Richards (Cascadia); 160 – 0.59%	Nicholas Simons
West Vancouver-Capilano	Ralph Sultan; 13,596 – 57.14%	Mehdi Russel; 5,622 – 23.63%	Michael Markwick; 4,575 – 19.23%		Ralph Sultan
West Vancouver-Sea to Sky	Jordan Sturdy; 10,449 – 43.08%	Michelle Livaja; 6,532 – 26.93%	Dana Moore Taylor; 6,947 – 28.64%	Michael Cambridge (Ltn.); 186 – 0.77% Tristan Andrew Galbraith (Ind.); 143 – 0.59%	Jordan Sturdy

=== Vancouver Island ===
Electoral district	Candidates				Incumbent
Electoral district	Liberal	NDP	Green	Other	Incumbent
Courtenay-Comox	Jim Benninger; 10,697 – 36.72%	Ronna-Rae Leonard; 10,886 – 37.36%	Ernie Sellentin; 5,351 – 18.37%	Leah Catherine McCulloch (Cons.); 2,201 – 7.55%	Don McRae† (Comox Valley)
Cowichan Valley	Steve Housser; 8,400 – 27.41%	Lori Lynn Iannidinardo; 9,603 – 31.34%	Sonia Furstenau; 11,475 – 37.45%	Ian Morrison (Ind.); 502 – 1.64% James Robert Anderson (Ltn.); 393 – 1.28% Samuel Lockhart (Ind.); 145 – 0.47% Eden Haythornthwaite (Ind.); 124 – 0.40%	Bill Routley†
Mid Island-Pacific Rim	Darren Frank DeLuca; 6,578 – 25.69%	Scott Kenneth Fraser; 12,556 – 49.04%	Alicia La Rue; 5,206 – 20.33%	Julian Fell (Cons.); 878 – 3.43% Robert Alexander Clarke (Ltn.); 298 – 1.16% Dan Cebuliak (Refed.); 86 – 0.34%	Scott Fraser (Alberni-Pacific Rim)
Nanaimo	Paris Gaudet; 8,911 – 32.54%	Leonard Krog; 12,746 – 46.54%	Kathleen Harris; 5,454 – 19.91%	Bill Walker (Ltn.); 277 – 1.01%	Leonard Krog
Nanaimo-North Cowichan	Alana DeLong; 7,380 – 28.20%	Doug Routley; 12,275 – 46.90%	Lia Marie Constance Versaevel; 6,244 – 23.86%	P. Anna Paddon (Ind.); 274 – 1.05%	Doug Routley
North Island	Dallas William Smith; 9,148 – 35.47%	Claire Felicity Trevena; 12,255 – 47.51%	Sue Moen; 3,846 – 14.91%	John M. Twigg (BC First); 543 – 2.11%	Claire Trevena
Parksville-Qualicum	**Michelle Stilwell**; 14,468 – 45.13%	Sue Powell; 9,189 – 28.66%	Glenn Sollitt; 8,157 – 25.44%	Terry Hand (Refed.); 245 – 0.76%	**Michelle Stilwell**

=== Greater Victoria ===
Electoral district	Candidates				Incumbent
Electoral district	Liberal	NDP	Green	Other	Incumbent
Esquimalt-Metchosin	Barb Desjardins; 7,055 – 27.61%	Mitzi Jayne Dean; 11,816 – 46.25%	Andy MacKinnon; 6,339 – 24.81%	Josh Steffler (Ltn.); 171 – 0.67% Delmar Martay (Ind.); 102 – 0.40% Tyson Riel Strandlund (Comm.); 65 – 0.25%	Maurine Karagianis† (Esquimalt-Royal Roads)
Langford-Juan de Fuca	Cathy Noel; 6,544 – 26.11%	John Horgan; 13,224 – 52.75%	Brendan Ralfs; 4,795 – 19.13%	Scott Burton (Ltn.); 262 – 1.05% Willie Nelson (VIP); 242 – 0.97%	John Horgan (Juan de Fuca)
Oak Bay-Gordon Head	Alex Dutton; 6,952 – 23.77%	Bryce Casavant; 6,912 – 23.63%	Andrew John Weaver; 15,257 – 52.17%	Jin Dong Yang-Riley (VIP); 67 – 0.23% Xaanja Ganja Free (4BC); 58 – 0.20%	Andrew Weaver
Saanich North and the Islands	Stephen P. Roberts; 9,321 – 26.46%	Gary Holman; 10,764 – 30.56%	Adam Olsen; 14,775 – 41.95%	Jordan Templeman (Ind); 364 – 1.03%	Gary Holman
Saanich South	David Calder; 8,716 – 31.05%	Lana Popham; 11,912 – 42.46%	Mark Neufeld; 7,129 – 25.39%	Andrew Paul McLean (Ltn.); 177 – 0.63% Richard Percival Pattee (VIP); 130 – 0.46%	Lana Popham
Victoria-Beacon Hill	Karen Bill; 4,689 – 15.49%	Carole James; 16,057 – 53.05%	Kalen Harris; 9,194 – 30.38%	Art Lowe (Ltn.); 190 – 0.63% Jordan Reichert (Ind.); 102 – 0.34% David Shebib (Ind.); 35 – 0.12%	Carole James
Victoria-Swan Lake	Stacey Piercey; 4,005 – 15.87%	Rob Fleming; 13,531 – 53.62%	Christopher Alan Maxwell; 7,491 – 29.69%	David Costigane (VIP); 207 – 0.82%	Rob Fleming
