= List of British Columbia provincial electoral districts (2017–2024) =

Map of the 87 current provincial electoral districts used in the 2020 British Columbia general election. Click to expand.

This is a list of the 87 provincial electoral districts (also informally known as ridings in Canadian English) of British Columbia, Canada, as defined by the 2015 electoral redistribution which first came into effect for the 2017 British Columbia general election. They replaced the previous set of districts defined in 2008.

These districts were abolished upon the call of the 2024 British Columbia general election, when they were replaced by a new set of districts defined in 2021.

Electoral districts are constituencies that elect MLAs to the Legislative Assembly of British Columbia every election.

- Abbotsford-Mission
- Abbotsford South
- Abbotsford West
- Boundary-Similkameen
- Burnaby-Deer Lake
- Burnaby-Edmonds
- Burnaby-Lougheed
- Burnaby North
- Cariboo-Chilcotin
- Cariboo North
- Chilliwack
- Chilliwack-Kent
- Columbia River-Revelstoke
- Coquitlam-Burke Mountain
- Coquitlam-Maillardville
- Courtenay-Comox
- Cowichan Valley
- Delta North
- Delta South
- Esquimalt-Metchosin
- Fraser-Nicola
- Kamloops-North Thompson
- Kamloops-South Thompson
- Kelowna-Lake Country
- Kelowna-Mission
- Kelowna West
- Kootenay East
- Kootenay West
- Langford-Juan de Fuca
- Langley
- Langley East
- Maple Ridge-Mission
- Maple Ridge-Pitt Meadows
- Mid Island-Pacific Rim
- Nanaimo
- Nanaimo-North Cowichan
- Nechako Lakes
- Nelson-Creston
- New Westminster
- North Coast
- North Island
- North Vancouver-Lonsdale
- North Vancouver-Seymour
- Oak Bay-Gordon Head
- Parksville-Qualicum
- Peace River North
- Peace River South
- Penticton
- Port Coquitlam
- Port Moody-Coquitlam
- Powell River-Sunshine Coast
- Prince George-Mackenzie
- Prince George-Valemount
- Richmond North Centre
- Richmond-Queensborough
- Richmond South Centre
- Richmond-Steveston
- Saanich North and the Islands
- Saanich South
- Shuswap
- Skeena
- Stikine
- Surrey-Cloverdale
- Surrey-Fleetwood
- Surrey-Green Timbers
- Surrey-Guildford
- Surrey-Newton
- Surrey-Panorama
- Surrey South
- Surrey-Whalley
- Surrey-White Rock
- Vancouver-Fairview
- Vancouver-False Creek
- Vancouver-Fraserview
- Vancouver-Hastings
- Vancouver-Kensington
- Vancouver-Kingsway
- Vancouver-Langara
- Vancouver-Mount Pleasant
- Vancouver-Point Grey
- Vancouver-Quilchena
- Vancouver-West End
- Vernon-Monashee
- Victoria-Beacon Hill
- Victoria-Swan Lake
- West Vancouver-Capilano
- West Vancouver-Sea to Sky

== See also ==
- List of British Columbia provincial electoral districts
- Canadian provincial electoral districts
