= List of British Columbia provincial electoral districts (2009–2017) =

This is a list of British Columbia's 85 provincial electoral districts (also colloquially known as ridings in Canadian English) as defined by the 2008 British Columbia electoral redistribution, which came into effect for the 2009 election. This set of electoral boundaries was abolished upon the call of the 2017 election.

Electoral districts are constituencies that elect MLAs to the Legislative Assembly of British Columbia every election.

- Abbotsford-Mission
- Abbotsford South
- Abbotsford West
- Alberni-Pacific Rim
- Boundary-Similkameen
- Burnaby-Deer Lake
- Burnaby-Edmonds
- Burnaby-Lougheed
- Burnaby North
- Cariboo-Chilcotin
- Cariboo North
- Chilliwack
- Chilliwack-Hope
- Columbia River-Revelstoke
- Comox Valley
- Coquitlam-Burke Mountain
- Coquitlam-Maillardville
- Cowichan Valley
- Delta North
- Delta South
- Esquimalt-Royal Roads
- Fort Langley-Aldergrove
- Fraser-Nicola
- Juan de Fuca
- Kamloops-North Thompson
- Kamloops-South Thompson
- Kelowna-Lake Country
- Kelowna-Mission
- Kootenay East
- Kootenay West
- Langley
- Maple Ridge-Mission
- Maple Ridge-Pitt Meadows
- Nanaimo
- Nanaimo-North Cowichan
- Nechako Lakes
- Nelson-Creston
- New Westminster
- North Coast
- North Island
- North Vancouver-Lonsdale
- North Vancouver-Seymour
- Oak Bay-Gordon Head
- Parksville-Qualicum
- Peace River North
- Peace River South
- Penticton
- Port Coquitlam
- Port Moody-Coquitlam
- Powell River-Sunshine Coast
- Prince George-Mackenzie
- Prince George-Valemount
- Richmond Centre
- Richmond East
- Richmond-Steveston
- Saanich North and the Islands
- Saanich South
- Shuswap
- Skeena
- Stikine
- Surrey-Cloverdale
- Surrey-Fleetwood
- Surrey-Green Timbers
- Surrey-Newton
- Surrey-Panorama
- Surrey-Tynehead
- Surrey-Whalley
- Surrey-White Rock
- Vancouver-Fairview
- Vancouver-False Creek
- Vancouver-Fraserview
- Vancouver-Hastings
- Vancouver-Kensington
- Vancouver-Kingsway
- Vancouver-Langara
- Vancouver-Mount Pleasant
- Vancouver-Point Grey
- Vancouver-Quilchena
- Vancouver-West End
- Vernon-Monashee
- Victoria-Beacon Hill
- Victoria-Swan Lake
- West Vancouver-Capilano
- West Vancouver-Sea to Sky
- Westside-Kelowna

== See also ==
- List of British Columbia provincial electoral districts
- Canadian provincial electoral districts
