= Surrey-Tynehead =

Defunct provincial electoral district in British Columbia, Canada

British Columbia electoral district

Defunct provincial electoral district
- Legislature: Legislative Assembly of British Columbia
- District created: 1999
- District abolished: 2015
- First contested: 2001
- Last contested: 2013

Demographics
- Census division: Metro Vancouver
- Census subdivision: Surrey

Surrey-Tynehead was a provincial electoral district for the Legislative Assembly of British Columbia, Canada. The electoral district, firstly represented by Dave Hayer (2001–2013), then Amrik Virk (2013–2017). After the British Columbia electoral redistribution, 2015 the riding became Surrey-Guildford

== Demographics historic ==
Population, 2001	59,081
Population change, 1996–2001	24.3%
Area (km^{2})	70.81
Population density (people per km^{2})	834

== History ==
The riding was created for the 2001 election from parts of Surrey-Cloverdale, Surrey-Whalley and Surrey-Green Timbers. It was abolished in the 2015 redistribution into Surrey-Guildford, Surrey-Cloverdale and Surrey-Fleetwood.

=== 1999 redistribution ===
Changes from Surrey-Cloverdale to Surrey-Tynehead include:

- Inclusion of all of Surrey-Tynehead, except for portion from Surrey-Green Timbers

Changes from Surrey-Green Timbers to Surrey-Tynehead include:

- Inclusion of the quarter sections between 104th and 96th Avenue, and 152nd and 160th Street

== Members of the Legislative Assembly ==
Surrey-Tynehead
Assembly	Years	Member	Party
Surrey-Cloverdale, Surrey-Guildford, and Surrey-Whalley prior to 2001
37th	2001–2005	Dave Hayer	Liberal
38th	2005–2009	Dave Hayer	Liberal
39th	2009–2013	Dave Hayer	Liberal
40th	2013–2017	Amrik Virk	Liberal
Surrey-Cloverdale, Surrey-Fleetwood, and Surrey-Guildford after 2017

== Election results ==
2013 British Columbia general election
Party	Candidate	Votes	%	
Liberal	Amrik Virk	9,172	48.15	-4.35
New Democratic	Avtar Bains	7,539	39.58	-3.65
Conservative	Barry J. Sikora	2,040	10.71	–
Vision	Sukhi Gill	298	1.56	–
Total valid votes		19,049	100.00	
Total rejected ballots		176	0.92	
Turnout		19,225	52.13	
Source: Elections BC

BC General Election 2009 Surrey-Tynehead
Party	Candidate	Votes	%	±%
Liberal	Dave Hayer	8,814	52.50%	+1.13%
NDP	Pat Zanon	7,257	43.23%	+2.87%
Green	Gerald Singh	717	4.27%	-0.40%
Total		16,788	100.00%	

2005 British Columbia general election
Party	Candidate	Votes	%	±%
Liberal	Dave Hayer	12,052	51.37	-9.58
New Democratic	Barry Bell	9,469	40.36	+24.64
Green	Sean Orr	1,095	4.67%	-4.67
Marijuana	Donald Joseph Briere	243	1.04	-0.28
Independent	Summer Davis	380	1.62	–
Independent	Gary Alan Hoffman	223	0.95	–
Total valid votes		23,462	100.00%	–
Liberal hold		Swing		–17.11

BC General Election 2001: Surrey-Tynehead
Party	Candidate	Votes	%	±	Expenditures
Liberal	Dave Hayer	12,252	60.95%		$52,615
NDP	Barry Bell	3,159	15.72%		$2,502
Green	Joel Macht	1,876	9.33%	–	$305
Unity	Bill Stilwell	1,234	6.14%		$2,831
Independent	Marilyn Collins	880	4.38%		$9,970
Marijuana	Donald Joseph Briere	385	1.92%		$821
Reform	Enoch Ephraimson	265	1.31%		$3,452
Independent	Mandir Benipal	50	0.25%		$1,400
Total valid votes		20,101	100.00%		
Total rejected ballots		95	0.47%		
Turnout		20,196	72.25%		

== See also ==
- List of British Columbia provincial electoral districts
- Canadian provincial electoral districts
