= British Columbia Electoral Boundaries Commission =

The British Columbia Electoral Boundaries Commission is an independent commission required to review and determine electoral district boundaries in the province of British Columbia, Canada. The lieutenant governor of British Columbia is required by the Electoral Boundaries Commission Act to a call a commission every two elections, consisting of a judge or a retired judge, the provincial chief electoral officer, and another person (who may not be a member of the Legislative Assembly).

Current MLAs were elected to electoral districts created by the 2015 redistribution. The 43rd British Columbia General Election, scheduled for 2024, will be held under new boundaries. The government appointed commissioners in October 2021. The final report was completed April 3, 2023, and the Legislative Assembly approved the Electoral Districts Act on April 25. At the time of the next election, the number of seats in the Legislative Assembly will increase from 87 to 93. The six new seats are in Vancouver, Burnaby, Surrey, Langley, Langford, and Kelowna.
