= Surrey North =

Surrey North may refer to:

- Surrey North (federal electoral district), a federal electoral district in British Columbia, Canada, from 1988 to 2015
- Surrey North (provincial electoral district), a provincial electoral district in British Columbia, Canada, from 2024 to present
