= 2015 British Columbia electoral redistribution =

An electoral redistribution in British Columbia was undertaken by the BC Electoral Boundaries Commission beginning in 2014 and was formalized by the passage of Bill 42, the 2015 Electoral Districts Act, during the 40th British Columbia Parliament. The act came into effect on November 17, 2015. The redistribution added two seats to the previous total, increasing the number of MLAs in the province from 85 to 87. The electoral boundaries came into effect for the 2017 election. The next resdistribution occurred in 2021, before the 2024 provincial election.

== Changes ==
=== No change (36) ===
- Burnaby-Deer Lake
- Burnaby-Edmonds
- Cowichan Valley
- Delta North
- Delta South
- Kamloops-North Thompson
- Kelowna-Lake Country
- Kelowna-Mission
- Kootenay West
- Maple Ridge-Mission
- Maple Ridge-Pitt Meadows
- Nechako Lakes
- Nelson-Creston
- North Coast
- North Island
- Peace River North
- Peace River South
- Penticton
- Port Coquitlam
- Powell River-Sunshine Coast
- Saanich North and the Islands
- Skeena
- Shuswap
- Stikine
- Vancouver-Fairview
- Vancouver-Fraserview
- Vancouver-Hastings
- Vancouver-Kensington
- Vancouver-Kingsway
- Vancouver-Langara
- Vancouver-Mount Pleasant
- Vancouver-Point Grey
- Vancouver-Quilchena
- Vernon-Monashee
- Victoria-Swan Lake
- West Vancouver-Capilano

=== Adjusted (39) ===
- Abbotsford-Mission
- Abbotsford South
- Abbotsford West
- Boundary-Similkameen
- Burnaby-Lougheed
- Burnaby North
- Cariboo-Chilcotin
- Cariboo North
- Chilliwack
- Columbia River-Revelstoke
- Coquitlam-Burke Mountain
- Coquitlam-Maillardville
- Fraser-Nicola
- Kamloops-South Thompson
- Kootenay East
- Langley
- Nanaimo
- Nanaimo-North Cowichan
- New Westminster
- North Vancouver-Lonsdale
- North Vancouver-Seymour
- Oak Bay-Gordon Head
- Parksville-Qualicum
- Port Moody-Coquitlam
- Prince George-Mackenzie
- Prince George-Valemount
- Richmond-Steveston
- Saanich South
- Surrey-Cloverdale
- Surrey-Fleetwood
- Surrey-Green Timbers
- Surrey-Newton
- Surrey-Panorama
- Surrey-Whalley
- Surrey-White Rock
- Vancouver-False Creek
- Vancouver-West End
- Victoria-Beacon Hill
- West Vancouver-Sea to Sky

=== Minor adjustment with name change (1) ===
- Kelowna West (was "Westside-Kelowna")

=== Replaced (9) ===
(primary successor riding is shown)

- Alberni-Pacific Rim → Mid Island-Pacific Rim
- Chilliwack-Hope → Chilliwack-Kent
- Comox Valley → Courtenay-Comox
- Esquimalt-Royal Roads → Esquimalt-Metchosin
- Fort Langley-Aldergrove → Langley East
- Juan de Fuca → Langford-Juan de Fuca
- Richmond Centre → Richmond North Centre
- Richmond East → Richmond-Queensborough
- Surrey-Tynehead → Surrey-Guildford

=== New ridings (2) ===
- Richmond South Centre
- Surrey South

== See also ==
- British Columbia electoral redistribution, 2008
