= Dave Hayer =

Canadian politician (born 1958)

Member of the British Columbia Legislative Assembly for Surrey-Tynehead
- In office 16 May 2001 – 14 May 2013
- Preceded by: Riding Established
- Succeeded by: Amrik Virk

Personal details
- Born: 1958 (age 67–68)
- Party: Conservative
- Other political affiliations: BC Liberal (provincial)
- Occupation: Banker, Politician

Dave Sukhdip Singh Hayer (born 1958) is a former Indo-Canadian politician for the province of British Columbia. He served as member of the Legislative Assembly (MLA) for Surrey-Tynehead from 2001 to 2013. Hayer is the son of assassinated journalist Tara Singh Hayer.

== Education ==
Hayer earned a Bachelor of Arts degree in business administration from Simon Fraser University (1979–1982) and completed a Strategic Leadership Certificate from the University of British Columbia Sauder School of Business, Executive Management (2013–2014). He also attended Douglas College from 1977 to 1979 and completed the Tax Course at British Columbia Institute of Technology (BCIT).

== Business and community involvement ==
Hayer served as the general manager of the Canadian Accounting Aggregates Public Accountants from 1983 to 1988, following which he joined the Indo-Canadian Times. Before his election to public office, Hayer was a Surrey businessperson, assistant publisher of the Indo-Canadian Times, Kwantlen University College Governor, and real estate agent, and worked in the restaurant, newspaper, construction, transportation, and forestry industries. In addition, Hayer has worked as a labourer in a steel factory and during his teenage years worked on farms, in greenhouses, and in a grocery store, and also delivered both the Sun and Province newspapers.

Hayer's memberships have included the Rotary Club of Surrey, the Cloverdale Royal Canadian Legion, the Surrey Board of Trade, the Cloverdale District Chamber of Commerce, the Greater Langley Chamber of Commerce, the Langley Salvation Army Gateway of Hope, the Cloverdale Community Association, and the Cloverdale Rodeo & Exhibition Association. He is also a member of Simon Fraser University's India Advisory Council, which supports SFU's strategic initiatives in India and engagement with BC's Indo-Canadian diaspora.

In July 2019, Hayer and his wife, Isabelle Martinez Hayer, were elected as co-presidents of the Rotary Club of Surrey. Both took the oath from Brad Whittaker, Governor of the Rotary International District 5050.

In October 2018, Hayer was elected vice president of the Association of Former MLAs of BC (formerly Association of Ex-MLAs of B.C.) a non-partisan association of former MLAs founded in 1987.

Previous community and business involvements include the Rotary Club of Surrey president (1999–2000); Surrey Community Crime Prevention Society president (1995–96); Surrey Chamber of Commerce president (1996–97); Surrey Board of Trade Governor since 1997; BC Chamber of Commerce District director (1999–2001) for Langley to Vancouver region; Vancouver Board of Trade Small Business Council member (1995–2000); Indo-Canadian Business Association vice-president (1993–2000); Ethnic Press Association of BC director & vice-president (1991–99); City of Surrey Economic Development Strategy Advisory Committee member (1995–2000); South Fraser Child Development Centre Christmas Party chair (1988–2001); and Surrey & White Rock Home Support Association director (1994–95). As well, Hayer created the Surrey Police Officer of the Year awards and initiated the building of the Surrey Chamber of Commerce (now Surrey Board of Trade) building.

Hayer currently works with the Dominion Lending Centres. He previously worked with the Canadian Imperial Bank of Commerce (CIBC) as a mortgage advisor.

== Politics ==
After defeating Doug McCallum, the mayor of Surrey, for the BC Liberal party nomination, Hayer competed for and was elected as the first member of the Legislative Assembly of British Columbia for the riding of Surrey-Tynehead. Hayer was first elected in the 2001 provincial general election and was re-elected in 2005 and 2009.

Hayer served as the Parliamentary Secretary for Multiculturalism and Immigration from 2005 to 2011. He was noted as a voice for moderate Sikhs in Greater Vancouver and as a consistent critic of terrorism and Sikh extremism. In 2010, an official with the Dashmesh Darbar Gurdwara (Sikh temple) that is extremely vocal in their support for the Khalistani separatist movement, advised Hayer and moderate Federal Sikh politician Ujjal Dosanjh that their attendance at an annual Sikh religious parade would be at their own risk; this prompted a police investigation, and prompted then-Premier Gordon Campbell to ask temple officials to apologize and Surrey mayor Dianne Watts to consider a review of the status of the following year's parade.

On 7 July 2012, Hayer announced that he would not seek re-election in the May 2013 provincial election. "Part of that decision was that if re-elected as MLA in May 2013, and then left to run as an MP in 2015, it would have triggered an expensive by-election which would be costly for my constituents & that would have been the wrong thing to do for my community," noted Hayer. "Dave Hayer announces run for new federal riding".

In 2013, Hayer criticized the Liberal government's Quick Wins ethnic outreach scandal.

Hayer's attempt to be nominated by the Conservative Party of Canada for the 2015 federal election in the riding of Cloverdale—Langley City was defeated in November 2014 by Dean Drysdale.

On 19 July 2021, Hayer announced he had been nominated by the Conservative Party of Canada for the 2021 Canadian federal election in the riding of Fleetwood—Port Kells. During his announcement, he said, "We need leadership at the federal level once again to secure the future and get the economy back on track post-pandemic". Hayer's campaign will focus on getting the federal debt under control and jobs.

== Awards and recognition ==
In 2000, Hayer and his wife accepted an award for his late father Tara Singh Hayer as one of the International Press Institute's 50 World Press Freedom Heroes of the past 50 years. An award for Tara Singh Hayer as a World Press Freedom Hero presented by US Senator Ted Kennedy in Boston was accepted by Dave & Isabelle Martinez Hayer in May 2000 on behalf of the Hayer family.

In 2002, Hayer was a recipient of the Queen Elizabeth II Golden Jubilee Medal.

In 2007, Hayer received a Pravasi Bharatiya Samman award from the Government of India, which is given annually to people of Indian heritage no longer living in India, who have achieved excellence in their chosen fields of endeavour. The award was presented by A. P. J. Abdul Kalam, the President of India, at a ceremony in New Delhi, India for Hayer's "active leadership in the community, his contributions to public service and for his achievements in government." Hayer was the second Canadian to be presented with this honour.

In 2008, Hayer was included by the Vancouver Sun in its list of the 100 topmost influential Canadians of South Asian descent making a difference in BC.

On 10 February 2013, Hayer was presented with a Diamond Jubilee Medal by the Canadian Coalition Against Terror (C-CAT) for his contributions to public policy on terrorism issues in Canada.

In 2017, Hayer was honoured with the presentation of his 3rd Paul Harris Award on 10 July 2017, by Surrey Rotary Officers.

Hayer was awarded the Queen Elizabeth II Platinum Jubilee Medal on 11 October 2022, for his service to the community.

== Personal life ==
Hayer has lived in Surrey since 1972. He married Isabelle Martinez Hayer in 1981; they have four children.
