= Garry Thind =

Canadian politician

Garry Thind MLA

Member of the British Columbia Legislative Assembly for Surrey-Guildford
- Incumbent
- Assumed office October 24, 2026
- Preceded by: Garry Begg

Personal details
- Party: Conservative (provincial)
- Other political affiliations: Surrey First Education (municipal); BC Liberal (2020)
- Website: website

Gurpreet Singh Thind MLA is a Canadian politician who is the Member of the British Columbia Legislative Assembly for Surrey-Guildford since the 2026 British Columbia general election. He has served on the Surrey Board of Education. He was previously the BC Liberal candidate for Surrey-Fleetwood in 2020.

== Electoral record ==
2026 British Columbia general election: Surrey-Guildford
Party	Candidate	Votes	%	±%	Expenditures
Conservative	Garry Thind	8,469	50.34		
New Democratic	Garry Begg	6,905	41.04		
Green	Jodi Murphy	1,079	6.41		
Unaffiliated (Note: Endorsed by OneBC but listed as unaffiliated due to "paperwork technicalities")	James Yaroshuk	327	1.94	—	
Total valid votes		16,780	99.74		
Total rejected ballots		43	0.26		
Turnout		16,823			
Registered voters					
Conservative gain from New Democratic		Swing		+4.82	
Source: Elections BC

2020 British Columbia general election: Surrey-Fleetwood
Party	Candidate	Votes	%	±%	Expenditures
New Democratic	Jagrup Brar	11,457	60.93	+7.51	$61,844.02
Liberal	Garry Thind	5,776	30.72	−5.03	$62,863.75
Green	Dean McGee	1,571	8.35	−2.48	$702.09
Total valid votes		18,804	100.00	–	
Total rejected ballots		138	0.73	−0.04	
Turnout		18,942	50.77	−8.75	
Registered voters		37,309			
Source: Elections BC
