= Sue Hammell =

Canadian politician (born 1945)

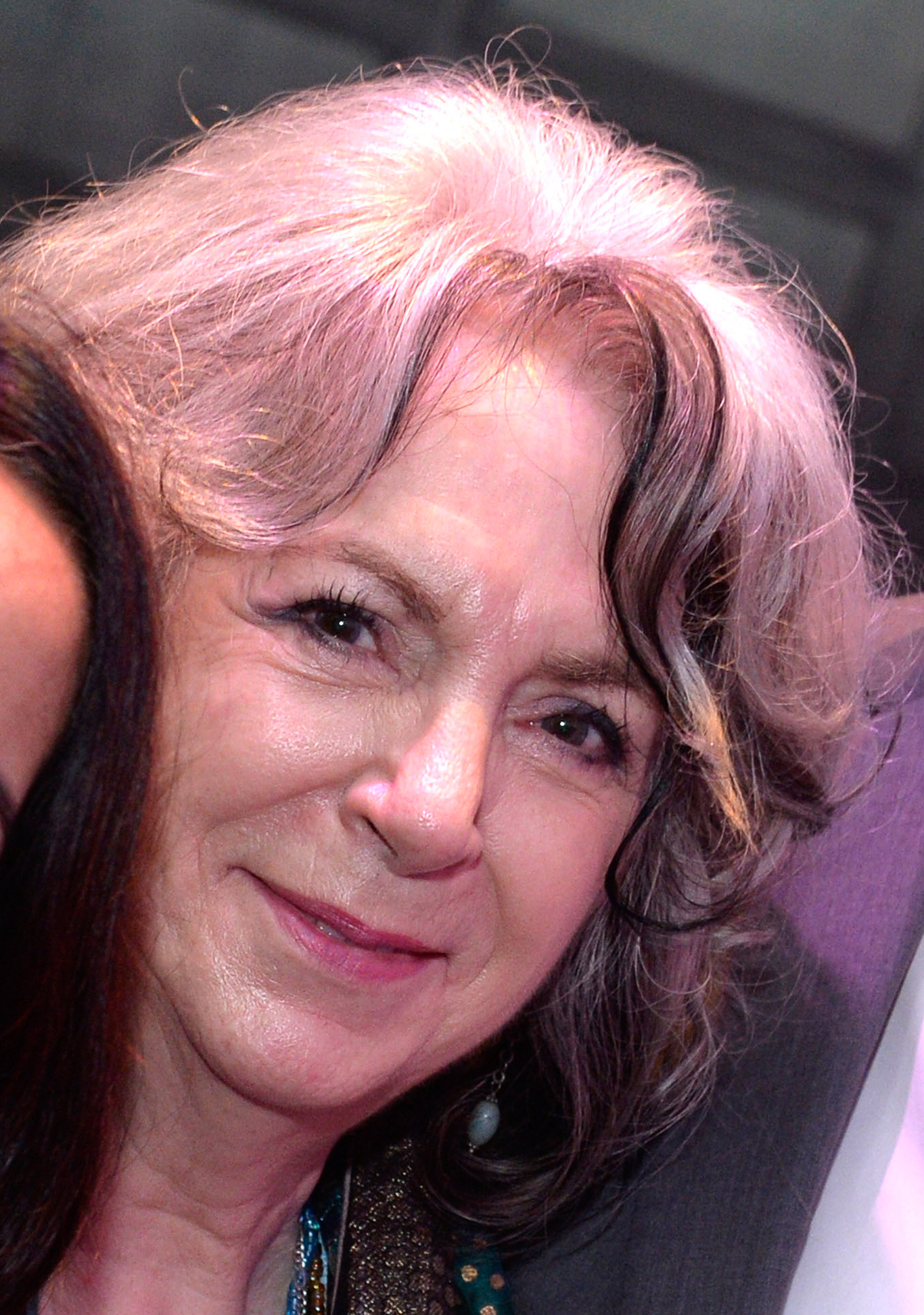
- Hammell in 2017

Member of the British Columbia Legislative Assembly for Surrey-Green Timbers
- In office May 17, 2005 – May 9, 2017
- Preceded by: Brenda Locke
- Succeeded by: Rachna Singh
- In office October 17, 1991 – May 16, 2001
- Preceded by: Riding Established
- Succeeded by: Brenda Locke

Personal details
- Born: June 18, 1945 (age 81) Vancouver, British Columbia, Canada
- Party: New Democratic
- Spouse: John Pollard
- Education: University of British Columbia

Sue Hammell (born June 18, 1945) is a Canadian politician who was the Member of the Legislative Assembly for Surrey-Green Timbers in the province of British Columbia from 1991 to 2001, and from 2005 to 2017. A member of the British Columbia New Democratic Party (BC NDP), she served in several cabinet posts under Premiers Mike Harcourt, Glen Clark and Ujjal Dosanjh.

== Background ==
Hammell was born in Vancouver, and grew up on Sea Island in Richmond. She attended the University of British Columbia, from which she received a bachelor of arts degree in education. She worked as a teacher in Verdun, Quebec and Courtenay, British Columbia before moving to Surrey, settling in the Green Timbers area in 1990 with her husband. Before entering provincial politics, she was the executive assistant to the mayor of Surrey. She participated in the founding of the Minerva Foundation for B.C. Women in 1999.

She and her husband John Pollard (d. 2019) had one adult daughter, named Sage.

== Political career ==
She was elected to the Legislative Assembly for the riding of Surrey-Green Timbers in the 1991 election, and was named to the cabinet by Premier Mike Harcourt in October 1995, serving as Minister of Housing, Recreation and Consumer Services. After Glen Clark assumed the premiership in February 1996, Hammell was appointed Minister for Women's Equality. She was re-elected in the May 1996 provincial election, and retained her role in the cabinet. With Clark embroiled in scandal, Hammell resigned her cabinet post in July 1999, stating she could not "in good conscience" stay on in the executive council.

She re-entered the cabinet in February 2000 under new Premier Ujjal Dosanjh, serving as Minister of Multiculturalism and Immigration, and Minister Responsible for the Public Service. With the NDP trailing in the polls, Hammell was defeated in the 2001 election by BC Liberal candidate Brenda Locke. While out of the legislature, she worked as executive director for Surrey Aboriginal Society in 2002.

She then returned to the Assembly by winning back the Surrey-Green Timbers seat from Locke in the 2005 election. She was handily re-elected in 2009 with more than 72% of the vote, and kept her seat in the 2013 election. She served as the NDP's deputy house leader and critic for women's issues, child care and early learning in the 39th Parliament, and as critic for mental health and addictions in the 40th Parliament.

She announced in January 2017 that she would not run in that May's election, citing the need to care for her ailing husband; she served out the remainder of her term. In the same year she co-founded consulting firm Composite Public Affairs, and registered as a lobbyist.

== Election results ==
2013 British Columbia general election: Surrey-Green Timbers
Party	Candidate	Votes	%
New Democratic	Sue Hammell	9386	58.06
Liberal	Amrik Tung	5581	34.52
Green	Richard Hosein	655	4.05
Conservative	Lisa Maharaj	444	2.75
Vision	Harjit Singh Heir	101	0.62
Total valid votes		16167	100.00
Total rejected ballots		194	1.19
Turnout		16361	52.32
Source: Elections BC

2009 British Columbia general election: Surrey-Green Timbers
Party	Candidate	Votes	%	±%
New Democratic	Sue Hammell	10,965	72.73	+11.91
Liberal	Rani Mangat	3,624	24.03	−8.51
Green	Dan Kashagama	488	3.24	−1.20
Total		15,077	100.00	

2005 British Columbia general election: Surrey-Green Timbers
Party	Candidate	Votes	%	±%
New Democratic	Sue Hammell	10,836	60.82	+24.51
Liberal	Brenda Locke	5,619	31.54	−17.41
Green	Sebastian Sajda	791	4.44	–
Marijuana	Amanda Boggan	225	1.26	−2.39
Emerged Democracy	Rob Norberg	151	0.85	–
Democratic Reform	Ravi Chand	142	0.80	–
Communist	Harjit Singh Daudharia	52	0.29	+0.38
Total		17,816	100.00	

B.C. General Election 2001: Surrey-Green Timbers
Party	Candidate	Votes	%	±	Expenditures
Liberal	Brenda Locke	7,539	48.95%	+15.16%	$46,658
NDP	Sue Hammell	5,592	36.31%	-13.80%	$37,237
Unity	C. Lewis Robinson	1,067	6.93%	n/a	$7,196
Marijuana	Dennis Kalsi	561	3.65%	n/a	$394
Reform	Jim Paterson	538	3.49%	-2.28%	$3,277
Communist	Harjit Singh Daudharia	103	0.67%	+0.37%	$332
Total valid votes		15,400	100.00%		
Total rejected ballots		151	0.98%		
Turnout		15,551	66.77%		

B.C. General Election 1996: Surrey-Green Timbers
Party	Candidate	Votes	%	±	Expenditures
NDP	Sue Hammell	10,278	50.11%	+3.95%	$36,931
Liberal	Bill Phelps	6,930	33.79%	+0.47%	$39,334
Reform	Dominic Darmanin	1,183	5.77%	n/a	$7,188
Progressive Democrat	Gerard Baisch	1,150	5.61%	n/a	
Family Coalition	Gerhard Herwig	255	1.24%	n/a	$2,120
Green	Romeo De La Pena	228	1.11%	+0.64%	$865
Progressive Conservative	Cliff Blair	179	0.87%	n/a	
Social Credit	Victoria Kedzierski	114	0.56%	-19.29%	$1,048
Independent	Don Knight	101	0.49%	n/a	$1,245
Communist	George Gidora	62	0.30%	n/a	$503
Natural Law	Ross Ranger	32	0.16%	n/a	$110
Total valid votes		20,512	100.00%		
Total rejected ballots		254	1.22%		
Turnout		20,766	69.40%		

B.C. General Election 1991: Surrey-Green Timbers
Party	Candidate	Votes	%	±	Expenditures
NDP	Sue Hammell	8,708	46.16%	n/a	$32,800
Liberal	Archibald McMurchy	6,324	33.52%	n/a	$4,777
Social Credit	Russ Burtnick	3,744	19.85%	n/a	$35,747
Green	Gjhrard Baisch	89	0.47%	n/a	
Total valid votes		18,865	100.00%		
Total rejected ballots		512	2.64%		
Turnout		19,377	72.04%		

== Cabinet positions ==
British Columbia provincial government of Ujjal Dosanjh
Cabinet posts (2)
Predecessor	Office	Successor
Ujjal Dosanjh	Minister of Multiculturalism & Immigration; February 29, 2000–June 5, 2001	Gulzar Cheema
Helmut Giesbrecht	Minister Responsible for the Public Service; February 29, 2000–June 5, 2001	Ministry Abolished
British Columbia provincial government of Glen Clark
Cabinet post (1)
Predecessor	Office	Successor
Penny Priddy	Minister for Women's Equality; February 28, 1996–July 19, 1999	Jenny Kwan
British Columbia provincial government of Mike Harcourt
Cabinet post (1)
Predecessor	Office	Successor
Joan Smallwood	Minister of Housing, Recreation and Consumer Services; October 26, 1995–February 22, 1996	Lois Boone
