= Jas Johal =

Canadian politician

Minister for Technology, Innovation and Citizens' Services of British Columbia
- In office June 12, 2017 – July 18, 2017
- Premier: Christy Clark
- Preceded by: Amrik Virk
- Succeeded by: Jinny Sims (Citizens' Services); Bruce Ralston (Technology)

Member of the British Columbia Legislative Assembly for Richmond-Queensborough
- In office May 9, 2017 – September 21, 2020
- Preceded by: new district
- Succeeded by: Aman Singh

Personal details
- Born: 1969 or 1970 (age 56) Jalandhar, Punjab, India
- Party: BC Liberal
- Education: British Columbia Institute of Technology
- Profession: Journalist

Jas Johal is a Canadian politician and media personality. He served as Member of the Legislative Assembly (MLA) of British Columbia for the electoral district of Richmond-Queensborough in the 41st Parliament of British Columbia (2017-2020), as part of the British Columbia Liberal Party caucus.

== Early life and career ==
Born in Jalandhar, Punjab, India, Johal moved to British Columbia at the age of two with his family, growing up in the interior city of Williams Lake before resettling in Greater Vancouver. After graduating from the British Columbia Institute of Technology with a diploma in communications, he began his broadcasting career at Vancouver radio station CKNW AM980 in 1991, then joined BCTV (now Global BC) in 1994, eventually becoming a senior reporter with the station. He moved over to Global's national news division in 2005 as its BC correspondent, then became the network's Asia bureau chief in 2008, based in Beijing and New Delhi.

After leaving Global in 2014, he served as director of communications for the BC LNG Alliance, a trade group for the province's liquefied natural gas export industry, until 2016.

== Politics ==
He was approached by the British Columbia Liberal Party to contest the new riding of Richmond-Queensborough in the 2017 provincial election, in which he defeated British Columbia New Democratic Party (NDP) candidate Aman Singh by 134 votes to become the riding's MLA. On June 12, 2017, he was named the Minister of Technology, Innovation and Citizens' Services, serving in that role for just over a month until the new NDP government was sworn in following the defeat of the Liberal minority government in a non-confidence motion.

For the remainder of the 41st Parliament, Johal served as the Official Opposition critic for Economic Development, Competitiveness, Trade and Technology. He sponsored one private member bill, the Reducing Waste Act (Bill M-206), on March 14, 2018, which sought to prohibit the retail sale of single-use beverage pods unless they were fully compostable.

Johal faced Aman Singh once again in the 2020 provincial election, this time losing by 1,678 votes. Following his defeat, he rejoined CKNW as host of The Jas Johal Show in August 2021.

== Electoral record ==
2020 British Columbia general election: Richmond-Queensborough
Party	Candidate	Votes	%	±%	Expenditures
New Democratic	Aman Singh	9,406	47.65	+6.90	$50,855.54
Liberal	Jas Johal	7,728	39.15	−2.28	$59,892.51
Green	Earl Einarson	1,496	7.58	−5.14	$2,311.39
Conservative	Kay Hale	1,108	5.61	+2.11	$6,570.00
Total valid votes		19,738	100.00	–	
Total rejected ballots		154	0.77	–0.20	
Turnout		19,892	49.56	−6.22	
Registered voters		40,138			
New Democratic gain from Liberal		Swing		+4.59	
Source: Elections BC

2017 British Columbia general election: Richmond-Queensborough
Party	Candidate	Votes	%	Expenditures
Liberal	Jas Johal	8,218	41.43	$67,089
New Democratic	Aman Singh	8,084	40.75	$30,369
Green	Michael Wolfe	2,524	12.72	$400
Conservative	Kay Khilvinder Hale	694	3.50	$1,279
New Republican	Lawrence Chen	318	1.60	$0
Total valid votes		19,838	100.00	–
Total rejected ballots		194	0.97	
Turnout		20,032	55.78	
Registered voters		35,911		
Liberal pickup new district.				
Source: Elections BC

British Columbia provincial government of Christy Clark
Cabinet post (1)
Predecessor	Office	Successor
Amrik Virk	Minister of Technology, Innovation and Citizens' Services; June 12, 2017–July 18, 2017	Bruce Ralston; Jinny Sims
