= Mandeep Dhaliwal =

Canadian politician

Mandeep Dhaliwal MLA
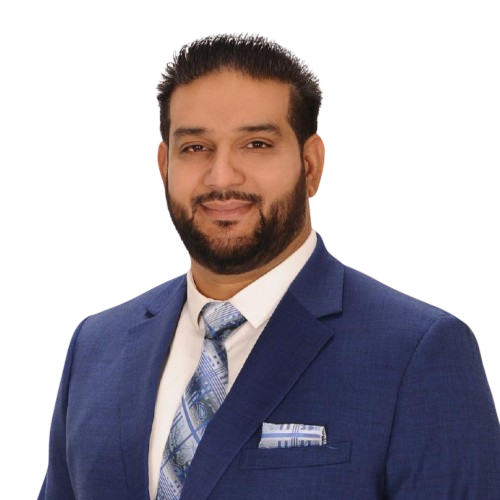

Member of the British Columbia Legislative Assembly for Surrey North
- Incumbent
- Assumed office October 19, 2024
- Preceded by: Riding established

Parliamentary Secretary for Sports and Culture
- Incumbent
- Assumed office November 20, 2026
- Preceded by: Office Established

Personal details
- Party: Conservative (provincial)

Mandeep Singh Dhaliwal MLA is a Canadian entrepreneur and politician, who was elected to the Legislative Assembly of British Columbia in the 2024 British Columbia general election. He represents the electoral district of Surrey North as a member of the Conservative Party of British Columbia.

== Early life and career ==
In his 20s, Dhaliwal moved to Canada with his family, settling down in Surrey. He owns the Fixman Auto Glass Repair and Fixman Auto Glass Supplier in Surrey. He currently lives in Maple Ridge with his wife Pawan, a nurse, and their son Diltaj. He completed his Bachelor of Arts degree in group humanities in India, and excelled in the folk game of Punjab, Kabaddi, a form of wrestling. As a national-level player, he won gold at an inter-college tournament.

His social service experience includes his membership in the BC Sikh Motorcycle Club, notably in 2016 when he did a motorcycle ride from BC to Ontario where he raised $100,000 for the BC Cancer Society. He's also participated in a fundraising bike ride from Canada to India, setting both a world record, and generating $100,000 for the Khalsa Aid organization.

== Political career ==
In January 2024, Dhaliwal was nominated as the Conservative Party of BC's candidate for Surrey North, an NDP stronghold riding. He went on to win a seat in the Legislative Assembly of BC, flip the riding, and unseat 2 time MLA and cabinet minister Rachna Singh by 1,160 votes.

He currently serves in the Official Opposition's Shadow Cabinet as the Critic for Parental Rights and Sports.

== Electoral record ==
2026 British Columbia general election: Surrey North
** Preliminary results — Not yet official **
Party	Candidate	Votes	%	±%
Conservative	Mandeep Dhaliwal	8,024	57.40	
New Democratic	Sahib Thind	4,611	32.99	
Green	Yudhbir Gill	627	4.49	
CentreBC	Parm Bhandol	343	2.45	–
OneBC	Tanya Gupta	260	1.86	–
Unaffiliated	Jag Bhandari	61	0.44	–
Total valid votes		13,926	99.62	
Total rejected ballots		53	0.38	
Turnout		13,979		
Registered voters				
Source: Elections BC
Conservative hold		Swing		+8.82

2024 British Columbia general election: Surrey North
Party	Candidate	Votes	%	±%	Expenditures
Conservative	Mandeep Dhaliwal	7,954	50.7%	–	
New Democratic	Rachna Singh	6,794	43.3%	-20.2	
Green	Sim Sandhu	662	4.2%	–	
Freedom	Kiran Hundal	162	1.0%	–	
Independent	Hobby Nijjar	125	0.8%	–	
Total valid votes		15,697	–		
Total rejected ballots					
Turnout					
Registered voters					
Conservative notional gain from New Democratic		Swing		–	
Source: Elections BC

== See also ==
- 43rd Parliament of British Columbia
