= Steve Kooner =

Canadian politician

Steve Kooner MLA
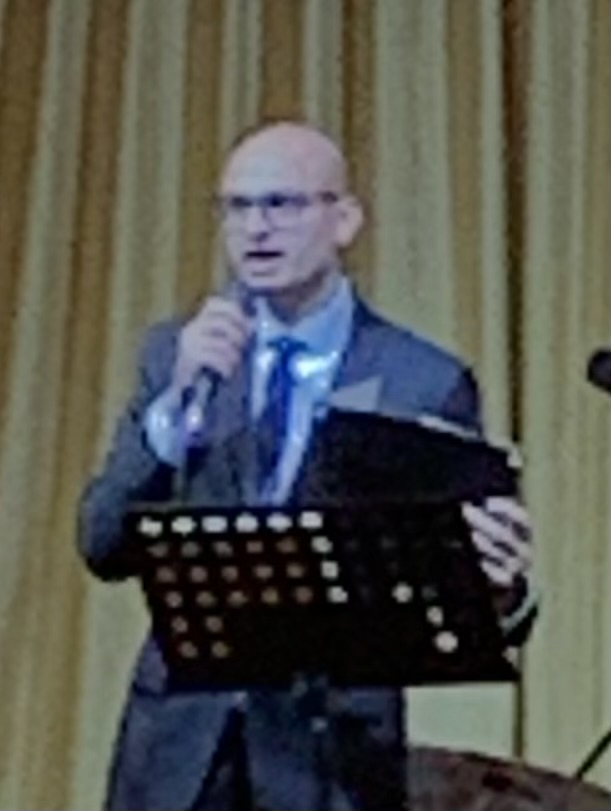
- Kooner in 2025

Member of the British Columbia Legislative Assembly for Richmond-Queensborough
- Incumbent
- Assumed office October 19, 2024
- Preceded by: Aman Singh

Parliamentary secretary for Insurance Corporation of British Columbia
- Incumbent
- Assumed office November 20, 2026
- Preceded by: Office Established

Personal details
- Born: Vancouver, British Columbia
- Party: BC Conservative
- Other political affiliations: Liberal (former)
- Education: Simon Fraser University (BA); University of Calgary (JD)
- Profession: Lawyer

Steve Kooner is a Canadian politician and lawyer who was elected to the Legislative Assembly of British Columbia in the 2024 British Columbia general election. He represents the electoral district of Richmond-Queensborough as a member of the Conservative Party of British Columbia.

== Biography ==
Born in Vancouver, Kooner received a Bachelor of Arts degree in political science from Simon Fraser University in 2001, and later graduated from the University of Calgary Faculty of Law with a Juris Doctor. He had practised in British Columbia since 2006, and had owned his firm, Steve Kooner Law Corporation, for over 17 years as of 2024. He received the Queen's Platinum Jubilee Award in 2023.

He was named the BC Conservative candidate for Richmond-Queensborough in April 2024, and defeated the incumbent New Democratic Party candidate Aman Singh in that October's provincial election to become the riding's member of the legislative assembly. He was appointed Shadow Attorney General in November 2024, opposite the current Attorney General Niki Sharma. Kooner briefly ran to be leader of the Conservative Party of BC in 2026.

== Electoral record ==
2026 British Columbia general election: Richmond-Queensborough
Party	Candidate	Votes	%	±%	Expenditures
Conservative	Steve Kooner	10,101	58.76		
New Democratic	Dhar Grewal	5,723	33.29		
Green	Luc Burns	1,311	7.63	—	
Total valid votes		17,135	99.68		
Total rejected ballots		55	0.32		
Turnout		17,190			
Registered voters					
Conservative hold		Swing		+9.39	
Source: Elections BC

2024 British Columbia general election: Richmond-Queensborough
Party	Candidate	Votes	%	±%	Expenditures
Conservative	Steve Kooner	10,052	50.91	+45.9	$29,763.05
New Democratic	Aman Singh	8,713	44.13	-2.4	$61,115.76
Independent	Errol E. Povah	721	3.65	–	$180.00
Independent	Cindy Wu	258	1.31	–	$3,596.87
Total valid votes/expense limit		19,744	99.68	–	$71,700.08
Total rejected ballots		63	0.32	–	
Turnout		19,807	53.01	–	
Registered voters		37,364			
Conservative notional gain from New Democratic		Swing		+24.1	
Source: Elections BC

== See also ==
- 43rd Parliament of British Columbia
