= Elayne Brenzinger =

Scottish-born Canadian politician (born 1951)

Member of the British Columbia Legislative Assembly for Surrey-Whalley
- In office May 16, 2001 – May 17, 2005
- Preceded by: Joan Smallwood
- Succeeded by: Bruce Ralston

Personal details
- Born: 1951 (age 74–75) Scotland
- Party: Liberal → Democratic Reform
- Spouse: Leo (m. 1981)
- Children: 3

Elayne Brenzinger (born 1951, in Scotland) was a Member of the Legislative Assembly of the Province of British Columbia, serving as a member of the British Columbia Liberal Party from 2001–2005. She was a key figure in the formation of the Democratic Reform British Columbia Party and was its first MLA.

== Career ==
She was first elected to the Legislative Assembly as a member of the British Columbia Liberal Party in the 2001 provincial election for the riding of Surrey-Whalley. Brenzinger defeated cabinet minister and long time NDP MLA, Joan Smallwood, winning 45.73 percent of the vote. Aside from Brenzinger's term in office, Surrey-Whalley has been a predominantly NDP riding.

She resigned from the Liberal caucus to sit as an independent in March 2004 because of a dispute with the party leadership, including over concerns with the sale of BC Rail to CN. She claimed then-premier and party leader Gordon Campbell humiliated her at a caucus meeting in 2003, cursing and yelling at her.

In March 2004, following her departure from the party, she made public allegations of improper conduct against liberal MLA Richard Stewart, claiming he had groped her at a night club in Victoria. Stewart was suspended from office, though Brenzinger later retracted the allegations and issued a formal apology. Stewart retracted his defamation lawsuit after the apology.

She was a key force in the creation of the Democratic Reform BC party, which was officially founded on January 15, 2005, and became its first MLA four days later.

On May 17, 2005, Brenzinger was defeated by New Democratic candidate Bruce Ralston in her Surrey-Whalley riding.

=== Election results ===
2005 British Columbia general election: Surrey-Whalley
Party	Candidate	Votes	%
New Democratic	Bruce Ralston	8,903	55.00
Liberal	Barbara Steele	4,949	30.57
Green	Roy Whyte	1,238	7.65
Democratic Reform	Elayne Brenzinger	607	3.75
Marijuana	Melady Belinda Earl	302	1.87
Independent	Joe Pal	139	0.86
Platinum	Neil Gregory Magnuson	50	0.31
Total		16,188	100.00

B.C. General Election 2001: Surrey-Whalley
Party	Candidate	Votes	%	±	Expenditures
Liberal	Elayne Brenzinger	6,693	45.73%		$53,614
NDP	Joan Smallwood	4,536	30.99%		$42,735
Green	Terry McComas	1,652	11.28%	–	$100
Unity	John A. Conway	838	5.73%		$2,880
Marijuana	Khalid Damien Arnaout	544	3.72%		$394
Reform	Mike Runté	374	2.55%		$7,957
Total valid votes		14,637	100.00%		
Total rejected ballots		85	0.58%		
Turnout		14,722	66.79%		
