= Joan Smallwood =

Canadian politician

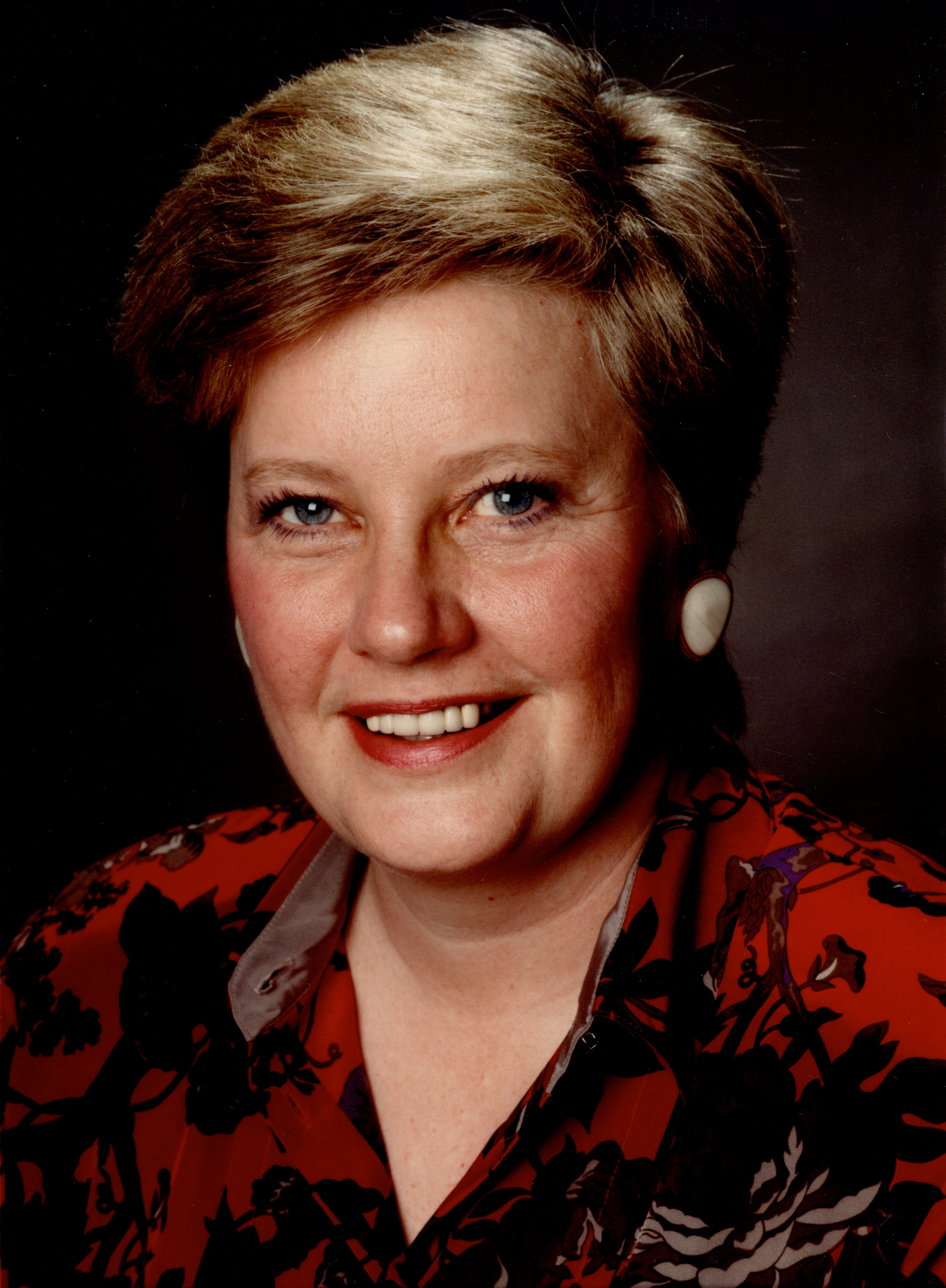

Member of the British Columbia Legislative Assembly for Surrey-Whalley Surrey-Guildford-Whalley (1986-1991)
- In office October 22, 1986 – May 16, 2001
- Preceded by: Riding Established
- Succeeded by: Elayne Brenzinger

Personal details
- Born: Vancouver, British Columbia
- Party: New Democrat

Joan Kathleen Smallwood (born August 15, 1950) is a former Canadian politician from British Columbia. A member of the New Democratic Party (NDP), she represented Surrey-Guildford-Whalley from 1986 to 1991 and Surrey-Whalley from 1991 to 2001 in the Legislative Assembly of British Columbia. She served as a cabinet minister, in a variety of roles, in the cabinets of Mike Harcourt, Glen Clark, Dan Miller and Ujjal Dosanjh.

== Early life ==
She was born Joan Kathleen Beech in Vancouver, British Columbia, the daughter of Lester Beech. In 1970, she married Larry Smallwood. Before entering politics, Smallwood worked for Langley Family Services.

== Political career ==
Following the NDP's victory in the 1991 election, Smallwood was appointed Minister of Social Services. In 1993, as part of a wider cabinet shuffle, Smallwood became Minister of Housing, Recreation and Consumer Services. In October 1995, as the Bingogate scandal emerged, Smallwood was tangentially involved as a member of the NDP executive during the period when the party received misappropriated funds. Smallwood said she was unaware of the scam but felt responsible enough to offer her resignation from cabinet on October 23. Harcourt refused her resignation. On October 25, Smallwood criticized Harcourt's handling of the scandal, saying "the premier has responsibilities he will have to account for." The following day, Harcourt dismissed her from cabinet, provoking outcry within caucus. Following Harcourt's resignation, she stood in the 1996 leadership election, placing third behind Corky Evans and winner Glen Clark.

Smallwood returned to cabinet on July 21, 1999, as Minister of Labour. After Clark's resignation, she retained her portfolio through the brief Miller ministry. On February 29, 2000, after new premier Ujjal Dosanjh was sworn in, she became Minister of Women's Equality. In November of that year, Dosanjh shuffled his cabinet and Smallwood returned to the labour ministry.

Smallwood ran for re-election in the 2001 election, but was defeated by Elayne Brenzinger.
