= Bruce Ralston =

Canadian politician

Bruce Ralston KC
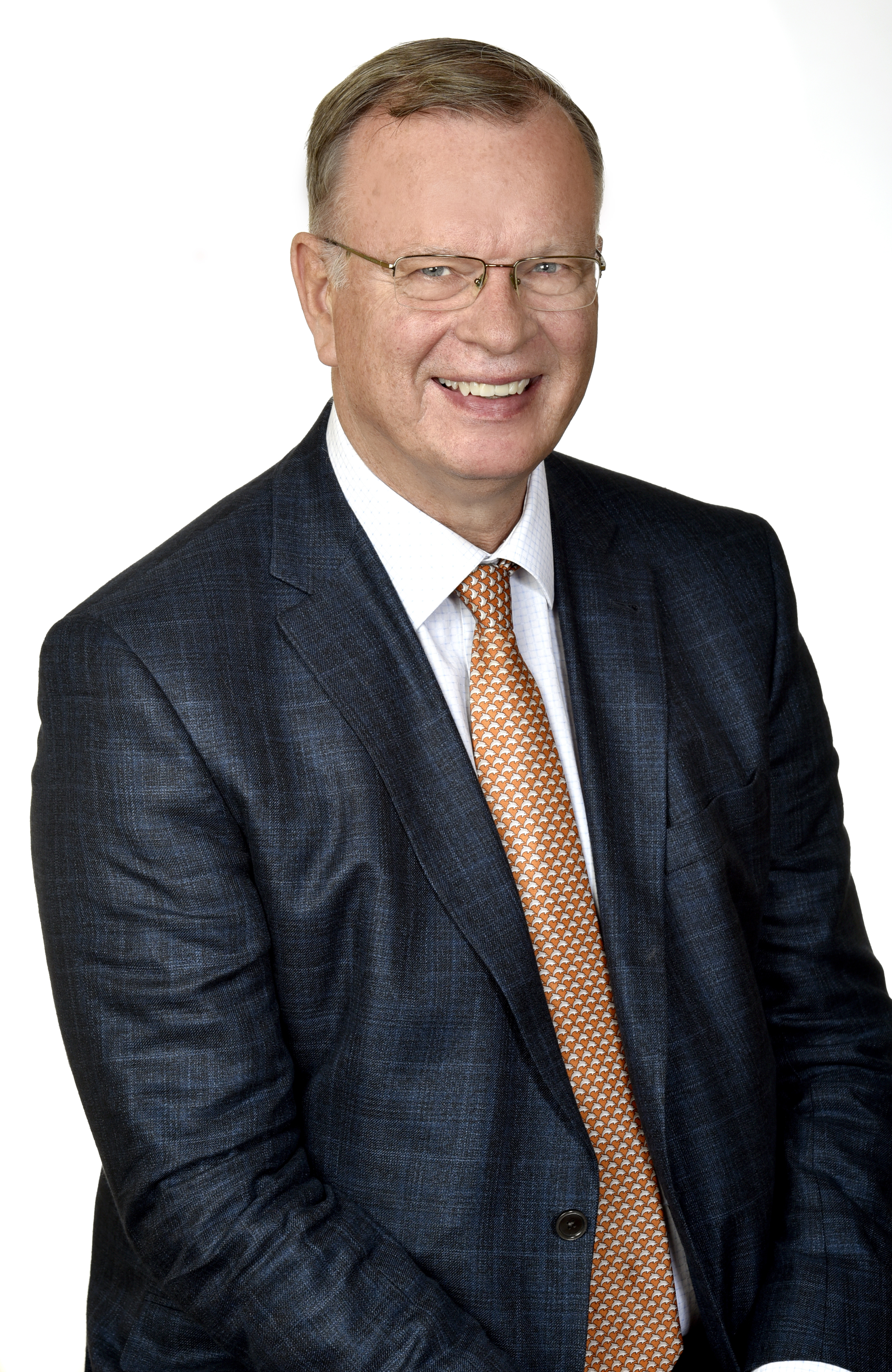

Minister of Forests of British Columbia
- In office December 7, 2022 – November 18, 2024
- Premier: David Eby
- Preceded by: Katrine Conroy (Forests, Lands, Natural Resource Operations and Rural Development)
- Succeeded by: Ravi Parmar

Minister of Energy, Mines and Low Carbon Innovation of British Columbia
- In office November 26, 2020 – December 7, 2022
- Premier: John Horgan; David Eby
- Preceded by: position established
- Succeeded by: Josie Osborne

Minister of Energy, Mines and Petroleum Resources of British Columbia
- In office January 22, 2020 – November 26, 2020
- Premier: John Horgan
- Preceded by: Michelle Mungall
- Succeeded by: position abolished

Minister of Jobs, Trade and Technology of British Columbia
- In office July 18, 2017 – January 22, 2020
- Premier: John Horgan
- Preceded by: Shirley Bond (Jobs); Jas Johal (Technology)
- Succeeded by: Michelle Mungall

Member of the British Columbia Legislative Assembly for Surrey-Whalley
- In office May 17, 2005 – September 21, 2024
- Preceded by: Elayne Brenzinger

Surrey City Councillor
- In office 1988–1993

Personal details
- Born: Victoria, British Columbia
- Party: New Democrat
- Spouse: Miriam Sobrino
- Children: 3
- Education: University of British Columbia; University of Cambridge
- Profession: Lawyer

Bruce Ralston KC is a Canadian politician. He was a Member of the Legislative Assembly (MLA) of British Columbia, representing the riding of Surrey-Whalley from 2005 until 2024. A member of the New Democratic Party (NDP), he has served in the cabinets of Premiers John Horgan and David Eby.

== Life and career ==
Ralston was born in Victoria and grew up in Vancouver. He has degrees in history and law from the University of British Columbia, and a degree in history from the University of Cambridge in England. He was called to the bar in 1982, and has lived in Surrey since 1990, where he ran his own law firm.

Ralston served on the Surrey City Council from 1988 to 1993. He was a member of the board of directors of Vancouver City Savings Credit Union from 1995 to 2006. Between 1996 and 2001, he served as president of the BC NDP.

He ran in the 2001 provincial election as the NDP candidate in Surrey-Panorama Ridge, finishing a distant second behind Liberal candidate Gulzar Cheema. In the 2005 election he instead contested the riding of Surrey-Whalley, winning the seat with 55% of the vote. He kept his seat in the 2009 election, growing his vote share to 66.5%, and was re-elected in 2013, 2017 and 2020. He replaced John Horgan as NDP house leader in March 2014, allowing Horgan to contest the party leadership.

In July 2017, Ralston was named Minister of Jobs, Trade and Technology in the NDP minority government. He swapped portfolios with Michelle Mungall in January 2020, becoming Minister of Energy, Mines and Petroleum Resources. His post was modified to Minister of Energy, Mines and Low Carbon Innovation and Minister Responsible for the Consular Corps of British Columbia in November 2020, and he was appointed Queen's counsel in December of the same year. He was subsequently named Minister of Forests in the Eby ministry on December 7, 2022, while retaining the role of Minister Responsible for the Consular Corps.

== Electoral results ==
2020 British Columbia general election: Surrey-Whalley
Party	Candidate	Votes	%	±%	Expenditures
New Democratic	Bruce Ralston	10,994	70.94	+12.32	$21,604.97
Liberal	Shaukat Khan	4,052	26.15	−3.93	$28,029.77
Vision	Jag Bhandari	228	1.47	–	$0.00
Communist	Ryan Abbott	223	1.44	+0.9	$123.40
Total valid votes		15,497	100.00	–	
Total rejected ballots		236	1.50	+0.62	
Turnout		15,733	40.59	−10.96	
Registered voters		38,764			
New Democratic hold		Swing		+8.13	
Source: Elections BC

2017 British Columbia general election: Surrey-Whalley
Party	Candidate	Votes	%	±%	Expenditures
New Democratic	Bruce Ralston	10,315	58.62	−2.81	$59,997
Liberal	Sargy Chima	5,293	30.08	+0.54	$75,151
Green	Rita Anne Fromholt	1,893	10.76	–	$322
Communist	George Gidora	96	0.54	–	$0
Total valid votes		17,597	100.00	–	
Total rejected ballots		157	0.88	−0.56	
Turnout		17,754	51.55	+5.27	
Registered voters		34,440			
Source: Elections BC

2013 British Columbia general election: Surrey-Whalley
Party	Candidate	Votes	%	Expenditures
New Democratic	Bruce Ralston	10,405	61.43	$112,496
Liberal	Kuljeet Kaur	5,004	29.54	$34,568
Conservative	Sunny Chohan	1,110	6.55	$40,961
Vision	Jag Bhandari	420	2.48	$9,375
Total valid votes		16,939	100.00	
Total rejected ballots		248	1.44	
Turnout		17,187	46.28	
Source: Elections BC

2009 British Columbia general election: Surrey-Whalley
Party	Candidate	Votes
New Democratic	Bruce Ralston	10,453
Liberal	Radhia Benalia	4,083
Green	Bernadette Kennan	1,189

2005 British Columbia general election: Surrey-Whalley
Party	Candidate	Votes	%
New Democratic	Bruce Ralston	8,903	55.00
Liberal	Barbara Steele	4,949	30.57
Green	Roy Whyte	1,238	7.65
Democratic Reform	Elayne Brenzinger	607	3.75
Marijuana	Melady Belinda Earl	302	1.87
Independent	Joe Pal	139	0.86
Platinum	Neil Gregory Magnuson	50	0.31
Total		16,188	100.00

2001 British Columbia general election: Surrey-Panorama Ridge
Party	Candidate	Votes	%	±%
Liberal	Gulzar Cheema	9,590	58.94	–
NDP	Bruce Ralston	3,240	19.91	–
Green	Sunny Athwal	1,437	8.83	–
Unity	Heather Stilwell	1,123	6.90	–
Marijuana	Randy Caine	424	2.61	–
Reform	Shirley Ann Abraham	408	2.51	–
Action	Ed Weiland	50	0.30	–
Total Valid Votes		16,272	100.00	
Total Rejected Ballots		128	0.79	
Turnout		16,400	69.04	

British Columbia provincial government of David Eby
Cabinet post (1)
Predecessor	Office	Successor
Katrine Conroy	Minister of Forests; December 7, 2022-	Incumbent
British Columbia provincial government of John Horgan
Cabinet posts (3)
Predecessor	Office	Successor
position established	Minister of Energy, Mines and Low Carbon Innovation; November 26, 2020-December 7, 2022	Josie Osborne
Michelle Mungall	Minister of Energy, Mines and Petroleum Resources; January 22, 2020-November 26, 2020	position abolished
Shirley Bond; Jas Johal	Minister of Jobs, Trade and Technology; July 18, 2017–January 22, 2020	Michelle Mungall
