= Aman Singh =

Canadian politician

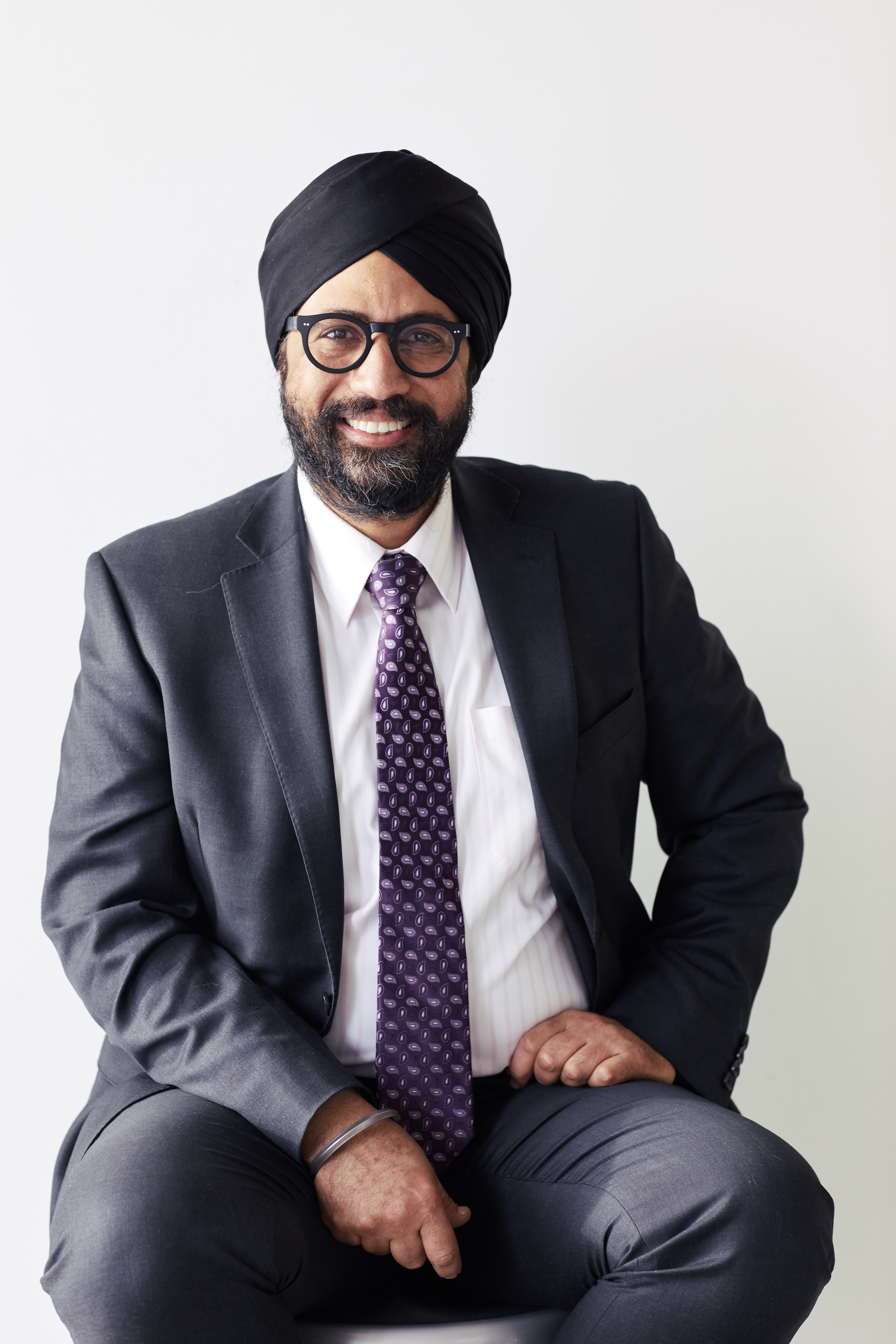

President of the British Columbia New Democratic Party
- Incumbent
- Assumed office November 16, 2025
- Preceded by: Aaron Sumexheltza

Parliamentary Secretary for Environment of British Columbia
- In office December 7, 2022 – November 18, 2024
- Appointed by: David Eby
- Minister: George Heyman
- Preceded by: Kelly Greene
- Succeeded by: Position abolished

Member of the Legislative Assembly for Richmond-Queensborough
- In office October 24, 2020 – September 21, 2024
- Preceded by: Jas Johal
- Succeeded by: Steve Kooner

Personal details
- Born: 1967 or 1968 (age 57–58) Sultanpur Lodhi, Punjab, India
- Party: New Democratic
- Education: University of California, Berkeley; University of Victoria (JD)
- Profession: Lawyer

Aman Singh is a Canadian politician who represented the electoral district of Richmond-Queensborough in the Legislative Assembly of British Columbia from 2020 until 2024, as a member of the British Columbia New Democratic Party. He is the first turban-wearing Sikh to be elected as a member of the Legislative Assembly in BC.

== Biography ==
=== Early life and career ===
Born in Sultanpur Lodhi, Punjab, India, Singh moved to Hong Kong at the age of one with his family, living there until age 18. He has some knowledge of Cantonese, and can also speak Hindi and Punjabi alongside English. He attended University of California, Berkeley, where he studied physics and anthropology. He went on to receive a law degree from University of Victoria, and operated his own law practice specializing in human and civil rights law. He had lived in Richmond, British Columbia for two decades, before moving to the Delta neighbourhood of Sunshine Hills.

=== Political career ===
Singh contested the new riding of Richmond-Queensborough in the 2017 provincial election as a candidate for the British Columbia New Democratic Party; he lost to Liberal candidate Jas Johal by 134 votes. The two faced off again in the 2020 provincial election, with Singh defeating Johal this time to win the seat. On December 7, 2022, he was appointed the parliamentary secretary for environment by premier David Eby. After losing his seat in the 2024 provincial election, Singh was elected president of the BC NDP in November 2025. On September 27, 2026, Singh was confirmed as the NDP's candidate in the riding of Vancouver-Fraserview for the 2026 British Columbia general election.

=== Personal life ===
Singh has a daughter with wife Katrina. He was diagnosed with colon cancer in August 2021, and underwent radiation, chemotherapy and surgery to remove the tumour.

== Electoral record ==
2026 British Columbia general election: Vancouver-Fraserview
The 2026 general election will be held on October 24.
| Party | Candidate | Votes | % | ±% | Expenditures |
|---|---|---|---|---|---|
| Green | Françoise Raunet | | | | |
| New Democratic | Aman Singh | | | | |
| Conservative | Deep Sandhu | | | | |
| Total valid votes | | | | | |
| Total rejected ballots | | | | | |
| Turnout | | | | | |
| Registered voters | | | | | |
Source: Elections BC

2024 British Columbia general election: Richmond-Queensborough
| Party | Candidate | Votes | % | ±% | Expenditures |
|---|---|---|---|---|---|
| Conservative | Steve Kooner | 10,052 | 50.91 | +45.9 | $29,763.05 |
| New Democratic | Aman Singh | 8,713 | 44.13 | -2.4 | $61,115.76 |
| Independent | Errol E. Povah | 721 | 3.65 | – | $180.00 |
| Independent | Cindy Wu | 258 | 1.31 | – | $3,596.87 |
| Total valid votes/expense limit | | 19,744 | 99.68 | – | $71,700.08 |
| Total rejected ballots | | 63 | 0.32 | – | |
| Turnout | | 19,807 | 53.01 | – | |
| Registered voters | | 37,364 | | | |
| Conservative notional gain from New Democratic | | Swing | | +24.1 | |
Source: Elections BC

2020 British Columbia general election: Richmond-Queensborough
| Party | Candidate | Votes | % | ±% | Expenditures |
|---|---|---|---|---|---|
| New Democratic | Aman Singh | 9,406 | 47.65 | +6.90 | $50,855.54 |
| Liberal | Jas Johal | 7,728 | 39.15 | −2.28 | $59,892.51 |
| Green | Earl Einarson | 1,496 | 7.58 | −5.14 | $2,311.39 |
| Conservative | Kay Hale | 1,108 | 5.61 | +2.11 | $6,570.00 |
| Total valid votes | | 19,738 | 100.00 | – | |
| Total rejected ballots | | 154 | 0.77 | –0.20 | |
| Turnout | | 19,892 | 49.56 | −6.22 | |
| Registered voters | | 40,138 | | | |
| New Democratic gain from Liberal | | Swing | | +4.59 | |
Source: Elections BC

2017 British Columbia general election: Richmond-Queensborough
| Party | Candidate | Votes | % | Expenditures |
|---|---|---|---|---|
| Liberal | Jas Johal | 8,218 | 41.43 | $67,089 |
| New Democratic | Aman Singh | 8,084 | 40.75 | $30,369 |
| Green | Michael Wolfe | 2,524 | 12.72 | $400 |
| Conservative | Kay Khilvinder Hale | 694 | 3.50 | $1,279 |
| New Republican | Lawrence Chen | 318 | 1.60 | $0 |
| Total valid votes | | 19,838 | 100.00 | – |
| Total rejected ballots | | 194 | 0.97 | |
| Turnout | | 20,032 | 55.78 | |
| Registered voters | | 35,911 | | |
Source: Elections BC
