= Rachna Singh =

Canadian politician and trade unionist (born 1972)

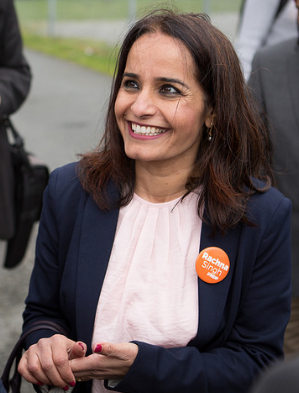

Minister of Education and Child Care of British Columbia
- In office December 7, 2022 – November 18, 2024
- Premier: David Eby
- Preceded by: Jennifer Whiteside (Minister of Education)
- Succeeded by: Lisa Beare

Parliamentary Secretary for Anti-Racism Initiatives of British Columbia
- In office November 26, 2020 – December 7, 2022
- Premier: John Horgan; David Eby
- Preceded by: Position established
- Succeeded by: Mable Elmore

Member of the British Columbia Legislative Assembly for Surrey-Green Timbers
- In office May 9, 2017 – September 21, 2024
- Preceded by: Sue Hammell
- Succeeded by: Mandeep Dhaliwal

Personal details
- Born: 1972 (age 53–54) Delhi, India
- Party: New Democratic Party
- Spouse: Gurpreet Singh
- Children: 2
- Education: Panjab University (MA, Clinical Psychology)

Rachna Singh (born 1972) is a Canadian politician and trade unionist who represented the electoral district of Surrey-Green Timbers in the Legislative Assembly of British Columbia from 2017 until 2024. A member of the British Columbia New Democratic Party (BC NDP) caucus, she has served as Minister of Education and Child Care of British Columbia from December 2022 until 2024.

== Biography ==
Singh was born in Delhi, and grew up in Chandigarh. She attended Panjab University, from which she received a master's degree in psychology. She moved to Canada in 2001, settling in Surrey, British Columbia. Prior to her election to the legislature, Singh worked as a drug and alcohol counsellor. She became active in her labour union local, and eventually became a National Representative (staff) for the Canadian Union of Public Employees representing workers through advocacy in grievance handling, labour arbitrations, organizing, community and political activism and helping advise local unions on matters of internal administration.

With incumbent Member of the Legislative Assembly (MLA) for Surrey-Green Timbers Sue Hammell declining to seek re-election in 2017, Singh decided to contest the BC NDP nomination for the riding. She was acclaimed as the NDP's candidate, then went on to defeat Liberal candidate and former Surrey-Green Timbers MLA Brenda Locke at the general election.

After winning re-election in 2020, Singh was appointed Parliamentary Secretary for Anti-Racism Initiatives by Premier John Horgan. On December 7, 2022 she was named Minister of Education and Child Care by Premier David Eby.

Singh is married to Gurpreet Singh, a journalist for the Georgia Straight and publisher of the Radical Desi magazine; they have two children together. Both descend from families with a history of activism for various social and economic causes in their native India. She is a secular Sikh.

== Electoral history ==
2024 British Columbia general election: Surrey North (provincial electoral district)
Party	Candidate	Votes	%	±%	Expenditures
Conservative	Mandeep Dhaliwal	7,954	50.7%		
New Democratic	Rachna Singh	6,794	43.3%	-20.2	
Green	Sim Sandhu	662	4.2%		
Freedom	Kiran Hundal	162	1.0%		
Independent	Hobby Nijjar	125	0.8%		
Total valid votes		15,697	–		
Total rejected ballots					
Turnout					
Registered voters					
Source: Elections BC

2020 British Columbia general election: Surrey-Green Timbers
Party	Candidate	Votes	%	±%	Expenditures
New Democratic	Rachna Singh	8,171	59.59	+1.40	$31,108.56
Liberal	Dilraj Atwal	5,540	40.41	+7.46	$34,751.00
Total valid votes		13,711	100.00	–	
Total rejected ballots		224	1.61	+0.56	
Turnout		13,935	47.20	–7.41	
Registered voters		29,526			
Source: Elections BC

2017 British Columbia general election: Surrey-Green Timbers
Party	Candidate	Votes	%	±%	Expenditures
New Democratic	Rachna Singh	8,945	58.29	+0.23	$58,322
Liberal	Brenda Locke	5,056	32.95	−1.57	$20,975
Green	Saira Aujla	1,112	7.25	+3.2	$7,739
No affiliation	Vikram Bajwa	163	1.06	–	$7,980
Your Political Party	Kanwaljit Singh Moti	69	0.44	–	$3,612
Total valid votes		15,345	100.00	–	
Total rejected ballots		163	1.05	−0.14	
Turnout		15,508	54.61	+2.29	
Registered voters		28,400			
Source: Elections BC

British Columbia provincial government of David Eby
Cabinet post (1)
Predecessor	Office	Successor
Jennifer Whiteside	Minister of Education and Child Care; December 7, 2022 –	Incumbent
