= Surrey North (provincial electoral district) =

Provincial electoral district in British Columbia, Canada

British Columbia electoral district
- Interactive map of riding boundaries

Provincial electoral district
- Legislature: Legislative Assembly of British Columbia
MLA
Mandeep Dhaliwal
Conservative
- District created: 2023
- First contested: 2024
- Last contested: 2026

Demographics
- Population (2021): 59,891
- Area (km²): 27
- Pop. density (per km²): 2,218.2
- Census division: Metro Vancouver
- Census subdivision: Surrey (part)

Surrey North is a provincial electoral district in British Columbia that has been represented in the Legislative Assembly of British Columbia since 2024.

Created under the 2021 British Columbia electoral redistribution, the riding was first contested in the 2024 general election. It was created out of parts of Surrey-Green Timbers and Surrey-Whalley.

== Demographics ==
Population, 2021	59,891
Area (km^{2})	27
Pop. Density (people per km^{2})	2,218
Source: BC Electoral Boundaries Commission

== Geography ==
The district consists of the northwestern corner of the city of Surrey, bounded mostly on the east by 132 Street and widening south of 88 Avenue as far east as 140 Street to take in Bear Creek Park.

== Members of the Legislative Assembly ==
This riding has elected the following members of the Legislative Assembly:

Assembly	Years	Member	Party
Surrey North; Riding created from Surrey-Green Timbers and Surrey-Whalley
43rd	2024–2026	Mandeep Dhaliwal	Conservative
44th	2026–present	Mandeep Dhaliwal	Conservative

== Election results ==
2026 British Columbia general election
** Preliminary results — Not yet official **
Party	Candidate	Votes	%	±%
Conservative	Mandeep Dhaliwal	7,535	57.90	+7.23
New Democratic	Sahib Thind	4,280	32.89	-10.40
Green	Yudhbir Gill	574	4.41	+0.19
CentreBC	Parm Bhandol	321	2.47	–
OneBC	Tanya Gupta	243	1.87	–
Unaffiliated	Jag Bhandari	60	0.46	–
Total valid votes		13,013	99.61	
Total rejected ballots		51	0.39	+0.18
Turnout		13,064		
Registered voters				
Source: Elections BC
Conservative hold		Swing		+8.82

2024 British Columbia general election
Party	Candidate	Votes	%	±%	Expenditures
Conservative	Mandeep Dhaliwal	7,954	50.7%	–	
New Democratic	Rachna Singh	6,794	43.3%	-20.2	
Green	Sim Sandhu	662	4.2%	–	
Freedom	Kiran Hundal	162	1.0%	–	
Independent	Hobby Nijjar	125	0.8%	–	
Total valid votes		15,697	–		
Total rejected ballots					
Turnout					
Registered voters					
Conservative notional gain from New Democratic		Swing		–	
Source: Elections BC

2020 provincial election redistributed results
Party	%
New Democratic	63.5
Liberal	35.1

== See also ==
- List of British Columbia provincial electoral districts
- Canadian provincial electoral districts
