= Surrey-Guildford =

Provincial electoral district in British Columbia, Canada

British Columbia electoral district
- Interactive map of riding boundaries

Provincial electoral district
- Legislature: Legislative Assembly of British Columbia
MLA
Garry Thind
Conservative
- District created: 2015
- First contested: 2017
- Last contested: 2026

Demographics
- Population (2021): 60,783
- Area (km²): 46
- Pop. density (per km²): 1,321.4
- Census division: Metro Vancouver
- Census subdivision: Surrey (part)

Surrey-Guildford is a provincial electoral district in British Columbia that has been represented in the Legislative Assembly of British Columbia since 2017.

Created under the 2015 British Columbia electoral redistribution, the district was first contested in the 2017 general election. It was created out of parts of Surrey-Tynehead and Surrey-Whalley.

== Demographics ==
Population, 2021	60,783
Area (km^{2})	46
Pop. density (people per km^{2})	1,321
Source: BC Electoral Boundaries Commission

== Geography ==
The district encompasses the northeastern portion of the City of Surrey, including the neighbourhoods of Port Mann, Fraser Heights, Tynehead, Anniedale, Port Kells and Guildford.

== Members of the Legislative Assembly ==
This riding has elected the following members of the Legislative Assembly:

Assembly	Years	Member	Party
Surrey-Guildford; Riding created from Surrey-Tynehead and Surrey-Whalley
41st	2017–2020	Garry Begg	New Democratic
42nd	2020–2024	Garry Begg	New Democratic
43rd	2024–2026	Garry Begg	New Democratic
44th	2026–present	Garry Thind	Conservative

== Election results ==
2026 British Columbia general election
Party	Candidate	Votes	%	±%	Expenditures
Conservative	Garry Thind	7,741	50.7	+3.8	
New Democratic	Garry Begg	6,269	41.0	-5.9	
Green	Jodi Murphy	964	6.3	+2.0	
Unaffiliated	James Yaroshuk	307	2.0	-	
Total valid votes		15,281			
Total rejected ballots					
Turnout					
Registered voters					
Conservative gain from New Democratic		Swing		+9.6	
Source: Elections BC

2024 British Columbia general election
Party	Candidate	Votes	%	±%
New Democratic	Garry Begg	8,947	46.83	-13.76
Conservative	Honveer Singh Randhawa	8,925	46.81	
Green	Manjeet Singh Sahota	824	4.32	-3.51
Independent	Kabir Qurban	370	1.94	
Total valid votes		19,066	100.00	
Source: Elections BC

2020 British Columbia general election
Party	Candidate	Votes	%	±%	Expenditures
New Democratic	Garry Begg	10,403	60.59	+10.99	$40,309.39
Liberal	Dave Hans	5,139	29.93	−8.21	$42,168.46
Green	Jodi Murphy	1,345	7.83	−1.98	$1,281.64
Independent	Sam Kofalt	282	1.64	–	$1,015.24
Total valid votes		17,169	100.00	–	
Total rejected ballots		148	0.85	+0.14	
Turnout		17,317	45.69	−10.07	
Registered voters		37,905			
Source: Elections BC

2017 British Columbia general election
Party	Candidate	Votes	%	Expenditures
New Democratic	Garry Begg	9,263	49.85	$67,072
Liberal	Amrik Virk	7,015	37.76	$71,381
Green	Jodi Murphy	1,840	9.90	$,1838
Christian Heritage	Kevin Pielak	462	2.49	$1,015
Total valid votes		18,580	100.00	
Total rejected ballots		133	0.71	
Turnout		18,713	55.76	
Registered voters		33,561		
Source: Elections BC

== See also ==
- List of British Columbia provincial electoral districts
- Canadian provincial electoral districts
