= Garry Begg =

Canadian politician

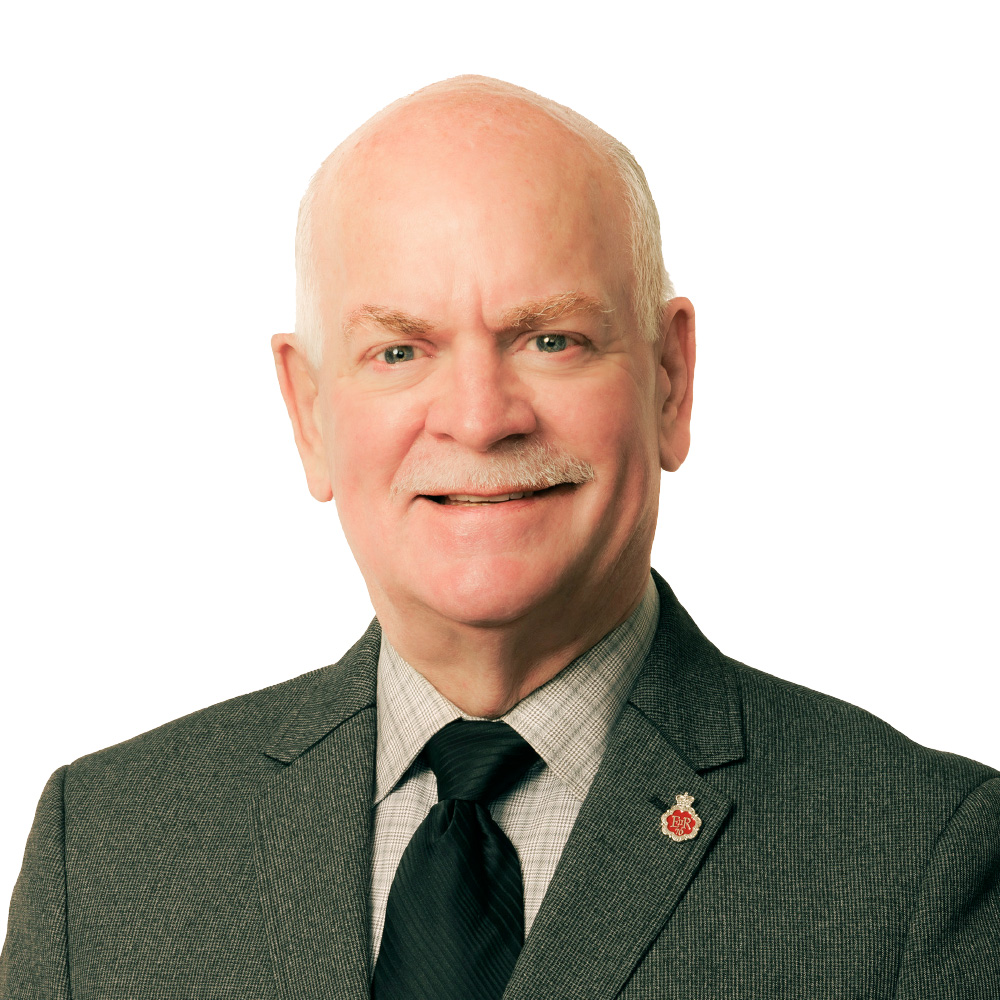
- Campaign portrait, 2024

Minister of Public Safety and Solicitor General of British Columbia
- In office November 18, 2024 – July 17, 2025
- Premier: David Eby
- Preceded by: Mike Farnworth
- Succeeded by: Nina Krieger

Member of the British Columbia Legislative Assembly for Surrey-Guildford
- In office May 9, 2017 – October 24, 2026
- Preceded by: Riding established
- Succeeded by: Garry Thind

Personal details
- Born: Ontario
- Party: New Democratic Party
- Spouse: Val Begg

Garry Begg is a Canadian politician who served as a member of the Legislative Assembly of British Columbia from 2017 to 2026, representing the electoral district of Surrey-Guildford.

== Biography ==
Born in Ontario, Begg had a 38-year career with the Royal Canadian Mounted Police (RCMP), eight of which was spent in Surrey; he attained the rank of inspector with the force. He previously ran in the 2015 federal election as the federal New Democratic Party's candidate in Fleetwood—Port Kells, but was not elected.

In the 2017 provincial election, he ran in the newly established riding of Surrey-Guildford as a BC NDP candidate against Liberal Amrik Virk, also a former RCMP inspector. Begg defeated Virk to become a member of the Legislative Assembly of British Columbia, and served as government caucus whip in his first term. He retained his seat in the 2020 provincial election.

Begg faced a tight race against BC Conservative candidate Honveer Singh Randhawa in the 2024 election, with initial results indicating that Randhawa was leading by 103 votes. After mail-in and absentee ballots were counted, Elections BC posted updated results on October 28, with Begg winning by 27 votes; that figure was later revised to 21 votes. As the margin was less than 1/500th of the total ballots cast, an automatic judicial recount was triggered. The recount was completed on November 8, with Begg re-elected by a margin of 22 votes, allowing the NDP to hold on to a majority government.

He was named to the Eby ministry on November 18, 2024 to serve as Minister of Public Safety and Solicitor General. He was succeeded by Nina Krieger in July 2025.

He and his wife Val have two children.

== Electoral record ==
=== Provincial elections ===
2024 British Columbia general election: Surrey-Guildford
Party	Candidate	Votes	%	±%
New Democratic	Garry Begg	8,947	46.83	-13.76
Conservative	Honveer Singh Randhawa	8,925	46.81	
Green	Manjeet Singh Sahota	824	4.32	-3.51
Independent	Kabir Qurban	370	1.94	
Total valid votes		19,066	100.00	
Source: Elections BC

2020 British Columbia general election: Surrey-Guildford
Party	Candidate	Votes	%	±%	Expenditures
New Democratic	Garry Begg	10,403	60.59	+10.99	$40,309.39
Liberal	Dave Hans	5,139	29.93	−8.21	$42,168.46
Green	Jodi Murphy	1,345	7.83	−1.98	$1,281.64
Independent	Sam Kofalt	282	1.64	–	$1,015.24
Total valid votes		17,169	100.00	–	
Total rejected ballots		148	0.85	+0.14	
Turnout		17,317	45.69	−10.07	
Registered voters		37,905			
Source: Elections BC

2017 British Columbia general election: Surrey-Guildford
Party	Candidate	Votes	%	Expenditures
New Democratic	Garry Begg	9,263	49.85	$67,072
Liberal	Amrik Virk	7,015	37.76	$71,381
Green	Jodi Murphy	1,840	9.90	$,1838
Christian Heritage	Kevin Pielak	462	2.49	$1,015
Total valid votes		18,580	100.00	
Total rejected ballots		133	0.71	
Turnout		18,713	55.76	
Registered voters		33,561		
Source: Elections BC

=== Federal elections ===
2015 Canadian federal election: Fleetwood—Port Kells
Party	Candidate	Votes	%	±%	Expenditures
Liberal	Ken Hardie	22,871	46.90	+31.24	$50,601.97
Conservative	Nina Grewal	14,275	29.27	–18.56	$67,464.21
New Democratic	Garry Begg	10,463	21.46	–11.60	$97,936.69
Green	Richard Hosein	1,154	2.37	–0.20	$3,625.85
Total valid votes/expense limit		48,763	99.45	–	$206,797.64
Total rejected ballots		269	0.55	+0.02	
Turnout		49,032	65.25	+12.39	
Eligible voters		75,150			
Liberal gain from Conservative		Swing		+24.90	
Source: Elections Canada
