= Richmond-Queensborough =

Provincial electoral district in British Columbia, Canada

British Columbia electoral district
- Location in Richmond

Provincial electoral district
- Legislature: Legislative Assembly of British Columbia
MLA
Steve Kooner
Conservative
- District created: 2015
- First contested: 2017
- Last contested: 2026

Demographics
- Population (2021): 54,947
- Area (km²): 90
- Pop. density (per km²): 610.5
- Census division: Metro Vancouver
- Census subdivision(s): New Westminster, Richmond

Richmond-Queensborough is a provincial electoral district for the Legislative Assembly of British Columbia, Canada. It was created in the 2015 redistribution from parts of Richmond East and New Westminster. It was first contested in the 2017 election.

== Geography ==
The electoral district comprises the part of the city of Richmond (including Cambie, Shellmont and Hamilton) and the portion of the city of New Westminster on Lulu Island (Queensborough) lying to the east of the following line: commencing at River Drive directly below the Oak Street Bridge and Hwy 99, east along said drive to Shell Road, thence south along said road to Bridgeport Road, thence east along said road to No. 5 Road, thence south along said road to Alderbridge Way, thence west along said way to No. 4 Road, thence south along said road to Blundell Road, thence west along said road to No. 3 Road, thence south along said road and its production to Richmond's southern limit.

== Members of the Legislative Assembly ==
This riding has elected the following members of the Legislative Assembly:

Richmond-Queensborough
Assembly	Years	Member	Party
Richmond East and New Westminster prior to 2017
41st	2017–2020	Jas Johal	Liberal
42nd	2020–2024	Aman Singh	New Democratic
43rd	2024–2026	Steve Kooner	Conservative
44th	2026–present	Steve Kooner	Conservative

== Election results ==
Graph of election results in Richmond—Queensborough (minor parties that never got 2% of the vote or didn't run consistently are omitted)

2026 British Columbia general election
Party	Candidate	Votes	%	±%	Expenditures
Conservative	Steve Kooner	9,642	58.84	+7.93	
New Democratic	Dhar Grewal	5,453	33.28	-10.85	
Green	Luc Burns	1,239	7.56	–	
Total valid votes		16,334	99.68		
Total rejected ballots		53	0.32		
Turnout					
Registered voters					
Conservative hold		Swing		+9.39	
Source: Elections BC

2024 British Columbia general election
Party	Candidate	Votes	%	±%	Expenditures
Conservative	Steve Kooner	10,052	50.91	+45.9	$29,763.05
New Democratic	Aman Singh	8,713	44.13	-2.4	$61,115.76
Independent	Errol E. Povah	721	3.65	–	$180.00
Independent	Cindy Wu	258	1.31	–	$3,596.87
Total valid votes/expense limit		19,744	99.68	–	$71,700.08
Total rejected ballots		63	0.32	–	
Turnout		19,807	53.01	–	
Registered voters		37,364			
Conservative notional gain from New Democratic		Swing		+24.1	
Source: Elections BC

2020 provincial election redistributed results
Party	%
New Democratic	46.5
Liberal	41.3
Green	7.2
Conservative	5.0

2020 British Columbia general election
Party	Candidate	Votes	%	±%	Expenditures
New Democratic	Aman Singh	9,406	47.65	+6.90	$50,855.54
Liberal	Jas Johal	7,728	39.15	−2.28	$59,892.51
Green	Earl Einarson	1,496	7.58	−5.14	$2,311.39
Conservative	Kay Hale	1,108	5.61	+2.11	$6,570.00
Total valid votes		19,738	100.00	–	
Total rejected ballots		154	0.77	–0.20	
Turnout		19,892	49.56	−6.22	
Registered voters		40,138			
New Democratic gain from Liberal		Swing		+4.59	
Source: Elections BC

2018 British Columbia electoral reform referendum
Side	Votes	%
First past the post	8,787	69.93
Proportional representation	3,779	30.07
Total valid votes	12,566	100.0
Total rejected ballots	97	0.77
Source: Elections BC

2017 British Columbia general election
Party	Candidate	Votes	%	Expenditures
Liberal	Jas Johal	8,218	41.43	$67,089
New Democratic	Aman Singh	8,084	40.75	$30,369
Green	Michael Wolfe	2,524	12.72	$400
Conservative	Kay Khilvinder Hale	694	3.50	$1,279
New Republican	Lawrence Chen	318	1.60	$0
Total valid votes		19,838	100.00	–
Total rejected ballots		194	0.97	
Turnout		20,032	55.78	
Registered voters		35,911		
Liberal pickup new district.				
Source: Elections BC

== Student vote results ==
Student Vote Canada is a non-partisan program in Canada that holds mock elections in elementary and high schools alongside general elections (with the same candidates and same electoral system).

2024 British Columbia general election
Party	Candidate	Votes	%	±%
New Democratic	Aman Singh	640	44.44	−4.75
Conservative	Steve Kooner	577	40.07	+33.48
Independent	Cindy Wu	173	12.01	–
Independent	Errol E. Povah	50	3.47	–
Total valid votes		1,440	100.0	–
Source: Student Vote Canada

2020 British Columbia general election
Party	Candidate	Votes	%	±%
New Democratic	Aman Singh	336	49.19	+5.34
Green	Earl Einarson	166	24.3	−0.28
Liberal	Jas Johal	136	19.91	−6.44
Conservative	Kay Khilvinder Hale	45	6.59	+3.67
Total valid votes		683	100.0	–
Source: Student Vote Canada

2017 British Columbia general election
Party	Candidate	Votes	%
New Democratic	Aman Singh	496	43.85
Liberal	Jas Johal	298	26.35
Green	Michael Wolfe	278	24.58
Conservative	Kay Khilvinder Hale	33	2.92
New Republican	Lawrence Chen	26	2.3
Total valid votes		1,131	100.0
Source: Student Vote Canada

== See also ==
- List of British Columbia provincial electoral districts
- Canadian provincial electoral districts
