= Amrik Virk =

Canadian politician

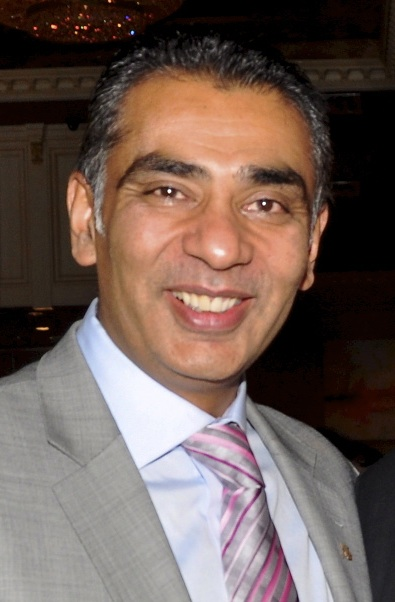
- Amrik Virk in 2013

Member of the British Columbia Legislative Assembly for Surrey-Tynehead
- In office May 14, 2013 – May 9, 2017
- Preceded by: Dave Hayer
- Succeeded by: Riding redistributed

Personal details
- Born: 1963 or 1964 (age 62–63) India
- Party: Liberal
- Spouse: Jatinder Virk
- Children: Jusleen Virk; Anisha Virk; Maansi Virk
- Profession: Police officer, politician

Amrik S. Virk (born 1963 or 1964) is a Canadian politician, who was elected to the Legislative Assembly of British Columbia in the 2013 provincial election. He represented the electoral district of Surrey-Tynehead as a member of the British Columbia Liberal Party and was appointed Minister of Advanced Education on June 10, 2013, by Premier Christy Clark. Following a compensation scandal, he was appointed Minister of Technology, Innovation, and Citizens' Services on December 18, 2014, dropping his responsibilities for Advanced Education.

== Biography ==
Virk was born in India and moved to the Canadian city of Williams Lake at the age of five years. He has lived in Surrey since 2002 with his wife Jatinder and their three daughters.

Virk holds a B.A in Economics and History. from Simon Fraser University.

An extensive career with the Royal Canadian Mounted Police (RCMP) included a variety of policing duties with a substantial portion of his experience with various First Nations communities. In 2001, Virk was commissioned to the rank of Inspector and posted to Surrey where he was active in the issue of youth and gang violence in communities throughout the Lower Mainland and worked extensively with community leaders to help create the British Columbia Integrated Gang Task Force. He left Surrey RCMP in 2006 while serving as the acting Officer in Charge of Operations (one of two Deputy Chief equivalents) and transferred to Langley as the Officer in Charge of Operations.

Virk was a community volunteer. In six years spent on the board of directors of the Surrey Memorial Hospital Foundation, he helped raise millions of dollars for enhancing health care for Surrey residents. He also served on the board of Kwantlen Polytechnic University.

In April 2014, Virk was linked to a scheme to funnel $100,000 in excess compensation to two senior Kwantlen Polytechnic University administrators, a scheme that violated government rules on executive compensation and disclosure. A report on the scandal, acknowledging wrongdoing but establishing no penalty, was released on June 17, 2014, in the shadow of the release of a long-awaited and controversial decision on an Enbridge pipeline expansion project. However, a revised report was released showing that Virk was aware of the compensation violations. Virk was moved from Advanced Education to Technology, Innovation, and Citizens' Services on the same day the revised report was released.

In the 2017 provincial election, Virk was defeated by Garry Begg in the redistributed riding of Surrey-Guildford.

== Recognition ==
In addition to the RCMP Long Service Medal and Commissioner's Commendation for Bravery, Virk has received the Queen Elizabeth II Silver Jubilee Medal and the Queen Elizabeth II Golden Jubilee Medal.

== Electoral record ==
2017 British Columbia general election: Surrey-Guildford
| Party | Candidate | Votes | % | Expenditures |
|---|---|---|---|---|
| New Democratic | Garry Begg | 9,263 | 49.85 | $67,072 |
| Liberal | Amrik Virk | 7,015 | 37.76 | $71,381 |
| Green | Jodi Murphy | 1,840 | 9.90 | $,1838 |
| Christian Heritage | Kevin Pielak | 462 | 2.49 | $1,015 |
| Total valid votes | | 18,580 | 100.00 | |
| Total rejected ballots | | 133 | 0.71 | |
| Turnout | | 18,713 | 55.76 | |
| Registered voters | | 33,561 | | |
Source: Elections BC

2013 British Columbia general election: Surrey-Tynehead
| Party | Candidate | Votes | % | |
|---|---|---|---|---|
| Liberal | Amrik Virk | 9,172 | 48.15 | -4.35 |
| New Democratic | Avtar Bains | 7,539 | 39.58 | -3.65 |
| Conservative | Barry J. Sikora | 2,040 | 10.71 | – |
| Vision | Sukhi Gill | 298 | 1.56 | – |
| Total valid votes | | 19,049 | 100.00 | |
| Total rejected ballots | | 176 | 0.92 | |
| Turnout | | 19,225 | 52.13 | |
Source: Elections BC
