= List of British Columbia provincial electoral districts =

This is a list of the 93 provincial electoral districts (also informally known as ridings in Canadian English) of British Columbia, Canada, as defined by the 2021 electoral redistribution. These ridings came into effect for the 2024 British Columbia general election, replacing the previous set of districts defined in 2015.

British Columbia provincial electoral districts are constituencies that elect members of the Legislative Assembly (MLAs) to the Legislative Assembly of British Columbia every election.

== Current electoral districts ==
- Abbotsford-Mission
- Abbotsford South
- Abbotsford West
- Boundary-Similkameen
- Bulkley Valley-Stikine
- Burnaby Centre
- Burnaby East
- Burnaby-New Westminster
- Burnaby North
- Burnaby South-Metrotown
- Cariboo-Chilcotin
- Chilliwack-Cultus Lake
- Chilliwack North
- Columbia River-Revelstoke
- Coquitlam-Burke Mountain
- Coquitlam-Maillardville
- Courtenay-Comox
- Cowichan Valley
- Delta North
- Delta South
- Esquimalt-Colwood
- Fraser-Nicola
- Juan de Fuca-Malahat
- Kamloops Centre
- Kamloops-North Thompson
- Kelowna Centre
- Kelowna-Lake Country-Coldstream
- Kelowna-Mission
- Kootenay Central
- Kootenay-Monashee
- Kootenay-Rockies
- Ladysmith-Oceanside
- Langford-Highlands
- Langley-Abbotsford
- Langley-Walnut Grove
- Langley-Willowbrook
- Maple Ridge East
- Maple Ridge-Pitt Meadows
- Mid Island-Pacific Rim
- Nanaimo-Gabriola Island
- Nanaimo-Lantzville
- Nechako Lakes
- New Westminster-Coquitlam
- North Coast-Haida Gwaii
- North Island
- North Vancouver-Lonsdale
- North Vancouver-Seymour
- Oak Bay-Gordon Head
- Peace River North
- Peace River South
- Penticton-Summerland
- Port Coquitlam
- Port Moody-Burquitlam
- Powell River-Sunshine Coast
- Prince George-Mackenzie
- Prince George-North Cariboo
- Prince George-Valemount
- Richmond-Bridgeport
- Richmond Centre
- Richmond-Queensborough
- Richmond-Steveston
- Saanich North and the Islands
- Saanich South
- Salmon Arm-Shuswap
- Skeena
- Surrey City Centre
- Surrey-Cloverdale
- Surrey-Fleetwood
- Surrey-Guildford
- Surrey-Newton
- Surrey North
- Surrey-Panorama
- Surrey-Serpentine River
- Surrey South
- Surrey-White Rock
- Vancouver-Fraserview
- Vancouver-Hastings
- Vancouver-Kensington
- Vancouver-Langara
- Vancouver-Little Mountain
- Vancouver-Point Grey
- Vancouver-Quilchena
- Vancouver-Renfrew
- Vancouver-South Granville
- Vancouver-Strathcona
- Vancouver-West End
- Vancouver-Yaletown
- Vernon-Lumby
- Victoria-Beacon Hill
- Victoria-Swan Lake
- West Kelowna-Peachland
- West Vancouver-Capilano
- West Vancouver-Sea to Sky

== See also ==
- List of British Columbia provincial electoral districts (2001–2009)
- List of British Columbia provincial electoral districts (2009–2017)
- Canadian provincial electoral districts
- Defunct districts
