= Surrey-Green Timbers =

Defunct provincial electoral district in British Columbia, Canada

Coordinates: 49.172°N 122.849°W

British Columbia electoral district
- Location in Surrey

Defunct provincial electoral district
- Legislature: Legislative Assembly of British Columbia
- First contested: 1991
- Last contested: 2020

Demographics
- Population (2001): 53,132
- Area (km²): 16.80
- Census division: Metro Vancouver
- Census subdivision: Surrey

Surrey-Green Timbers is a former provincial electoral district for the Legislative Assembly of British Columbia, Canada, in use from 1991 to 2024. As per the 2021 British Columbia electoral redistribution, the riding was dissolved prior to the 2024 election, with its territory divided between Surrey North, Surrey City Centre and Surrey-Newton.

== Demographics ==
Population, 2001	53,132
Population Change, 1996–2001	6.7%
Area (km^{2})	16.80
Pop. Density (people per km^{2})	3,163

== Members of the Legislative Assembly ==
This riding has elected the following members of the Legislative Assembly:

Surrey-Green Timbers
Assembly	Years	Member	Party
Surrey-Guildford-Whalley prior to 1991.
35th	1991–1996	Sue Hammell	New Democratic
36th	1996–2001	Sue Hammell	New Democratic
37th	2001–2005	Brenda Locke	Liberal
38th	2005–2009	Sue Hammell	New Democratic
39th	2009–2013	Sue Hammell	New Democratic
40th	2013–2017	Sue Hammell	New Democratic
41st	2017–2020	Rachna Singh	New Democratic
42nd	2020–2024	Rachna Singh	New Democratic
Riding dissolved into Surrey North, Surrey City Centre and Surrey-Newton

== Election results ==
Graph of the election results in Surrey-Green Timbers (minor parties combined into "Others")

2020 British Columbia general election
Party	Candidate	Votes	%	±%	Expenditures
New Democratic	Rachna Singh	8,171	59.59	+1.40	$31,108.56
Liberal	Dilraj Atwal	5,540	40.41	+7.46	$34,751.00
Total valid votes		13,711	100.00	–	
Total rejected ballots		224	1.61	+0.56	
Turnout		13,935	47.20	–7.41	
Registered voters		29,526			
Source: Elections BC

2017 British Columbia general election
Party	Candidate	Votes	%	±%	Expenditures
New Democratic	Rachna Singh	8,945	58.29	+0.23	$58,322
Liberal	Brenda Locke	5,056	32.95	−1.57	$20,975
Green	Saira Aujla	1,112	7.25	+3.2	$7,739
No affiliation	Vikram Bajwa	163	1.06	–	$7,980
Your Political Party	Kanwaljit Singh Moti	69	0.44	–	$3,612
Total valid votes		15,345	100.00	–	
Total rejected ballots		163	1.05	−0.14	
Turnout		15,508	54.61	+2.29	
Registered voters		28,400			
Source: Elections BC

2013 British Columbia general election
Party	Candidate	Votes	%
New Democratic	Sue Hammell	9386	58.06
Liberal	Amrik Tung	5581	34.52
Green	Richard Hosein	655	4.05
Conservative	Lisa Maharaj	444	2.75
Vision	Harjit Singh Heir	101	0.62
Total valid votes		16167	100.00
Total rejected ballots		194	1.19
Turnout		16361	52.32
Source: Elections BC

2009 British Columbia general election
Party	Candidate	Votes	%	±%
New Democratic	Sue Hammell	10,965	72.73	+11.91
Liberal	Rani Mangat	3,624	24.03	−8.51
Green	Dan Kashagama	488	3.24	−1.20
Total		15,077	100.00	

2005 British Columbia general election
Party	Candidate	Votes	%	±%
New Democratic	Sue Hammell	10,836	60.82	+24.51
Liberal	Brenda Locke	5,619	31.54	−17.41
Green	Sebastian Sajda	791	4.44	–
Marijuana	Amanda Boggan	225	1.26	−2.39
Emerged Democracy	Rob Norberg	151	0.85	–
Democratic Reform	Ravi Chand	142	0.80	–
Communist	Harjit Singh Daudharia	52	0.29	+0.38
Total		17,816	100.00	

B.C. General Election 2001: Surrey-Green Timbers
Party	Candidate	Votes	%	±	Expenditures
Liberal	Brenda Locke	7,539	48.95%	+15.16%	$46,658
NDP	Sue Hammell	5,592	36.31%	-13.80%	$37,237
Unity	C. Lewis Robinson	1,067	6.93%	n/a	$7,196
Marijuana	Dennis Kalsi	561	3.65%	n/a	$394
Reform	Jim Paterson	538	3.49%	-2.28%	$3,277
Communist	Harjit Singh Daudharia	103	0.67%	+0.37%	$332
Total valid votes		15,400	100.00%		
Total rejected ballots		151	0.98%		
Turnout		15,551	66.77%		

B.C. General Election 1996: Surrey-Green Timbers
Party	Candidate	Votes	%	±	Expenditures
NDP	Sue Hammell	10,278	50.11%	+3.95%	$36,931
Liberal	Bill Phelps	6,930	33.79%	+0.47%	$39,334
Reform	Dominic Darmanin	1,183	5.77%	n/a	$7,188
Progressive Democrat	Gerard Baisch	1,150	5.61%	n/a	
Family Coalition	Gerhard Herwig	255	1.24%	n/a	$2,120
Green	Romeo De La Pena	228	1.11%	+0.64%	$865
Progressive Conservative	Cliff Blair	179	0.87%	n/a	
Social Credit	Victoria Kedzierski	114	0.56%	-19.29%	$1,048
Independent	Don Knight	101	0.49%	n/a	$1,245
Communist	George Gidora	62	0.30%	n/a	$503
Natural Law	Ross Ranger	32	0.16%	n/a	$110
Total valid votes		20,512	100.00%		
Total rejected ballots		254	1.22%		
Turnout		20,766	69.40%		

B.C. General Election 1991: Surrey-Green Timbers
Party	Candidate	Votes	%	±	Expenditures
NDP	Sue Hammell	8,708	46.16%	n/a	$32,800
Liberal	Archibald McMurchy	6,324	33.52%	n/a	$4,777
Social Credit	Russ Burtnick	3,744	19.85%	n/a	$35,747
Green	Gjhrard Baisch	89	0.47%	n/a	
Total valid votes		18,865	100.00%		
Total rejected ballots		512	2.64%		
Turnout		19,377	72.04%		

== See also ==
- List of British Columbia provincial electoral districts
- Canadian provincial electoral districts
