= Surrey-Whalley =

Defunct provincial electoral district in British Columbia, Canada

Coordinates: 49.205°N 122.870°W

British Columbia electoral district
- Location in Surrey

Defunct provincial electoral district
- Legislature: Legislative Assembly of British Columbia
- First contested: 1991
- Last contested: 2020

Demographics
- Population (2001): 48,686
- Area (km²): 25.25
- Census division(s): Metro Vancouver
- Census subdivision(s): Surrey

Surrey-Whalley is a former provincial electoral district for the Legislative Assembly of British Columbia, Canada, in use from 1991 to 2024.

Under the 2021 British Columbia electoral redistribution that took effect for the 2024 election, the riding was split along 96 Avenue, with portions to the west becoming part of the new electoral district of Surrey North and portions to the east becoming part of the new electoral district of Surrey City Centre.

== Members of the Legislative Assembly ==
On account of the realignment of electoral boundaries, most incumbents did not represent the entirety of their listed district during the preceding legislative term. The last MLA was Bruce Ralston. He represented the British Columbia New Democratic Party.

Surrey-Whalley
Assembly	Years	Member	Party
Surrey prior to 1986
34th	1986–1991	Joan Smallwood	New Democratic
35th	1991–1996	Joan Smallwood	New Democratic
36th	1996–2001	Joan Smallwood	New Democratic
37th	2001–2004	Elayne Brenzinger	Liberal
37th	2004–2005	Elayne Brenzinger	Independent
37th	2005–2005	Elayne Brenzinger	Democratic Reform
38th	2005–2009	Bruce Ralston	New Democratic
39th	2009–2013	Bruce Ralston	New Democratic
40th	2013–2017	Bruce Ralston	New Democratic
41st	2017–2020	Bruce Ralston	New Democratic
42nd	2020–2024	Bruce Ralston	New Democratic

== Election results ==
Graph of the election results in Surrey-Whalley (minor parties are combined into "Others")

2020 British Columbia general election
Party	Candidate	Votes	%	±%	Expenditures
New Democratic	Bruce Ralston	10,994	70.94	+12.32	$21,604.97
Liberal	Shaukat Khan	4,052	26.15	−3.93	$28,029.77
Vision	Jag Bhandari	228	1.47	–	$0.00
Communist	Ryan Abbott	223	1.44	+0.9	$123.40
Total valid votes		15,497	100.00	–	
Total rejected ballots		236	1.50	+0.62	
Turnout		15,733	40.59	−10.96	
Registered voters		38,764			
New Democratic hold		Swing		+8.13	
Source: Elections BC

2017 British Columbia general election
Party	Candidate	Votes	%	±%	Expenditures
New Democratic	Bruce Ralston	10,315	58.62	−2.81	$59,997
Liberal	Sargy Chima	5,293	30.08	+0.54	$75,151
Green	Rita Anne Fromholt	1,893	10.76	–	$322
Communist	George Gidora	96	0.54	–	$0
Total valid votes		17,597	100.00	–	
Total rejected ballots		157	0.88	−0.56	
Turnout		17,754	51.55	+5.27	
Registered voters		34,440			
Source: Elections BC

2013 British Columbia general election
Party	Candidate	Votes	%	Expenditures
New Democratic	Bruce Ralston	10,405	61.43	$112,496
Liberal	Kuljeet Kaur	5,004	29.54	$34,568
Conservative	Sunny Chohan	1,110	6.55	$40,961
Vision	Jag Bhandari	420	2.48	$9,375
Total valid votes		16,939	100.00	
Total rejected ballots		248	1.44	
Turnout		17,187	46.28	
Source: Elections BC

2009 British Columbia general election
Party	Candidate	Votes
New Democratic	Bruce Ralston	10,453
Liberal	Radhia Benalia	4,083
Green	Bernadette Kennan	1,189

2005 British Columbia general election
Party	Candidate	Votes	%
New Democratic	Bruce Ralston	8,903	55.00
Liberal	Barbara Steele	4,949	30.57
Green	Roy Whyte	1,238	7.65
Democratic Reform	Elayne Brenzinger	607	3.75
Marijuana	Melady Belinda Earl	302	1.87
Independent	Joe Pal	139	0.86
Platinum	Neil Gregory Magnuson	50	0.31
Total		16,188	100.00

B.C. General Election 2001: Surrey-Whalley
Party	Candidate	Votes	%	±	Expenditures
Liberal	Elayne Brenzinger	6,693	45.73%		$53,614
NDP	Joan Smallwood	4,536	30.99%		$42,735
Green	Terry McComas	1,652	11.28%	–	$100
Unity	John A. Conway	838	5.73%		$2,880
Marijuana	Khalid Damien Arnaout	544	3.72%		$394
Reform	Mike Runté	374	2.55%		$7,957
Total valid votes		14,637	100.00%		
Total rejected ballots		85	0.58%		
Turnout		14,722	66.79%		

1996 British Columbia general election
Party	Candidate	Votes	%	Expenditures
New Democratic	Joan K. Smallwood	7,396	50.14%	$37,063
Liberal	Judy Higginbotham	4,576	31.02%	$46,879
Reform	John A. Conway	1,302	8.83%	$6,238
Progressive Democrat	Vlad Marjanovic	968	6.56%	$591
Green	Jens M. Haeusser	243	1.65%	$100
Social Credit	Dora Fehr	115	0.78%	
Libertarian	Donald A. Roberts	82	0.56%	
Natural Law	Valerie Hubert	70	0.47%	$118
Total valid votes		14,752		
Total rejected ballots		147	0.99%	
Turnout		14,899	65.38%	

B.C. General Election 1991: Surrey-Whalley
Party	Candidate	Votes	%	±	Expenditures
NDP	Joan K. Smallwood	7,243	47.77%		$37,199
Liberal	Daphne E. Edwards	4,862	32.06%		$2,676
Social Credit	John A. Conway	2,922	19.27%	–	$27,880
Green	Imtiaz N. Popat	137	0.90%	–	$189
Total valid votes		15,164	100.00%		
Total rejected ballots		340	2.19%		
Turnout		15,504	69.78%		

== See also ==
- List of British Columbia provincial electoral districts
- Canadian provincial electoral districts
