= 36th Parliament of British Columbia =

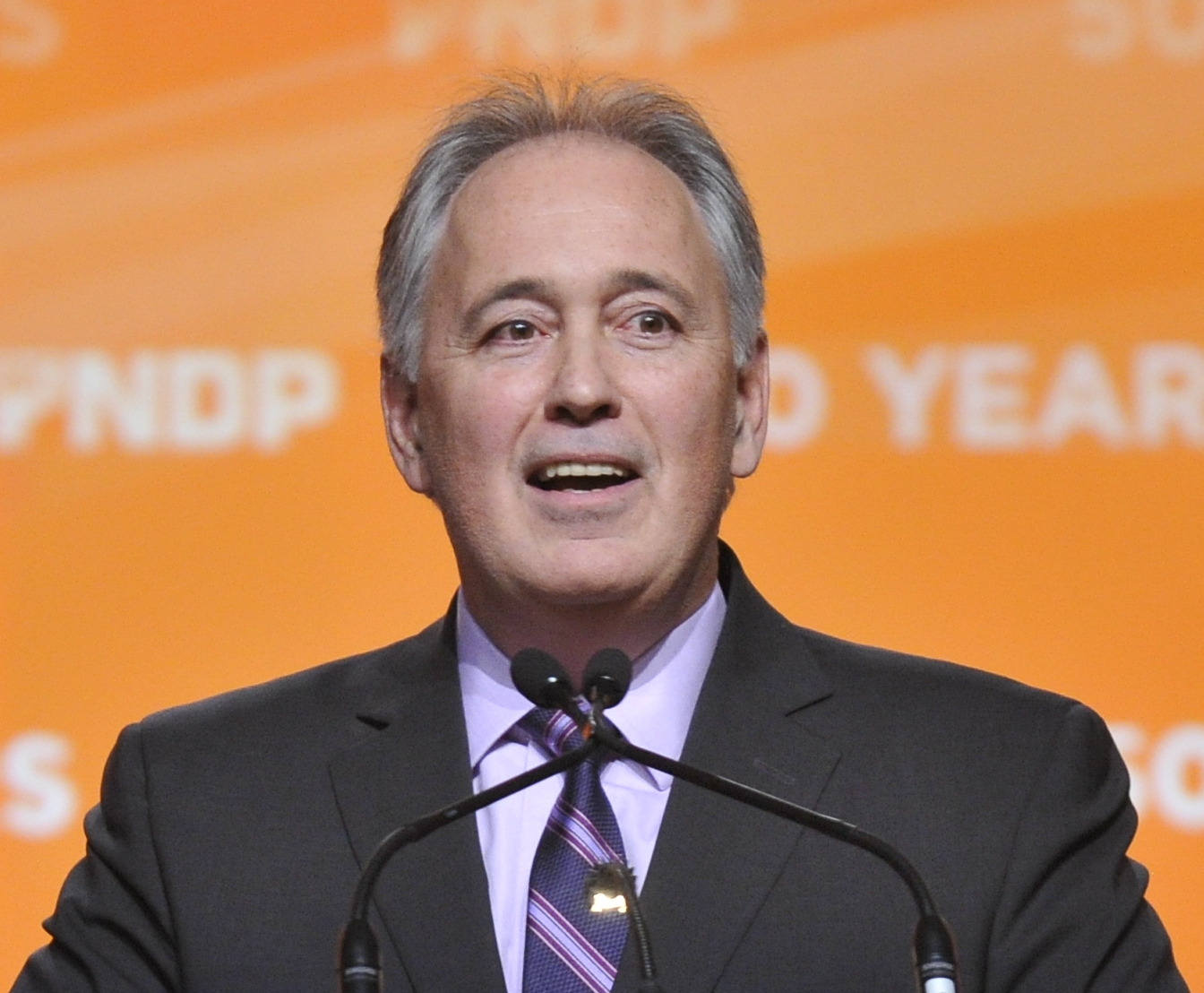
Glen Clark at the NDP convention in 2011.

The 36th Legislative Assembly of British Columbia sat from 1996 to 2001. The members were elected in the British Columbia general election held in May 1996. The New Democratic Party (NDP) led by Glen Clark formed the government. Clark resigned as premier in August 1999; Dan Miller served as interim premier until a leadership election was held in February 2000 where Ujjal Dosanjh became party leader and premier. The Liberals led by Gordon Campbell formed the official opposition.

Dale Lovick served as speaker for the assembly until 1998 when Gretchen Brewin became speaker. Brewin served as speaker until 2000; William James Hartley replaced Brewin as speaker for the remaining sessions.

== Members of the 36th Parliament ==
The following members were elected to the assembly in 1996:

Member	Electoral district	Party	First elected / previously elected	No.# of term(s)
John van Dongen	Abbotsford	Liberal	1995	2nd term
Gerard A. Janssen	Alberni	NDP	1988	3rd term
Bill Goodacre	Bulkley Valley-Stikine	NDP	1996	1st term
Fred G. Randall	Burnaby-Edmonds	NDP	1996	1st term
Pietro Calendino	Burnaby North	NDP	1996	1st term
Joan Sawicki	Burnaby-Willingdon	NDP	1991	2nd term
John D. Wilson	Cariboo North	Liberal	1996	1st term
David Zirnhelt	Cariboo South	NDP	1989	3rd term
Barry Penner	Chilliwack	Liberal	1996	1st term
Jim Doyle	Columbia River-Revelstoke	NDP	1991	2nd term
Evelyn Gillespie	Comox Valley	NDP	1996	1st term
John Massey Cashore	Coquitlam-Maillardville	NDP	1986	3rd term
Jan Pullinger	Cowichan-Ladysmith	NDP	1989	3rd term
Reni Masi	Delta North	Liberal	1996	1st term
Fred Gingell	Delta South	Liberal	1991	2nd term
Val Roddick (1999)	Delta South	Liberal	1999	1st term
Moe Sihota	Esquimalt-Metchosin	NDP	1986	3rd term
Rich Coleman	Fort Langley-Aldergrove	Liberal	1996	1st term
Cathy McGregor	Kamloops	NDP	1996	1st term
Kevin Krueger	Kamloops-North Thompson	Liberal	1996	1st term
Erda Walsh	Kootenay	NDP	1996	1st term
Lynn Stephens	Langley	Liberal	1991	2nd term
Rick F.G. Kasper	Malahat-Juan de Fuca	NDP	1991	2nd term
Rick F.G. Kasper	Malahat-Juan de Fuca	Independent	1991	2nd term
Bill Hartley	Maple Ridge-Pitt Meadows	NDP	1991	2nd term
Michael de Jong	Matsqui	Liberal	1994	2nd term
Dennis Streifel	Mission-Kent	NDP	1991	2nd term
Dale Lovick	Nanaimo	NDP	1986	3rd term
Corky Evans	Nelson-Creston	NDP	1991	2nd term
Graeme Bowbrick	New Westminster	NDP	1996	1st term
A. Dan Miller	North Coast	NDP	1986	3rd term
Glenn Robertson	North Island	NDP	1996	1st term
Katherine Whittred	North Vancouver-Lonsdale	Liberal	1996	1st term
Daniel Jarvis	North Vancouver-Seymour	Liberal	1991	2nd term
Ida Chong	Oak Bay-Gordon Head	Liberal	1996	1st term
Bill Barisoff	Okanagan-Boundary	Liberal	1996	1st term
John Weisbeck	Okanagan East	Liberal	1996	1st term
Rick Thorpe	Okanagan-Penticton	Liberal	1996	1st term
April Sanders	Okanagan-Vernon	Liberal	1996	1st term
Sindi Hawkins	Okanagan West	Liberal	1996	1st term
Paul Reitsma	Parksville-Qualicum	Liberal	1996	1st term
Paul Reitsma	Parksville-Qualicum	Independent	1996	1st term
Judith Reid (1998)	Parksville-Qualicum	Liberal	1998	1st term
Richard Neufeld	Peace River North	Reform (Note: First elected as a Social Credit candidate)	1991	2nd term
Richard Neufeld	Peace River North	Liberal	1991	2nd term
Jack S. Weisgerber	Peace River South	Reform	1986	3rd term
Jack S. Weisgerber	Peace River South	Independent	1986	3rd term
Michael C. Farnworth	Port Coquitlam	NDP	1991	2nd term
Christy Clark	Port Moody-Burnaby Mountain	Liberal	1996	1st term
Gordon Wilson	Powell River-Sunshine Coast	Progressive Democratic	1991 (Note: First elected as a Liberal)	2nd term
Gordon Wilson	Powell River-Sunshine Coast	NDP	1991	2nd term
Lois R. Boone	Prince George-Mount Robson	NDP	1986	3rd term
Paul Ramsey	Prince George North	NDP	1991	2nd term
Paul Nettleton	Prince George-Omineca	Liberal	1996	1st term
Douglas Symons	Richmond Centre	Liberal	1991	2nd term
Linda Reid	Richmond East	Liberal	1991	2nd term
Geoff Plant	Richmond-Steveston	Liberal	1996	1st term
Ed Conroy	Rossland-Trail	NDP	1991	2nd term
Murray Robert Coell	Saanich North and the Islands	Liberal	1996	1st term
Andrew Petter	Saanich South	NDP	1991	2nd term
George Abbott	Shuswap	Liberal	1996	1st term
Helmut Giesbrecht	Skeena	NDP	1991	2nd term
Bonnie McKinnon	Surrey-Cloverdale	Liberal	1996	1st term
Bonnie McKinnon	Surrey-Cloverdale	Independent	1996	1st term
Sue Hammell	Surrey-Green Timbers	NDP	1991	2nd term
Penny Priddy	Surrey-Newton	NDP	1991	2nd term
Joan K. Smallwood	Surrey-Whalley	NDP	1986	3rd term
Wilf Hurd	Surrey-White Rock	Liberal	1991	2nd term
Gordon Hogg (1997)	Surrey-White Rock	Liberal	1997	1st term
Tim Stevenson	Vancouver-Burrard	NDP	1996	1st term
Ian Waddell	Vancouver-Fairview	NDP	1996	1st term
Joy MacPhail	Vancouver-Hastings	NDP	1991	2nd term
Ujjal Dosanjh	Vancouver-Kensington	NDP	1991	2nd term
Glen Clark	Vancouver-Kingsway	NDP	1986	3rd term
Val J. Anderson	Vancouver-Langara	Liberal	1991	2nd term
Gary Farrell-Collins	Vancouver-Little Mountain	Liberal	1991	2nd term
Jenny Wai Ching Kwan	Vancouver-Mount Pleasant	NDP	1996	1st term
Gordon Campbell	Vancouver-Point Grey	Liberal	1994	2nd term
Colin Hansen	Vancouver-Quilchena	Liberal	1996	1st term
Gretchen Brewin	Victoria-Beacon Hill	NDP	1991	2nd term
Steve Orcherton	Victoria-Hillside	NDP	1996	1st term
Jeremy Dalton	West Vancouver-Capilano	Liberal	1991	2nd term
Jeremy Dalton	West Vancouver-Capilano	Independent	1991	2nd term
Ted Nebbeling	West Vancouver-Garibaldi	Liberal	1996	1st term
Harry Lali	Yale-Lillooet	NDP	1991	2nd term

== Party standings ==
Affiliation	Members
New Democratic	39
Liberal	33
Reform	2
Progressive Democrat	1
Total	75
Government Majority	3

== By-elections ==
By-elections were held to replace members for various reasons:

Electoral district	Member elected	Party	Election date	Reason
Surrey-White Rock	Gordon Hogg	Liberal	September 15, 1997	Wilf Hurd resigned May 2, 1997
Parksville-Qualicum	Judith Reid	Liberal	December 14, 1998	Paul Reitsma resigned June 23, 1998
Delta South	Val Roddick	Liberal	December 7, 1999	Fred Gingell died July 6, 1999

== Other changes ==
- Richard Neufeld joins the Liberals on October 7, 1997.
- Jack Weisgerber becomes an Independent on November 28, 1997.
- Paul Reitsma was expelled from the Liberal caucus on April 1, 1998, and resigned from the Liberal party the following day. He resigns from the legislature on June 23.
- Gordon Wilson joins the NDP on January 29, 1999.
- Rick Kasper becomes an Independent on October 10, 2000.
- Jeremy Dalton becomes an Independent on January 11, 2001.
- Bonnie McKinnon becomes and Independent on March 5, 2001.
