= 1991 British Columbia recall and initiative referendum =

The British Columbia Recall and Initiative Referendum was a referendum held in British Columbia on October 17, 1991. It was concurrent with that year's general election. The referendum posed two questions. They were on whether elected officials should be able to be recalled and whether voters should be given a citizen's initiative. Both questions were decisively approved with over 80% of the electorate voting yes to both questions.

== Lead up ==
British Columbia has had several referendums in its history. A previous bill, the Direct Legislation Act, was passed by the Oliver government in 1919. the Direct Democracy Act was given royal assent in March of that year, but was never proclaimed. A similar statute was struck down by the Manitoba Court of Appeals later that year. These combined to leave the BC law in legislative limbo until it was removed in a 1924 statute consolidation.

A promise to hold referendums was included in the British Columbia Social Credit Party (Socred) government's speech from the throne in April 1990. In preparation, the Socreds had invited two experts from California familiar with recall and initiative to their annual convention. Appropriate legislation was introduced on July 5, 1990.

The two questions were:

A: Should the voters be given the right, by legislation, to vote between elections for the removal of their member of the Legislative Assembly?

B: Should the voters be given the right, by legislation, to propose questions that the Government of British Columbia must submit to voters by referendum?

Both of the questions were announced by Premier Rita Johnston during a news conference on September 5, 1991, although by then they were an open secret. NDP leader Mike Harcourt criticized the timing, saying that the Socreds had moved too slowly in launching the proposals. Liberal leader Gordon Wilson also criticized the referendum, saying that it was intended to divert attention away from the scandal-plagued Socreds. In response, Johnston said she could not comment on either timing or structure for the proposals because they would be decided after the referendum.

The referendum was run by Attorney-General Russ Fraser. The total cost was 1.7 million dollars. The cost includes information pamphlets, advertising, toll-free information telephone lines, and costs related to running the referendum.

The referendum also got caught up in the campaign going on at the same time. Both Premier Johnston and British Columbia New Democratic Party (NDP) leader Harcourt announced that they would be voting yes in the referendum.

== Results ==
There was overwhelming support for both questions. Support was over 80% of yes votes for both questions. However, more than nine percent of ballots for question A were rejected, and more than eleven percent were rejected for question B. Turnout was slightly less than that in the general election.

=== Question A: Recall ===
District	Yes	Percentage	No	Percentage	Rejected
Abbotsford	14214	82.46	3023	17.54	1571
Alberni	10092	83.81	1949	16.19	1716
Bulkley Valley-Stikine	8077	80.18	1996	19.82	1220
Burnaby-Edmonds	16003	82.57	3378	17.43	2247
Burnaby North	15374	83.22	3099	16.78	2173
Burnaby-Willingdon	18091	81.9	3999	18.1	2215
Cariboo North	9899	85.65	1658	14.35	1294
Cariboo South	10606	82.5	2249	17.5	1439
Chilliwack	16527	82.48	3510	17.52	2372
Columbia River-Revelstoke	10237	81.78	2281	18.22	1531
Comox Valley	18435	75.7	5918	24.3	2424
Coquitlam-Maillardville	18311	82.86	3788	17.14	2026
Cowichan-Ladysmith	16652	80.54	4024	19.46	2319
Delta North	16784	84.74	3022	15.26	1517
Delta South	17299	82.11	3770	17.89	1226
Esquimalt-Metchosin	17539	82.68	3674	17.32	1915
Fort Langley-Aldergrove	15998	84.32	2975	15.68	1253
Kamloops	14595	76.55	4471	23.45	1587
Kamloops-North Thompson	10876	77.86	3093	22.14	1135
Kootenay	11770	81.9	2602	18.1	1651
Langley	14301	83.97	2731	16.03	1628
Malahat-Juan de Fuca	14933	83.67	2911	16.31	2046
Maple Ridge-Pitt Meadows	19897	83.01	4073	16.99	1977
Matsqui	13838	81.91	3056	18.09	2046
Mission-Kent	12657	80.24	3117	19.76	1680
Nanaimo	15919	79.64	4069	20.36	2189
Nelson-Creston	13131	78.50	3597	21.50	1869
New Westminster	15568	81.39	3560	18.61	2019
North Coast	7631	80.83	1810	19.17	1288
North Island	12185	78.53	3332	21.47	1385
North Vancouver-Lonsdale	15214	83.53	3000	16.47	1749
North Vancouver-Seymour	18469	80.68	4423	19.32	1224
Oak Bay-Gordon Head	17982	73.08	6624	26.92	2299
Okanagan-Boundary	10627	77.94	3008	22.06	2013
Okanagan East	16477	81.05	3852	18.95	2324
Okanagan-Penticton	15529	78.04	4369	21.96	2299
Okanagan-Vernon	16602	79.65	4242	20.35	2206
Okanagan West	20447	80.58	4929	19.42	2480
Parksville-Qualicum	18866	79.54	4852	20.46	2499
Peace River North	7897	82.66	1657	17.34	1275
Peace River South	9706	86.15	1561	13.85	1436
Port Coquitlam	19931	84.68	3606	15.32	1990
Port Moody-Burnaby Mountain	17662	82	3877	18	430
Powell River-Sunshine Coast	14294	77.4	4174	22.6	1606
Prince George-Mount Robson	8668	83.05	1769	16.95	1201
Prince George North	11553	83.09	2351	16.91	368
Prince George-Omineca	10170	82.66	2133	17.34	1139
Richmond Centre	13260	80.74	3164	19.26	1484
Richmond East	12764	82.34	2737	17.66	1757
Richmond-Steveston	13098	80	3275	20	1314
Rossland-Trail	11886	81.92	2624	18.08	1653
Saanich North and the Islands	18911	77.4	5523	22.6	1786
Saanich South	17153	79.15	4518	20.85	1527
Shuswap	15531	79.46	4014	20.54	2448
Skeena	8668	78.86	2324	21.14	1031
Surrey-Cloverdale	18698	84.27	3490	15.73	1726
Surrey-Green Timbers	15171	86.88	2291	13.12	1869
Surrey-Newton	19214	85.88	3158	14.12	2296
Surrey-Whalley	12110	86.32	1919	13.68	1339
Surrey-White Rock	21702	82.62	4566	17.38	2622
Vancouver-Burrard	14233	79.22	3734	20.78	1613
Vancouver-Fraserview	13893	84.05	2636	15.95	2054
Vancouver-Hastings	13562	84.1	2564	15.9	2526
Vancouver-Kensington	13718	85.16	2390	14.84	2204
Vancouver-Kingsway	13033	86.16	2093	13.84	2463
Vancouver-Langara	14846	80.24	3656	19.76	1454
Vancouver-Little Mountain	16046	76.13	5032	23.87	2166
Vancouver-Mount Pleasant	11635	81.82	2586	18.18	2310
Vancouver-Point Grey	16536	71.62	6553	28.38	1623
Vancouver-Quilchena	15498	71.6	6148	28.4	1593
Victoria-Beacon Hill	15671	75.38	5117	24.62	2599
Victoria-Hillside	16102	79.59	4128	20.41	1976
West Vancouver-Capilano	16842	78.01	4747	21.99	1705
West Vancouver-Garibaldi	14168	79.01	3765	20.99	1376
Yale-Lillooet	11225	83.14	2277	16.86	1883
Total	1090023	80.89	257522	19.11	135363

=== Question B: Initiative ===
District	Yes	Percentage	No	Percentage	Rejected
Abbotsford	14335	84.78	2573	15.22	1900
Alberni	10084	86.36	1593	13.64	2080
Bulkley Valley-Stikine	8221	83.53	1621	16.47	1451
Burnaby-Edmonds	15944	84.35	2959	15.65	2727
Burnaby North	15359	84.9	2731	15.1	2556
Burnaby-Willingdon	18185	84.03	3456	15.97	2664
Cariboo North	9923	87.86	1371	12.14	1557
Cariboo South	10746	85.78	1781	14.22	1767
Chilliwack	16642	85.33	2862	14.67	2905
Columbia River-Revelstoke	10495	86.24	1674	13.76	1880
Comox Valley	18996	79.72	4833	20.28	2948
Coquitlam-Maillardville	18468	85.19	3210	14.81	2447
Cowichan-Ladysmith	16905	83.89	3247	16.11	2843
Delta North	16385	84	3122	16	1816
Delta South	16880	81.16	3918	18.84	1497
Esquimalt-Metchosin	17591	84.33	3268	15.67	2269
Fort Langley-Aldergrove	16000	85.95	2615	14.05	1611
Kamloops	15257	81.63	3433	18.37	1963
Kamloops-North Thompson	11212	82.13	2439	17.87	1453
Kootenay	12187	87.39	1758	12.61	2078
Langley	14244	85.42	2431	14.58	1994
Malahat-Juan de Fuca	15070	85.7	2514	14.3	2306
Maple Ridge-Pitt Meadows	20090	85.52	3401	14.48	2456
Matsqui	13963	85.35	2397	14.65	2995
Mission-Kent	12874	83.45	2553	16.55	2027
Nanaimo	16154	82.5	3426	17.5	2597
Nelson-Creston	13464	82.66	2824	17.34	2309
New Westminster	15731	84.07	2981	15.93	2435
North Coast	7759	84.05	1472	15.95	1498
North Island	12793	84.14	2412	15.86	1697
North Vancouver-Lonsdale	15275	85.51	2588	14.49	2100
North Vancouver-Seymour	18420	81.33	4229	18.67	1467
Oak Bay-Gordon Head	17701	73.38	6420	26.62	2784
Okanagan-Boundary	10611	80.36	2594	19.64	2594
Okanagan East	16854	84.98	2980	15.02	2819
Okanagan-Penticton	15560	80.7	3721	19.3	3662
Okanagan-Vernon	16961	83.65	3314	16.35	2775
Okanagan West	20684	84.23	3874	15.77	4298
Parksville-Qualicum	18999	81.66	4266	18.34	2952
Peace River North	7959	85.52	1348	14.48	1522
Peace River South	9759	88.86	1223	11.14	1721
Port Coquitlam	20260	86.99	3029	13.01	2238
Port Moody-Burnaby Mountain	17895	84.03	3402	15.97	672
Powell River-Sunshine Coast	14847	82.4	3171	17.6	2056
Prince George-Mount Robson	8588	84.64	1559	15.36	1491
Prince George North	11498	84.35	2133	15.65	641
Prince George-Omineca	10188	84.29	1899	15.71	1355
Richmond Centre	13347	82.71	2791	17.29	1770
Richmond East	12782	84.41	2361	15.59	2115
Richmond-Steveston	13222	81.97	2909	18.03	1556
Rossland-Trail	11989	85.17	2088	14.83	2086
Saanich North and the Islands	18816	78.37	5192	21.63	2212
Saanich South	17053	79.55	4383	20.45	1762
Shuswap	15661	82.58	3304	17.42	3028
Skeena	8987	83.63	1759	16.37	1277
Surrey-Cloverdale	18600	85.44	3169	14.56	2145
Surrey-Green Timbers	14733	86.38	2324	13.62	2274
Surrey-Newton	18928	86.18	3035	13.82	2705
Surrey-Whalley	11933	86.63	1841	13.37	1594
Surrey-White Rock	20960	81.74	4681	18.26	3249
Vancouver-Burrard	14232	80.18	3518	19.82	1830
Vancouver-Fraserview	13713	85.01	2418	14.99	2452
Vancouver-Hastings	13343	85.34	2292	14.66	3017
Vancouver-Kensington	13428	86.34	2124	13.66	2760
Vancouver-Kingsway	12688	87.26	1852	12.74	3049
Vancouver-Langara	14901	81.73	3332	18.27	1723
Vancouver-Little Mountain	16366	78.75	4419	21.25	2459
Vancouver-Mount Pleasant	11530	84.25	2156	15.75	2845
Vancouver-Point Grey	16972	74.38	5847	25.62	1893
Vancouver-Quilchena	15568	72.91	5783	27.09	1888
Victoria-Beacon Hill	15567	76.8	4703	23.2	3117
Victoria-Hillside	16146	81.58	3645	18.42	2415
West Vancouver-Capilano	16764	78.68	4542	21.32	1988
West Vancouver-Garibaldi	14258	80.45	3464	19.55	1587
Yale-Lillooet	11378	86.53	1771	13.47	2236
Total	1095100	83.02	223902	16.98	163906

== Aftermath ==
British Columbia's legislation made a referendum binding only on the government that called it. As the Socreds had been defeated, the incoming NDP government was not required to enable recall and initiative. Nevertheless, Premier-elect Mike Harcourt announced that his government would be bound by the results. As a consequence, the Recall and Initiative Act was passed and entered into force on February 24, 1995. In 1998, MLA Paul Reitsma resigned his seat when it appeared that a recall petition would be successful and he could be the first person recalled under the legislation.

As of April 2023, according to Elections BC the Recall and Initiative Act has been invoked:

- 29 times with registered Recall petitions, all of which are deemed to have failed;
- 14 times with registered Initiative petitions, of which only one passed (see 2011 British Columbia sales tax referendum).

== See also ==
- Politics of British Columbia
- Referendums in Canada
- William Aberhart, the first politician in Canada ever to be subject to a recall campaign
