= Richard Neufeld =

Canadian politician (born 1944)

The Honourable Richard Neufeld

Minister of Energy, Mines and Petroleum Resources of British Columbia (Note: Office known as "Minister of Energy and Mines" from 2001 to 2005.)
- In office June 5, 2001 – January 19, 2009
- Premier: Gordon Campbell
- Preceded by: Glenn Robertson
- Succeeded by: Blair Lekstrom
Parliamentary constituencies
Canadian Senator from British Columbia
In office January 2, 2009 – November 6, 2019
Nominated by	Stephen Harper
Appointed by	Michaëlle Jean
Preceded by	Pat Carney
Succeeded by	Margo Lainne Greenwood (2022)
Member of the British Columbia Legislative Assembly for Peace River North
In office October 17, 1991 – January 19, 2009
Preceded by	Tony Brummet
Succeeded by	Pat Pimm

Mayor of Fort Nelson
- In office 1981–1986

Personal details
- Born: November 6, 1944 (age 81) Lethbridge, Alberta, Canada
- Party: Conservative
- Other political affiliations: British Columbia Social Credit Party (1991-1994); Reform Party of British Columbia (1994-1997); British Columbia Liberal Party (1997-2009)
- Spouse: Montana Currie

Richard Neufeld (born November 6, 1944) is a former Canadian politician who served as a Senator for British Columbia from 2009 to 2019. He was previously a member of the Legislative Assembly of British Columbia, representing the electoral district of Peace River North from 1991 to 2009, and served as Minister of Energy, Mines and Petroleum Resources in the cabinet of Premier Gordon Campbell.

== Background ==
Born in Lethbridge, Alberta, Neufeld was adopted by his parents from an orphanage, and grew up in the hamlet of Grassy Lake before moving to Fort St. John, British Columbia. He worked as a truck driver, then became a district manager with Tompkins Contracting. He was an alderman on the Fort Nelson council from 1978 to 1981, then served as mayor from 1981 to 1986.

He and his wife Montana Currie have four children.

== Provincial politics ==
Neufeld ran in the 1991 BC general election as a Social Credit Party (Socred) candidate in Peace River North, receiving 5,758 votes (54.79% of total valid votes) in a field of five candidates to become the riding's member of the legislative assembly (MLA). He was one of only seven Socred candidates elected that year; with the formerly dominant Socreds collapsing, Neufeld defected to the BC Reform Party in March 1994.

He was re-elected in Peace River North as a BC Reform candidate in the 1996 provincial election, receiving 5,299 votes (48.41% of total valid votes) in a field of six candidates. He was one of two BC Reform candidates to be elected, the other being party leader Jack Weisgerber. BC Reform's presence was blamed for splitting the centre-right vote, allowing the New Democratic Party to eke out a majority despite coming second in the popular vote behind the Liberals. Wilf Hanni succeeded Weisgerber as Reform leader in August 1997; following a conflict with Hanni, Neufeld defected to the Liberals that October. During this time in the Official Opposition he served as energy, mines and northern development critic.

In the 2001 general election Neufeld was re-elected in Peace River North as the BC Liberal candidate, receiving 6,629 votes (73.22% of total valid votes) in a field of four candidates. With the Liberals gaining power, Neufeld was appointed Minister of Energy and Mines on June 5, 2001 by Premier Gordon Campbell. In this role, Neufeld was at the centre of the fray regarding the "re-regulation" of BC Hydro, which involves privatization of some of that Crown corporation. He also advocated for the increased use of coal power, and promoted allowing a scientific review of offshore oil and gas. His term as Minister of Energy and Mines was marked by significant growth in the oil and gas, and mining sectors.

After winning re-election in 2005 by receiving 5,498 votes (59.37% of total valid votes) in a field of four candidates, he remained in the Campbell ministry as Minister of Energy, Mines and Petroleum Resources.

== Senate career ==
On December 22, 2008, it was announced that Neufeld would be appointed to the Senate of Canada on the advice of Prime Minister Stephen Harper, sitting as a Conservative. He assumed office on January 2, 2009, and officially resigned as MLA and provincial cabinet minister on the 19th of that month. He served in a number of committees during his time in the upper house, including as vice-chair of the Standing Senate Committee on National Finance, and as chair of the Standing Senate Committee on Energy, the Environment and Natural Resources.

Upon reaching age 75 on November 6, 2019, Neufeld was aged out of the Senate per constitutionally-enshrined mandatory retirement rules.

== Honours ==
- He was awarded the Freedom of the City of Fort St. John on 24 June 2019, and formally received the honour on 26 November 2021.
