= Peace River South =

Provincial electoral district in British Columbia, Canada

Coordinates: 55.65°N 120.18°W

British Columbia electoral district
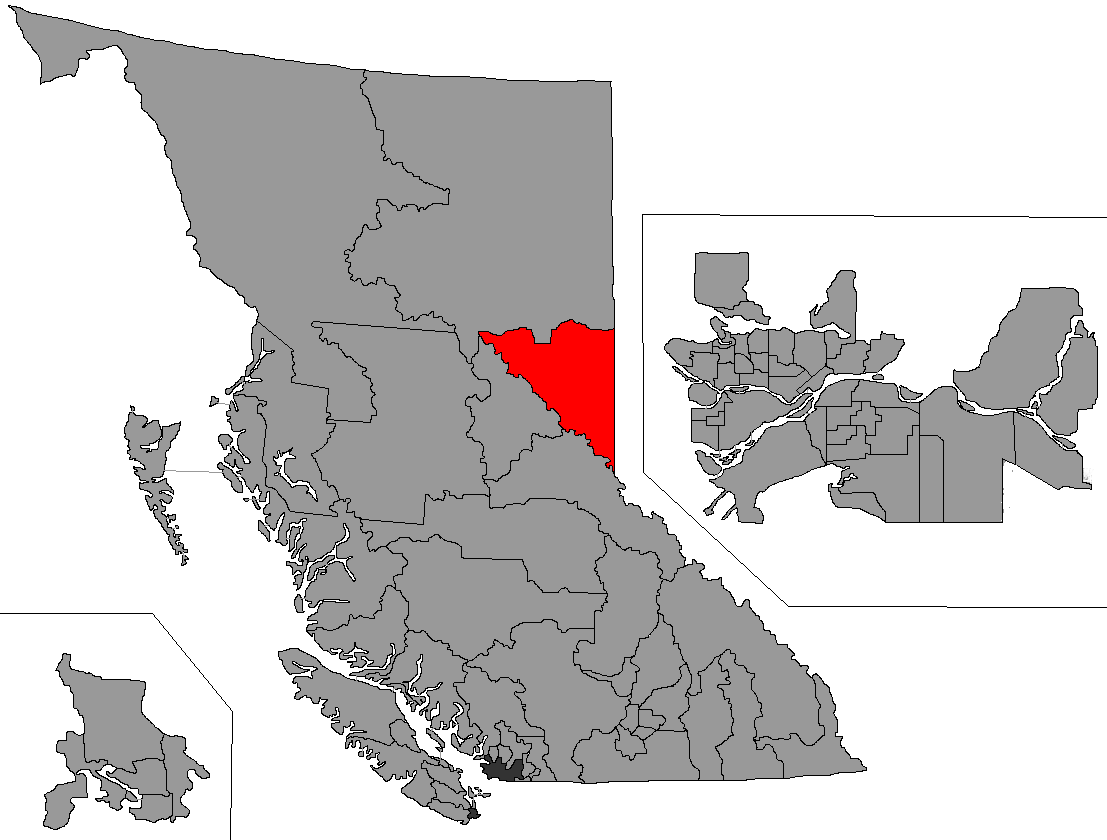

Provincial electoral district
- Legislature: Legislative Assembly of British Columbia
MLA
Larry Neufeld
Conservative
- District created: 1955
- First contested: 1956
- Last contested: 2026

Demographics
- Population (2001): 28,097
- Area (km²): 32,085
- Pop. density (per km²): 0.88

Peace River South is a provincial electoral district for the Legislative Assembly of British Columbia, Canada. It was created under the name South Peace River by the Constitution Amendment Act, 1955, which split the old riding of Peace River into northern and southern portions for the 1956 BC election. Its current name has been in use since 1991.

== Geography ==
As of the 2020 provincial election, Peace River South comprises the southern portion of the Peace River Regional District, located in eastern British Columbia. The electoral district is bordered by Alberta in the east. Communities in the electoral district consist of Dawson Creek, Chetwynd, Tumbler Ridge, and Pouce Coupe.

== Member of the Legislative Assembly ==
The riding's current member of the Legislative Assembly (MLA) is Larry Neufeld. He was first elected in 2024 and represents the Conservative Party of British Columbia.

This riding has elected the following MLAs:

Assembly	Years	Member	Party
South Peace River; Riding created from Peace River
25th	1956–1960	Stanley Carnell	Social Credit
26th	1960–1963	Stanley Carnell	Social Credit
27th	1963–1966	Stanley Carnell	Social Credit
28th	1966–1969	Donald M. Phillips	Social Credit
29th	1969–1972	Donald Albert Marshall	Social Credit
29th	1972–1972	Donald Albert Marshall	Progressive Conservative
30th	1972–1975	Donald M. Phillips	Social Credit
31st	1975–1979	Donald M. Phillips	Social Credit
32nd	1979–1983	Donald M. Phillips	Social Credit
33rd	1983–1986	Donald M. Phillips	Social Credit
34th	1986–1991	Jack Weisgerber	Social Credit
Peace River South
35th	1991–1995	Jack Weisgerber	Social Credit
35th	1995–1996	Jack Weisgerber	Reform
36th	1996–1997	Jack Weisgerber	Reform
36th	1997–2001	Jack Weisgerber	Independent
37th	2001–2005	Blair Lekstrom	Liberal
38th	2005–2009	Blair Lekstrom	Liberal
39th	2009–2010	Blair Lekstrom	Liberal
39th	2010–2011	Blair Lekstrom	Independent
39th	2011–2013	Blair Lekstrom	Liberal
40th	2013–2017	Mike Bernier	Liberal
41st	2017–2020	Mike Bernier	Liberal
42nd	2020–2023	Mike Bernier	Liberal
42nd	2023–2024	Mike Bernier	BC United
43rd	2024–2026	Larry Neufeld	Conservative
44th	2026–present	Larry Neufeld	Conservative

== Election results ==
2026 British Columbia general election
** Preliminary results — Not yet official **
Party	Candidate	Votes	%	±%
Conservative	Larry Neufeld	6,070	77.69	+7.85
New Democratic	Marsha Rose Dufresne	1,201	15.37	+9.77
Unaffiliated	Helen Scott	542	6.94	
Total valid votes		7,813	99.64	
Total rejected ballots		28	0.36	+0.21
Turnout		7,841		
Registered voters				
Source: Elections BC
Conservative hold		Swing		–0.96

2024 British Columbia general election
Party	Candidate	Votes	%	±%	Expenditures
Conservative	Larry Neufeld	7,182	69.84	+39.32	$44,112.40
Unaffiliated	Mike Bernier	2,525	24.56	-26.64	$12,313.25
New Democratic	Marshall Bigsby	576	5.60	-10.04	$1,286.83
Total valid votes/expense limit		10,283	99.85	–	$71,700.08
Total rejected ballots		15	0.15	–	
Turnout		10,298	56.56	+14.91	
Registered voters		18,206			
Conservative gain from BC United		Swing		+32.98 (Note: Swing against BC United incumbent Mike Bernier, standing for re-election as an unaffiliated candidate.)	
Source: Elections BC

2020 British Columbia general election
Party	Candidate	Votes	%	±%	Expenditures
Liberal	Mike Bernier	3,862	51.19	−24.78	$11,466.78
Conservative	Kathleen Connolly	2,303	30.53	–	$0.00
New Democratic	Corey Grizz Longley	1,180	15.64	−8.39	$1,321.80
Wexit	Dorothy Sharon Smith	199	2.84	–	$538.35
Total valid votes		7,544	100.00	–	
Total rejected ballots		42	0.56		
Turnout		7,586	41.66		
Registered voters		18,211			
Source: Elections BC

2017 British Columbia general election
Party	Candidate	Votes	%	±%	Expenditures
Liberal	Mike Bernier	6,637	75.97	+29.24	$26,175
New Democratic	Stephanie Goudie	2,099	24.03	+2.79	$8,179
Total valid votes		8,736	100.00		
Total rejected ballots		131	1.48		
Turnout		8,867	49.97		
Registered voters		17,746			
Source: Elections BC

2013 British Columbia general election
Party	Candidate	Votes	%	±%	Expenditures
Liberal	Mike Bernier	4,373	46.73	-16.35	$107,254
Conservative	Kurt Zane Peats	2,546	27.21	-	$26,829
New Democratic	Darwin Wren	1,988	21.24	-5.79	$36,616
Independent	Tyrel Andrew Pohl	451	4.82	-	$2,668
Total valid votes		9,358	100.00		
Total rejected ballots		37	0.39		
Turnout		9,395	49.89		
Liberal hold		Swing		–21.78	
Source: Elections BC

2011 British Columbia sales tax referendum
Side	Votes	%
Yes	4,073	58.82
No	2,852	41.18

2009 British Columbia general election
Party	Candidate	Votes	%	±%	Expenditures
Liberal	Blair Lekstrom	4,801	63.08	+5.34	$83,241
New Democratic	Pat Shaw	2,057	27.03	–5.73	$13,686
Green	Grant Fraser	553	7.00	–2.50	$350
Independent	Donna Young	220	2.89	–	$1,976
Total valid votes		7,611	100.0		
Total rejected ballots		44	0.57		
Turnout		7,655	44.0		
Liberal hold		Swing		+5.54	

2009 British Columbia electoral reform referendum
Side	Votes	%
FPTP	4,884	66.31
BC-STV	2,481	33.69

2005 British Columbia general election
Party	Candidate	Votes	%	±%	Expenditures
Liberal	Blair Lekstrom	5,810	57.74	–6.46	$67,507
New Democratic	Pat Shaw	3,296	32.76	+25.07	$19,318
Green	Ariel Lade	956	9.50	+5.42	$200
Total valid votes		10,062	100.0		
Total rejected ballots		71	0.71		
Turnout		10,133	56.3		
Liberal hold		Swing		–15.76	

2005 British Columbia electoral reform referendum
Side	Votes	%
Yes	5,279	54.24
No	4,453	45.76

2001 British Columbia general election
Party	Candidate	Votes	%	±%	Expenditures
Liberal	Blair Lekstrom	6,393	64.20	+33.35	$58,198
Social Credit	Grant Mitton	1,726	17.33	+13.64	$12,655
New Democratic	Elmer Kabush	767	7.69	–23.19	$865
Marijuana	Michelle Rainey-Fenkarek	444	4.45	–	$3,288
Green	Stacey Dean Lajeunesse	407	4.08	+2.89	$100
Unity	Garret Golhof	225	2.25	–	$1,540
Total valid votes		9,962	100.0		
Total rejected ballots		34	0.34		
Turnout		9,996	62.37		
Liberal gain from Reform		Swing		+9.86	

1996 British Columbia general election
Party	Candidate	Votes	%	±%	Expenditures
Reform	Jack Weisgerber	3,901	31.89	–5.32	$15,351
New Democratic	Patrick Michiel	3,778	30.88	–0.10	$19,349
Liberal	Brian Haddow	3,774	30.85	+2.55	$22,822
Social Credit	Aime Girard	452	3.69	–33.52	$7,548
Progressive Democrat	Wade Alexander Allan	183	1.50	–	$100
Green	Shane Hartnell	145	1.19	–2.32	$100
Total valid votes		12,233	100.0		
Total rejected ballots		49	0.40		
Turnout		12,282	62.60		
Reform gain from Social Credit		Swing		+16.00	

1991 British Columbia general election
Party	Candidate	Votes	%	Expenditures
Social Credit	Jack Weisgerber	4,617	37.21	$24,824
New Democratic	Anne Matheson	3,844	30.98	$16,578
Liberal	Marcheta D. N. Leoppky	3,512	28.30	$3,345
Green	Hermann E. Bruns	435	3.51	$1,394
Total valid votes		12,408	100.0	
Total rejected ballots		308	2.42	
Turnout		12,716	69.72	

Question A: Recall
Side	Votes	%
Yes	9,706	86.15
No	1,561	13.85

Question B: Ballot Initiatives
Side	Votes	%
Yes	9,759	88.86
No	1,223	11.14

== See also ==
- List of British Columbia provincial electoral districts
- Canadian provincial electoral districts
