= Popular initiative =

Popular voter petition systems

A popular initiative, or people's initiative (also citizens' initiative, or civic initiative) is a form of direct democracy by which a petition meeting certain hurdles can force a legal procedure on a proposition.

In direct initiative, the proposition is put directly to a plebiscite or referendum, also called a popular initiated referendum or citizen-initiated referendum.

In an indirect initiative, the proposed measure is first referred to the legislature, and then if the proposed law is rejected by the legislature, the government may be forced to put the proposition to a referendum. The proposition may be on federal level law, statute, constitutional amendment, charter amendment, local ordinance, obligate the executive or legislature to consider the subject by submitting it to the order of the day. In contrast, a popular referendum that allows voters only to repeal existing legislation.

The hurdles the petition has to meet vary between countries, typically a certain number of signatures by registered voters, to prevent a flood of frivolous measures on the ballot. It has been argued that a signature hurdle does not always determine popular support since the signature hurdle can be achieved through hiring a professional company to gather signatures. Instead of a signature hurdle a reliable opinion poll as hurdle has been proposed.

The success of a popular initiative depends on the exact wording.

== By type ==
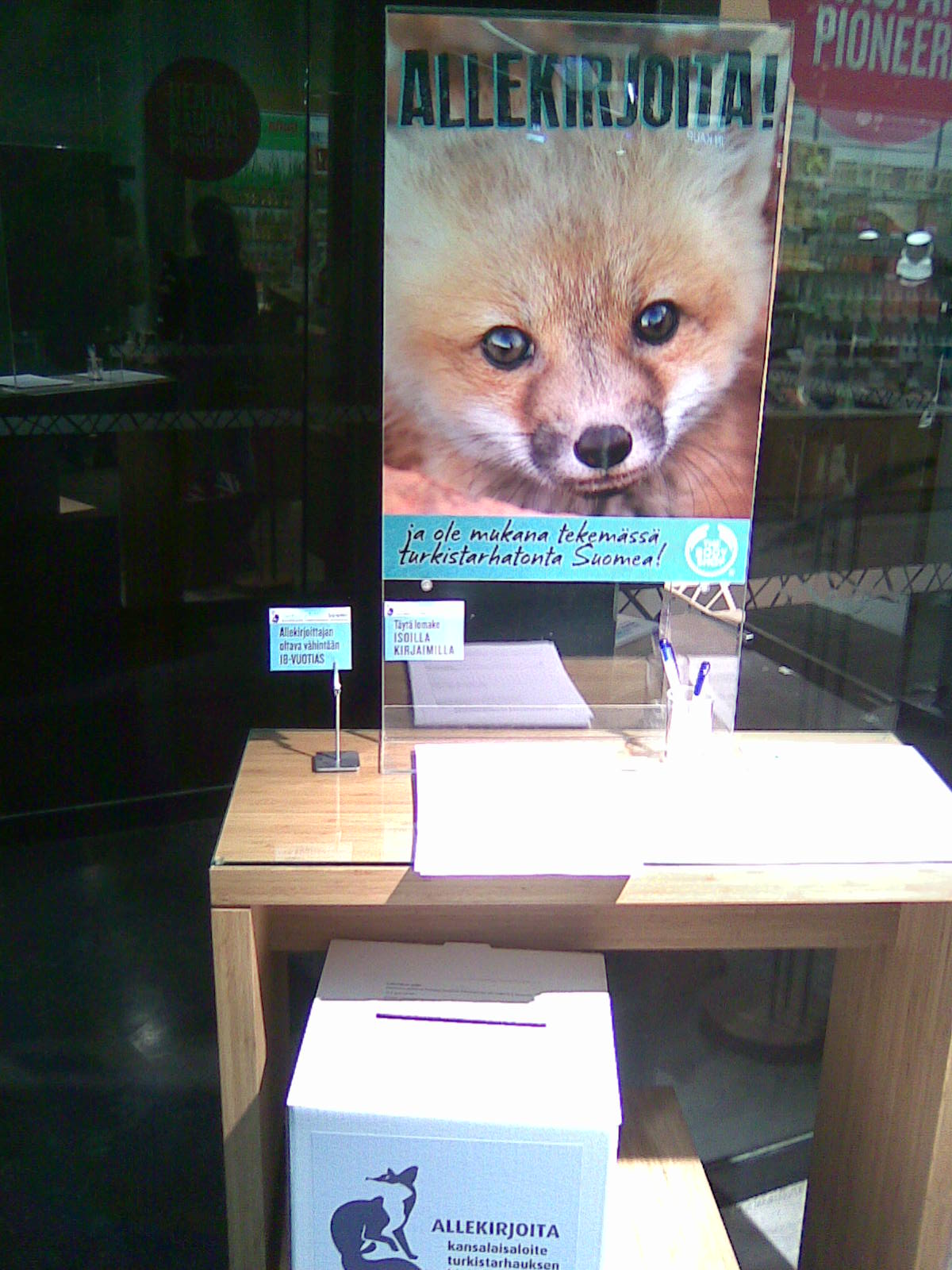
Signature collection point at The Body Shop in Kluuvi shopping centre, Helsinki, for one of the first citizens' initiatives in Finland, about banning fur farming.

=== Direct initiative ===
A direct initiative places an initiative measure directly on the ballot for voters to pass or reject. The measure is not submitted to the legislature for support first.

=== Indirect initiative ===
An indirect initiative is voted on by a legislature after sufficient signatures are collected from the voting population. In most areas the measure is submitted to a subsequent popular vote only if amended by the legislature.

=== Agenda setting initiative ===
An agenda setting initiative is a measure submitted by petition to a legislature for consideration. The legislature may choose to approve or reject the proposal without a public vote. This form or initiative is more common than a legally binding direct or indirect initiative.

== Adoption by incumbent legislators ==
An initiative right moves part of the power to set the political agenda from elected officials to voters, yet in modern democracies it can rarely be introduced without the consent of those same officials, usually through a statute or a constitutional amendment that the legislature passes or refers to the electorate. Because legislators normally design political institutions to their own advantage, Bowler, Donovan and Karp describe the adoption of direct democracy by legislatures as a puzzle requiring explanation. Research on the question has identified several overlapping processes and motives.

=== Electoral competition and insurance against losing office ===
Smith and Fridkin studied why some American state legislatures referred the initiative to voters between 1898 and 1918, when 20 states adopted it, while others did not. They found that political conditions, namely interparty competition in the legislature, the strength of party organizations, and the presence of third parties, were the most powerful predictors of referral. In their account, when the majority party's seat margin narrows, minority and third parties can champion institution-weakening reforms that appeal to the median voter, and vulnerable members of the majority defect to these positions to protect their own re-election. On this view, delegating the initiative was a self-interested move by legislators rather than an unwitting surrender of power. The size of the majority party's seat surplus was the strongest single predictor in their models, while a regional variable for the American West, which had been used to support the conventional explanation of a distinctive western populist culture, was not significant.

Hugh-Jones offers a formal model in which some elected politicians gain from introducing direct democracy in two ways. Politicians who expect to lose office may prefer to constrain the opponents who will replace them. In addition, because direct democracy allows voters to correct individual policies without removing their representative, it reduces voters' incentive to vote incumbents out, so some politicians become more likely to be re-elected while pursuing policies closer to their own preferences. Hugh-Jones argues that the model accounts for the observation that legislators in US states with direct democracy are trusted less but re-elected more. In surveys of legislators and legislative candidates in Canada, New Zealand and the United States, Bowler, Donovan and Karp found that support for direct democracy depended on governing-party affiliation, incumbency and length of tenure, as well as on ideology and attitudes about democracy.

=== Pressure from challengers and opposition parties ===
Initiative rights have often been pressed on governing parties by challengers. Bowler and Donovan found that the most directly democratic forms of the initiative were adopted in the American states where Populist forces had been strongest in the 1890s.

In Switzerland, the federal popular initiative was promoted by the Catholic-Conservative opposition, three of whose National Councillors filed a parliamentary motion for it in 1884, and by the labour association Grütliverein, which petitioned for it in 1888. Much of the dominant Liberal camp opposed the reform, arguing among other things that parliament would lose power because a fully drafted initiative text could not be amended. Michel concludes that the Liberals' arguments were aimed mainly at preserving their own power, while the Catholic-Conservatives and the Grütliverein hoped to expand their influence. Leemann, Emmenegger and Walter describe the Conservatives and the Socialists, who then held no seats in parliament, as backing the initiative because they were disadvantaged by an electoral system they regarded as gerrymandered by the ruling Radical-Liberal coalition. That coalition was internally divided, and dissident members facing competition in their own districts helped the proposal pass the lower chamber. Voters then approved it with about 60.3% of the vote.

=== Responding to disaffection ===
Governing parties have also presented initiative rights as a remedy for declining trust in representative institutions. Scarrow found that Germany's established parties were the main force behind the expansion of direct democracy in the German states during the 1990s. The reformers were responding to growing antipathy towards parties and to falling electoral participation, and competition between the parties was crucial in securing the reforms' passage. Scarrow also found that neither the SPD nor the CDU received much electoral credit for them. Supporters of the Swiss initiative in 1890–1891 similarly argued that it would act as a safety valve and as a catalyst for new political issues. Smith and Fridkin note that an initiative process can also serve as a "pressure valve" that allows legislators to avoid divisive issues by leaving them to voters.

Governments facing electoral defeat have sometimes offered direct democracy as a popular issue. In British Columbia, the Social Credit government, then embroiled in scandal, put recall and initiative to a referendum held alongside the 1991 provincial election. The political scientist Dennis Pilon has argued that the referendum was a political move by a party searching for a populist issue that might save it, rather than a response to public demand. Social Credit lost the election, and the initiative law that was eventually enacted was the work of the succeeding government (see Canada below).

=== Limiting the transfer of power through design ===
Because legislators also write the implementing rules, they can grant an initiative right while limiting its practical effect, for example through high signature or turnout requirements, or by making the outcome non-binding. After Swiss voters adopted the initiative in 1891 over Liberal objections, the Liberals restricted its effect in the implementing legislation by prohibiting voters from approving both an initiative and a parliamentary counter-proposal, which split the reform camp and favoured the status quo. In Taiwan, the Kuomintang and the People First Party, which together dominated the Legislative Yuan and strongly opposed the governing Democratic Progressive Party's referendum bill, passed a watered-down Referendum Act in 2003. It required a 50% turnout for a referendum to be valid and set high thresholds for citizens' petitions, and became known as the "birdcage" Referendum Act. None of the first six national referendum questions held under it met the turnout requirement, and the thresholds were cut in December 2017. The Dutch referendum law of 2015 allowed only citizen-initiated, corrective and non-binding referendums on laws already passed by parliament. Van der Meer, Wagenaar and Jacobs describe its turnout threshold as ill-suited to its purpose, creating a strategic dilemma for voters.

=== Withdrawal ===
An initiative right granted by legislators can also be withdrawn by them once it is used against the government of the day. In the Irish Free State, the Cumann na nGaedheal government deleted the constitutional right of initiative in 1928 after the opposition Fianna Fáil gathered signatures to abolish the Oath of Allegiance (see Ireland below). In the Netherlands, voters rejected the Ukraine–European Union Association Agreement in the first referendum held under the 2015 law, after which support for referendums soured among centrist politicians. Despite a smoother second referendum, the new governing coalition agreed to abolish the law, making the Netherlands the first democratic country to repeal its national referendum legislation. The Senate approved the repeal on 10 July 2018.

== By country ==
=== Americas ===
==== Brazil ====
In Brazil, a popular law initiative requires two conditions be met before it is sent to the National Congress: signatures from at least 1% of national registered voters and at least 0.3% of the people allowed to vote from each of at least five of the 27 federal unities (the 26 states plus the federal district). If both conditions are met, Congress is obliged to discuss and vote on holding the initiative.

==== Canada ====
British Columbia

The Canadian province of British Columbia has a citizen initiative law known as the Recall and Initiative Act. The original proposal was put to voters in a referendum held in October 1991 and was supported by over 83% of voters. It was subsequently put into force by the incoming NDP government. Since it came into force in 1995, at least 14 attempts have been made to force the government to either adopt a law or to hold a referendum on the question, but only one has succeeded. Only one secured the required signatures of 10% of registered voters in each riding throughout British Columbia. Due to this achievement the government held the first referendum under this legislation, in September 2011 on the subject of repealing the Harmonized Sales Tax. Details of its use in BC are available on the Elections BC website.

Alberta

Under Alberta's Citizen Initiative Act, citizens can initiate a referendum on policy through a petition with a set number of signatures.

Such was done for part of the formulation of the question on separation for a referendum in 2026.

==== United States ====
In the United States, a popular vote on a measure is referred to as a referendum only when aiming at allowing or repealing an act passed by a state legislature. An initiative may be called a "ballot measure", "initiative measure", or "proposition".

The United States has no initiative process at the national level, but the initiative is in use at the level of state government in 24 states and the District of Columbia, and is also in common use at the local government level.

Article I, Section I of the United States Constitution vests "all legislative powers herein granted" to the Congress of the United States. Establishing a national initiative procedure would likely require an amendment to the Constitution, which would under Article V require two-thirds of both houses of Congress or the application of two-thirds of the state legislatures to propose, and three-fourths of all state legislatures (or conventions in three-fourths of the states) to ratify. The Constitution itself, pursuant to Article VII, was ratified by state conventions rather than by a referendum.

Several proposals have been made to institute a national referendum. The Ludlow Amendment, introduced several times to the House of Representatives by Louis Ludlow of Indiana between 1935 and 1940, proposed an amendment to the Constitution that would require a national referendum to declare war except in the case of invasion or attack. The amendment came closest to overcoming a discharge petition on January 10, 1938, when it was defeated in the House by a vote of 209 to 188, short of the two-thirds vote required for its passage.

Unsuccessful attempts to get initiatives have nevertheless occurred, but since the proposals were bills, not constitutional amendments, no initiative could probably have lawfully been voted on notwithstanding the bills' passage. The first attempt to get national ballot initiatives occurred in 1907 when House Joint Resolution 44 was introduced by Rep. Elmer Fulton of Oklahoma; the proposal was never put to a vote. In 1977, both the Abourezk-Hatfield National Voter Initiative and the Jagt Resolutions never got out of committee. Senator Mike Gravel was part of that effort.

The modern system of initiatives and referendums in the United States originated in the state of South Dakota, which adopted initiatives and referendums in 1898 by a popular vote of 23,816 to 16,483. Oregon was the second state to adopt and did so in 1902, when the Oregon Legislative Assembly adopted it by an overwhelming majority. The "Oregon System", as it was at first known, subsequently spread to many other states, and became one of the signature reforms of the Progressive Era (1890s–1920s). Almost every state currently in the union utilizes some sort of State Question or Initiative. A contemporary issue that is commonly decided through this method is the legalization of marijuana.

==== Uruguay ====
In Uruguay, through the "popular initiative", the electorate can present a bill to the General Assembly, a constitutional reform bill to be submitted to a referendum, and a bill to the departmental governments.

Under Article 79 of the Constitution of the Republic, with the support of 25% of those registered to vote, a bill can be submitted to the General Assembly. For constitutional amendments, Article 331 establishes that with the signature of 10% of citizens registered in the National Civil Registry, a reform bill can be submitted to the president of the General Assembly and submitted to a vote in the following election in a nationwide referendum.

In addition, at the departmental level, under Article 305, 15% of registered residents in a jurisdiction determined by law have the right of initiative before the departmental governing bodies.

=== Asia ===
==== Philippines ====
People's initiative to propose amendments to the constitution is enshrined in the 1987 Philippine Constitution under Article XVII Section 2, which states:

Amendments to this Constitution may likewise be directly proposed by the people through initiative upon a petition of at least twelve per centum of the total number of registered voters, of which every legislative district must be represented by at least three per centum of the registered voters therein. No amendment under this section shall be authorized within five years following the ratification of this Constitution nor oftener than once every five years thereafter.

This provision is further protected by Republic Act 6735 or The Initiative and Referendum Act. The law defines initiative as:

1. A petition to propose amendments to the constitution.
2. A petition to propose enactment of national legislation.
3. A petition to propose enactment of local resolution or ordinance on regional, provincial, city, municipal, or barangay level.

The law also provides indirect initiative defining the exercise of people's initiative through a proposition sent to congress or local legislative body for action.

=== Europe ===
==== European Union ====
The rejected Treaty establishing a Constitution for Europe (TCE) included a limited indirect initiative right (Article I-46(4)). The proposal of introducing the European Citizens' Initiative (ECI) was that 1,000,000 citizens, from minimal numbers of different member states, could invite the executive body of the European Union (EU), the European Commission, to consider any proposal "on matters where citizens consider that a legal act of the Union is required for the purpose of implementing the Constitution." The precise mechanism had not been agreed upon. Critics underlined the weakness of this right of initiative, which did not ultimately entail any vote or referendum.

A similar scheme under the same name, European Citizens' Initiative (ECI), has been put forward in the now ratified European Lisbon Treaty (which entered into force on 1 December 2009), enabling a limited indirect initiative right. It follows very similar rules to the ones outlined in the European Constitution, requiring the signatures of 1,000 000 European Nationals. These citizens would thereby obtain the same right to request the Commission to submit a legislative proposal as the Council has had since the establishment of the European Communities in 1957. This, however, does require that the signatures come from a "significant number" of Member States. It is suggested that this significant number will need to be around a quarter of member states, with at least 1/500 of the citizens in those member states supporting the initiative. With the variety of languages within the European Union, this creates a significant hurdle for people to navigate. The treaty also makes it clear that right of initiative should not be confused with the right to petition, particularly since a petition is directed to Parliament while a citizens' initiative is directed to the Commission; whereas a petition is a method of remonstrance, usually focussing on perceived infringements of European Law, an initiative is a grassroots proposal for new legislation. In 2013 the subjects of ongoing open initiatives of the European Citizens' Initiative are e.g. about "water and sanitation as a human right" (against Water privatization), "30 km/h - making the streets liveable!" (Traffic calming in towns), "Unconditional Basic Income" (UBI - Exploring a pathway towards emancipatory welfare conditions), or to "End Ecocide in Europe" (to give the Earth Rights).

It remains to be seen if the ECI evolves into a full initiative or remains in its present state of a de facto petition.

==== Finland ====
Since 1 March 2012, Finnish citizens with suffrage have had the constitutional right to send a citizens' initiative (Finnish: kansalaisaloite, Swedish: medborgarinitiativ) to the Parliament of Finland. An initiative must begin with at least five citizens as sponsors, and it must consist either of a direct proposal for a new law or of a motion to initiate the drafting of a new law by the relevant government department, as well as present reasons for doing so. A single initiative may not contain proposals on more than one specific legislative issue.

Proposed initiatives are published on a website maintained by the Finnish Ministry of Justice, where they may be electronically signed; signatures are also collected on paper. If an initiative is able to attract the signatures of a total of 50,000 citizens within six months, it is forwarded to the Finnish Parliament for consideration; otherwise, it will lapse. The Parliament treats citizens' initiatives according to normal parliamentary procedure, that is, they are debated and considered in committees and they may also be amended or altered; the Parliament is not restricted to passing or rejecting them as they are.

The first initiative to pass the 50,000 mark did so already a few months after the "kansalaisaloite" first became possible. The initiative demanded the ending of fur industry in Finland, but failed to pass in Parliament. The first initiative to be accepted by the Parliament was the citizens' initiative known in Finland as "Equal Marriages Law", which is also known by its campaign slogan, #Tahdon2013 (#IDo2013). This initiative was accepted by the Parliament during the 2011-2015 parliamentary session, though political debate, decision-making and drafting of the new law continued on to the next parliamentary session. The new law took effect on 1 March 2017. To date, a total of 24 citizens' initiatives have reached the 50,000 mark, with 20 of them having been either rejected or accepted in Parliament - so far, only two have been accepted: the aforementioned "Equal Marriages Law" and the "Motherhood Law" from 2015/16.

==== France ====
A limited, indirect form of local initiative was added to the French Constitution (article 72-1, référendum d'initiative locale) on 28 March 2003 as part of decentralization reforms. However, the only power these "local referendum initiatives" confer on citizens is the ability to add propositions to their local assembly's meeting agenda. The decision as to whether to submit citizen propositions to a popular vote (referendum) rests with the local assembly. A citizens' initiative referendum was proposed by the yellow vests movement. Citizens are able to submit a law project to the parliament through the "Référendum d'Initiative Partagée"; they can ask for a referendum if they meet the 185 deputies requirement and the signatures of at least 10% of the voting population.

==== Germany ====
All German states have the right to initiative. However, there is no constitutional citizens' initiative in Germany at a federal level.

==== Ireland ====
The Constitution of Ireland, since its 1937 enactment, has never made provision for initiatives. Since 2012, the Oireachtas (parliament) has a joint committee to which the public can submit petitions; the committee must formally consider them but need not accept them. In May–June 2013, when the Constitutional Convention considered Dáil electoral reform, members voted 83:16 in favour of allowing "citizens' initiatives" in general, 80:19 to allow them specifically for legislation, and 78:17 to allow them for constitutional amendments. In April 2015, the Fine Gael–Labour government rejected the recommendations on the basis that there is sufficient public involvement in legislation through the petitions committee and the pre-legislative scrutiny process.

Article 48 of the 1922 Constitution of the Irish Free State gave a right of initiative: if more than 50,000 voters demanded a change in law, the Oireachtas had two years to enact it, failing which 75,000 voters could petition for a referendum. The only attempt to invoke this was organised in 1927 by Fianna Fáil, the largest opposition party, which sought to abolish the Oath of Allegiance. By May 1928 Fianna Fáil claimed 96,000 signatures and attempted to have the petition laid before the Dáil (lower house). The motion was deferred, ostensibly to allow the Dáil procedure committee to define the method of dealing with such petitions. Before the committee could meet, the Cumann na nGaedheal government rushed through an amendment deleting Article 48 of the Constitution.

==== Poland ====
Citizens' legislative initiatives are a constitutional right in Poland, defined in Article 118, paragraph 2, of the 1997 Polish Constitution. The paragraph gives legislative initiative to any group of at least 100,000 citizens with voting rights to the Sejm, the lower house of Polish parliament. The detailed procedure is defined in a law dated 24 June 1999.

Under Article 5 of the 24 June 1999 law, citizens wishing to launch an initiative must create a committee of at least 15 members, which becomes a legal person. The committee must prepare the draft bill and collect at least 100,000 signatures (Article 2). Under Article 12 of the law, if there is "justified doubt regarding the authenticity of the required number of signatures of citizens, then within 14 days of the lodging of the list of signatures, the Marshal of the Sejm must request the National Electoral Commission to verify the signatures. The electoral commission has 21 days to carry out the verification.

One of the best known citizens' initiatives in Poland is the pair of 2015/2016 anti-abortion and pro-abortion initiatives which were accompanied by the Black Protest marches coordinated by women's rights groups.

In October 2022, United Poland submitted a citizens' legislative initiative for tougher blasphemy laws in Poland with close to 400,000 (Higher than the 100,000 needed) signatures to parliament.

==== Romania ====
According to Article 74 of the Romanian Constitution, groups of at least 100,000 Romanian Citizens with suffrage that reside in at least one quarter of all the counties and with a minimum 5,000 signatures per county have the right to send a Citizens' Initiative which must be considered by the legislative body (Initiatives that address fiscal or international matters are not covered by this right). If the initiative concerns changing the Constitution, Article 150 of the Constitution states that the group must include at least 500,000 Romanian Citizens with suffrage who reside in at least half of all the counties, with a minimum of 20,000 per county. Article 151 of the Constitution also states that any amendments brought to it, must be also approved by means of a National Referendum.

==== Switzerland ====
The federal popular initiative was included in the Swiss Federal Constitution in 1891, permitting a certain number of citizens (currently 100,000 signatures within 18 months) to make a request to amend a constitutional article, or even to introduce a new article into the constitution. The right of initiative is also used at the cantonal and communal level in Switzerland (all cantons, all communes where the direct democratic citizens' participation originates); many cantons allow initiatives to enact regular non-constitutional law, but the federal system does not.

If the necessary number of supporters is reached, the initiative will be put to a plebiscite about two or three years later; the delay helps prevent short-term political moods from getting into the constitution. The parliament and government will both issue their official opinions on whether they recommend voting for or against the proposed amendment, and these opinions will be published.

The parliament may also pass an alternative amendment suggestion which will also be included on the ballot; in this case, the voters cast two votes, one for whether or not they want an amendment, and one for which one they want, the original one from the initiative or the one introduced in parliament, in case a majority decides for amending.

A citizen-proposed change to the constitution in Switzerland at the national level needs to achieve both a majority of the national popular vote and a majority of the canton-wide vote to pass. The vast majority of national initiatives introduced since 1891, when the system started, have failed to receive voter support. But the initiatives have proven to be a useful tool to force the government to concentrate on subjects that will otherwise remain hidden from the politic, lowering the distance between the government and the citizens.

==== United Kingdom ====
While there is no mandate for a referendum following directly from such an initiative, the UK government has a system whereby citizens can set up online petitions, which are considered by a committee. Any petition which reaches 10,000 signatures triggers a response from the government and those which reach 100,000 signatures will almost always require the government to consider holding a debate (with some exceptions, such as whether a similar issue has been debated recently, or a debate for that issue is scheduled) on the matter in the House of Commons. Only British Citizens or individuals resident in the UK are allowed to start a petition or be a signatory. Petitions can be initiated via a specialist website, which also contains guidance on when petitions will, and will not, be debated. On occasion, some petitions which are signed by fewer than 100,000 people are still debated. Examples of issues which have been debated in parliament via this system are various issues surrounding Brexit and a petition calling for United States President Donald Trump's state visit to UK to be cancelled.

=== Oceania ===
==== New Zealand ====
In New Zealand a vote initiated by the public is called a citizen initiated referendum. These are non-binding referendums on any issue in which proponents have submitted a petition to Parliament signed by ten percent of all registered electors within 12 months.

== See also ==
- Recall election
- Legislative referral
- Popular referendum
