= Mike Bernier =

Canadian politician (born 1968)

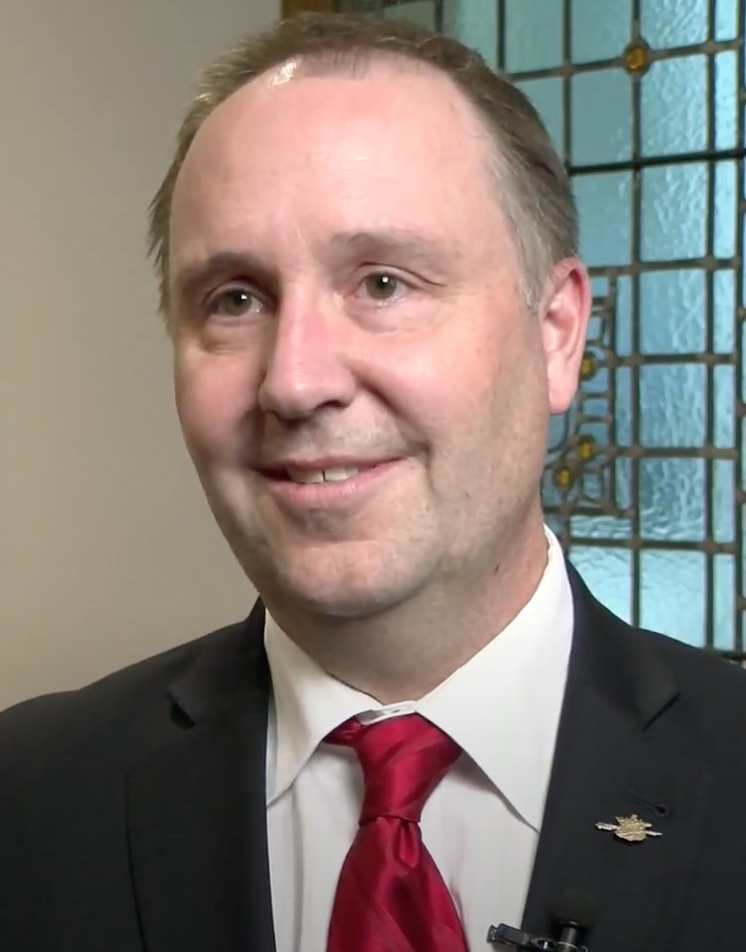
- Bernier in 2016

Leader of CentreBC
- Incumbent
- Assumed office November 14, 2026
- Preceded by: Elenore Sturko
- In office July 18, 2026 – September 18, 2026
- Preceded by: Karin Kirkpatrick
- Succeeded by: Peter Milobar

Member of the British Columbia Legislative Assembly for Peace River South
- In office May 14, 2013 – September 21, 2024
- Preceded by: Blair Lekstrom
- Succeeded by: Larry Neufeld

Minister of Education of British Columbia
- In office July 30, 2015 – July 18, 2017
- Preceded by: Peter Fassbender
- Succeeded by: Rob Fleming

Mayor of Dawson Creek
- In office December 1, 2008 – May 15, 2013
- Preceded by: Calvin Kruk
- Succeeded by: Dale Bumstead

Dawson Creek Municipal Councillor
- In office December 5, 2005 – December 1, 2008

Personal details
- Born: 1968 (age 57–58) North Vancouver, British Columbia
- Party: CentreBC
- Other political affiliations: BC Liberal (until 2024); Independent (2024)

Mike Bernier (born 1968) is a Canadian politician who served as leader of CentreBC from July to September 2026 and again since November 2026. He represented Peace River South in the Legislative Assembly of British Columbia from 2013 to 2024 as a member of the BC Liberal Party, later renamed BC United, and served as British Columbia's minister of education from 2015 to 2017. Before entering provincial politics, he was a Dawson Creek city councillor from 2005 to 2008 and mayor from 2008 to 2013.

== Political career ==
Before being elected provincially, he served as a city councillor (2005–2008) and then the mayor (2008–2013) of Dawson Creek, BC. Before entering politics, he worked for 20 years in the natural gas industry.

He was elected to the Legislative Assembly of British Columbia in the 2013 provincial election. He represented the electoral district of Peace River South as a member of the BC United. In December 2014, he was appointed as Parliamentary Secretary for Energy Literacy and the Environment for the Minister of Environment. On July 30, 2015, he was chosen to be Minister of Education in British Columbia.

In September 2016, Bernier announced that school districts and independent schools would be required to include explicit references to sexual orientation and gender identity in their anti-bullying policies by the end of the year.

On October 17, 2016, Bernier fired the Vancouver School Board for failing to pass a balanced budget.

On May 9, 2017, Bernier was re-elected in his rural riding of Peace River South with 75.63% of the vote, the highest a BC Liberal has ever been elected with in provincial history and the eleventh highest across all parties in BC history when the Conservative Party of British Columbia did not run a candidate in the riding.

Bernier was reappointed Minister of Education on June 12, 2017. Bernier sought the BC Liberal Party leadership after Christy Clark's resignation in August 2017, but dropped out of the race after two weeks.

In opposition, he has served as the opposition critic for housing and for finance.

In the 2024 British Columbia general election, he ran as an independent candidate but was unseated by Conservative Party of British Columbia candidate Larry Neufeld.

=== CentreBC ===
On July 18, 2026, Bernier was named leader of CentreBC, succeeding Karin Kirkpatrick.

On September 18, he stepped aside as leader in favour of Peter Milobar, as eight former Conservative MLAs joined CentreBC. Their arrival made CentreBC the third-largest party in the provincial legislature.

Four days later, on September 22, Milobar and six other CentreBC MLAs returned to the Conservatives following the resignation of Conservative leader Kerry-Lynne Findlay and the calling of a snap provincial election. Elenore Sturko, the only MLA to remain with CentreBC, succeeded Milobar as leader. CentreBC subsequently failed to win any seats in the October 24 election.

Bernier did not stand as a candidate in the 2026 British Columbia general election, instead working as a campaign strategist.

He returned as leader on November 14, 2026.

== Electoral record ==
2024 British Columbia general election: Peace River South
Party	Candidate	Votes	%	±%	Expenditures
Conservative	Larry Neufeld	7,182	69.84	+39.32	$44,112.40
Unaffiliated	Mike Bernier	2,525	24.56	-26.64	$12,313.25
New Democratic	Marshall Bigsby	576	5.60	-10.04	$1,286.83
Total valid votes/expense limit		10,283	99.85	–	$71,700.08
Total rejected ballots		15	0.15	–	
Turnout		10,298	56.56	+14.91	
Registered voters		18,206			
Conservative gain from BC United		Swing		+32.98 (Note: Swing against BC United incumbent Mike Bernier, standing for re-election as an unaffiliated candidate.)	
Source: Elections BC

2020 British Columbia general election: Peace River South
Party	Candidate	Votes	%	±%	Expenditures
Liberal	Mike Bernier	3,862	51.19	−24.78	$11,466.78
Conservative	Kathleen Connolly	2,303	30.53	–	$0.00
New Democratic	Corey Grizz Longley	1,180	15.64	−8.39	$1,321.80
Wexit	Dorothy Sharon Smith	199	2.84	–	$538.35
Total valid votes		7,544	100.00	–	
Total rejected ballots		42	0.56		
Turnout		7,586	41.66		
Registered voters		18,211			
Source: Elections BC

2017 British Columbia general election: Peace River South
Party	Candidate	Votes	%	±%	Expenditures
Liberal	Mike Bernier	6,637	75.97	+29.24	$26,175
New Democratic	Stephanie Goudie	2,099	24.03	+2.79	$8,179
Total valid votes		8,736	100.00		
Total rejected ballots		131	1.48		
Turnout		8,867	49.97		
Registered voters		17,746			
Source: Elections BC

2013 British Columbia general election: Peace River South
Party	Candidate	Votes	%	±%	Expenditures
Liberal	Mike Bernier	4,373	46.73	-16.35	$107,254
Conservative	Kurt Zane Peats	2,546	27.21	-	$26,829
New Democratic	Darwin Wren	1,988	21.24	-5.79	$36,616
Independent	Tyrel Andrew Pohl	451	4.82	-	$2,668
Total valid votes		9,358	100.00		
Total rejected ballots		37	0.39		
Turnout		9,395	49.89		
Liberal hold		Swing		–21.78	
Source: Elections BC

British Columbia provincial government of Christy Clark
Cabinet post (1)
Predecessor	Office	Successor
Peter Fassbender	Minister of Education; July 30, 2015–July 18, 2017	Rob Fleming
