= Wilf Hanni =

Canadian politician and oil industry consultant

- Hanni in 2009

Leader of the Christian Heritage Party of British Columbia (Note: Known as the British Columbia Heritage Party until March 2012)
- In office 2010–2013
- Preceded by: Innaugural holder
- Succeeded by: Rod Taylor (interim)

Leader of the Conservative Party of British Columbia
- In office September 24, 2005 – June 2009 (Note: Served as interim leader from September 24, 2005 to March 18, 2006)
- Preceded by: Barry Edward Chilton
- Succeeded by: John Cummins (2011)

Leader of the Reform Party of British Columbia
- In office October 30, 1997 – June 1998
- Preceded by: Jack Weisgerber
- Succeeded by: Bill Vander Zalm

Personal details
- Born: February 19, 1948 (age 78) British Columbia, Canada
- Party: Christian Heritage
- Other political affiliations: Reform; Conservative
- Occupation: Politician, Oil industry consultant
- Known for: Leadership in various political parties

Wilf Hanni (born February 19, 1948) is a Canadian politician and oil industry consultant in British Columbia. Hanni served as leader of the Reform Party of BC from August 30, 1997 to June 1998, and later as leader of the British Columbia Party, and the BC Conservative Party. He was the leader of the Christian Heritage Party of BC until 2013 when he stepped down due to family health issues.

On September 24, 2005, following a non-confidence vote in leader Barry Chilton, Hanni was appointed interim leader of the BC Conservative Party. On March 18, 2006 in Kamloops, Hanni was chosen as leader of the party. His resignation as leader was announced by the party on June 30, 2009. Hanni is a resident of Cranbrook.

== Reform Party of BC ==
The Reform Party of British Columbia is a conservative populist party that won two seats in the Legislative Assembly of British Columbia and 9.27% of the popular vote in the May 28, 1996 provincial election. The leader, Jack Weisgerber, who had defeated Hanni for the party leadership in 1994, resigned.

At the Reform Party's August 30, 1997 leadership convention in Surrey, Hanni was elected leader over John Motiuk and Adrian Wade. A victory in the September 15, 1997 Surrey-White Rock by-election by the Liberal Party left the Reform Party in disarray as the Liberals appeared poised to emerge as the main right-wing party. By the end of November, both Reform MLAs had left the party. Neufeld joined the Liberals. Former Reform leader Weisgerber left Reform to sit as an independent member of the BC Legislature. Party president David Secord quit, party executives on Vancouver Island had staged a mass resignation, and several former candidates had followed Neufeld's lead and joined the Liberals.

Following nine months with Hanni as Leader, Hanni lost a vote of confidence at the party's annual convention, and was forced to resign. The party drafted former British Columbia Social Credit Party leader and BC premier, Bill Vander Zalm to take over. Vander Zalm was unable to halt the slide, and the Reform party now exists largely in name only.

== British Columbia Conservative Party ==
On September 24, 2005, following a non-confidence vote in leader Barry Chilton, the BC Conservative Party appointed Hanni as interim leader. A leadership convention was held on March 18, 2006 at which Hanni was acclaimed as the permanent leader.

He ran in the October 29, 2008 Vancouver-Fairview by-election, receiving 483 votes (4.11% of total ballots cast in the riding).

Under his leadership, the BC Conservatives nominated 24 candidates in the 2009 election. The party won 2.1% of the vote across the province, and over 10% of the vote in several ridings. He resigned as leader in June 2009 along with eight members of the party's board of directors, saying that he "spent much of the last four years fighting a long and protracted battle with a group of dissidents."

== BC Heritage Party/Christian Heritage Party ==
In September 2010 Hanni launched a new political party called the British Columbia Heritage Party. The new party advocated creating a provincial constitution, replacing the existing first-past-the-post voting system with preferential voting, and replacing taxation system with a single rate income tax or a single rate consumption tax (decided in a referendum).

In March 2012, the Christian Heritage Party of Canada agreed to accept the BC Heritage Party as a provincial wing of the party, and the BC party was renamed the Christian Heritage Party of British Columbia.
