= Wilf Hurd =

Canadian politician

Member of the British Columbia Legislative Assembly for Surrey-White Rock
- In office October 17, 1991 – May 2, 1997
- Preceded by: Riding established
- Succeeded by: Gordie Hogg

Personal details
- Born: July 22, 1950 (age 76)
- Party: Liberal Party of Canada (federal); BC Liberals (provincial)
- Education: University of British Columbia
- Occupation: Politician

Wilf Hurd (born July 22, 1950) is a Canadian politician from British Columbia. He represented the riding of Surrey-White Rock for the Liberal Party as a Member of the Legislative Assembly of British Columbia, and was an unsuccessful candidate in the 1997 federal election.

== Political career ==
Hurd has a degree in political science from the University of British Columbia, and was a communications consultant who worked in public relations for two British Columbia forest companies. He was acclaimed as a Liberal candidate in the 1991 provincial election for the riding of Surrey-White Rock. He was also a White Rock alderman for a time. After the Liberals' breakthrough in the election, Hurd was appointed opposition critic for forestry. As shadow forests minister, Hurd was often opposed to Dan Miller. At times, he was in agreement, such as when both urged the federal government to make tree spiking a criminal offense. He was also a proponent of the idea of White Rock's annexing parts of the neighbouring municipality of Surrey south of 40th Avenue. His proposal for a study was rejected by Surrey Mayor Bob Bose.

On June 23, 1992, he called NDP MLA David Schreck a "lap dog of the government" after Schreck rejected a proposal to refer a matter to the select standing committee on health. When NDP MLA's Ujjal Dosanjh and Barry Jones objected to the term, speaker Joan Sawicki asked Hurd to withdraw his words. When he refused, Sawicki ordered him out for the rest of the day. In the aftermath, Hurd promised to make better word choices in the future.

When, due to then-Liberal leader Gordon Wilson's leadership troubles emerged and a leadership convention was called, Hurd was the first declared candidate. When the convention was held on September 11, 1993, he finished third-last, with 36 votes. During the campaign Hurd was the only Liberal MLA (along with a former Liberal and former Socred) who attended a private meeting with interim Socred leader Jack Weisgerber about forming a "coalition" to bring better opposition to the governing NDP.

On December 1, 1995, opposition leader Gordon Campbell shuffled the Liberals' opposition shadow cabinet. Hurd became critic for Education.

In the 1996 general election, he was acclaimed for re-nomination. He was re-elected in his riding during the election on May 28, 1996. His 18039 votes was one of the highest totals for any candidate. After the election, he became opposition critic for universities.

In 1996, federal Liberal officials approached Hurd about running in the upcoming (1997) federal election. He announced on January 16, 1997 that he was seeking the Liberal nomination in the riding of South Surrey—White Rock—Langley. On March 24, 1997, he was acclaimed as the candidate for that riding and announced that he would remain MLA until required to resign by law. On May 2, he resigned to become a candidate in the 1997 federal election for the Liberals in the riding of South Surrey—White Rock—Langley. Hurd was unsuccessful, finishing behind Val Meredith.

== After politics ==
After the 1997 election Hurd became director of government relations for Simon Fraser University.

In 2012, Hurd gave $2,045 in public funds to the BC Liberals. He wrote personal checks to attend fundraisers and was reimbursed by Simon Fraser University for the expenses. After the Vancouver Sun reported on Hurd's donations, the BC Liberal Party said that it would return the money.
