= Larry Neufeld =

Canadian politician

The Honourable Larry Neufeld MLA

Member of the British Columbia Legislative Assembly for Peace River South
- Incumbent
- Assumed office October 19, 2024
- Preceded by: Mike Bernier

Minister of Energy, Mines and Petroleum Resources
- Incumbent
- Assumed office November 20, 2026
- Preceded by: Adrian Dix

Personal details
- Party: BC Conservatives

Larry Neufeld MLA is a Canadian politician who has served as a member of the Legislative Assembly of British Columbia (MLA) representing the electoral district of Peace River South since 2024. He is a member of the Conservative Party.

== Early life and career ==
Neufeld was raised in northern Saskatchewan as the eldest son of a first-generation farmer. He has earned a Bachelor of Applied Science in Engineering and undertook graduate studies in the same field.

At 29 years old, Neufeld was appointed Vice President of Western Canada's largest environmental remediation contractor. He founded his own company in 2006. He is also a former Reserve Infantry Platoon Commander.

As of 2024, Neufeld resides in Peace River South, along with his wife and three children.

== Political career ==
Neufeld has previously supported the People's Party of Canada (PPC). In 2021, he donated $400 to the party, and in 2022, he donated $400 to PPC leader Maxime Bernier's riding association in Beauce.

In November 2023, Neufeld was nominated as the Conservative Party of BC's candidate for the riding of Peace River South. Neufeld declined to attend the planned election forum in his riding, prompting incumbent BC United candidate Mike Bernier to criticize his absence. However, Neufeld stated that his focus during the campaign period was to "engage with voters directly at the doors".

Neufeld went on to win a seat in the Legislative Assembly of British Columbia with 69.8% of the votes, unseating incumbent Mike Bernier, who ran as an independent after BC United suspended its campaign. Following the election, Neufeld was appointed to the official opposition's shadow cabinet as critic for natural gas and LNG.

== Electoral history ==
2026 British Columbia general election: Peace River South
** Preliminary results — Not yet official **
Party	Candidate	Votes	%	±%
Conservative	Larry Neufeld	6,243	77.40	
New Democratic	Marsha Rose Dufresne	1,233	15.29	
Unaffiliated (Note: Endorsed by OneBC but listed as unaffiliated due to "paperwork technicalities")	Helen Scott	561	6.96	
Total valid votes		8,037	99.64	
Total rejected ballots		29	0.36	+0.21
Turnout		8,066		
Registered voters				
Source: Elections BC
Conservative hold		Swing		–0.96

2024 British Columbia general election: Peace River South
Party	Candidate	Votes	%	±%	Expenditures
Conservative	Larry Neufeld	7,182	69.84	+39.32	$44,112.40
Unaffiliated	Mike Bernier	2,525	24.56	-26.64	$12,313.25
New Democratic	Marshall Bigsby	576	5.60	-10.04	$1,286.83
Total valid votes/expense limit		10,283	99.85	–	$71,700.08
Total rejected ballots		15	0.15	–	
Turnout		10,298	56.56	+14.91	
Registered voters		18,206			
Conservative gain from BC United		Swing		+32.98 (Note: Swing against BC United incumbent Mike Bernier, standing for re-election as an unaffiliated candidate.)	
Source: Elections BC

== See also ==
- 43rd Parliament of British Columbia
