= Margo Lainne Greenwood =

Canadian senator since 2022

The Honourable Margo Greenwood OC

Canadian Senator from British Columbia
- Incumbent
- Assumed office November 10, 2022
- Nominated by: Justin Trudeau
- Appointed by: Mary Simon
- Preceded by: Richard Neufeld

Personal details
- Born: Margo Lainne Greenwood; September 2, 1953 (age 73) Wetaskiwin, Alberta, Canada
- Education: University of Alberta (BA); University of Victoria (Masters); University of British Columbia (PhD)
- Occupation: Professor

Margo Lainne Greenwood (born September 2, 1953) is a Canadian senator and Indigenous scholar with expertise in early childhood care and education of Indigenous children. Greenwood is the Academic Leader of the National Collaborating Centre for Aboriginal Health, and a Professor in the First Nations Studies and Education programs at the University of Northern British Columbia. In 2021, Greenwood was appointed as an Officer of the Order of Canada for "her scholarship as a professor of early childhood education, and for her transformational leadership in Indigenous health policy."

== Background ==
Greenwood was born in Wetaskiwin, Alberta, Canada. She was orphaned at the age of 16. Greenwood completed a Bachelor's of Education (BEd) at the University of Alberta, a master's at the University of Victoria, and a PhD at the University of British Columbia in 2008. Previously, she has received the Queen's Golden Jubilee Award (2002) and a National Aboriginal Achievement Award (2011). She was appointed to the Senate of Canada on November 10, 2022. The following year, she was named a Fellow of the Royal Society of Canada.
