= Richmond East =

Defunct provincial electoral district in British Columbia, Canada

Coordinates: 49.166°N 123.078°W

Richmond East was a provincial electoral district for the Legislative Assembly of British Columbia, Canada. It was replaced by the Richmond-Queensborough electoral district after the British Columbia electoral redistribution, 2015.

== Demographics ==
Population, 2001	55,576
Population Change, 1996–2001	7.9%
Area (km^{2})	82.64
Pop. Density (people per km^{2})	673

== Member of the Legislative Assembly ==
Its only MLA was Hon. Linda Reid, a former teacher. She was first elected in 1991 and represents the British Columbia Liberal Party. Ms. Reid was appointed Minister of State for Early Childhood Development on June 5, 2001.

Richmond East
Assembly	Years	Member	Party
Riding created from Richmond
35th	1991–1996	Linda Reid	Liberal
36th	1996–2001	Linda Reid	Liberal
37th	2001–2005	Linda Reid	Liberal
38th	2005–2009	Linda Reid	Liberal
39th	2009–2013	Linda Reid	Liberal
40th	2013–2017	Linda Reid	Liberal
Riding dissolved into Richmond-Queensborough

== Election results ==
2013 British Columbia general election
Party	Candidate	Votes	%	±%	Expenditures
Liberal	Linda Reid	11,592	54.68	-4.05	$113,202
New Democratic	Gian Sihota	6,047	28.52	-3.93	$18,837
Conservative	Nathaniel Lim	1,827	8.62	-	$4,529
Green	Doug Perry	1,178	5.56	-0.99	$388
Independent	Lloyd Chen	247	1.17	-	$250
Excalibur	Ping Chan	175	0.82	-	$2,417
Independent	Cliff Wei	133	0.63	-	$250
Total valid votes		21,199	100.00		
Total rejected ballots		233	1.09		
Turnout		21,432	47.58		
Source: Elections BC

2009 British Columbia general election
Party	Candidate	Votes	%	Expenditures
Liberal	Linda Reid	10,853	58.73%	$101,928
New Democratic	Shawkat Hasan	5,998	32.45%	$16,464
Green	Stephen Rees	1,211	6.55%	$2,500
Nation Alliance	Wei Ping Chen	419	2.27%	$250
Total Valid Votes		18,481		
Total Rejected Ballots		184	0.99%	
Turnout		18,665	45.16%	

B.C. General Election 2005 Richmond East
Party	Candidate	Votes	%	±	Expenditures
Liberal	Linda Reid	11,652	57.48%		$79,453
NDP	Gian Sihota	6,692	33.01%		$16,623
Green	Michael Anthony Wolfe	1,530	7.55%	–	$867
Independent	Mohamud Ali Farah	207	1.02%		$651
Marijuana	Heidi Farnola	191	0.94%		$100
Total Valid Votes		20,272	100%		
Total Rejected Ballots		182	0.90%		
Turnout		20,454	53.01%		

B.C. General Election 2001: Richmond East
Party	Candidate	Votes	%	±	Expenditures
Liberal	Linda Reid	12,498	69.18%		$49,998
NDP	Willy Nasgowitz	2,550	14.11%		$2,541
Green	Stephen Kronstein	1,802	9.97%	–	$1,389
Unity	Joe Pal	599	3.32%		$1,274
Marijuana	John Shavluk	445	2.46%		$1,875
Independent	Mohamud Ali Farah	173	0.96%		$440
Total Valid Votes		18,067	100.00%		
Total Rejected Ballots		78	0.43%		
Turnout		18,145	70.59%		

B.C. General Election 1996: Richmond East
Party	Candidate	Votes	%	±	Expenditures
Liberal	Linda Reid	10,205	55.60%		$36,939
NDP	Balwant Sanghera	5,763	31.40%		$20,448
Progressive Democrat	Marc G. Schaper	1,093	5.96%	–	$900
Reform	Paula Peterson	792	4.32%		$4,067
Green	Kevan Eric Hudson	235	1.28%	–	$100
Social Credit	Chris O'Toole	139	0.76%	–	$8,250
Conservative	Donald Veld	83	0.45%		$850
Natural Law	Carina Shelly	43	0.23%		$100
Total Valid Votes		18,353	100.00%		
Total Rejected Ballots		140	0.76%		
Turnout		18,493	71.62%		

B.C. General Election 1991: Richmond East
Party	Candidate	Votes	%	±	Expenditures
Liberal	Linda Reid	6,870	40.91%		$21,108
NDP	Ron Fontaine	6,096	36.31%		$24,505
Social Credit	Larry Blaschuk	3,703	22.05%	–	$33,882
Green	Douglas Dunn	123	0.73%	–	
Total Valid Votes		16,792	100.00%		
Total Rejected Ballots		494	2.86%		
Turnout		17,286	75.79%		

Legislative Assembly of British Columbia
Preceded by Penticton	Constituency represented by the speaker 2013–2017	Succeeded by Kelowna-Mission
