= Blair Lekstrom =

Canadian politician

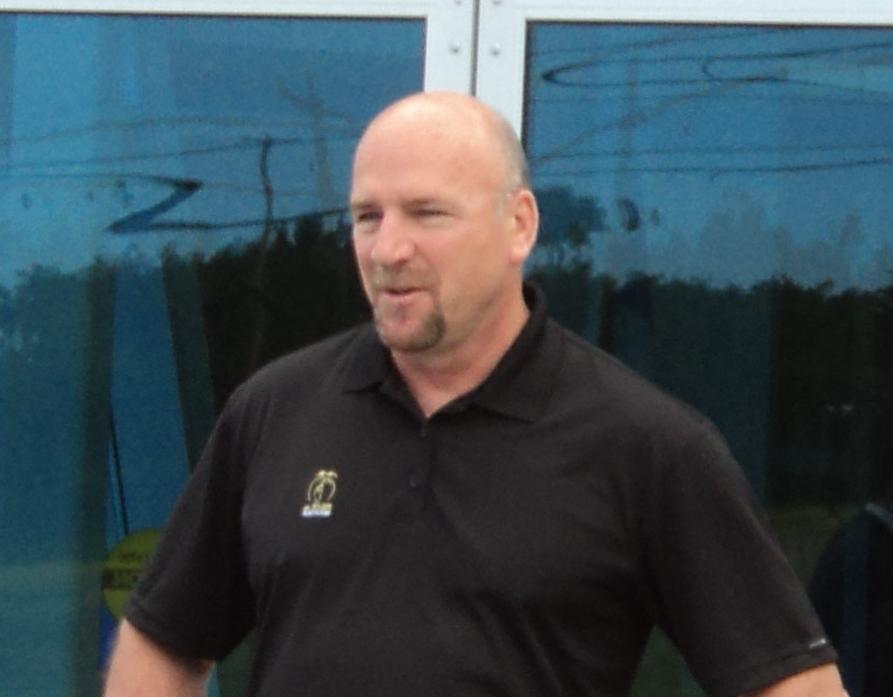

Member of the British Columbia Legislative Assembly for Peace River South
- In office May 16, 2001 – May 14, 2013
- Preceded by: Jack Weisgerber
- Succeeded by: Mike Bernier

Minister of Community Development of British Columbia
- In office June 23, 2008 – January 19, 2009
- Premier: Gordon Campbell
- Preceded by: Ida Chong (Community Services)
- Succeeded by: Kevin Krueger

Minister of Energy, Mines and Petroleum Resources of British Columbia
- In office January 19, 2009 – June 11, 2010
- Premier: Gordon Campbell
- Preceded by: Richard Neufeld
- Succeeded by: Bill Bennett

Minister of Transportation and Infrastructure of British Columbia
- In office March 14, 2011 – September 5, 2012
- Premier: Christy Clark
- Preceded by: Shirley Bond
- Succeeded by: Mary Polak

Mayor of Dawson Creek, British Columbia
- In office 1996–2001
- Preceded by: Bill Kusk
- Succeeded by: Wayne Dahlen

Personal details
- Born: 1961 (age 64–65) North Battleford, Saskatchewan
- Party: Liberal (2001-2010, 2011-present)
- Other political affiliations: Independent (2010-2011)
- Spouse: Vicki Lekstrom (m. 1982)

Blair Lekstrom (born 1961) is a Canadian politician. He was formerly a member of the Legislative Assembly of British Columbia, representing the riding of Peace River South from 2001 to 2013. A caucus member of the British Columbia Liberal Party, he served in several cabinet posts under premiers Gordon Campbell and Christy Clark. He was the mayor of Dawson Creek from 1996 to 2001, and served as city councillor on two separate occasions.

== Biography ==
Lekstrom was born in 1961 in North Battleford, Saskatchewan and moved to Dawson Creek, British Columbia later that year. He graduated from South Peace Secondary School, and worked with BC Tel starting in 1979 as an installer-repairman. He married his wife Vicki in 1982; they have two children together.

He was elected to Dawson Creek City Council in 1993, serving one term as councillor. He then won election as the city's mayor in 1996 and served in that role for two terms. During that time, he was the president of the North Central Municipal Association for the 1999–2000 term.

He ran as a BC Liberal candidate in the 2001 provincial election, and was elected member of the legislative assembly (MLA) for the riding of Peace River South. He was re-elected in 2005, and was appointed to the cabinet by Premier Gordon Campbell in June 2008 to serve as Minister of Community Development, before being re-assigned as Minister of Energy, Mines and Petroleum Resources in January 2009. He kept that portfolio after securing another term as MLA at the 2009 provincial election.

Lekstrom resigned from the BC Liberal caucus on June 11, 2010 over the implementation of the Harmonized Sales Tax, a policy that he had previously endorsed. Following the election of Christy Clark as the party's new leader in 2011, Lekstrom rejoined the Liberals on March 3 that year, and was appointed to Clark's cabinet as Minister of Transportation and Infrastructure on March 14. He announced on September 4, 2012 that he would not run again in the 2013 provincial election, and was dropped from Clark's cabinet the next day.

After finishing his term as MLA, he was hired by HD Mining International, Ltd. in September 2013 as an advisor and spokesperson. He then returned to municipal politics by winning election as Dawson Creek city councillor in 2018, before resigning in February 2020 to become the city's Chief Administrative Officer; he retired from that role in December 2022.
