= Okanagan-Boundary =

Defunct provincial electoral district in British Columbia, Canada

Okanagan-Boundary was a provincial electoral district in British Columbia, Canada, spanning the area from the Similkameen towns of Kaleden and Keremeos to Grand Forks and Christina Lake, and including the southern Okanagan towns of Okanagan Falls, Oliver, Osoyoos, Rock Creek, and Greenwood. The riding first appeared in the 1991 election as the result of a redistribution of the former riding of Boundary-Similkameen. The same area is now part of West Kootenay-Boundary.

== Electoral history ==
Note: Winners in each election are in bold.

35th British Columbia election, 1991
Party	Candidate	Votes	%	±	Expenditures
Social Credit	Charles (Chuck) Stone	**3,978**	25.77%	–	unknown
New Democratic	**Bill Barlee**	**7,228**	**46.82%**		unknown
Liberal	Laurie McDonald	3,859	24.99%		unknown
Green	D. Forbes Leslie	374	2.42 %	–	unknown
Total valid votes		15,439	100.00%		
Total rejected ballots		285			
Turnout		75.76%			

36th British Columbia election, 1996
Party	Candidate	Votes	%	±	Expenditures
**Liberal**	**Bill Barisoff**	**7,011**	**38.85%**		unknown
New Democratic	Bill Barlee	6,984	38.20%		unknown
Social Credit	Doug Biagioni	183	1.00%	–	unknown
Progressive Democrat	Kevin Highfield	775	4.24%	–	unknown
Reform	Garry Mitchell	2,810	15.37%		unknown
Green	David Simm	356	1.95%	–	unknown
Natural Law Party	Gregg Wilson	163	0.89%		unknown
Total valid votes		18,282	100.00%		
Total rejected ballots		83			
Turnout		75.05%			

Following the 1996 election the riding was redistributed. Since the 2001 election the Boundary district area has been represented by West Kootenay-Boundary and the Okanagan towns by Penticton-Okanagan Valley. The Similkameen towns (Keremeos, Kaleden, Hedley) were added to the Yale-Lillooet riding.

== See also ==
- List of British Columbia provincial electoral districts
- Canadian provincial electoral districts
- List of electoral districts in the Okanagan
- List of electoral districts in the Kootenays
