= Prince George-Mount Robson =

Defunct provincial electoral district in British Columbia, Canada

Prince George-Mount Robson was a provincial electoral district for the Legislative Assembly of British Columbia, Canada from 1991 to 2009.

== History ==
The riding was created for the 1991 election from part of Prince George South. It was abolished before the 2009 election into Prince George-Valemount.

== Members of the Legislative Assembly ==
1. Lois Boone, NDP (1991–2001)
2. Shirley Bond, Liberal (2001–2009)

Its last MLA was Shirley Bond who was first elected in 2001. She represented the British Columbia Liberal Party. Mrs. Bond was appointed Minister of Health Services and Deputy Premier in 2004. She had previously served as Minister of Advanced Education.

== Election results ==
2005 British Columbia general election: Prince George-Mount Robson
Party	Candidate	Votes	%	±	Expenditures
Liberal	Shirley Bond	5,885	41.06%		$96,874
NDP	Wayne Mills	4,994	34.85%		$65,715
Independent	Paul Nettleton	2,158	15.06%		$10,207
Green	Don Roberts	1,053	7.35%	–	$2,460
Marijuana	Matthew James Burnett	241	1.68%		$100
Total valid votes		14,331	100%		
Total rejected ballots		290	2.02%		
Turnout		14,621	58.41%		

2001 British Columbia general election: Prince George-Mount Robson
Party	Candidate	Votes	%	±	Expenditures
Liberal	Shirley Bond	8,033	55.72%		$49,527
NDP	Todd Whitcombe	2,655	18.42%		$10,219
Green	Lelani Lynn Arris	1,429	9.91%	–	$2,559
Unity	Bob Zayonc	1,110	7.70%		$3,799
Marijuana	Andrej Joeseph DeWolf	744	5.16%		$1,314
Reform	Erle Martz	445	3.09%		$4,022
Total valid votes		14,416	100.00%		
Total rejected ballots		128	0.89%		
Turnout		14,544	68.80%		

1996 British Columbia general election: Prince George-Mount Robson
Party	Candidate	Votes	%	±	Expenditures
NDP	Lois Boone	4,713	40.67%		$33,423
Liberal	Lorna Dittmar	3,764	32.48%		$36,638
Reform	Norm Lorenz	2,076	17.92%		$9,657
Progressive Democrat	Brian Self	788	6.80%	–	$978
Green	Richard Michael Zammuto	247	2.13%	–	$440
Total valid votes		11,588	100.00%		
Total rejected ballots		88	0.33%		
Turnout		11,676	63.84%		

1991 British Columbia general election: Prince George-Mount Robson
Party	Candidate	Votes	%	±	Expenditures
NDP	Lois Boone	5,751	50.99%		$21,158
Social Credit	Bruce Strachan	4,135	36.66%	–	$24,874
Independent	William W. Kordyban	1,393	12.35%		$8,934
Total valid votes		11,279	100.00%		
Total rejected ballots		364	3.13%		
Turnout		11,643	69.32%		

== See also ==
- List of British Columbia provincial electoral districts
- Canadian provincial electoral districts
