= 1996 British Columbia general election =

Canadian provincial election

- May 28, 1996

75 seats of the Legislative Assembly of British Columbia 38 seats were needed for a majority
- Turnout: 59.11% ▼4.92 pp
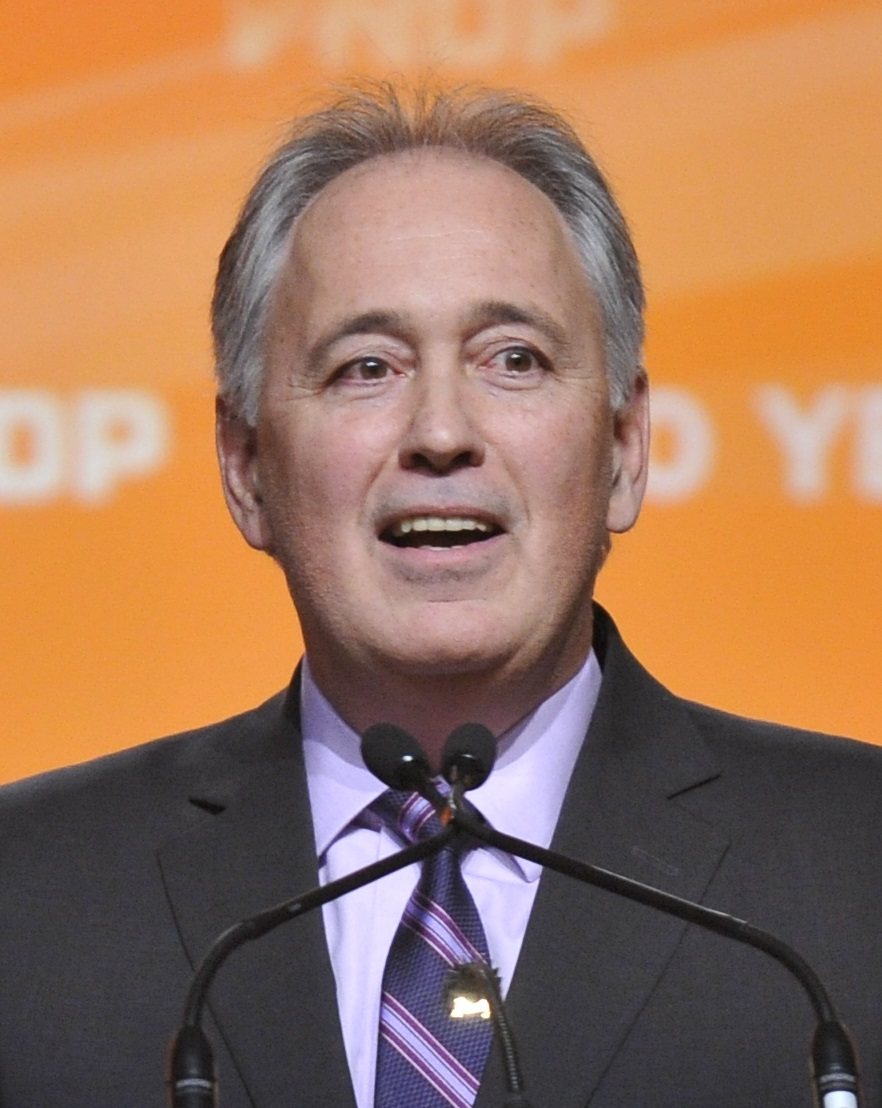

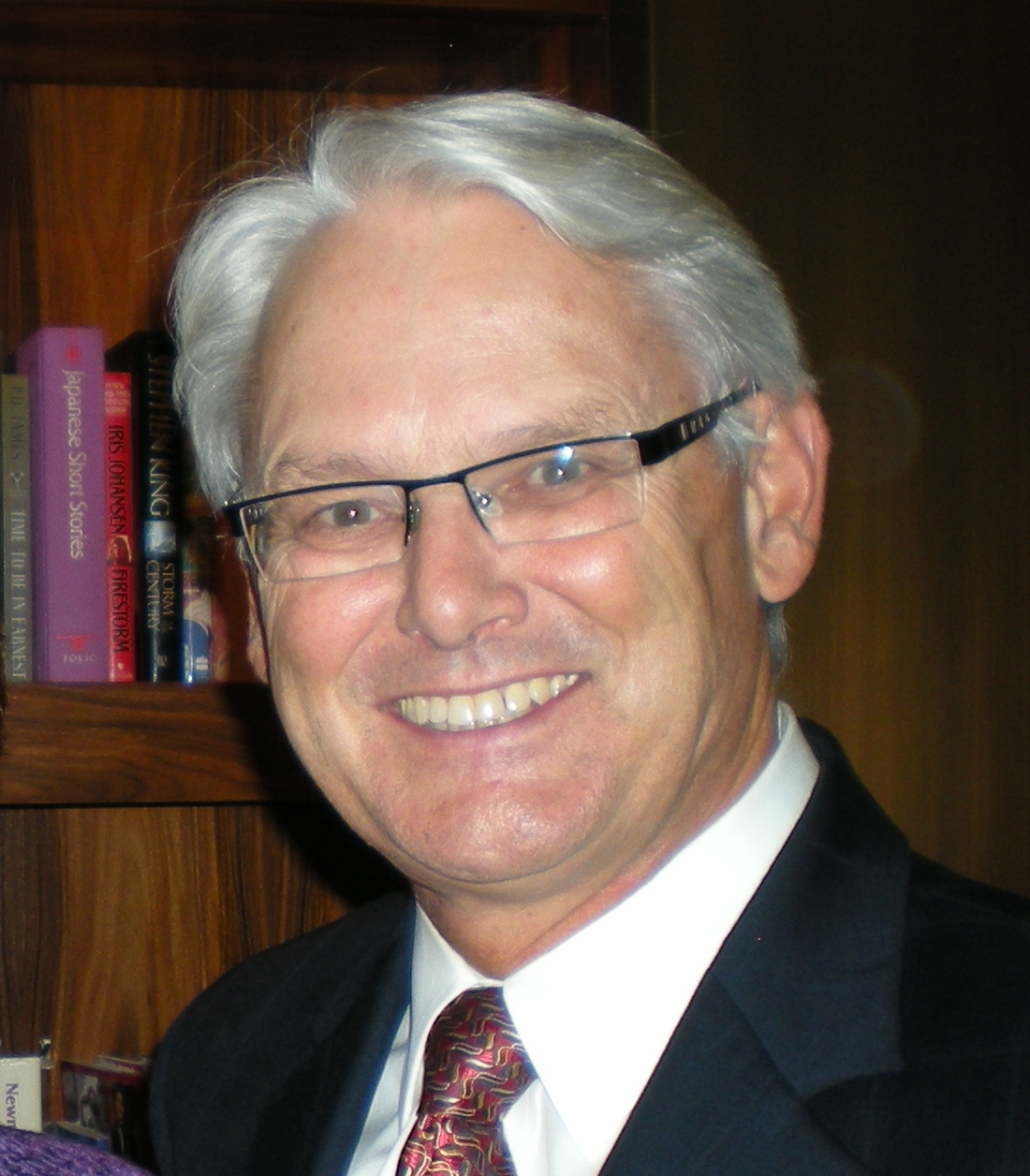
| | First party | Second party |
|---|---|---|
| Leader | Glen Clark | Gordon Campbell |
| Party | New Democratic | Liberal |
| Leader since | February 18, 1996 | September 11, 1993 |
| Leader's seat | Vancouver Kingsway | Vancouver-Point Grey |
| Last election | 51 seats | 17 seats |
| Seats won | 39 | 33 |
| Seat change | ▼12 | ▲16 |
| Popular vote | 624,395 | 661,929 |
| Percentage | 39.45% | 41.82% |
| Swing | ▼1.26 | ▲8.58 |
| | Third party | Fourth party |
| | Ref | PDA |
| Leader | Jack Weisgerber | Gordon Wilson |
| Party | Reform | Progressive Democrat |
| Leader since | January 15, 1995 | December 5, 1993 |
| Leader's seat | Peace River South | Powell River-Sunshine Coast |
| Last election | 0 seats | pre-creation |
| Seats won | 2 | 1 |
| Seat change | ▲2 | ▲1 |
| Popular vote | 146,734 | 90,797 |
| Percentage | 9.27% | 5.74% |
| Swing | ▲9.09 | ▲5.74 |
Premier before election
Glen Clark
New Democratic
Premier after election
Glen Clark
New Democratic

The 1996 British Columbia general election was the 36th provincial election in the Province of British Columbia, Canada. It was held to elect members of the Legislative Assembly of British Columbia. The election was called on April 30, 1996, and held on May 28, 1996. Voter turnout was 59.1 per cent of all eligible voters.

New Democratic Party leader and provincial premier Mike Harcourt had resigned as the result of a fundraising scandal involving one of the members of his caucus. Glen Clark was chosen by the party to replace Harcourt. While polling prior to Harcourt's resignation had shown the NDP to be on-track for a landslide defeat, Clark was able to turn their fortunes around and led the party to a second majority government, defeating the Liberal Party of Gordon Campbell, who had become leader of the Liberal Party after Gordon Wilson had been forced out of the position because of his relationship with another Liberal member of the legislature, Judi Tyabji.

After Wilson was defeated by Campbell in the convention to choose a new leader, he and Tyabji left the Liberal Party to establish the Progressive Democratic Alliance. Wilson was able to win re-election, but Tyabji was not, who went down to defeat with all of the other candidates fielded by the new party.

The once-dominant Social Credit Party collapsed. The party chose Grace McCarthy as its leader in 1993, but she was unable to make a bid to get into the legislature until 1994, when she lost a by-election in the longtime Socred stronghold of Matsqui. Soon afterward, four of its remaining six members defected to Reform BC, leaving Social Credit without official status in the legislature. One more seat was lost in a by-election, reducing the party's representation to one MLA, Cliff Serwa. Serwa retired before the election, however, leaving the party with no incumbents. Party leader Larry Gillanders withdrew from the race while the campaign was in progress, saying that all right-wing parties should unite to topple the ruling NDP. The Socreds won only 0.4% of the vote and were completely shut out of the legislature. While the party still nominally existed until 2023 (with a hiatus from 2013 to 2016), it never elected another MLA.

Reform BC held on to two of its four seats.

Although the Liberals won the largest share of the popular vote, most of their votes were wasted in the outer regions of the province, and it won only 8 seats in the Vancouver area. Additionally, they suffered from vote-splitting with Reform, the Progressive Democrats, and what little remained of the Socreds. These factors allowed the NDP to win 6 more seats than the opposition Liberals, eking out a majority government. This was the last election to return an NDP majority until 2020, 24 years later.

This was also the first provincial election held in BC since the voting age was lowered from 19 to 18 in 1992.

== Opinion polls ==
Evolution of voting intentions at provincial level
| Polling firm | Last day of survey | Source | BCNDP | BCLP | RPBC | PDA | BCSC | Other | ME | Sample |
|---|---|---|---|---|---|---|---|---|---|---|
| Election 1996 | May 28, 1996 | | 39.45 | 41.82 | 9.27 | 5.74 | 0.40 | 3.32 | | |
| McIntyre & Mustel | May 23, 1996 | | 43.3 | 40.9 | 9.9 | —N/a | 0 | —N/a | 4.4 | 630 |
| Angus Reid | May 14, 1996 | | 40 | 41 | 12 | —N/a | —N/a | —N/a | 3.5 | 800 |
| McIntyre & Mustel | May 11, 1996 | | 45 | 35.4 | 14.7 | 1.7 | 0.5 | —N/a | 4.8 | 516 |
| Angus Reid | May 2, 1996 | | 45 | 33 | 17 | —N/a | —N/a | —N/a | —N/a | —N/a |
| McIntyre & Mustel | May 1, 1996 | | 44 | 36 | 16 | 1.6 | 1.4 | —N/a | 4.2 | 544 |
Election called (April 30, 1996)

Evolution of voting intentions at provincial level
| Polling firm | Last day of survey | Source | BCNDP | BCLP | RPBC | PDA | BCSC | Other | ME | Sample |
|---|---|---|---|---|---|---|---|---|---|---|
| Marktrend | April 14, 1996 | | 38 | 32 | 21 | —N/a | —N/a | —N/a | 4.4 | 503 |
| Angus Reid | March 12, 1996 | | 40 | 38 | 16 | 3 | 1 | —N/a | 4.0 | 600 |
| McIntyre & Mustel | March 1996 | | 38 | 38 | 20 | —N/a | 1 | 3 | —N/a | 295 |
| MarkTrend | February 23, 1996 | | 29 | 38 | 27 | —N/a | —N/a | —N/a | 4.4 | 502 |
| Viewpoints | January 17, 1996 | | 34.9 | 40.6 | 20 | —N/a | —N/a | —N/a | 2.5 | 1,600 |
| MarkTrend | January 1996 | | 28 | 37 | 27 | —N/a | —N/a | —N/a | —N/a | —N/a |
Glen Clark becomes leader of the NDP and Premier (February 22, 1996)
| Angus Reid | December 12, 1995 | | 35 | 40 | 22 | —N/a | —N/a | —N/a | 4.1 | 605 |
Mike Harcourt announces resignation as Premier and leader of the NDP (November 15, 1995)|
| Angus Reid | November 8, 1995 | | 24 | 49 | 22 | —N/a | —N/a | —N/a | —N/a | 805 |
| McIntyre & Mustel | March 1995 | | 28 | 47 | 21 | —N/a | 2 | 3 | —N/a | 284 |
Jack Weisgerber becomes leader of the BC Reform Party (January 15, 1995)
| MarkTrend | December 1994 | | 25 | 41 | 28 | —N/a | —N/a | —N/a | 4.4 | 500 |
| McIntyre & Mustel | December 1994 | | 31 | 42 | 20 | —N/a | —N/a | —N/a | —N/a | —N/a |
| Viewpoints | November 1994 | | 30 | 42 | 22 | —N/a | —N/a | —N/a | —N/a | 2,000 |
| McIntyre & Mustel | September 1994 | | 25 | 41 | 26 | —N/a | 5 | 3 | —N/a | 304 |
| Angus Reid | September 1994 | | 30 | 44 | 19 | —N/a | —N/a | 7 | —N/a | —N/a |
| McIntyre & Mustel | June 5, 1994 | | 21 | 39 | 28 | —N/a | 7 | 5 | 4.5 | 505 |
| Viewpoints | June 1994 | | 30 | 39 | 24 | —N/a | —N/a | 3 | —N/a | —N/a |
| Marktrend | June 1994 | | 23 | 38 | 34 | —N/a | —N/a | 3 | —N/a | —N/a |
| Angus Reid | March 1994 | | 25 | 53 | 7 | 0.4 | 10 | —N/a | 4 | 600 |
| | March 1994 | | 25 | 38 | 21 | —N/a | 10 | —N/a | —N/a | —N/a |
| Angus Reid | December 1993 | | 21 | 47 | —N/a | —N/a | 14 | —N/a | —N/a | 603 |
| McIntyre & Mustel | December 1993 | | 20 | 49 | —N/a | —N/a | 18 | —N/a | 4.5 | 502 |
PDA founded (December 5, 1993)
| Angus Reid | September 1993 | | 26 | 48 | —N/a | —N/a | 14 | —N/a | 4 | 600 |
Gordon Campbell becomes leader of the BC Liberals (September 11, 1993)
| McIntyre & Mustel | September 1993 | | 27 | 50 | —N/a | —N/a | 19 | —N/a | 5 | —N/a |
| Angus Reid | June 1993 | | 27 | 42 | —N/a | —N/a | 22 | —N/a | —N/a | —N/a |
| Angus Reid | March 10, 1993 | | 42 | 32 | —N/a | —N/a | 17 | —N/a | 4 | 600 |
| Angus Reid | November 1992 | | 31 | 47 | —N/a | —N/a | —N/a | —N/a | —N/a | —N/a |
| Angus Reid-Southam News | August 31, 1992 | | 33 | 46 | —N/a | —N/a | 16 | —N/a | 8 | 176 |
| Angus Reid-Southam News | July 1992 | | 48 | 32 | —N/a | —N/a | 11 | —N/a | —N/a | —N/a |
| Election 1991 | October 17, 1991 | | 40.71 | 33.25 | 0.18 | - | 24.27 | 1.59 | | |

== Results ==
Elections to the 36th Legislative Assembly of British Columbia (1996)
| Party | Leader | Candidates | Votes | | | | Seats | | |
| Party | Leader | Candidates | # | ± | % | Change (pp) | 1991 | 1996 | ± |
|---|---|---|---|---|---|---|---|---|---|
| New Democratic | Glen Clark | 75 | 624,395 | 29,004▲ | 39.45 | -1.26 | 51 | 39 / 75 | 12▼ |
| Liberal | Gordon Campbell | 75 | 661,929 | 175,721▲ | 41.82 | 8.58 | 17 | 33 / 75 | 16▲ |
| Reform | Jack Weisgerber | 75 | 146,734 | 143,701▲ | 9.27 | 9.09 | – | 2 / 75 | 2▲ |
| Progressive Democrat | Gordon Wilson | 66 | 90,797 | 90,797▲ | 5.74 | 5.74 | – | 1 / 75 | 1▲ |
| Social Credit | Larry Gillanders | 38 | 6,276 | 345,384▼ | 0.40 | -23.65 | 7 | 0 / 75 | 7▼ |
| Green | Stuart Parker | 71 | 31,511 | 18,861▲ | 1.99 | 1.13 | | | |
| Independent | | 23 | 10,067 | 214▼ | 0.64 | −0.07 | | | |
| Family Coalition | | 14 | 4,150 | 2,840▲ | 0.26 | 0.17 | | | |
| Natural Law | | 38 | 2,919 | 2,919▲ | 0.18 | New | | | |
| Libertarian | | 17 | 2,041 | 1,181▲ | 0.13 | 0.07 | | | |
| Conservative | Peter B. Macdonald | 8 | 1,002 | 576▲ | 0.06 | 0.03 | | | |
| Western Canada Concept | Doug Christie | 5 | 374 | 277▼ | 0.02 | −0.02 | | | |
| Common Sense, Community, Family | Ross Ellis | 5 | 291 | 291▲ | 0.02 | New | | | |
| Communist | | 3 | 218 | 126▼ | 0.01 | 0.01 | | | |
| Total | | 513 | 1,582,704 | | 100.00% | | | | |
| Rejected ballots | | | 9,951 | 20,782▼ | | | | | |
| Turnout | | | 1,592,655 | 99,455▲ | 71.50% | 3.57▼ | | | |
| Registered voters | | | 2,227,424 | 238,370▲ | | | | | |

=== Vote and seat summaries ===
Ternary plots – shift of electoral support (1991–1996)
1991

1996
Electoral districts identified by colours of winning parties

== MLAs elected ==
Abbotsford: John van Dongen
Alberni: Gerard A. Janssen
Bulkley Valley-Stikine: Bill Goodacre
Burnaby-Edmonds: Fred G. Randall
Burnaby North: Pietro Calendino
Burnaby-Willingdon: Joan Sawicki
Cariboo North: John Wilson
Cariboo South: David Zirnhelt
Chilliwack: Barry Penner
Columbia River-Revelstoke: Jim Doyle
Comox Valley: Evelyn Gillespie
Coquitlam-Maillardville: John Cashore
Cowichan-Ladysmith: Jan Pullinger
Delta North: Reni Masi
Delta South: Fred Gingell
Esquimalt-Metchosin: Moe Sihota
Fort Langley-Aldergrove: Rich Coleman
Kamloops: Cathy McGregor
Kamloops-North Thompson: Kevin Krueger
Kootenay: Erda Walsh
Langley: Lynn Stephens
Malahat-Juan de Fuca: Rick Kasper
Maple Ridge-Pitt Meadows: Bill Hartley
Matsqui: Mike de Jong
Mission-Kent: Dennis Streifel
Nanaimo: Dale Lovick
Nelson-Creston: Corky Evans
New Westminster: Graeme Bowbrick
North Coast: Dan Miller
North Island: Glenn Robertson
North Vancouver-Lonsdale: Katherine Whittred
North Vancouver-Seymour: Daniel Jarvis
Oak Bay-Gordon Head: Ida Chong
Okanagan-Boundary: Bill Barisoff
Okanagan East: John Weisbeck
Okanagan-Penticton: Rick Thorpe
Okanagan-Vernon: April Sanders
Okanagan West: Sindi Hawkins
Parksville-Qualicum: Paul Reitsma
Peace River North: Richard Neufeld
Peace River South: Jack Weisgerber
Port Coquitlam: Mike Farnworth
Port Moody-Burnaby Mountain: Christy Clark
Powell River-Sunshine Coast: Gordon Wilson
Prince George-Mount Robson: Lois Boone
Prince George North: Paul Ramsey
Prince George-Omineca: Paul Nettleton
Richmond Centre: Doug Symons
Richmond East: Linda Reid
Richmond-Steveston: Geoff Plant
Rossland-Trail: Ed Conroy
Saanich North and the Islands: Murray Coell
Saanich South: Andrew Petter
Shuswap: George Abbott
Skeena: Helmut Giesbrecht
Surrey-Cloverdale: Bonnie McKinnon
Surrey-Green Timbers: Sue Hammell
Surrey-Newton: Penny Priddy
Surrey-Whalley: Joan Smallwood
Surrey-White Rock: Wilf Hurd
Vancouver-Burrard: Tim Stevenson
Vancouver-Fraserview: Ian Waddell
Vancouver-Hastings: Joy MacPhail
Vancouver-Kensington: Ujjal Dosanjh
Vancouver-Kingsway: Glen Clark
Vancouver-Langara: Val Anderson
Vancouver-Little Mountain: Gary Farrell-Collins
Vancouver-Mount Pleasant: Jenny Kwan
Vancouver-Point Grey: Gordon Campbell
Vancouver-Quilchena: Colin Hansen
Victoria-Beacon Hill: Gretchen Brewin
Victoria-Hillside: Steve Orcherton
West Vancouver-Capilano: Jeremy Dalton
West Vancouver-Garibaldi: Ted Nebbeling
Yale-Lillooet: Harry Lali

=== Synopsis of results ===
Results by riding – 1996 British Columbia general election
| Riding | Winning party | | | | | | Turnout (Note: including spoilt ballots) | Votes (Note: parties receiving more than 1% of the popular vote, or fielding candidates in at least half of the constituencies, are listed separately. Family Coalition is also shown separately, as it received more votes than Natural Law while fielding fewer candidates.) | | | | | | | | | | |
| Name | 1991 | Party | Votes | Share | Margin # | Margin % | Turnout | NDP | Lib | Ref | PD | Grn | SC | FCP | NLP | Ind | Oth | Total |
|---|---|---|---|---|---|---|---|---|---|---|---|---|---|---|---|---|---|---|
| Abbotsford | SC | Lib | 10,998 | 50.24% | 5,593 | 25.55% | 69.25% | 5,405 | 10,998 | 4,086 | 1,126 | 274 | – | – | – | – | – | 21,889 |
| Alberni | NDP | NDP | 7,398 | 52.01% | 2,299 | 16.16% | 73.32% | 7,398 | 5,099 | 823 | 578 | 195 | – | – | 58 | – | 72 | 14,223 |
| Bulkley Valley-Stikine | NDP | NDP | 4,779 | 37.02% | 1,053 | 8.16% | 71.05% | 4,779 | 3,726 | 3,473 | 624 | 151 | 155 | – | – | – | – | 12,908 |
| Burnaby-Edmonds | NDP | NDP | 9,912 | 46.45% | 1,142 | 5.35% | 70.63% | 9,912 | 8,770 | 1,008 | 1,067 | 387 | 120 | – | 77 | – | – | 21,341 |
| Burnaby North | NDP | NDP | 8,926 | 45.47% | 766 | 3.90% | 72.70% | 8,926 | 8,160 | 1,081 | 976 | 395 | – | – | 62 | – | 31 | 19,631 |
| Burnaby-Willingdon | NDP | NDP | 10,501 | 45.54% | 823 | 3.57% | 71.73% | 10,501 | 9,678 | 999 | 1,161 | 458 | – | – | 74 | – | 190 | 23,061 |
| Cariboo North | NDP | Lib | 5,533 | 40.87% | 353 | 2.61% | 70.05% | 5,180 | 5,533 | 2,561 | – | 168 | – | – | – | – | 97 | 13,539 |
| Cariboo South | NDP | NDP | 6,372 | 41.45% | 322 | 2.09% | 70.88% | 6,372 | 6,050 | 2,684 | – | 267 | – | – | – | – | – | 15,373 |
| Chilliwack | Lib | Lib | 9,273 | 37.90% | 3,284 | 13.42% | 68.57% | 5,989 | 9,273 | 3,237 | – | 232 | – | – | – | 5,736 | – | 24,467 |
| Columbia River-Revelstoke | NDP | NDP | 6,264 | 42.52% | 1,092 | 7.41% | 71.04% | 6,264 | 5,172 | 2,687 | 282 | 270 | – | – | 58 | – | – | 14,733 |
| Comox Valley | NDP | NDP | 13,230 | 42.76% | 2,509 | 8.11% | 72.86% | 13,230 | 10,721 | 3,451 | 1,039 | 1,296 | – | 398 | – | 804 | – | 30,939 |
| Coquitlam-Maillardville | NDP | NDP | 10,812 | 45.91% | 1,372 | 5.83% | 72.33% | 10,812 | 9,440 | 1,434 | 1,289 | – | 133 | – | 123 | – | 320 | 23,551 |
| Cowichan-Ladysmith | NDP | NDP | 12,249 | 49.85% | 4,466 | 18.18% | 73.97% | 12,249 | 7,783 | 2,434 | 1,459 | 645 | – | – | – | – | – | 24,570 |
| Delta North | NDP | Lib | 9,305 | 45.50% | 648 | 3.17% | 74.88% | 8,657 | 9,305 | 755 | 1,385 | 347 | – | – | – | – | – | 20,449 |
| Delta South | Lib | Lib | 13,415 | 58.78% | 7,431 | 32.56% | 74.55% | 5,984 | 13,415 | 1,371 | 1,215 | 333 | 200 | 304 | – | – | – | 22,822 |
| Esquimalt-Metchosin | NDP | NDP | 13,833 | 59.54% | 7,063 | 30.40% | 68.16% | 13,833 | 6,770 | 1,179 | 921 | 376 | – | – | 60 | 58 | 35 | 23,232 |
| Fort Langley-Aldergrove | Lib | Lib | 12,005 | 47.30% | 4,636 | 18.26% | 76.09% | 7,369 | 12,005 | 3,484 | 1,737 | 472 | – | 316 | – | – | – | 25,383 |
| Kamloops | NDP | NDP | 10,135 | 44.30% | 862 | 3.77% | 69.56% | 10,135 | 9,273 | 1,721 | 1,241 | – | 508 | – | – | – | – | 22,878 |
| Kamloops-North Thompson | NDP | Lib | 7,313 | 43.43% | 368 | 2.19% | 72.65% | 6,945 | 7,313 | 1,710 | – | 401 | 468 | – | – | – | – | 16,837 |
| Kootenay | NDP | NDP | 6,398 | 38.59% | 511 | 3.08% | 68.15% | 6,398 | 5,887 | 3,718 | – | 363 | – | – | – | 215 | – | 16,581 |
| Langley | Lib | Lib | 9,277 | 46.62% | 3,482 | 17.50% | 73.19% | 5,795 | 9,277 | 3,224 | 1,195 | 262 | 148 | – | – | – | – | 19,901 |
| Malahat-Juan de Fuca | NDP | NDP | 10,686 | 48.63% | 3,130 | 14.24% | 72.91% | 10,686 | 7,556 | 1,887 | 1,061 | 601 | – | – | – | 98 | 84 | 21,973 |
| Maple Ridge-Pitt Meadows | NDP | NDP | 12,946 | 46.07% | 1,986 | 7.07% | 73.30% | 12,946 | 10,960 | 1,470 | 2,011 | 464 | – | – | 90 | – | 158 | 28,099 |
| Matsqui | SC | Lib | 10,903 | 50.81% | 5,554 | 25.88% | 68.41% | 5,349 | 10,903 | 4,405 | – | 216 | – | 385 | 199 | – | – | 21,457 |
| Mission-Kent | NDP | NDP | 8,232 | 44.16% | 1,120 | 6.01% | 70.92% | 8,232 | 7,112 | 1,618 | 1,243 | 324 | – | – | – | 113 | – | 18,642 |
| Nanaimo | NDP | NDP | 11,210 | 48.75% | 3,538 | 15.39% | 69.79% | 11,210 | 7,672 | 1,867 | 1,337 | 486 | – | 311 | – | – | 113 | 22,996 |
| Nelson-Creston | NDP | NDP | 9,179 | 44.90% | 2,745 | 13.43% | 75.20% | 9,179 | 6,434 | 2,114 | – | 2,282 | – | 360 | 73 | – | – | 20,442 |
| New Westminster | NDP | NDP | 10,418 | 46.69% | 1,827 | 8.19% | 70.41% | 10,418 | 8,591 | 1,446 | 1,121 | 488 | – | – | 107 | 142 | – | 22,313 |
| North Coast | NDP | NDP | 7,298 | 64.82% | 4,399 | 39.07% | 63.33% | 7,298 | 2,899 | 830 | – | 232 | – | – | – | – | – | 11,259 |
| North Island | NDP | NDP | 8,385 | 45.80% | 1,604 | 8.76% | 69.55% | 8,385 | 6,781 | 1,776 | 887 | 479 | – | – | – | – | – | 18,308 |
| North Vancouver-Lonsdale | NDP | Lib | 9,325 | 46.37% | 2,174 | 10.81% | 71.16% | 7,151 | 9,325 | 1,241 | 1,736 | 417 | – | – | 93 | – | 149 | 20,112 |
| North Vancouver-Seymour | Lib | Lib | 14,165 | 56.35% | 7,489 | 29.79% | 76.91% | 6,676 | 14,165 | 1,737 | 1,713 | 645 | 105 | – | 44 | – | 54 | 25,139 |
| Oak Bay-Gordon Head | NDP | Lib | 12,340 | 46.59% | 640 | 2.42% | 79.49% | 11,700 | 12,340 | 675 | 937 | 566 | 48 | 56 | 47 | 118 | – | 26,487 |
| Okanagan-Boundary | NDP | Lib | 7,011 | 38.35% | 27 | 0.15% | 75.05% | 6,984 | 7,011 | 2,810 | 775 | 356 | 183 | – | 163 | – | – | 18,282 |
| Okanagan East | Lib | Lib | 9,382 | 38.37% | 2,950 | 12.06% | 70.24% | 5,176 | 9,382 | 3,116 | 6,432 | 347 | – | – | – | – | – | 24,453 |
| Okanagan-Penticton | NDP | Lib | 10,661 | 43.07% | 1,569 | 6.34% | 73.41% | 9,092 | 10,661 | 2,976 | 1,444 | 464 | – | – | 113 | – | – | 24,750 |
| Okanagan-Vernon | SC | Lib | 9,776 | 39.06% | 2,279 | 9.11% | 71.03% | 7,497 | 9,776 | 5,356 | 1,839 | 334 | 227 | – | – | – | – | 25,029 |
| Okanagan West | SC | Lib | 15,575 | 46.00% | 7,294 | 21.54% | 71.02% | 8,281 | 15,575 | 4,858 | 4,225 | 519 | 399 | – | – | – | – | 33,857 |
| Parksville-Qualicum | NDP | Lib | 13,459 | 41.19% | 483 | 1.48% | 77.12% | 12,976 | 13,459 | 3,955 | 1,669 | 422 | – | – | 110 | – | 81 | 32,672 |
| Peace River North | SC | Ref | 5,299 | 48.41% | 2,162 | 19.75% | 60.49% | 1,975 | 3,137 | 5,299 | 169 | – | 240 | – | – | 125 | – | 10,945 |
| Peace River South | SC | Ref | 3,901 | 31.89% | 123 | 1.01% | 62.60% | 3,778 | 3,774 | 3,901 | 183 | 145 | 452 | – | – | – | – | 12,233 |
| Port Coquitlam | NDP | NDP | 14,767 | 46.37% | 1,457 | 4.58% | 73.48% | 14,767 | 13,310 | 1,335 | 1,789 | 417 | 124 | – | – | – | 102 | 31,844 |
| Port Moody-Burnaby Mountain | NDP | Lib | 10,272 | 44.73% | 468 | 2.04% | 73.40% | 9,804 | 10,272 | 1,039 | 1,408 | 441 | – | – | – | – | – | 22,964 |
| Powell River-Sunshine Coast | Lib | PD | 10,833 | 49.05% | 4,745 | 21.49% | 75.37% | 6,088 | 3,911 | 677 | 10,833 | 518 | – | – | – | – | 57 | 22,084 |
| Prince George-Mount Robson | NDP | NDP | 4,713 | 40.67% | 949 | 8.19% | 63.84% | 4,713 | 3,764 | 2,076 | 788 | 247 | – | – | – | – | – | 11,588 |
| Prince George North | NDP | NDP | 5,837 | 39.58% | 914 | 6.20% | 66.75% | 5,837 | 4,923 | 2,430 | 891 | 173 | – | – | – | 495 | – | 14,749 |
| Prince George-Omineca | SC | Lib | 5,514 | 36.88% | 308 | 2.06% | 67.79% | 5,206 | 5,514 | 2,998 | 1,023 | 209 | – | – | – | – | – | 14,950 |
| Richmond Centre | Lib | Lib | 9,925 | 55.52% | 4,202 | 23.51% | 68.67% | 5,723 | 9,925 | 614 | 996 | 235 | 154 | – | 38 | 65 | 126 | 17,876 |
| Richmond East | Lib | Lib | 10,205 | 55.60% | 4,442 | 24.20% | 71.62% | 5,763 | 10,205 | 792 | 1,093 | 235 | 139 | – | 43 | – | 83 | 18,353 |
| Richmond-Steveston | Lib | Lib | 9,643 | 56.65% | 4,602 | 27.04% | 74.36% | 5,041 | 9,643 | 556 | 919 | 188 | 88 | – | 38 | 450 | 99 | 17,022 |
| Rossland-Trail | NDP | NDP | 8,635 | 50.74% | 2,712 | 15.94% | 74.99% | 8,635 | 5,923 | 1,366 | 660 | 434 | – | – | – | – | – | 17,018 |
| Saanich North and the Islands | Lib | Lib | 13,374 | 47.57% | 2,828 | 10.06% | 77.89% | 10,546 | 13,374 | 1,627 | 1,533 | 898 | – | – | 72 | – | 63 | 28,113 |
| Saanich South | NDP | NDP | 11,394 | 46.11% | 527 | 2.13% | 77.16% | 11,394 | 10,867 | 676 | 1,198 | 343 | – | – | 86 | – | 144 | 24,708 |
| Shuswap | NDP | Lib | 8,596 | 34.55% | 727 | 2.92% | 72.79% | 7,869 | 8,596 | 5,617 | 1,325 | 237 | 221 | – | – | 1,014 | – | 24,879 |
| Skeena | NDP | NDP | 5,353 | 40.34% | 635 | 4.79% | 70.72% | 5,353 | 4,718 | 2,744 | – | 205 | 249 | – | – | – | – | 13,269 |
| Surrey-Cloverdale | Lib | Lib | 14,297 | 48.27% | 5,466 | 18.46% | 74.75% | 8,831 | 14,297 | 2,690 | 2,417 | 366 | 306 | 709 | – | – | – | 29,616 |
| Surrey-Green Timbers | NDP | NDP | 10,278 | 50.11% | 3,348 | 16.32% | 69.40% | 10,278 | 6,930 | 1,183 | 1,150 | 228 | 114 | 255 | 32 | 101 | 241 | 20,512 |
| Surrey-Newton | NDP | NDP | 13,969 | 49.54% | 4,181 | 14.83% | 71.33% | 13,969 | 9,788 | 1,244 | 1,841 | 340 | 174 | 577 | 48 | – | 217 | 28,198 |
| Surrey-Whalley | NDP | NDP | 7,396 | 50.14% | 2,820 | 19.12% | 65.38% | 7,396 | 4,576 | 1,302 | 968 | 243 | 115 | – | 70 | – | 82 | 14,752 |
| Surrey-White Rock | Lib | Lib | 18,039 | 58.04% | 9,824 | 31.61% | 75.89% | 8,215 | 18,039 | 2,519 | 1,110 | 677 | 226 | – | – | 295 | – | 31,081 |
| Vancouver-Burrard | NDP | NDP | 10,646 | 49.70% | 2,671 | 12.47% | 62.68% | 10,646 | 7,975 | 671 | 1,014 | 563 | – | – | 93 | – | 458 | 21,420 |
| Vancouver-Fraserview | NDP | NDP | 8,774 | 45.97% | 380 | 1.99% | 71.94% | 8,774 | 8,394 (Note: Gulzar Singh Cheema was previously a member of the Legislative Assembly of Manitoba) | 643 | 815 | 225 | 177 | – | 57 | – | – | 19,085 |
| Vancouver-Hastings | NDP | NDP | 9,894 | 54.01% | 3,549 | 19.37% | 67.96% | 9,894 | 6,345 | 568 | 824 | 486 | 137 | – | 64 | – | – | 18,318 |
| Vancouver-Kensington | NDP | NDP | 9,496 | 50.74% | 1,888 | 10.09% | 70.25% | 9,496 | 7,608 | 472 | 537 | 349 | 135 | 119 | – | – | – | 18,716 |
| Vancouver-Kingsway | NDP | NDP | 10,525 | 55.46% | 3,528 | 18.59% | 71.07% | 10,525 | 6,997 | 367 | 518 | 264 | 75 | – | 65 | 69 | 98 | 18,978 |
| Vancouver-Langara | Lib | Lib | 11,038 | 60.20% | 5,523 | 30.12% | 68.66% | 5,515 | 11,038 | 519 | 839 | 337 | – | – | 89 | – | – | 18,337 |
| Vancouver-Little Mountain | NDP | Lib | 12,036 | 50.25% | 2,646 | 11.05% | 68.32% | 9,390 | 12,036 | 489 | 1,062 | 714 | 85 | – | 82 | 96 | – | 23,954 |
| Vancouver-Mount Pleasant | NDP | NDP | 11,155 | 64.05% | 6,912 | 39.69% | 60.50% | 11,155 | 4,243 | 354 | 584 | 759 | 86 | – | 114 | – | 121 | 17,416 |
| Vancouver-Point Grey | NDP | Lib | 12,637 | 48.86% | 1,563 | 6.04% | 71.03% | 11,074 | 12,637 | 406 | 857 | 683 | – | 62 | 76 | – | 70 | 25,865 |
| Vancouver-Quilchena | Lib | Lib | 15,509 | 68.68% | 10,532 | 46.64% | 75.71% | 4,977 | 15,509 | 495 | 827 | 627 | 91 | – | 57 | – | – | 22,583 |
| Victoria-Beacon Hill | NDP | NDP | 11,960 | 52.51% | 4,324 | 18.98% | 68.17% | 11,960 | 7,636 | 654 | 1,093 | 1,008 | 96 | – | 64 | 73 | 194 | 22,778 |
| Victoria-Hillside | NDP | NDP | 11,585 | 53.32% | 4,723 | 21.74% | 67.53% | 11,585 | 6,862 | 979 | 1,227 | 790 | – | – | 97 | – | 188 | 21,728 |
| West Vancouver-Capilano | Lib | Lib | 16,675 | 71.29% | 13,189 | 56.38% | 76.63% | 3,486 | 16,675 | 1,326 | 1,182 | 461 | – | 174 | 47 | – | 40 | 23,391 |
| West Vancouver-Garibaldi | Lib | Lib | 12,326 | 57.17% | 6,038 | 28.00% | 73.03% | 6,288 | 12,326 | 1,430 | 693 | 532 | 98 | – | 36 | – | 159 | 21,562 |
| Yale-Lillooet | NDP | NDP | 7,080 | 41.06% | 1,168 | 6.77% | 72.21% | 7,080 | 5,912 | 3,419 | 706 | – | – | 124 | – | – | – | 17,241 |

= Open seat
= turnout is above provincial average
= winning candidate was in previous Legislature
= Incumbent had switched allegiance
= Previously incumbent in another riding
= Not incumbent; was previously elected to the Legislature
= Incumbency arose from by-election gain
= other incumbents renominated
= previously an MP in the House of Commons of Canada
= Multiple candidates

=== Summary analysis ===
Party candidates in 2nd place
| Party in 1st place | Party in 2nd place | | | Total |
| Party in 1st place | NDP | Lib | PD | Total |
|---|---|---|---|---|
| New Democratic | | 39 | | 39 |
| Liberal | 32 | | 1 | 33 |
| Reform | 1 | 1 | | 2 |
| Progressive Democrat | 1 | | | 1 |
| Total | 34 | 40 | 1 | 75 |

Candidates ranked 1st to 5th place, by party
| Parties | 1st | 2nd | 3rd | 4th | 5th |
|---|---|---|---|---|---|
| █ New Democratic | 39 | 34 | 2 | | |
| █ Liberal | 33 | 40 | 2 | | |
| █ Reform | 2 | | 44 | 24 | 5 |
| █ Progressive Democrat | 1 | 1 | 24 | 37 | 3 |
| █ Green | | | 2 | 9 | 52 |
| █ Independent | | | 1 | | 4 |
| █ Social Credit | | | | 4 | 2 |
| █ Family Coalition | | | | 1 | 5 |
| █ Libertarian | | | | | 2 |

=== Seats changing hands ===
Of the 75 seats, 23 were open, of which 21 had members who chose not to stand for reelection, and two arose from MLAs campaigning in another riding. Voters in only 20 seats changed allegiance from the previous election in 1991:

NDP to Liberal (12)

- Cariboo North
- Delta North
- Kamloops-North Thompson
- North Vancouver-Lonsdale
- Oak Bay-Gordon Head
- Okanagan-Boundary
- Okanagan-Penticton
- Parksville-Qualicum
- Port Moody-Burnaby Mountain
- Shuswap
- Vancouver-Little Mountain
- Vancouver-Point Grey

Social Credit to Liberal (5)

- Abbotsford
- Matsqui
- Okanagan-Vernon
- Okanagan West
- Prince George-Omineca

Social Credit to Reform (2)

- Peace River North
- Peace River South

Liberal to Progressive Democrat (1)

- Powell River-Sunshine Coast

Resulting composition of the 36th Legislative Assembly of British Columbia
| Source | | Party | | | | |
|---|---|---|---|---|---|---|
| Source | | NDP | Lib | Ref | PD | Total |
| Seats retained | Incumbents returned | 28 | 8 | | | 36 |
| Seats retained | Open seats held | 11 | 5 | | | 16 |
| Seats retained | Ouster of incumbents changing affiliation | | 3 | | | 3 |
| Seats changing hands | Incumbents defeated | | 8 | | | 8 |
| Seats changing hands | Open seats gained – new MLAs | | 5 | | | 5 |
| Seats changing hands | Open seats gained – taken by MLAs previously incumbent in another riding | | 2 | | | 2 |
| Seats changing hands | Byelection gains held | | 2 | | | 2 |
| Seats changing hands | Incumbents changing allegiance | | | 2 | 1 | 3 |
| Total | | 39 | 33 | 2 | 1 | 75 |
