= Jack Weisgerber =

Canadian politician and businessman (1940–2022)

Member of the British Columbia Legislative Assembly for Peace River South
- In office October 22, 1986 – May 16, 2001
- Preceded by: Donald M. Phillips
- Succeeded by: Blair Lekstrom

Minister of State for Nechako and Northeast
- In office July 6, 1988 – November 1, 1989
- Premier: Bill Vander Zalm

Minister of Native Affairs
- In office July 6, 1988 – April 2, 1991
- Premier: Bill Vander Zalm
- Succeeded by: John Lawrence Savage

Minister of Energy, Mines and Petroleum Resources
- In office April 15, 1991 – November 5, 1991
- Premier: Rita Johnston
- Preceded by: Jack Davis
- Succeeded by: Anne Edwards

Personal details
- Born: John Sylvester Weisgerber; June 12, 1940 Barrhead, Alberta, Canada
- Died: June 3, 2022 (aged 81) North Vancouver, British Columbia, Canada
- Party: BC Reform; Social Credit
- Spouse: Judith Weisgerber

John Sylvester Weisgerber (June 12, 1940 – June 3, 2022) was a Canadian politician and businessman. He was a member of the Legislative Assembly in British Columbia. During his political career he was briefly the leader of the British Columbia Social Credit Party and the Reform Party of British Columbia. After leaving politics, he was appointed to the board of BC Hydro in 2001 and served as a member of the British Columbia Treaty Commission.

== Political career ==
Weisgerber was first elected to the British Columbia legislature in 1986 as a Social Credit Party of British Columbia candidate for Peace River South. He served in the Social Credit government in several posts including Minister of State for the Northeast and Nechako, Minister of Energy, Mines and Petroleum Resources, and as British Columbia's first Minister of Native Affairs.

When Social Credit was soundly defeated in the 1991 election, Weisgerber was one of only seven Socred candidates to win re-election. Weisgerber became interim leader of the party.

In 1994, after failed attempts to revive the party, Weisgerber became one of four Social Credit members of the legislature to switch allegiances, joining the fledgling Reform Party of British Columbia. BC Reform, as it was known, espoused similar policies to the Reform Party of Canada, but was a separate entity.

Weisgerber ran for the BC Reform leadership and was elected party leader in late 1994. Through 1995 and in the months before the 1996 election, Weisgerber faced challenges by some members of his party from southern Vancouver Island.

In the May 1996 election, the BC Reform Party won nine percent of the popular vote and two seats in the legislature, one of which was Weisgerber's in Peace River South. However, the party failed to win the four seats required for official party status in the British Columbia legislature. A split in the centre-right vote between Weisgerber's BC Reform Party and Gordon Campbell's Liberals is cited as a factor for the New Democratic Party winning the 1996 BC election.

Weisgerber resigned as BC Reform's leader in late 1996, and was replaced by Wilf Hanni in September 1997. Following a bruising round of party in-fighting, Weisgerber left Reform to sit as an independent member of the BC legislature. Weisgerber served out his third and final term in the BC legislature ending in 2001. He was the last surviving member of what proved to be the last Socred government.

Shortly before the 2001 election, Weisgerber endorsed the British Columbia Liberal Party and its leader, Gordon Campbell. After winning the election, Campbell appointed Weisgerber as a director of BC Hydro, beginning on September 25, 2001. He served in that position until July 19, 2017, when the BC Liberals lost power.

He was a Commissioner of the British Columbia Treaty Commission.

== Personal life ==
Jack was married to Judith Weisgerber (born Janke) to which they had two daughters; Joanne Wooldridge (born Weisgerber) and Pamela Haglof (born Weisgerber); and three grandsons Josh, Luke, and Cole and one granddaughter Jemma. He resided in Nanaimo, British Columbia, Canada. Weisgerber died on June 3, 2022, at the age of 81.
