= Reform Party of British Columbia =

Provincial political party in Canada

- Unregistered provincial party
- Leader: David Hawkins
- President: Ron Gamble
- Founded: 1982
- Headquarters: North Vancouver, British Columbia
- Ideology: Right-wing populism

The Reform Party of British Columbia, or Reform BC, is an unregistered right-wing populist political party in British Columbia, Canada. Although its name is similar to the defunct Reform Party of Canada, the provincial party was founded before the federal party was and it did not have any formal association with it. Their peak of support came in 1996 when they elected two members to the Legislative Assembly of British Columbia.

== Founding ==
The party was founded in 1982 as the Referendum Party and then registered as Reform BC with the B.C. Corporations Branch in 1983. The party's first candidates ran in the 1991 provincial election, when four candidates stood in the 75 ridings, receiving 2,673 votes, or 0.18% of the popular vote. That election saw the collapse of the British Columbia Social Credit Party, which was reduced to seven Members of the Legislative Assembly, four of these seven defected to Reform BC. This was done in part to capitalize on the popularity of the Reform Party of Canada. Despite attempts to take over Social Credit, Reform BC was unable to absorb it and lay claim to the right of the political spectrum.

In the May 28, 1996 election, the party nominated candidates in all of the province’s 75 ridings, and collected 146,734 votes (9.27% of the popular vote). Two party members were elected to office, but they won no further seats in subsequent elections.

== Decline ==
Many blamed Reform for splitting the right-wing vote and helping the New Democratic Party of British Columbia under Glen Clark get re-elected. The leader, Jack Weisgerber decided to step down as leader. At the August 30, 1997 leadership convention in Surrey, Wilf Hanni was elected leader over John Motiuk and Adrian Wade. Hanni, an oil industry worker, alienated both of the MLAs and drove them out of the party. Richard Neufeld crossed to the BC Liberals, and became a provincial cabinet minister before being appointed to the Canadian Senate on the recommendation of Prime Minister Stephen Harper in 2008. Jack Weisgerber would later become a director for BC Hydro, the power utility owned by the provincial government. The loss of the two MLAs was the effective end of the party.

== Failed merger into BC Unity ==
Following Hanni's resignation, at the November 12–13, 1999 leadership convention, former Social Credit premier Bill Vander Zalm was acclaimed as leader of the party. Vander Zalm attempted to orchestrate a merger of Reform with other right-wing parties, but ran into stiff opposition from a centrist old guard. Following some controversy over paperwork submission deadlines, the Reform Party was de-registered as a BC political party in February 2001. At the time, they were in second place in the polls, with a one percentage point lead over the NDP.

The Vander Zalm wing of the party later joined form the BC Unity Party, with members of four other right-wing parties (the British Columbia Social Credit Party, the British Columbia Conservative Party, the British Columbia Party, and the Family Coalition Party of British Columbia) to while other members re-registered "Reform BC" and swung back to the political centre.

In the 2001 provincial election, the Reform Party nominated eight candidates, receiving a total of 3,008 votes (0.22% of the total vote). In five ridings, Reform received over 2% of the vote, its best result being in Surrey-Green Timbers, where the party won 3.5% of the vote.

== Failed merger into Democratic Reform BC ==
In 2004, Reform BC became involved in efforts to create a new centrist coalition. On January 16, 2005, the Democratic Reform British Columbia (DRBC) party was created, taking much of Reform's executive with it. Other members of the party, however, decided to continue Reform BC.

The difference of opinion between the group that left for DRBC and those continuing Reform BC appears to revolve around three issues:

- Reform BC rejects the current referendum on Electoral Reform, whereas DRBC supports it.
- Reform BC rejects guaranteeing four seats in the Legislature exclusively for First Nations (aboriginal) people.
- Reform BC rejects the Kyoto Accord.

The party nominated one candidate to contest the 2005 election: Ron Gamble won 344 votes (1.76% of the total) in North Vancouver-Lonsdale. Under the leadership of David Charles Hawkins, BC Reform nominated four candidates in the 2009 election. None was elected. They won a total of 1,106 votes.

== Party leaders ==
1. Ron Gamble (September 1993 – January 15, 1995)
2. Jack Weisgerber (January 1995 – February 1997)
3. Wilf Hanni (August 1997 – June 1998)
4. Bill Vander Zalm (November 13, 1999 – 2001)
5. David Hawkins (current)

=== Leadership elections ===
Leadership convention on January 15, 1995:

1. Jack Weisgerber
2. Ron Gamble
3. Wilf Hanni
4. Terry Milne, 250 votes
5. Joe Leong

(Note: A total of 4,158 party members had the ability to cast a ballot.)

Leadership convention on October 30, 1997:

1. Wilf Hanni, elected on the second ballot, by 125 votes
2. Adrian Wade
3. John Motiuk, eliminated on the first ballot

(Wilf Hanni was removed as party leader in June 1998, at the same time that former Social Credit Premier Bill Vander Zalm was chosen as the party's President.)

Leadership convention on November 13, 1999:

1. Bill Vander Zalm, acclaimed

== Election results ==
Election	Leader	Candidates	Seats		Votes			
Election	Leader	Candidates	Seats won	+/−	Place	Votes	%	Change
1991	Ron Gamble	4 / 75	0 / 75	Steady	6th	10,281	0.70%	New
1996	Jack Weisgerber	75 / 75	2 / 75	▲2	▲3rd	146,734	9.27	▲9.09%
2001	None	9 / 79	0 / 79	▼2	▼7th	3,439	0.22%	▼9.05%
2005	None	1 / 79	0 / 79	Steady	▼19th	3,074	0.02	▼0.20%
2009	David Charles Hawkins	4 / 85	0 / 85	Steady	▲10th	1,106	0.07	0.05
