= Abbotsford-Mount Lehman =

Defunct provincial electoral district in British Columbia, Canada

British Columbia electoral district

Defunct provincial electoral district
- Legislature: Legislative Assembly of British Columbia
- District created: 1999
- District abolished: 2009
- First contested: 2001
- Last contested: 2005

Demographics
- Population (2001): 55,493
- Electors (2005): 34,226
- Area (km²): 160.65
- Census division: Fraser Valley Regional District
- Census subdivision: Abbotsford

Abbotsford-Mount Lehman was a provincial electoral district for the Legislative Assembly of British Columbia, Canada, from 2001 to 2009.

== Demographics ==
Population, 2001	55,493
Population Change, 1996–2001	14.5%
Area (km^{2})	160.65
Pop. Density (people per km^{2})	345

== 1999 electoral redistribution ==
Changes from Matsqui to Abbotsford-Mount Lehman include:

- Removal of the southeastern portion, in the Poplar and Mill Lake area

== Member of the Legislative Assembly ==
Its lone MLA was Hon. Mike de Jong, a former lawyer. He was first elected in 1994. He represents the British Columbia Liberal Party. Mr. de Jong was appointed Minister of Forests on June 5, 2001, and the Minister of Labour and Citizens' Services on June 16, 2005. He was re-elected in the newly created riding of Abbotsford West during the 2009 general election.

== Electoral history ==
2001 British Columbia general election
Party	Candidate	Votes	%	Expenditures
Liberal	Mike de Jong	12,660	68.48	$32,765
New Democratic	Taranjit Purewal	2,431	13.15	$2,775
Unity	Gloria Cavacece (Ewert)	1,576	8.53	$2,437
Green	Karl Hann	1,299	7.03	$223
Marijuana	Brian Carlisle	451	2.44	$394
People's Front	David MacKay	46	0.25	–
Freedom	Robert Wayne McCulloch	23	0.12	$100
Total valid votes		18,486	100.00	
Total rejected ballots		116	0.63	
Turnout		18,602	71.44	

2005 British Columbia general election
Party	Candidate	Votes	%
Liberal	Mike de Jong	11,325	57.55
New Democratic	Taranjit Purewal	6,132	31.16
Green	Jed Anderson	1,359	6.91
Democratic Reform	Robert Arthur Klassen	472	2.40
Marijuana	Timothy Lee Felger	392	1.99
Total		19,680	100.00

== See also ==
- List of British Columbia provincial electoral districts
- Canadian provincial electoral districts
