= Abbotsford-Clayburn =

Defunct provincial electoral district in British Columbia, Canada

British Columbia electoral district

Defunct provincial electoral district
- Legislature: Legislative Assembly of British Columbia
- District created: 1999
- District abolished: 2009
- First contested: 2001
- Last contested: 2005

Demographics
- Population (2001): 44,865
- Electors (2005): 31,312
- Area (km²): 81.43
- Census division(s): Fraser Valley Regional District
- Census subdivision(s): Abbotsford

Abbotsford-Clayburn was a provincial electoral district for the Legislative Assembly of British Columbia, Canada, from 2001 to 2009.

== Demographics ==
Population, 2001	44,865
Population Change, 1996–2001	4.6%
Area (km^{2})	81.43
Pop. Density (people per km^{2})	551

== Member of the Legislative Assembly ==
Its sole MLA was Hon. John van Dongen, a former dairy farmer who was first elected in 1995, representing the British Columbia Liberal Party. Mr. van Dongen was appointed Minister of Agriculture, Food and Fisheries on June 5, 2001.

== Electoral history ==
2001 British Columbia general election
Party	Candidate	Votes	%	Expenditures
Liberal	John van Dongen	12,584	72.51	$32,911
New Democratic	Kris Lind	2,096	12.08	$1,070
Unity	Peter Stiegelmar	1,751	10.09	$6,073
Marijuana	Don Fulford	706	4.07	$504
Freedom	Kenneth Montgomery Keillor	217	1.25	$107
Total valid votes		17,354	100.00	
Total rejected ballots		154	0.89	
Turnout		17,508	71.30	

2005 British Columbia general election
Party	Candidate	Votes	%
Liberal	John van Dongen	11,047	59.95
New Democratic	Michael Nenn	5,555	30.15
Green	Lance Pizzariello	1,428	7.75
Freedom	Kenneth Montgomery Keillor	199	1.08
Marijuana	Iain Gilfillan	198	1.07
Total		18,427	100.00

== See also ==
- List of British Columbia provincial electoral districts
- Canadian provincial electoral districts
