= Rick Thorpe =

Canadian politician

Member of the British Columbia Legislative Assembly for Okanagan-Westside Okanagan-Penticton (1996-2001)
- In office May 28, 1996 – May 12, 2009
- Preceded by: Jim Beattie
- Succeeded by: Ben Stewart

Minister of Competition, Science and Enterprise of British Columbia
- In office June 5, 2001 – January 26, 2004
- Premier: Gordon Campbell
- Preceded by: Position established
- Succeeded by: Position abolished

Minister of Provincial Revenue of British Columbia
- In office January 26, 2004 – June 23, 2008
- Premier: Gordon Campbell
- Preceded by: Bill Barisoff
- Succeeded by: Kevin Krueger

Minister responsible for Deregulation of British Columbia
- In office June 16, 2005 – June 23, 2008
- Premier: Gordon Campbell
- Preceded by: Kevin Falcon (Minister of State for Deregulation) (Note: Position vacant from January 26, 2004 to June 16, 2005.)
- Succeeded by: Kevin Krueger

Minister of Small Business of British Columbia
- In office June 16, 2005 – June 23, 2008
- Premier: Gordon Campbell
- Preceded by: John Les
- Succeeded by: Kevin Krueger

Personal details
- Born: Richard Thorpe; 1945 or 1946 (age 80–81) London, Ontario, Canada
- Party: BC Liberal
- Spouse: Yasmin John-Thorpe (m. 1973)

Rick Thorpe is a Canadian politician. He was formerly a member of the Legislative Assembly (MLA) of British Columbia, representing Okanagan-Penticton from 1996 to 2001, and Okanagan-Westside from 2001 to 2009. A caucus member of the British Columbia Liberal Party, he served in several cabinet posts under Premier Gordon Campbell.

== Biography ==
Born in London, Ontario, Thorpe grew up in the southwestern part of that province before meeting his wife Yasmin in Trinidad. The couple married in 1973, and have three children together. A Certified Management Accountant, Thorpe was employed in the brewing industry for 22 years, including at Labatt. The family lived in various places in Ontario, Saskatchewan, Newfoundland and Israel before settling in Penticton, British Columbia, where Thorpe became a partner in a winery. He also served as president of the Okanagan Wine Festival in 1994 and 1995.

He was nominated as the BC Liberal candidate in Okanagan-Penticton in May 1995, and was elected the riding's MLA in the 1996 provincial election. While the Liberals were the official opposition, Thorpe served as critic for small business, tourism and culture. With the riding being redistributed ahead of the 2001 election, Thorpe ran instead in Okanagan-Westside and was re-elected MLA there. The Liberals gained power in that election, and Thorpe was appointed to the cabinet by Premier Gordon Campbell that June to serve as Minister of Competition, Science and Enterprise, before being re-assigned as Minister of Provincial Revenue in January 2004.

Following his re-election in 2005, his cabinet post was modified to Minister of Small Business and Revenue, and he was additionally named Minister responsible for Deregulation. In June 2008 he announced his decision not to run in the next provincial election, and was dropped from the cabinet.

After finishing his term as MLA in May 2009, he registered as lobbyist for FortisBC in 2010. He went on to serve a two-year term as member of the board of management of the Canada Revenue Agency, then as the board's chair from 2013 to 2017. In addition, he served as director and vice-chair on the board of the Insurance Corporation of British Columbia from 2012 to 2014.

== Electoral record ==
2001 British Columbia general election: Okanagan-Westside
Party	Candidate	Votes	%	Expenditures
Liberal	Rick Thorpe	14,181	68.08	$39,628
New Democratic	Ernie Dmetro Ursuliak	3,176	15.25	$4,535
Unity	Howard Lionel Hunt	1,364	6.55	$591
Marijuana	Teresa Taylor	1,188	5.70	$1,120
Action	Jack W. Peach	921	4.42	$1,186
Total valid votes		20,830	100.00	
Total rejected ballots		127	0.61	
Turnout		20,957	69.91	

2005 British Columbia general election: Okanagan-Westside
Party	Candidate	Votes	%
Liberal	Rick Thorpe	12,148	54.39
New Democratic	Joyce Procure	6,873	30.77
Green	Angela Reid	2,262	10.13
Democratic Reform	Janice Marie Money	1,051	4.71
Total		22,334	100.00
