= Okanagan-Westside =

Defunct provincial electoral district in British Columbia, Canada

Okanagan-Westside was a provincial electoral district for the Legislative Assembly of British Columbia, Canada, from 2001 to 2009.

It included the cities of Westbank, Westside, Peachland, and Summerland, and extended from the city limits of Summerland (in the south) to the Okanagan Lake bridge, in Westside (north). Kelowna, the major city in the Okanagan, lies across the Okanagan Lake Bridge. Encompassing land in both the South and Central Okanagan, this constituency's lands are well known for their semi-arid climate and high summer temperatures.

== Demographics ==
Population, 2001	47,678
Population Change, 1996–2001	8.9%
Area (km^{2})	1,959
Pop. Density (people per km^{2})	24

== History ==
The area of this constituency was first settled in the late 19th and early 20th centuries by European agriculturalists. Fruit growing, especially apple and cherry crops, were a major industry, although tourism, logging, mining, and now viticulture, have also been major industries in the region. The Okanogan peoples, an Interior Salish language group, have settled the area for several thousand years.

=== 1999 redistribution ===
This electoral district was carved out of Okanagan West, Okanagan-Vernon, and Okanagan-Penticton.

=== 2008 redistribution ===
The electoral district was abolished in the 2008 re-distribution into Westside-Kelowna, Penticton, and Fraser-Nicola.

== Members of the Legislative Assembly ==
1. Rick Thorpe, Liberal (2001–2009)

== Election results ==
2001 British Columbia general election
Party	Candidate	Votes	%	Expenditures
Liberal	Rick Thorpe	14,181	68.08	$39,628
New Democratic	Ernie Dmetro Ursuliak	3,176	15.25	$4,535
Unity	Howard Lionel Hunt	1,364	6.55	$591
Marijuana	Teresa Taylor	1,188	5.70	$1,120
Action	Jack W. Peach	921	4.42	$1,186
Total valid votes		20,830	100.00	
Total rejected ballots		127	0.61	
Turnout		20,957	69.91	

2005 British Columbia general election
Party	Candidate	Votes	%
Liberal	Rick Thorpe	12,148	54.39
New Democratic	Joyce Procure	6,873	30.77
Green	Angela Reid	2,262	10.13
Democratic Reform	Janice Marie Money	1,051	4.71
Total		22,334	100.00

== See also ==
- List of British Columbia provincial electoral districts
- Canadian provincial electoral districts
- List of electoral districts in the Okanagan
