= Lorne Mayencourt =

Canadian politician

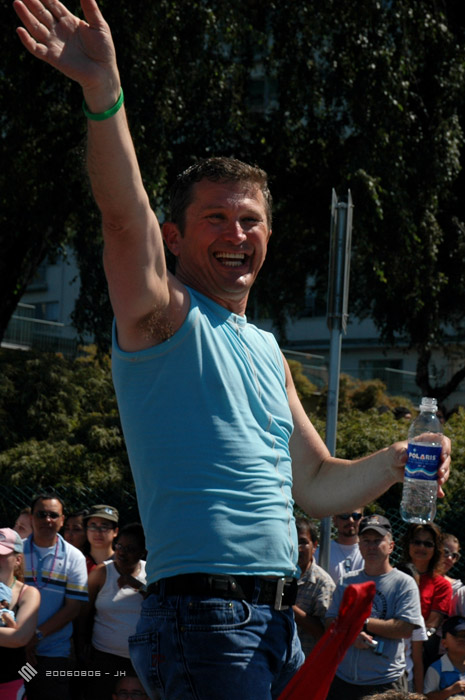

Member of the British Columbia Legislative Assembly for Vancouver-Burrard
- In office May 16, 2001 – September 13, 2008
- Preceded by: Tim Stevenson
- Succeeded by: Spencer Chandra Herbert

Personal details
- Born: 1957 (age 68–69)
- Party: BC Liberal (provincial); Conservative (federal)

Lorne Mayencourt (born 1957) is a Canadian politician, who formerly represented the electoral district of Vancouver-Burrard in the Legislative Assembly of British Columbia as a member of the BC Liberal party.

== Career ==
Mayencourt was first elected in the 2001 provincial election, defeating New Democrat opponent Tim Stevenson. He was previously the founder and, for its first five years, executive director of the Vancouver Friends for Life Society, which supports people living with AIDS, cancer and other life-threatening illnesses.

He is the founder of the BC New Hope Recovery Society and Baldy Hughes Therapeutic Community in North Central BC which supports addicts in a long-term recovery community.

In the 2005 election, conflicting results throughout the night had both Mayencourt and Stevenson declared the victor in Vancouver-Burrard, and the uncertainty continued for several weeks. In the final count of regular ballots, Stevenson was declared the winner by 17 votes; however, when absentee ballots were counted on May 30, Mayencourt was declared the winner by a margin of 18 votes. After a judicial recount, Mayencourt was declared the victor by 11 votes.

He is known for his Private Member's Bill called the Safe Streets Act (2004), which aimed to deter aggressive panhandling. He chaired the provincial Safe Schools Task Force (2003) and introduced the Safe Schools Act (2005) to combat bullying in the school system based on racism, sexism and homophobia. He introduced the Apology Act to facilitate sincere and timely reconciliation between government, business and citizens.

Mayencourt announced that he would not run in the 2009 provincial election, and resigned early to run as the Conservative Party of Canada's candidate in Vancouver Centre for the 2008 general election. He lost to incumbent Liberal MP Hedy Fry.

Mayencourt announced that he would seek the BC Liberal Party nomination in the riding of Vancouver-False Creek for the 2013 British Columbia general election after the current incumbent Mary McNeil announced she would not be seeking another term. His main competition was former Vancouver Mayor Sam Sullivan, who ended up winning the nomination and subsequently winning the election.

== Electoral record ==
2008 Canadian federal election: Vancouver Centre
Party	Candidate	Votes	%	±%	Expenditures
Liberal	Hedy Fry	19,506	34.51	–9.30	$82,559.50
Conservative	Lorne Mayencourt	14,188	25.10	+4.64	$90,565.43
New Democratic	Michael Byers	12,047	21.31	–7.36	$83,751.31
Green	Adriane Carr	10,354	18.32	+12.47	$83,134.82
Libertarian	John Clarke	340	0.60	+0.07	none listed
Marxist–Leninist	Michael Hill	94	0.17	–	none listed
Total valid votes/expense limit		56,529	99.67	–	$94,404.49
Total rejected ballots		187	0.33	+0.05	
Turnout		56,716	59.37	–2.69	
Eligible voters		95,537			
Liberal hold		Swing		–6.97	
Source: Elections Canada

2005 British Columbia general election: Vancouver-Burrard
Party	Candidate	Votes	%	±%	Expenditures
Liberal	Lorne Mayencourt	12,009	42.16	−5.94	$161,227
New Democratic	Tim Stevenson	11,998	42.12	+11.04	$67,587
Green	Janek Patrick John Kuchmistrz	3,698	12.98	−3.21	$8,237
Libertarian	John Clarke	388	1.36	–	$100
Work Less	Lisa Voldeng	170	0.60	–	$1,855
Sex	John Gordon Ince	111	0.39	–	$100
Democratic Reform	Ian McLeod	82	0.29	–	$400
Platinum	Antonio Francisco Ferreira	27	0.09	–	$100
Total valid votes		28,483	100		
Total rejected ballots		196	0.69		
Turnout		28,679	51.95		

2001 British Columbia general election: Vancouver-Burrard
Party	Candidate	Votes	%	±%	Expenditures
Liberal	Lorne Mayencourt	11,396	48.11	+10.88	$46,939
New Democratic	Tim Stevenson	7,359	31.07	−18.63	$45,493
Green	Robbie Mattu	3,826	16.15	+13.52	$1,029
Marijuana	Marc Emery	906	3.82	–	$394
Unity	Gregory Paul Michael Hartnell	290	1.15	–	–
Independent	Boris Bear	136	0.57	–	$157
People's Front	Joseph Theriault	40	0.17	–	$57
Independent Rhinoceros	Helvis	25	0.11	–	$100
Total valid votes		23,688	100.00		
Total rejected ballots		123	0.52		
Turnout		23,811	63.67		
