= 2005 British Columbia general election =

Canadian provincial election

- May 17, 2005

79 seats of the Legislative Assembly of British Columbia 40 seats were needed for a majority
- Turnout: 57.80% ▲2.75 pp
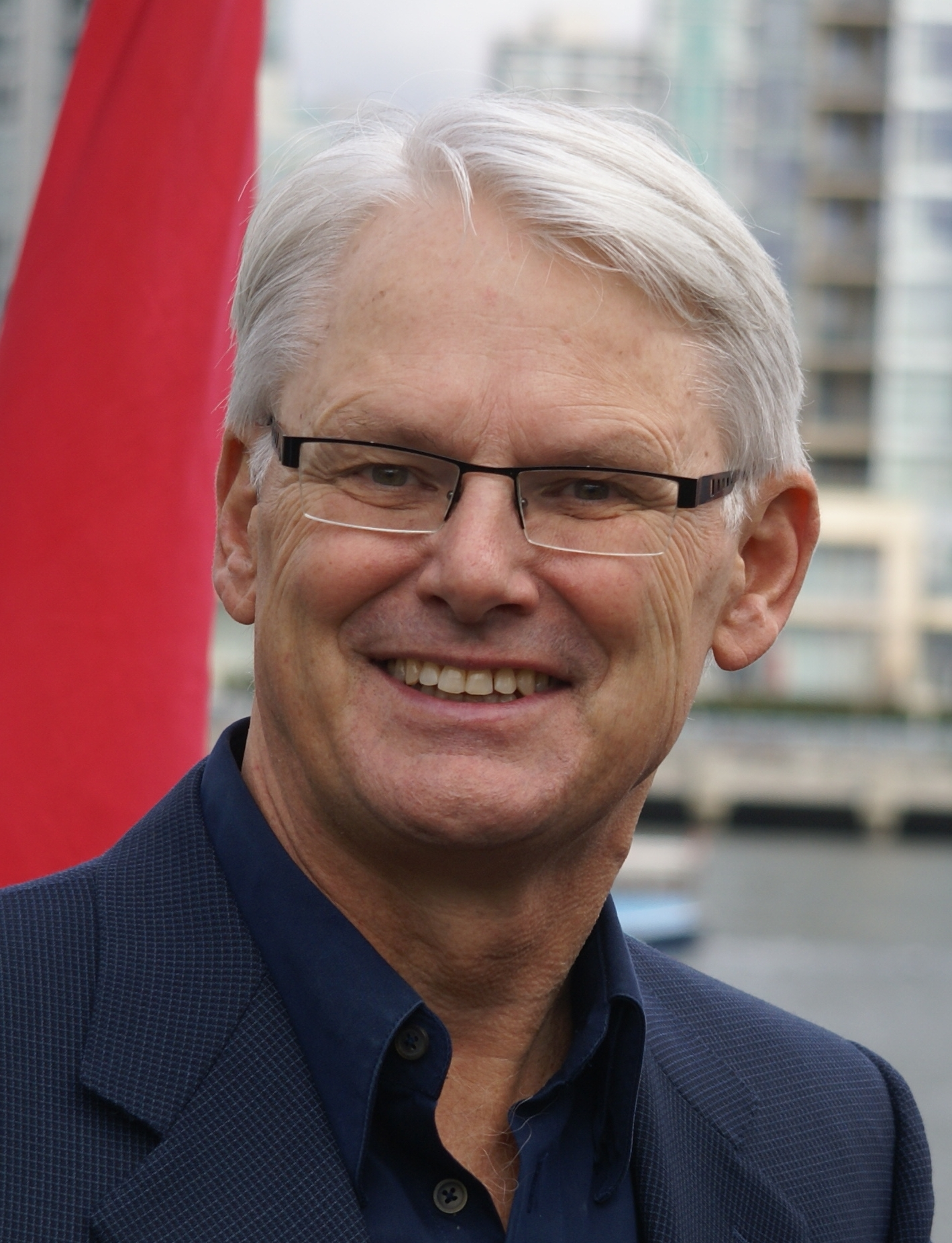

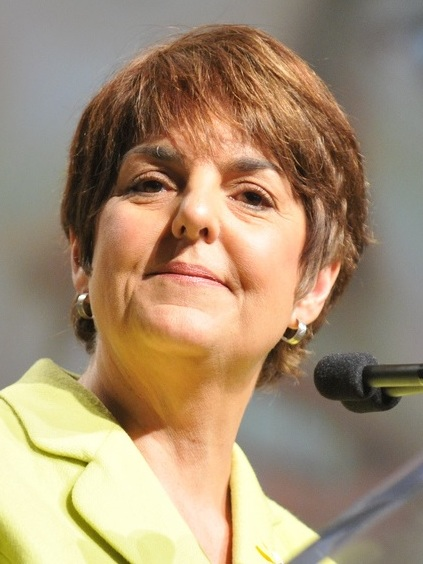

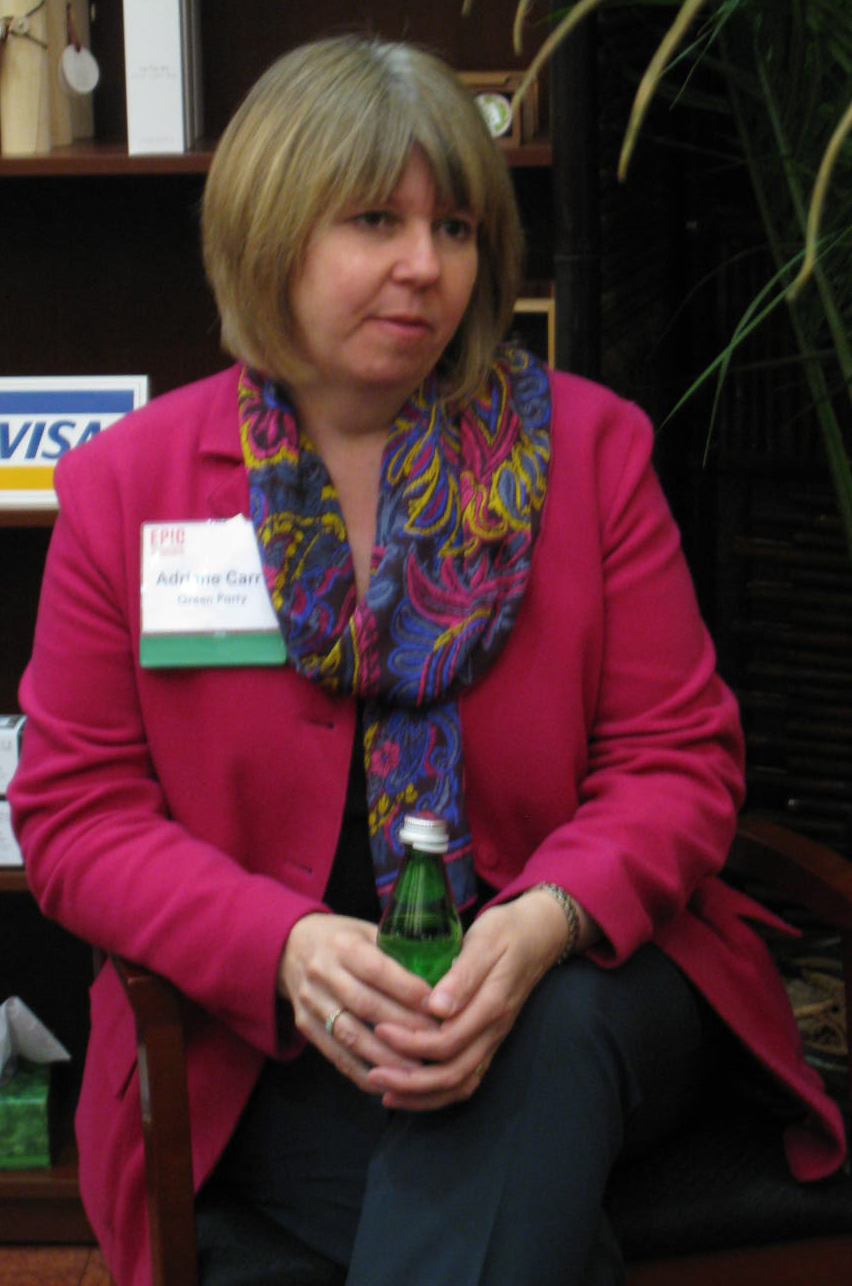
	First party	Second party	Third party
Leader	Gordon Campbell	Carole James	Adriane Carr
Party	Liberal	New Democratic	Green
Leader since	September 11, 1993	November 23, 2003	September 23, 2000
Leader's seat	Vancouver-Point Grey	Victoria-Beacon Hill	Ran in Powell River-Sunshine Coast (lost)
Last election	77 seats	2 seats	0 seats
Seats won	46	33	0
Seat change	▼31	▲31	Steady
Popular vote	807,118	731,719	161,842
Percentage	45.80%	41.52%	9.18%
Swing	▼11.82%	▲19.96%	▼3.22%
- Popular vote map by riding. Traditional areas of NDP support returned to the party fold after the preceding wipeout. Colourblind-friendly version
Premier before election
Gordon Campbell
Liberal
Premier after election
Gordon Campbell
Liberal

The 2005 British Columbia general election was held on May 17, 2005, to elect members of the Legislative Assembly (MLAs) of the Province of British Columbia (BC), Canada. The British Columbia Liberal Party (BC Liberals) formed the government of the province prior to this general election under the leadership of Premier Gordon Campbell. The main opposition was the British Columbia New Democratic Party (BC NDP), whose electoral representation was reduced to two MLAs in the previous provincial election in 2001.

The BC Liberals retained power, with a reduced majority of 46 out of 79 seats, down from the record 77 out of 79 in 2001. While the popularity of Campbell's government was affected by various factors such as its resolution of the Fast ferry scandal inherited from the previous NDP government, the sale of BC Rail, and Campbell being convicted for driving under the influence in January 2003, the overwhelming majority they earned at the previous election held up well enough for them to remain comfortably in control of the Legislative Assembly. Voter turnout was 58.2 per cent.

Under amendments to the BC Constitution Act passed in 2001, BC elections are now held on fixed dates: the second Tuesday in May every four years. This was the first provincial election for which elector data in the provincial elector list was synchronised with the National Register of Electors.

Coincidental with the general election, BC voters also voted on whether or not to change the province's electoral system.

== Electoral reform referendum ==
The BC electoral reform referendum was held in conjunction with this election. This referendum asked voters whether or not they support the proposed electoral reforms of the Citizens' Assembly on Electoral Reform, which included switching to a single transferable vote (STV) system. Had it been approved by 60% of voters in 60% of ridings), the new electoral system would have been implemented for the general election in 2009. Although the proposed reform attracted a clear majority (58% of the popular vote in favour, with 77 out of 79 ridings showing majority support), the level of support was just short of that required for mandatory implementation. A new vote on a revamped version of STV was held in conjunction with the 2009 British Columbia general election.

== Results ==
Elections to the 38th Legislative Assembly of British Columbia (2005)
Party	Leader	Candidates	Votes				Seats		
Party	Leader	Candidates	#	±	%	Change (pp)	2001	2005	±
Liberal	Gordon Campbell	79	807,118	109,770▼	45.80	-11.82	77	46 / 79	31▼
New Democratic	Carole James	79	731,783	388,677▲	41.52	19.96	2	33 / 79	31▲
Green	Adriane Carr	79	161,849	35,382▼	9.18	-3.21			
Independent		28	17,599	2,284▲	1.00	0.04			
Democratic Reform	Tom Morino	32	14,022	14,022▲	0.80	0.80			
Marijuana	Marc Emery	44	11,449	39,757▼	0.65	-2.57			
Unity	Daniel Stelmacker	1	224	51,202▼	0.01	-3.22			
Conservative	Barry Chilton	7	9,623	6,243▲	0.55	0.33			
Work Less	Conrad Schmidt	11	1,641	1,641▲	0.09	New			
Libertarian		6	1,053	1,053▲	0.06	New			
Platinum	Jeff Evans	11	779	779▲	0.04	New			
Refederation		4	675	675▲	0.04	New			
Social Credit	C. Barbara Woolsey	2	502	1,446▼	0.03	−0.09			
Your Political Party	James Filippelli	1	442	442▲	0.03	New			
Western Canada Concept	Douglas Christie	2	387	387▲	0.02	New			
People's Front	Charles Boylan	5	380	340▼	0.02	−0.02			
Youth Coalition		2	369	369▲	0.02	New			
Moderate Democratic Movement		2	367	367▲	0.02	New			
Reform		1	365	3,074▼	0.02	−0.20			
British Columbia Party	Grant Mitton	2	362	362▲	0.02	New			
Sex	John Ince	3	305	305▲	0.02	New			
Freedom	K.M. Keillor	2	282	42▲	0.02	–			
Bloc BC	Paddy Roberts	3	282	282▲	0.02	New			
Communist	George Gidora	3	244	137▼	0.01	−0.01			
Emerged Democracy	Tony Luck	1	151	151▲	0.01	New			
Patriot	Andrew Hokhold	2	90	8▲	0.01	–			
Total		412	1,762,343		100.00%				
Rejected ballots			11,926	3,467▲					
Turnout			1,774,269	174,504▲	62.36%	8.59▼			
Registered voters			2,845,284	590,364▲					

=== Vote and seat summaries ===
Ternary plots – shift of electoral support (2001–2005)
2001

2005
Electoral districts identified by colours of winning parties

== MLAs elected ==
Abbotsford-Clayburn: John van Dongen
Abbotsford-Mount Lehman: Mike de Jong
Alberni-Qualicum: Scott Fraser
Bulkley Valley-Stikine: Dennis MacKay
Burnaby-Edmonds: Raj Chouhan
Burnaby North: Richard Lee
Burnaby-Willingdon: John Nuraney
Burquitlam: Harry Bloy
Cariboo North: Bob Simpson
Cariboo South: Charlie Wyse
Chilliwack-Kent: Barry Penner
Chilliwack-Sumas: John Les
Columbia River-Revelstoke: Norm Macdonald
Comox Valley: Stan Hagen
Coquitlam-Maillardville: Diane Thorne
Cowichan-Ladysmith: Doug Routley
Delta North: Guy Gentner
Delta South: Val Roddick
East Kootenay: Bill Bennett
Esquimalt-Metchosin: Maurine Karagianis
Fort Langley-Aldergrove: Rich Coleman
Kamloops: Claude Richmond
Kamloops-North Thompson: Kevin Krueger
Kelowna-Lake Country: Al Horning
Kelowna-Mission: Sindi Hawkins
Langley: Mary Polak
Malahat-Juan de Fuca: John Horgan
Maple Ridge-Mission: Randy Hawes
Maple Ridge-Pitt Meadows: Michael Sather
Nanaimo: Leonard Krog
Nanaimo-Parksville: Ron Cantelon
Nelson-Creston: Corky Evans
New Westminster: Chuck Puchmayr
North Coast: Gary Coons
North Island: Claire Trevena
North Vancouver-Lonsdale: Katherine Whittred
North Vancouver-Seymour: Daniel Jarvis
Oak Bay-Gordon Head: Ida Chong
Okanagan-Vernon: Tom Christensen
Okanagan-Westside: Rick Thorpe
Peace River North: Richard Neufeld
Peace River South: Blair Lekstrom
Penticton-Okanagan Valley: Bill Barisoff
Port Coquitlam-Burke Mountain: Mike Farnworth
Port Moody-Westwood: Iain Black
Powell River-Sunshine Coast: Nicholas Simons
Prince George-Mount Robson: Shirley Bond
Prince George North: Pat Bell
Prince George-Omineca: John Rustad
Richmond Centre: Olga Ilich
Richmond East: Linda Reid
Richmond-Steveston: John Yap
Saanich North and the Islands: Murray Coell
Saanich South: David Cubberley
Shuswap: George Abbott
Skeena: Robin Austin
Surrey-Cloverdale: Kevin Falcon
Surrey-Green Timbers: Sue Hammell
Surrey-Newton: Harry Bains
Surrey-Panorama Ridge: Jagrup Brar
Surrey-Tynehead: Dave Hayer
Surrey-Whalley: Bruce Ralston
Surrey-White Rock: Gordon Hogg
Vancouver-Burrard: Lorne Mayencourt
Vancouver-Fairview: Gregor Robertson
Vancouver-Fraserview: Wally Oppal
Vancouver-Hastings: Shane Simpson
Vancouver-Kensington: David Chudnovsky
Vancouver-Kingsway: Adrian Dix
Vancouver-Langara: Val Anderson
Vancouver-Mount Pleasant: Jenny Kwan
Vancouver-Point Grey: Gordon Campbell
Vancouver-Quilchena: Colin Hansen
Victoria-Beacon Hill: Carole James
Victoria-Hillside: Rob Fleming
West Kootenay-Boundary: Katrine Conroy
West Vancouver-Capilano: Ralph Sultan
West Vancouver-Garibaldi: Joan McIntyre
Yale-Lillooet: Harry Lali

=== Synopsis of results ===
Results by riding – 2005 British Columbia general election
Riding	Winning party						Turnout (Note: including spoilt ballots)	Votes (Note: parties receiving more than 1% of the popular vote, or fielding candidates in at least half of the constituencies, are listed separately. Democratic Reform is highlighted, as it received more votes than the Marijuana Party while having fewer candidates. Conservatives are also listed separately, as they achieved significant 3rd and 4th places in several districts.)								
Name	2001	Party	Votes	Share	Margin #	Margin %	Turnout	Lib	NDP	Grn	DR	Mari	Con	Ind	Oth	Total
Abbotsford-Clayburn	Lib	Lib	11,047	59.95%	5,492	29.80%	59.50%	11,047	5,555	1,428	–	198	–	–	199	18,427
Abbotsford-Mount Lehman	Lib	Lib	11,325	57.55%	5,193	26.39%	57.97%	11,325	6,132	1,359	472	392	–	–	–	19,680
Alberni-Qualicum	Lib	NDP	13,988	52.61%	4,200	15.80%	69.02%	9,788	13,988	1,912	292	401	–	209	–	26,590
Bulkley Valley-Stikine	Lib	Lib	6,279	48.30%	1,102	8.48%	68.78%	6,279	5,177	769	354	205	–	–	216	13,000
Burnaby-Edmonds	Lib	NDP	10,337	46.71%	738	3.34%	57.70%	9,599	10,337	2,192	–	–	–	–	–	22,128
Burnaby North	Lib	Lib	10,421	45.59%	65	0.28%	59.76%	10,421	10,356	1,763	316	–	–	–	–	22,856
Burnaby-Willingdon	Lib	Lib	8,754	44.00%	399	2.01%	57.36%	8,754	8,355	1,482	947	214	–	142	–	19,894
Burquitlam	Lib	Lib	10,054	46.39%	372	1.72%	60.45%	10,054	9,682	1,619	–	191	–	125	–	21,671
Cariboo North	Lib	NDP	7,353	47.28%	269	1.73%	64.26%	7,084	7,353	835	–	281	–	–	–	15,553
Cariboo South	Lib	NDP	7,277	45.99%	114	0.72%	67.43%	7,163	7,277	851	–	–	–	532	–	15,823
Chilliwack-Kent	Lib	Lib	11,368	57.14%	4,834	24.30%	58.71%	11,368	6,534	1,651	–	–	–	–	343	19,896
Chilliwack-Sumas	Lib	Lib	11,995	57.36%	5,518	26.39%	59.98%	11,995	6,477	1,731	315	–	–	–	393	20,911
Columbia River-Revelstoke	Lib	NDP	7,460	51.71%	1,710	11.85%	62.47%	5,750	7,460	1,217	–	–	–	–	–	14,427
Comox Valley	Lib	Lib	14,068	45.73%	807	2.62%	68.34%	14,068	13,261	2,833	187	214	–	–	201	30,764
Coquitlam-Maillardville	Lib	NDP	10,532	46.96%	531	2.37%	63.41%	10,001	10,532	1,415	–	236	–	–	242	22,426
Cowichan-Ladysmith	Lib	NDP	14,014	50.02%	2,589	9.24%	71.86%	11,425	14,014	1,950	238	–	–	307	83	28,017
Delta North	Lib	NDP	10,481	47.46%	1,001	4.53%	64.24%	9,480	10,481	1,711	–	224	–	–	187	22,083
Delta South	Lib	Lib	9,112	37.48%	1,069	4.40%	70.81%	9,112	5,828	1,131	–	139	–	8,101 (Note: Vicki Huntington received 8,043 votes)	–	24,311
East Kootenay	Lib	Lib	8,060	48.01%	721	4.29%	60.03%	8,060	7,339	1,389	–	–	–	–	–	16,788
Esquimalt-Metchosin	Lib	NDP	12,545	49.63%	2,895	11.45%	66.89%	9,650	12,545	2,672	409	–	–	–	–	25,276
Fort Langley-Aldergrove	Lib	Lib	15,454	59.13%	7,857	30.06%	65.06%	15,454	7,597	2,529	–	374	–	–	183	26,137
Kamloops	Lib	Lib	11,261	47.58%	1,375	5.81%	61.81%	11,261	9,886	1,723	–	–	797	–	–	23,667
Kamloops-North Thompson	Lib	Lib	11,648	48.36%	2,013	8.36%	67.71%	11,648	9,635	1,689	–	321	795	–	–	24,088
Kelowna-Lake Country	Lib	Lib	12,247	50.37%	4,857	19.98%	54.88%	12,247	7,390	2,541	1,793	341	–	–	–	24,312
Kelowna-Mission	Lib	Lib	13,827	53.72%	5,638	21.91%	57.00%	13,827	8,189	3,308	–	320	–	–	94	25,738
Langley	Lib	Lib	12,877	52.18%	4,574	18.53%	61.68%	12,877	8,303	3,042	–	278	–	–	180	24,680
Malahat-Juan de Fuca	Lib	NDP	12,460	46.09%	1,932	7.15%	69.57%	10,528	12,460	2,610	1,256	–	–	–	180	27,034
Maple Ridge-Mission	Lib	Lib	12,095	44.30%	199	0.73%	63.31%	12,095	11,896	2,633	–	314	–	312	53	27,303
Maple Ridge-Pitt Meadows	Lib	NDP	11,786	46.38%	925	3.64%	64.23%	10,861	11,786	1,869	534	360	–	–	–	25,410
Nanaimo	Lib	NDP	13,226	51.90%	4,569	17.93%	62.83%	8,657	13,226	2,933	–	294	–	204	169	25,483
Nanaimo-Parksville	Lib	Lib	16,542	51.42%	4,110	12.78%	69.56%	16,542	12,432	2,714	–	198	–	–	283	32,169
Nelson-Creston	Lib	NDP	12,896	58.80%	7,034	32.07%	67.88%	5,862	12,896	2,724	–	276	–	–	173	21,931
New Westminster	Lib	NDP	13,226	51.32%	3,581	13.89%	63.91%	9,645	13,226	2,416	152	293	–	–	42	25,774
North Coast	Lib	NDP	5,845	53.77%	1,660	15.27%	60.86%	4,185	5,845	629	–	211	–	–	–	10,870
North Island	Lib	NDP	11,464	45.29%	660	2.61%	66.38%	10,804	11,464	1,874	699	–	–	471	–	25,312
North Vancouver-Lonsdale	Lib	Lib	9,375	44.51%	984	4.67%	64.31%	9,375	8,391	2,562	163	209	–	–	365	21,065
North Vancouver-Seymour	Lib	Lib	14,518	56.92%	6,923	27.14%	74.88%	14,518	7,595	3,013	–	212	–	–	169	25,507
Oak Bay-Gordon Head	Lib	Lib	13,443	47.52%	1,427	5.04%	73.63%	13,443	12,016	2,379	278	–	–	176	–	28,292
Okanagan-Vernon	Lib	Lib	11,566	43.20%	2,571	9.60%	61.10%	11,566	8,995	1,867	–	260	3,095	945	48	26,776
Okanagan-Westside	Lib	Lib	12,148	54.39%	5,275	23.62%	60.85%	12,148	6,873	2,262	1,051	–	–	–	–	22,334
Peace River North	Lib	Lib	5,498	59.37%	2,987	32.26%	47.36%	5,498	2,511	638	–	–	–	613	–	9,260
Peace River South	Lib	Lib	5,810	57.74%	2,514	24.99%	56.30%	5,810	3,296	956	–	–	–	–	–	10,062
Penticton-Okanagan Valley	Lib	Lib	13,650	50.23%	3,453	12.71%	62.61%	13,650	10,197	2,669	–	–	–	660	–	27,176
Port Coquitlam-Burke Mountain	Lib	NDP	11,844	48.14%	1,092	4.44%	64.29%	10,752	11,844	1,691	–	–	–	–	318	24,605
Port Moody-Westwood	Lib	Lib	14,161	53.75%	4,313	16.37%	60.57%	14,161	9,848	1,670	–	–	–	227	442	26,348
Powell River-Sunshine Coast	Lib	NDP	11,099	43.45%	3,397	13.30%	72.43%	7,702	11,099	6,585	–	–	–	–	156	25,542
Prince George-Mount Robson	Lib	Lib	5,885	41.06%	891	6.22%	58.41%	5,885	4,994	1,053	–	241	–	2,158 (Note: Paul Nettleton was the incumbent Liberal MLA in Prince George-Omineca.)	–	14,331
Prince George North	Lib	Lib	7,697	49.93%	2,099	13.62%	61.55%	7,697	5,598	1,201	241	235	–	443	–	15,415
Prince George-Omineca	Lib	Lib	8,622	51.71%	2,442	14.65%	64.22%	8,622	6,180	1,393	479	–	–	–	–	16,674
Richmond Centre	Lib	Lib	10,908	58.56%	4,857	26.08%	49.42%	10,908	6,051	1,436	–	231	–	–	–	18,626
Richmond East	Lib	Lib	11,652	57.48%	4,960	24.47%	53.01%	11,652	6,692	1,530	–	191	–	207	–	20,272
Richmond-Steveston	Lib	Lib	13,859	59.20%	6,525	27.87%	59.87%	13,859	7,334	1,934	282	–	–	–	–	23,409
Saanich North and the Islands	Lib	Lib	13,781	43.66%	1,939	6.14%	73.09%	13,781	11,842	4,846	1,092	–	–	–	–	31,561
Saanich South	Lib	NDP	12,809	46.08%	429	1.54%	72.03%	12,380	12,809	2,018	223	–	–	161	207	27,798
Shuswap	Lib	Lib	11,024	46.96%	2,743	11.68%	64.34%	11,024	8,281	1,394	–	356	2,330	–	92	23,477
Skeena	Lib	NDP	6,166	48.12%	359	2.80%	62.52%	5,807	6,166	616	–	–	–	–	224	12,813
Surrey-Cloverdale	Lib	Lib	16,429	61.64%	8,789	32.97%	65.49%	16,429	7,640	2,280	305	–	–	–	–	26,654
Surrey-Green Timbers	Lib	NDP	10,836	60.82%	5,217	29.28%	56.69%	5,619	10,836	791	142	225	–	–	203	17,816
Surrey-Newton	Lib	NDP	10,741	57.89%	4,268	23.00%	60.42%	6,473	10,741	876	268	–	–	–	195	18,553
Surrey-Panorama Ridge	Lib	NDP	11,553	53.17%	2,980	13.71%	62.00%	8,573	11,553	1,370	–	234	–	–	–	21,730
Surrey-Tynehead	Lib	Lib	12,052	51.37%	2,583	11.01%	59.14%	12,052	9,469	1,095	–	243	–	603	–	23,462
Surrey-Whalley	Lib	NDP	8,903	55.00%	3,954	24.43%	54.95%	4,949	8,903	1,238	607	302	–	139	50	16,188
Surrey-White Rock	Lib	Lib	16,462	57.86%	8,951	31.46%	67.91%	16,462	7,511	3,051	87	–	1,340	–	–	28,451
Vancouver-Burrard	Lib	Lib	12,009	42.16%	11	0.04%	51.95%	12,009	11,998	3,698	82	–	–	–	696	28,483
Vancouver-Fairview	Lib	NDP	13,009	46.59%	895	3.21%	60.64%	12,114	13,009	2,479	–	–	–	102	216	27,920
Vancouver-Fraserview	Lib	Lib	9,895	47.80%	1,112	5.37%	57.96%	9,895	8,783	1,374	–	650	–	–	–	20,702
Vancouver-Hastings	NDP	NDP	11,726	54.61%	4,816	22.43%	55.43%	6,910	11,726	1,928	–	188	–	130	589	21,471
Vancouver-Kensington	Lib	NDP	10,573	49.97%	1,624	7.67%	58.46%	8,949	10,573	1,273	–	266	–	–	99	21,160
Vancouver-Kingsway	Lib	NDP	10,038	51.44%	2,144	10.99%	54.19%	7,894	10,038	1,212	–	219	–	–	150	19,513
Vancouver-Langara	Lib	Lib	11,181	56.55%	4,661	23.57%	53.51%	11,181	6,520	1,591	–	144	–	–	336	19,772
Vancouver-Mount Pleasant	NDP	NDP	12,974	64.24%	8,676	42.96%	49.93%	4,298	12,974	2,066	43	308	–	205	302	20,196
Vancouver-Point Grey	Lib	Lib	12,498	45.98%	2,250	8.28%	60.94%	12,498	10,248	4,111	–	138	–	–	188	27,183
Vancouver-Quilchena	Lib	Lib	16,394	67.16%	11,263	46.14%	61.64%	16,394	5,131	2,538	–	175	–	–	174	24,412
Victoria-Beacon Hill	Lib	NDP	16,081	57.03%	7,460	26.46%	64.12%	8,621	16,081	3,077	169	–	–	247	–	28,195
Victoria-Hillside	Lib	NDP	13,926	57.00%	6,884	28.18%	62.74%	7,042	13,926	2,934	363	–	–	–	167	24,432
West Kootenay-Boundary	Lib	NDP	13,318	60.26%	7,138	32.30%	68.63%	6,180	13,318	1,561	–	–	802	180	59	22,100
West Vancouver-Capilano	Lib	Lib	14,665	68.27%	10,765	50.11%	66.14%	14,665	3,900	2,648	–	147	–	–	122	21,482
West Vancouver-Garibaldi	Lib	Lib	11,808	50.35%	5,573	23.76%	61.57%	11,808	4,947	6,235	–	–	464	–	–	23,454
Yale-Lillooet	Lib	NDP	8,432	48.90%	1,483	8.60%	66.97%	6,949	8,432	1,566	183	–	–	–	112	17,242

= Open seat
= turnout is above provincial average
= winning candidate was in previous Legislature
= Incumbent had switched allegiance
= Previously incumbent in another riding
= Not incumbent; was previously elected to the Legislature
= Incumbency arose from by-election gain
= other incumbents renominated
= previously an MP in the House of Commons of Canada
= Multiple candidates

=== Summary analysis ===
Party candidates in 2nd place
Party in 1st place	Party in 2nd place				Total
Party in 1st place	Lib	NDP	Grn	Ind	Total
Liberal		44	1	1	46
New Democratic	33				33
Total	33	44	1	1	79

Candidates ranked 1st to 5th place, by party
Parties	1st	2nd	3rd	4th	5th
█ New Democratic	33	44	2		
█ Liberal	46	33			
█ Green		1	74	4	
█ Independent		1	1	7	11
█ Conservative			2	5	
█ Marijuana				25	15
█ Democratic Reform				22	6
█ Libertarian				2	3
█ Refederation				2	
█ Social Credit				2	
█ Freedom				1	
█ Moderate Democratic Movement				1	
█ Sex				1	
█ Your Political Party				1	
█ Reform				1	
█ Unity				1	
█ Work Less					8
█ People's Front					3
█ Platinum					2
█ Western Canada Concept					2
█ Youth Coalition					2
█ British Columbia Party					1
█ Communist					1
█ Emerged Democracy					1
█ Progressive Nationalist					1

Resulting composition of the 38th Legislative Assembly of British Columbia
Source		Party		
Source		Lib	NDP	Total
Seats retained	Incumbents returned	36	1	37
Seats retained	Open seats held	10	1	11
Seats changing hands	Incumbents defeated		20	20
Seats changing hands	Open seats gained – new MLAs		8	8
Seats changing hands	Open seats gained – taken by candidates who had previously been MLAs		2	2
Seats changing hands	Byelection gains held		1	1
Total		46	33	79

== Results by region ==
Party name		Van.	Van. East Sub.	North Shore/ Sun. C.	Rich./ Delta/ Surrey	Van. Island	Fraser Valley	Interior	North	Total
BC Liberal	Seats:	5	4	4	7	4	7	9	6	46
BC Liberal	Popular Vote:	44.3%	44.9%	49.6%	48.2%	40.7%	53.2%	44.9%	48.8%	45.8%
New Democrats	Seats:	5	4	1	5	9	1	6	2	33
New Democrats	Popular Vote:	43.7%	45.3%	30.7%	39.6%	47.1%	35.2%	41.5%	38.7%	41.5%
Total seats:		10	8	5	12	13	8	15	8	79
Parties that won no seats:
Green	Popular Vote:	9.6%	7.7%	18.0%	7.1%	9.6%	8.9%	8.6%	7.1%	9.2%
Democratic Reform	Popular Vote:	0.1%	0.8%	0.1%	0.6%	1.4%	0.7%	0.9%	1.0%	0.8%
Marijuana	Popular Vote:	0.9%	0.5%	0.5%	0.7%	0.3%	1.1%	0.7%	0.9%	0.7%
Conservative	Popular Vote:	-	-	0.4%	0.1%	-	-	2.4%	-	0.6%
Work Less	Popular Vote:	0.4%	-	0.2%	xx	0.1%	-	-	-	0.1%
Libertarian	Popular Vote:	0.3%	0.1%	-	-	-	-	-	-	0.1%
Platinum	Popular Vote:	0.1%	0.1%	-	xx	-	0.2%	-	-	xx
Refederation	Popular Vote:	-	-	0.1%	-	0.1%	-	-	-	xx
Social Credit	Popular Vote:	0.1%	0.1%	-	-	-	-	-	-	xx
Your Political Party	Popular Vote:	-	0.2%	-	-	-	-	-	-	xx
Western Canada Concept	Popular Vote:	-	-	-	-	0.1%	-	-	-	xx
People's Front	Popular Vote:	0.1%	-	-	-	xx	-	xx	xx	xx
Youth Coalition	Popular Vote:	-	-	-	-	-	0.2%	-	-	xx
Moderates	Popular Vote:	-	-	-	-	-	0.2%	-	-	xx
Reform	Popular Vote:	-	-	0.3%	-	-	-	-	-	xx
British Columbia Party	Popular Vote:	-	-	-	0.1%	-	-	-	0.2%	xx
Sex	Popular Vote:	0.1%	-	-	-	-	-	-	-	xx
Bloc	Popular Vote:	-	-	-	-	-	-	0.1%	-	xx
Freedom	Popular Vote:	-	-	-	-	xx	0.1%	-	-	xx
Communist	Popular Vote:	xx	-	-	xx	-	-	xx	-	xx
Unity	Popular Vote:	-	-	-	-	-	-	-	0.2%	xx
Emerged Democracy	Popular Vote:	-	-	-	0.1%	-	-	-	-	xx
Patriot	Popular Vote:	-	-	-	-	-	-	xx	-	xx
Independents/ No Affiliation	Popular Vote:	0.2%	0.3%	-	3.5%	0.5%	0.2%	0.7%	3.1%	1.0%

xx Denotes party received less than 0.1%

== Timeline ==
=== Pre-campaign period ===
- August 30, 2001 – Bill 7, Constitution Amendment Act is passed, fixing the date of the election at May 17, 2005.
- November 13, 2002 – Liberal MLA Paul Nettleton accuses the government of a secret plan to privatize BC Rail as well the BC Hydro electric utility. He is removed from caucus several days later and sits as an Independent Liberal until the 2005 election, when he unsuccessfully ran in Prince George-Mount Robson against Shirley Bond. BC Rail was subsequently sold to CN in what other bidders have described as a corrupted process, and BC Hydro's administrative arm was sold to Accenture.
- January 9, 2003 – Premier Gordon Campbell is arrested for driving under the influence of alcohol on Maui. Because drunk driving is not a criminal offence in the state of Hawaii, but only a misdemeanour, Campbell did not resign his seat as he would have had to in Canada, and due to pressure from Mothers Against Drunk Driving (MADD) he attended Alcoholics Anonymous meetings and a series of speaking engagements condemning drinking and driving.
- November 23, 2003 – Carole James is elected as leader of the New Democratic Party of British Columbia.
- December 28, 2003 – the RCMP execute search warrants on various locations in the Lower Mainland and Greater Victoria, including offices in the Parliament Buildings in Victoria, in relation to suspicious dealings in relation to the bidding process for the sale of BC Rail (see BC Legislature Raids).
- March 22, 2004 – Liberal MLA Elayne Brenzinger quits the caucus citing a "secret agenda" being undertaken by Premier Campbell in relation to the sale of BC Rail.
- September 17, 2004 – Deputy Premier Christy Clark, whose house had been searched under warrant by the RCMP in connection with the BC Legislature Raids investigation, quits politics saying she wanted to spend more time with her family.
- October 22, 2004 – New Democrat Jagrup Brar wins a by-election in Surrey-Panorama Ridge with 53.6% of the vote, a swing of 33.7% to the NDP from the 2001 result. One of Brar's competitors was Green leader Adriane Carr who captured 8.4% of the vote.
- December 14, 2004 – In the wake of revelations he had been under surveillance by the RCMP in connection with dealings concerning the sale of BC Rail, Liberal Finance Minister Gary Farrell-Collins abruptly resigns from cabinet and the legislature despite having been named co-chair of the Liberal re-election campaign a month earlier. The move requires Premier Campbell to undertake a minor cabinet shuffle.
- January 15, 2005 – The Democratic Reform British Columbia party is created out of a merger of the British Columbia Democratic Coalition and the All Nations Party of British Columbia. The party also boasts the support of key elements of the Reform Party of British Columbia. Prior to the official creation of this party, the Democratic Coalition and Reform BC jointly nominated a candidate for the Surrey-Panorama Ridge by-election.
- January 19, 2005 – Independent MLA Elayne Brenzinger joins DRBC, adding a third party to the Legislative Assembly for the first time since Gordon Wilson folded his Progressive Democratic Alliance party and joined the NDP.
- January 31, 2005 – Liberal MLA and then-cabinet minister Sandy Santori resigns from his seat in the Legislature in a dispute over the deletion of emails by Premier Gordon Campbell's Deputy Minister to the Premier, Ken Dobell.
- February 15, 2005 – New Liberal Finance Minister Colin Hansen introduces what is widely viewed as an "election budget" which promised $1.3 billion in new spending, tax cuts and an economic surplus.
- March 11, 2005 – Attorney-General Geoff Plant announces that he will not seek re-election.
- March 15, 2005 – Canadian Broadcasting Corporation board chair Carole Taylor announces that she will run for the Liberals in the riding of Vancouver-Langara. Premier Gordon Campbell endorses Taylor's candidacy.
- March 29, 2005 – The consortium of television stations organizing the leaders' debate announces that the leaders of the Liberal, New Democratic, and Green parties will be invited to participate in the debate.
- April 13, 2005 – The NDP and Green Party release their platforms in Victoria.

=== Campaign period ===
- April 19, 2005 – The writ of election is issued (not "dropped" as in past elections), dissolving the Legislature and beginning the official campaign period.
- April 20, 2005 – The NDP becomes the first party to complete a province-wide nomination slate.
- April 22, 2005 – NDP candidate Rollie Keith withdraws his candidacy in Chilliwack-Kent after telling the Vancouver Province that he was "impressed" when he met Slobodan Milošević and that he did not believe there had been war crimes committed in Kosovo.
- May 3, 2005 – The leaders of the Liberal, NDP and Green parties meet in a televised debate. Commentators indicate the debate was either a draw or a win for Green leader Adriane Carr. An Ipsos-Reid poll conducted online following the debate showed that 33% of debate views thought the debate produced no clear winner, 31% felt NDP leader Carole James won, 23% felt Liberal leader Gordon Campbell won while only 12% saw Carr as the winner.
- May 17, 2005 – CBC projects a BC Liberal majority government at 9:05 p.m. local time.
- June 22, 2005 – Tim Stevenson, who lost to Lorne Mayencourt by 11 votes, asks the Supreme Court of British Columbia to order a new election in Vancouver-Burrard due to 70 ballots that could not be counted because they had not been initialed by election officials.

== Opinion polls ==
=== Voter intention polling ===

Evolution of voting intentions at provincial level
Polling firm	Last day of survey	Source	Liberal	NDP	Green	Unity	Other	ME	Sample
Voting results			45.80	41.52	9.18	0.01	3.49		
Strategic	11 May 2005	HTML	49	36	13	—N/a	2	—N/a	—N/a
Ipsos	10 May 2005	1 · 2	47	39	11	—N/a	3	± 3.5	1,050
Mustel	9 May 2005	HTML	45	40	12	—N/a	3	—N/a	—N/a
Robbins SCE	5 May 2005	HTML	39	40	13	—N/a	8	—N/a	—N/a
The writ of election is issued (19 April 2005)
Ipsos	26 April 2005	1 · 2	46	39	13	—N/a	2	± 3.5	1,050
Nordic	6 April 2005	HTML	43	34	14	—N/a	8	—N/a	—N/a
Ipsos	14 March 2005	1 · 2	46	39	12	—N/a	4	± 3.5	800
Ipsos	30 November 2004	1 · PDF	44	41	12	0	3	± 3.5	800
Ipsos	15 September 2004	1 · PDF	40	38	16	3	3	± 3.5	800
Ipsos	7 July 2004	1 · 2	37	38	18	4	3	± 3.5	800
Ipsos	7 March 2004	1 · 2	39	42	12	5	1	± 3.5	800
Ipsos	8 December 2003	1 · PDF	41	37	14	5	4	± 3.5	800
Carole James is elected as NDP leader (23 November 2003)
Ipsos	9 September 2003	1 · PDF	45	31	17	4	4	± 3.5	800
Ipsos	12 May 2003	1 · PDF	44	28	18	5	5	± 3.5	800
Ipsos	10 March 2003	1 · PDF	44	30	19	3	3	± 3.5	800
Ipsos	13 January 2003	1 · PDF	41	34	18	3	4	± 3.5	800
Ipsos	9 December 2002	1 · PDF	44	31	17	5	3	± 3.5	800
Ipsos	11 September 2002	HTML	43	28	19	5	5	± 3.5	800
Ipsos	11 June 2002	HTML	48	25	18	5	5	± 3.5	800
Ipsos	8 May 2002	1 · 2	45	27	20	4	4	± 3.5	800
Ipsos	11 March 2002	1 · 2	48	28	16	3	5	± 3.5	800
Ipsos	10 December 2001	1 · 2	50	21	17	8	3	± 3.5	800
Ipsos	21 September 2001	HTML	62	15	14	3	5	—N/a	—N/a
Joy MacPhail is appointed as NDP interim leader (16 June 2001)
Election 2001			57.62	21.56	12.39	3.23	5.20		

Besides the usual public polling by market research firms, other organizations have been attempting to predict the results of the upcoming election using alternate methods. Results suggest that all three projections below underestimated NDP seats and overestimated Liberal seats:

UBC's Election Stock Market tracks the prices of contracts whose value depend on election results:
Popular vote: Lib 44.5%, NDP 35.9%, Green 13.9%, Other 5.3%
Seats: Lib 48.6 (61.5), NDP 29.4 (37.2), Other 1.6 (2.0)
(values in parentheses are values of actual contracts, in cents)

The Election Prediction Project aggregates submissions from the Internet and subjectively predicts winners based on the submissions (see methodology):
Seats: Lib 50, NDP 29, Other 0

Will McMartin at the progressive online newspaper The Tyee makes his predictions by looking at "historic election results and selected demographics, as well as public opinion polls, regional sources and input from Election Central readers" (see details):
Seats: Lib 51, NDP 28, Other 0.

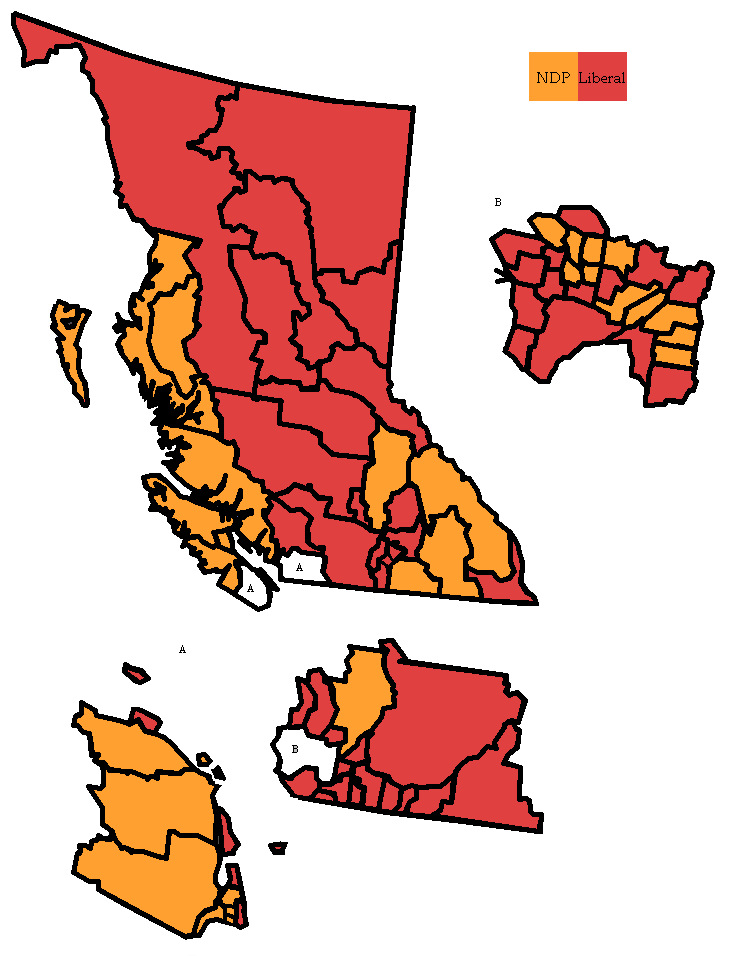
BC battleground map based on the predictions aggregated by the Election Prediction Project.

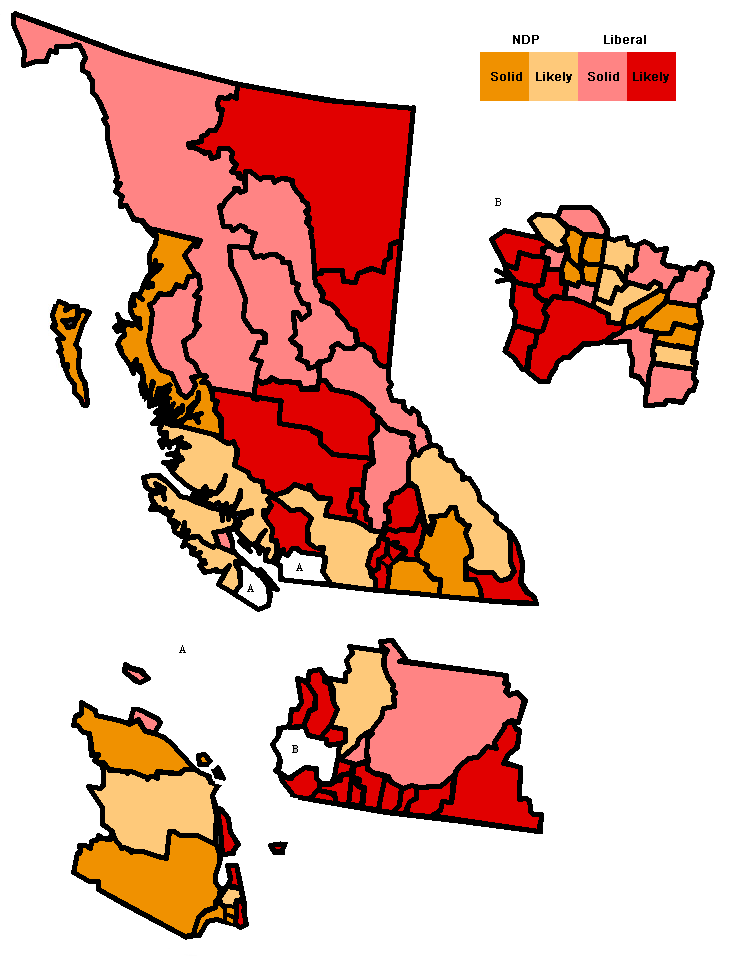
BC battleground map based on the predictions by Will McMartin on The Tyee.

== Political parties ==
British Columbia has Canada's least restrictive elections laws with regard to political party registration, and consequently there are currently nearly 50 parties registered with Elections BC, by far the most of any jurisdiction in the country. Twenty-five parties contested the 2005 election, also a considerably greater number than anywhere else in Canada.

=== British Columbia Liberal Party ===
Leader: Gordon Campbell

The BC Liberals won 77 of 79 seats in the 2001 election. At dissolution, the party held 72 seats. One member elected as a Liberal left the party to sit as a member of Democratic Reform British Columbia; one member elected as a Liberal left to sit as an independent; the party lost one by-election to the opposition New Democratic Party; and two former Liberal seats were vacant when the election was called. In 2005 election, the Liberal party dropped from 72 to 46 seats in the legislature, yet still won the election.

=== New Democratic Party of British Columbia ===
Leader: Carole James

The NDP's legislative caucus was reduced from a majority to just two seats in the 2001 election. It won another seat in an October 2004 by-election to bring the total to three. Carole James led the NDP to 33 seats to become the Leader of the Opposition.

=== Green Party of British Columbia ===
Leader: Adriane Carr

The Green Party ran 72 candidates in 2001, winning 12 percent of the vote but no seats in the legislature. Some argued that the Green Party support peaked in 2001, drawing on dissatisfied NDP voters, and they would remain incapable of winning a seat in 2005 under the First-Past-the-Post system; others believed that if there had been four or more competitive parties in this election, the Greens might elect a handful of members. Alternatively, if they had received more votes, they would have been more likely to win a seat. The Greens may benefit if a later election is conducted using the proposed BC-STV system. In 2005, the Greens received 9% of the popular vote and no seats.

=== Democratic Reform British Columbia ===
Leader: Tom Morino

Democratic Reform British Columbia is a new party created in early 2005 by the merger of the British Columbia Democratic Coalition—a coalition of minor centrist parties— with the All Nations Party of British Columbia and key elements of the Reform BC. Independent MLA Elayne Brenzinger, a former Liberal, became DRBC's first MLA on January 19, 2005. Controversially, no invitation was extended for Morino to participate in the leader's debate.

=== British Columbia Marijuana Party ===
Leader: Marc Emery

The BC Marijuana Party nominated 43 candidates in this election. It was the only party other than the Liberals and NDP to run candidates in all 79 districts in 2001. The party chose not to run in certain districts and instead endorse New Democrat and Green candidates who publicly favour the legalization of marijuana. Party founder Marc Emery ran against Solicitor General Rich Coleman, an anti-drug hardliner, in staunchly conservative Fort Langley-Aldergrove. He gained controversy early in the campaign for claiming that the government spends too much money on senior citizens.

=== Minor parties ===
Work Less Party of British Columbia

Leader: Conrad Schmidt

The WLP is an anti-materialist political movement that hopes to achieve socialist and green ends through, among other things, the promotion of a four-day work-week. The 2005 BC election marked the debut in Western politics of any registered party expressly driven by the ideology of voluntary simplicity. It nominated 11 candidates, all in urban ridings.

Platinum Party of Employers Who Think and Act to Increase Awareness

Leader: Jeff Evans

Nominated eleven candidates.

British Columbia Conservative Party

Leader: Barry Chilton

Nominated seven candidates. Former provincial affiliate of the Progressive Conservative Party of Canada

British Columbia Libertarian Party

No registered leader

Nominated six candidates. Provincial affiliate of the Libertarian Party of Canada

People's Front

Leader: Charles Boylan

Nominated five candidates. Provincial affiliate of the Communist Party of Canada (Marxist-Leninist).

Western Refederation Party of British Columbia

No registered leader

A new autonomist/separatist party that nominated four candidates around the province.

Communist Party of British Columbia

Leader: George Gidora

Nominated three candidates. Provincial affiliate of the Communist Party of Canada.

Sex Party

Leader: John Ince

Nominated three candidates in the City of Vancouver. Billed itself as "the world's first sex-positive party."

Bloc British Columbia Party

Leader: Paddy Roberts

Libertarian separatist movement. Nominated three candidates in the Interior.

British Columbia Social Credit Party

No registered leader

Although Social Credit governed British Columbia for most of the period from 1952 to 1991, the party is now a minor party, with little organization or support. It nominated the minimum two candidates in order to retain party status this election.

Freedom Party of British Columbia

Leader: Kenneth Montgomery Keillor

Nominated two candidates.

British Columbia Patriot Party

Leader: Andrew Hokhold

Nominated two candidates.

Western Canada Concept Party of British Columbia

Leader: Doug Christie

Although the WCC did not run in the 2001 election, it has been a constant, if minor, force in the BC political fringes for decades. Christie, its controversial leader, and a second candidate were nominated by the party in Greater Victoria.

British Columbia Party

Leader: Grant Mitton

The BC Party is also a relatively old minor party, one of several populist conservative organizations that attempted to fill the vacuum after the collapse of Social Credit in the mid-nineties. This was the first election in which it nominated candidates. It nominated two candidates. A third possible candidate, Summer Davis in Surrey-Tynehead, ran as an independent.

British Columbia Moderate Democratic Movement

No registered leader

The majority of the Moderates, including leader Matthew Laird, joined DRBC. The party's registration did not lapsed, however. The two candidates running under its banner opposed the merger.

British Columbia Youth Coalition

No registered leader.

Nominated two candidates.

British Columbia Unity Party

Interim Leader: Daniel Stelmacker

BC Unity finished fourth in 2001, winning slightly over 3% of the vote with a slate of 56 candidates. It stood poised to potentially benefit from right-of-centre voters disenchanted with Campbell, but instead fell victim to serious internal division following a failed merger with the BC Conservative Party, which led to Chris Delaney's resignation as party leader. It appointed Daniel Stelmacker as its interim leader until it can hold a full leadership convention in the autumn of 2005. Stelmacker was its only nominated candidate, in Skeena riding.

Reform Party of British Columbia

No registered leader

Aborted mergers with BC Unity and DRBC drained supporters left and right from BC Reform, leaving only a tiny core of what was briefly BC's third party. Party founder Ron Gamble was the party's sole candidate in North Vancouver-Lonsdale.

Your Political Party of British Columbia

Leader: James Filippelli

YPP appears to be a one-man political movement; its website made mention of no figures other than Filippelli, the party's founder and leader, who was its sole candidate in this election. He ran in Port Moody-Westwood.

Emerged Democracy Party of British Columbia

Leader: Tony Luck

Nominated one candidate, Rob Nordberg, in Surrey-Green Timbers.
