= Family Coalition Party =

Family Coalition Party is the name of two political parties in Canada:

- Family Coalition Party of British Columbia (1991–2000), a political party in British Columbia
- Family Coalition Party of Ontario, a former name of New Reform Party of Ontario
