= Burquitlam (electoral district) =

Defunct provincial electoral district in British Columbia, Canada

Coordinates: 49.260°N 122.864°W

Burquitlam was a provincial electoral district for the Legislative Assembly of British Columbia, Canada, from 2001 to 2009.

== Demographics ==
Population, 2001	53,881
Population Change, 1996–2001	5.1%
Area (km^{2})	34.56
Pop. Density (People per km^{2})	1,559

== Geography ==
The area of the Burquitlam riding included parts of both Burnaby and Coquitlam in the eastern suburbs of Vancouver. The riding straddled the border between the two cities.

== Member of the Legislative Assembly ==
Its only member of the Legislative Assembly (MLA) was Harry Bloy, a former president of a local telecommunications company. He was elected in 2001 and 2005, as a member of the British Columbia Liberal Party.

== Election results ==
2005 British Columbia general election: Burquitlam
Party	Candidate	Votes	%	±	Expenditures
Liberal	Harry Bloy	10,054	46.39%		$106,258
NDP	Bart Healey	9,682	44.68%		$47,079
Green	Carli Irene Travers	1,619	7.47%	–	$450
Marijuana	Peter Grin	191	0.88%		$100
Independent	Graham "Evil Genius" Fox	125	0.58%		$121
Total valid votes		21,671	100%		
Total rejected ballots		146	0.67%		
Turnout		21,817	60.45%		

2001 British Columbia general election: Burquitlam
Party	Candidate	Votes	%	±	Expenditures
Liberal	Harry Bloy	11,131	56.34%		$44,974
NDP	Bart Healey	4,678	23.68%		$26,422
Green	Stephen J. Mancinelli	2,668	13.50%	–	$4,124
Unity	Greg Watrich	749	3.79%		$3,723
Marijuana	Peter Grin	530	2.69%		$505
Total valid votes		19,756	100.00%		
Total rejected ballots		190	0.96%		
Turnout		19,946	70.95%		

== See also ==
- List of British Columbia provincial electoral districts
- Canadian provincial electoral districts
