= Elections BC =

Non-partisan election agency in British Columbia, Canada

Agency overview
- Formed: 1995
- Jurisdiction: British Columbia
- Headquarters: 100-1112 Fort Street, Victoria, British Columbia
- Employees: 44 (permanent); up to 32,000 (election period)
- Annual budget: $8,961,000
- Agency executive: Shipra Verma, chief electoral officer
- Website: elections.bc.ca

Elections BC (formally the Office of the Chief Electoral Officer of British Columbia) is a non-partisan office of the Legislative Assembly of British Columbia responsible for conducting provincial elections, local elections, by-elections, petitions, referendums, and plebiscites in the Canadian province of British Columbia. Its federal equivalent is Elections Canada.

== Responsibilities ==
Elections BC is a non-partisan office of the British Columbia Legislature responsible for conducting provincial elections, by-elections, petitions, referendums, and plebiscites in British Columbia. Elections BC compiles and maintains a list of eligible voters.

Elections BC is also responsible for regulating campaign financing and advertising and the registration of political parties. To retain their official status, political parties must file annual financial reports with Elections BC. Registration entitles parties to have their name on the ballot where they run candidates, issue tax receipts and spend on election campaigns. As of November 4, 2015, 22 political parties are registered in British Columbia.

In advance of elections, a district electoral officer (DEO) and a deputy district electoral officer (DDEO) represent Elections BC in each electoral district and establish a temporary office to conduct the election, often shortly before the writ of election is dropped by the government.

Elections BC is subject to the following legislation: Election Act (1996), Financial Disclosure Act (1996), Local Government Act (1996), the Local Elections Campaign Financing Act (2014)., and the Recall and Initiative Act (1996).

== Scheduled election dates ==
British Columbia was the first province to legislate fixed dates for elections. The next provincial election is set for October 24, 2026.

There have been instances where the province breaks from scheduled elections, most recently for the 2020 election, which was called by Premier John Horgan on September 21, 2020, and took place on October 24, 2020.

== Referendums ==
In 2015, Elections BC spent $5,372,380 to administer the 2015 Metro Vancouver Transportation and Transit Plebiscite, a cost of about $3.44 per voter. A total of 1,572,861 voting packages were issued and 798,262 (51 per cent) returned to Elections BC. About 62 per cent of Metro Vancouver voters rejected a proposal for a half-per-cent sales tax increase to fund a 10-year, $7.5-billion upgrade to transportation by TransLink. About 290,000 voted yes, while 467,000 voted no. About 38,393 ballot packages received by deadline were rejected because they did not meet the requirements of the plebiscite.

== Candidacy fees and requirements ==
A candidate is required under the Election Act to gather the signatures of 75 valid voters in their electoral district. A nomination deposit of $250 per candidate is required. Candidates who receive 15 per cent of the total vote receive a full refund. All others forfeit the deposit.

== Chief electoral officers ==
Upon being appointed as chief electoral officer, the person is required to forfeit their right to vote in elections they oversee. They may not be a member of a political party or contribute to candidate campaigns. There have been eight chief electoral officers of Elections BC (seven men and one woman).

List of chief electoral officers of British Columbia
Name	In office	
Frederick Harold Hurley	April 1, 1947	June 1, 1968
Kenneth Loudon Morton	June 1, 1968	October 1, 1979
Harry Morris Goldberg	April 15, 1980	May 2, 1990
Robert A. Patterson	May 2, 1990	June 6, 2002
Harry Neufeld	November 7, 2002	June 5, 2010
Keith Archer	September 21, 2011	May 1, 2018
Anton Boegman	June 1, 2018	November 7, 2025
Shipra Verma	November 12, 2025	present

== Election expenses ==
Election year	Total election expenses	Electoral division cost	CEO office cost	Voter registration cost	Electors on list	Average cost / elector	Turnout	Percentage	Sources
1996	$15,574,526	$8,891,749	$5,186,654	$1,496,123	2,227,424	$6.99	1,592,655	71.5%	
2001	$18,129,588	$11,607,098	$5,186,654	$1,615,849	2,254,920	$8.00	1,599,765	70.95%	
2005	$22,909,644	$13,624,872	$9,284,772	$3,244,918	2,845,284	$8.00	1,774,269	58.19%	
2009	$35,260,610	$21,170,173	$14,090,437	$2,912,687	3,238,737	$12.00	1,651,567	51%	
2013	$34,808,125	$22,874,036	$11,934,089	$5,982,981	3,116,626	$10.96	1,813,912	57.1%	
2017	$39,450,034	$22,407,049	$17,042,985	$6,272,500	3,246,647	$12.15	1,986,371	61.2%	
2020	$51,603,932	$29,400,057	$22,203,875	—N/a	3,524,812	$14.64	1,898,553	53.9%	
2024	$82,418,579	$35,074,231	$47,344,348	—N/a	3,609,288	$22.84	2,109,658	58.45%	

Note: Enumeration or voter registration expenses were included in total election expenses up to the 2001 election. As of 2005, Elections BC excluded enumeration expenses from its calculation of total election expenses.

=== Candidates per election ===
Election year	Total candidates	Electoral districts	Political parties	Registered constituency associations	Sources
1991	317	75	—N/a	—N/a	
1996	513	75	18	142	
2001	456	79	28	205	
2005	412	79	45	163	
2009	345	85	32	128	
2013	376	85	26	159	
2017	371	87	28	—N/a	
2020	332	87	28	—N/a	
2024	322	93	13	—N/a	
