= Harry Bloy =

Canadian politician (born 1946)

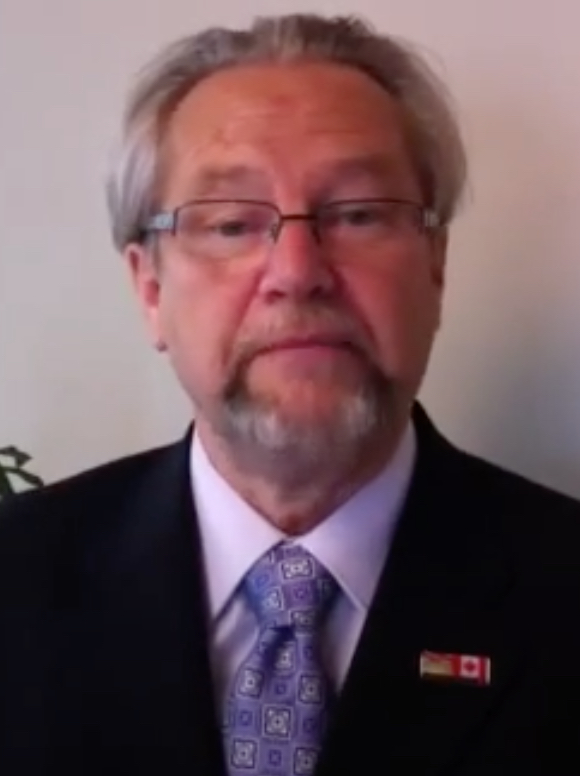

Member of the British Columbia Legislative Assembly for Burnaby-Lougheed Burquitlam (2001-2009)
- In office May 16, 2001 – May 14, 2013
- Preceded by: Riding Established
- Succeeded by: Jane Shin

Personal details
- Born: April 19, 1946 (age 80) Sudbury, Ontario
- Party: Liberal
- Education: Ryerson Polytechnic University

James Henry "Harry" Bloy (born April 19, 1946) is a retired Canadian politician from British Columbia. He was a BC Liberal member of the Legislative Assembly of British Columbia from 2001 to 2013, representing Burquitlam (2001–2009) and later Burnaby Lougheed (2009–2013). Bloy was notably the only BC Liberal MLA to support Christy Clark's successful candidacy for party leadership in 2011. He did not run for reelection in 2013.

== Early life and education ==
Bloy was born on April 19, 1946, in Sudbury, Ontario. He received a marketing diploma from Ryerson Polytechnic University.

== Political career ==
Bloy was an unsuccessful candidate for the Progressive Conservative Party in the 1983 provincial election in the riding of Burnaby North. He was first elected to the Legislative Assembly of British Columbia in the 2001 election for Burquitlam. He was reelected by a margin of 372 votes in 2005. In 2009, he was elected to represent the newly created Burnaby-Loughseed riding, defeating NDP candidate by Jaynie Clark by 696 votes, a margin of 48 to 45%.

=== Ministerial tenure and controversies ===
In 2011, Bloy was the only member of the Liberal caucus to endorse Christy Clark's successful candidacy for leader of the BC Liberals. When Clark became premier in March 2011, Bloy was appointed to his first cabinet position as Minister of Social Development. Bloy received scrutiny in this role over his relationship with the press, as well as criticism from BC New Democratic Party politicians over disability assistance funding. Criticism of Bloy as Minister of Social Development centered on a controversy surrounding the closure of group homes for developmentally disabled adults.

Bloy was demoted 6 months later by Clark to the position of Minister of State for Multiculturalism, a more junior position in the provincial government. During this appointment, Liberal party members and public servants began work on what resulted in the 2013 Quick Wins ethnic outreach scandal. Bloy announced his resignation from cabinet in March 2012 after admitting he leaked, to a private company, an email the government had received from a newspaper. It was subsequently revealed that Bloy would not run for re-election in the 2013 provincial election.
