= List of political parties in British Columbia =

Prior to 1903, there was no strong party discipline in the province, and governments rarely lasted more than two years as independent-minded members changed allegiances. MLAs were elected under a myriad of party labels many as Independents, and no one party held strong majorities. The first party government, in 1903, was Conservative; disciplined party caucuses have been the backbone of BC provincial politics ever since. A list of political parties currently registered with Elections BC, the non-partisan office responsible for conducting elections in the province, can be found on the Elections BC website.

== Parties represented in the current Legislative Assembly ==
| Party | Founded | Ideology | Leader | Membership | MLAs | In legislature | In government |
|---|---|---|---|---|---|---|---|
| Conservative Party (Note: Known as the Progressive Conservative Party from 1942 to 1991) | 1903 | Conservatism, (Canadian) | Lorne Doerkson (interim) | 41,718 (2026) | 64 / 93 | 1903–1933, 1937–1956, 1971–1979, 1986, 2012, 2023–present | 1903–1916, 1928–1933, 1941–1952, 2026–present |
| New Democratic Party (Note: Known as the Co-operative Commonwealth Federation until 1961) | 1933 | Social democracy | Jennifer Whiteside (interim) | ~11,000 (2022) | 27 / 93 | 1933–present | 1972–1975, 1991–2001, 2017–2026 |
| Green Party | 1985 | Green politics | Emily Lowan | 8,641 (2025) | 2 / 93 | 2013–present | |

== Current parties outside the legislature ==
Political parties currently registered to Elections BC as of October 28, 2026.

| Name | Founded | Ideology | Leader | Membership | In Legislature |
|---|---|---|---|---|---|
| British Columbia Party | 2026 | | Vacant | | |
| CanWest Party | 2026 | | Wei Ping Chen | | |
| CentreBC | 2025 | Centre-right politics, conservative liberalism | Mike Bernier | | 2026 (September–October) |
| Christian Heritage Party of British Columbia | 2010 | Christian right, constitutionalism, social conservatism | Christian McCay | | |
| Communist Party of British Columbia (Note: Known as the Labor-Progressive Party from 1943 until 1959) | 1924 | Communism, Marxism-Leninism | Robert Crooks | | |
| Freedom Party of British Columbia | 2023 | Social conservatism | Amrit Birring | | |
| British Columbia Libertarian Party | 1986 | Libertarianism | Alex Joehl | 100 (2016) | |
| Party of Citizens Who Have Decided To Think For Ourselves & Be Our Own Politicians | 2001 election (original); 2023 (relaunch) | | Gordon Watson | | |
| B.C. Vision | 2013 | Fiscal conservatism, green politics | Jagmohan Bhandari | | |
| OneBC | 2025 | Right-wing populism, social conservatism | Dallas Brodie (interim) | | 2025–2026 |

== Historical parties that have formed governments ==
| Name | Founded | Ideology | In legislature | In Government |
|---|---|---|---|---|
| British Columbia Liberal Party (Note: Known as the BC United after 2023) | 1903 | Conservatism, neoliberalism | 1903–1912, 1916–1975, 1991–2024 | 1916–1928, 1933–1952, 2001–2017 |
| British Columbia Social Credit Party | 1935 | Social credit, conservatism, right-wing populism | 1952–1996 | 1952–1972, 1975–1991 |

== Historical parties that have been represented in the legislature ==
| Name | Founded | Ideology | In Legislature |
|---|---|---|---|
| Labour/Independent Labour/Federated Labour | N/A | Social democracy | 1903–1907, 1920–1924, 1928–1960 |
| Socialist Party of British Columbia | 1901 | Socialism, impossiblism | 1905–1916 |
| Social Democratic Party of British Columbia | 1907 | Social democracy | 1912–1916 |
| People's Party of British Columbia | N/A | Populism | 1920–1924 |
| Provincial Party of British Columbia | 1923 | Agrarianism | 1924–1928 |
| Non-Partisan Independent Group | 1933 | Conservatism | 1933–1937 |
| Unionist Party of British Columbia | 1933 | Conservatism | 1933–1937 |
| British Columbia Social Constructive Party | 1936 | Reformism, social democracy | 1936–1937 |
| United Party of British Columbia | | | 1986 |
| Progressive Democratic Alliance | 1993 | Centrism | 1993–1997 |
| Reform Party of British Columbia | 1983 | Right-wing populism | 1994–1997 |
| Democratic Reform British Columbia | 2005 | Centrism, progressivism, populism | 2005 |

== Historical parties that never had seats in the legislature ==
- 4BC (2017 election)
- Action Party (2001–2003, 2013–2024)
- Advocational International Democratic Party of British Columbia (2006–2014)
- All Nations Party of British Columbia (2001 election–2005)
- Allegiance Party
- Alternative Party of British Columbia (?–2005)
- Annexation Party of British Columbia (2003–2009)
- BC Cascadia Party (2016–2024)
- BC Ecosocialists
- BC First Party (2010–2018)
- BC Independence Party (2021–2024)
- BC Strong (2025)
- British Columbia Party
- Canadian Alliance Party of British Columbia (?–2005)
- Central Party (2001 election)
- Centre Democratic Party (2000–2005)
- Christian Democratic Party (1952 and 1953 elections)
- Citizens Action Party (BC Grey Party) (2002–2009)
- Citizens First Party (2017)
- Citizens Alliance Now (?–2007) (2001 election)
- Citizens Commonwealth Federation (2001 election)
- Common Sense, Community, Family Party (1996 election)
- Council of British Columbians (2001 election)
- Confederation Party of British Columbia (2003–2009)
- Constructive Party (1937 election)
- British Columbia Cultural Action Party
- Democratic Alliance (2004–2005)
- Democratic Futures Party (2003–2009)
- Democratic Idealists Party (2002)
- British Columbia Direct Democracy Party (2020–2024)
- Emancipation Party (1941 election)
- Emerged Democracy Party of British Columbia (2004–2009) (2005 election)
- Enterprise Party of British Columbia
- Excalibur Party
- Family Coalition Party of British Columbia (1991 and 1996 elections)
- Feminist Initiative of BC (2005–2008)
- For British Columbia (4BC)
- Free Canadian Party (2003–2008)
- Freedom Party of British Columbia (2001–2009) (2001 and 2005 elections)
- Gay Alliance Toward Equality (1979 election)
- Green Go (Green Wing / Rhino) (1991 election)
- Helping Hand Party (2011–2013)
- Human Race Party (1991 election)
- Idealists Party (2003–2008)
- Independent New Hope Party (1979 election)
- Individual Rights Party of British Columbia (2011–2013)
- Financial Justice Party (1937 election)
- Labour Party (2004–2009)
- Labour Representation Committee (1952 election)
- Land Air Water Party (2015–2018) (2017 election)
- League for Socialist Action (1975 election)
- Link BC (2002–2009)
- Marijuana Party (2000–2019) (2001, 2005, 2009, and 2013 elections)
- Millionaires Party (2002–2008)
- Moderate Democratic Movement (2003–2008) (2005 election)
- Nation Alliance Party (2007–2012) (2009 election)
- Natural Law Party of British Columbia (199?–2005)
- New Republican Party (2017–2019) (2017 election)
- New Wave Party (2011–2015)
- North American Labour Party (1975 and 1979 elections)
- Patriot Party (2001–2013)
- People's Co-operative Commonwealth Federation (1945 election)
- People's Front (Marxist–Leninist) (1986 election – 2017)
- People's Party (1945, 1953 and 1956 elections)
- Planting Seeds Party (2006–2008)
- Platinum Party of Employers Who Think and Act to Increase Awareness
- ProBC
- Progressive Nationalist Party (Bloc BC Party) (2004–2013)
- Refederation Party (formerly Western Refederation Party; Western Independence Party)
- Religious Political Brotherhood (1941 election)
- Renewal Party of British Columbia (2004–2008)
- Revolutionary Marxist Group (1975 election)
- Rural BC Party (2018–2023)
- Revolutionary Workers Party 1945–1953
- The Sex Party (2005–2012) (2005 and 2009 elections)
- Social Conservative Party (1969 election)
- Socialist Labour Party
- United Front (1933 election)
- United Peoples Action Party (2003–2006)
- Unparty: The Consensus-Building Party (formerly the People's Senate Party)
- Vancouver Island Party (2016–2020)
- Victory Without Debt Party (1941 election)
- Western Canada Concept Party of British Columbia (1980–2013)
- Western Independence Party (1979 election)
- Western National Party (1983 election)
- Western Reform (2001 election)
- Wexit BC (2019–2022)
- Work Less Party of British Columbia (2003–2017)
- Unity Party (2001–2008) (2001 & 2005 election)
- Your Political Party of British Columbia (2002–2024)
- Youth Coalition (2000–2009)

== See also ==
- Municipal political parties in Vancouver
