= Grant Mitton (politician) =

Grant Mitton (born 1941) is a former radio talk show host on CJDC (AM) Radio's open line program and political leader in British Columbia, Canada. On March 7, 2001, he was appointed a vice president of the Reform Party of British Columbia, and he was a candidate of the British Columbia Social Credit Party in the 2001 provincial election in Peace River South, placing second with 1,726 votes, 17.33% of the total. He became leader of the Social Credit Party, but then left it to join the British Columbia Party as a "traditional conservative party", hoping to attract support from conservatives, particularly social conservatives dissatisfied with the policies of the ruling British Columbia Liberal Party. He led the party during the 2005 election. The party nominated only two candidates who won 362 votes. Mitton did not run in the election. He subsequently left the BC Party, and joined the British Columbia Conservative Party.
