= British Columbia Social Credit Party =

Provincial political party in Canada

- Founded: 1935
- Dissolved: 2023
- Headquarters: Unit 101 – 8091 Granville Avenue, Richmond, BC, V6Y 1P5
- Ideology: 1950s: Social credit; 1950s–1970s: Right-wing populism; After 1970s: Conservatism
- Political position: Centre-right to right-wing
- National affiliation: Social Credit Party of Canada (until 1971)
- Colours: Blue and red

The British Columbia Social Credit Party was a conservative political party in British Columbia, Canada. It was the governing party of British Columbia for all but three years between the 1952 provincial election and the 1991 election. For four decades, the party dominated the British Columbian political scene, with the only break occurring between the 1972 and 1975 elections when the British Columbia New Democratic Party governed. Party members were known as Socreds.

Although founded as part of the Canadian social credit movement, promoting social credit policies of monetary reform, the BC Social Credit Party later discarded the ideology and became a political vehicle for fiscal conservatives and later social conservatives in British Columbia.

The party collapsed within one term of its 1991 defeat. It was not represented in the Legislative Assembly of British Columbia after 1996, and only existed in a nominal fashion after 2001. In 2013, the party was deregistered for failing to nominate more than two candidates in two consecutive provincial elections. The party re-registered in June 2016 to participate in the 2017 election, but only nominated the minimum of two candidates. It did not nominate any candidates in the 2020 election, and was again deregistered as a party on February 1, 2023.

Former Canadian prime minister Kim Campbell started her political career in the BC Social Credit Party.

== History ==
=== Pre-1952 ===
Prior to 1952, the social credit movement in British Columbia was divided between various factions. The Social Credit League of British Columbia nominated candidates for the first time in the 1937 election, but did not do so in the 1941 election.

In the 1945 election, these factions formed an alliance to field 16 candidates, who won a total of 6,627 votes (1.42% of the provincial total).

This alliance broke down before the 1949 election, and three separate groups nominated candidates:

- the Social Credit Party,
- the British Columbia Social Credit League, and
- the Union of Electors.

Collectively, they nominated 28 candidates, who won a total of 14,326 votes, 2.05% of the popular vote in that election.

=== W. A. C. Bennett era ===
For the 1952 provincial election, the coalition government between the British Columbia Liberal Party and British Columbia Conservative Party reformed the electoral system from first past the post to the alternative vote. The coalition was nervous about the growing popularity of the Co-operative Commonwealth Federation (CCF), the forerunner of the NDP. With the expectation that Conservative voters would list the Liberals as their second choice and vice versa, the two parties believed they'd garner enough votes between them to stay in power.

Meanwhile, the Social Credit League went into the election under the interim leadership of the Reverend Ernest George Hansell, Member of the federal Parliament for the Alberta riding of Macleod since 1935. Hansell was hand-picked by Alberta premier Ernest Manning, as the Alberta Social Credit Party still dominated their BC sister. However, much to the BC Socreds' own surprise, the party received 200,000 more votes than in the previous election and garnered enough vote transfers to become the largest party in the legislature. It took 19 seats, one more than the CCF, while the Liberals and Conservatives were practically wiped out. The Socreds persuaded an independent Labour Member of the Legislative Assembly (MLA) to support them, allowing them to form a minority government.

As not even the Socreds expected to win the election, they now found themselves with the task of electing a leader who would become the province's new Premier. Party president Lyle Wicks called a leadership convention at which only elected MLAs could vote. The 19 newly elected Social Credit MLAs chose former BC Conservative MLA W. A. C. Bennett, one of only three Socreds with previous experience in the legislature, to lead the new government over Philip Gaglardi. Bennett had joined the Socreds only in December, doing so with the tacit support of the federal Conservative caucus. The federal Conservatives were displeased that their provincial counterparts had sat out the previous two elections so as not to embarrass their Liberal partners. Nine months into the new term, Bennett deliberately lost a confidence vote in order to force a snap general election in 1953. At this election, Social Credit won an outright majority.

Although the party was ostensibly the British Columbia wing of the Canadian social credit movement, Bennett jettisoned the old ideology, remembering that the Alberta Socreds had tried and failed to implement it soon after winning their first term in government. Instead, he converted it into a populist conservative party. It became a political vehicle to unite opponents of the CCF in hopes of shutting it out of power.

The BC Social Credit Party drifted away from both social credit theories and from the federal Social Credit Party as many supporters of the federal Liberals and Conservatives joined it. While Bennett made sporadic appearances for the federal Socreds, their relationship was tenuous at best. Finally, in 1971, the BC Socreds formally severed their ties to the federal Socreds in order to make it easier for staunch Tories and Liberals to support it at the provincial level.

Despite being a free market party, the Bennett government formed BC Hydro in 1961 by nationalizing the province's largest private hydroelectric concern to make sure that it could not oppose the government's hydroelectric dam construction program. It also formed BC Ferries in 1958, and established the Bank of British Columbia, which was 25% owned by the provincial government.

The Social Credit Party would win five more terms in government, each time with fairly large majorities. However, this streak ended in 1972 amid a gaffe-prone campaign. For instance, Gagliardi suggested that Bennett would stand down after the election, accusing him of being out of touch with "the young people of this province." This led to questions about whether the party had become tired and complacent after 20 years in power. Nonetheless, it came as a shock when Social Credit was heavily defeated by the British Columbia New Democratic Party (BC NDP) under Dave Barrett, falling to only 10 seats.

=== Bill Bennett era ===
W. A. C. Bennett's son, Bill Bennett, took over the leadership of the party in 1973. The younger Bennett modernized the party and abandoned populism. Instead, the party became a coalition of federal Liberals, Christian conservatives from the province's Bible Belt, and fiscal conservatives from the corporate sector with the latter firmly in control.

Bill Bennett led the Socreds back to power at the 1975 election, mainly by dominating the province outside of Vancouver. The younger Bennett, for the most part, eschewed the megaprojects of the elder Bennett (with the exception of Expo 86 and the Coquihalla Highway), and embraced a fiscally conservative program.

As a result, the party built up a small political engine that managed to win two more terms in 1979 and 1983 general elections, in spite of Bennett's controversial "Restraint" program. This was nicknamed the "Baby Blue Machine", and consisted of political advisors primarily imported from the Ontario Progressive Conservative Party. It never became a major political apparatus like the Big Blue Machine in Ontario did, as Bennett decided to retire in 1986.

All Socred governments attempted to curb the power of trade unions and also limited social welfare spending.

=== Bill Vander Zalm era ===
Bennett retired in 1986 and was succeeded by Bill Vander Zalm. Under his watch, social conservatives took control of the party; Vander Zalm himself was a member of the social conservative wing. Vander Zalm easily led the Socreds to a fourth consecutive term in government in the election later that year.

Although it was not apparent at the time, the downfall of the party began almost as soon as Vander Zalm took the premiership. Many moderate Socreds were dissatisfied at the party's social conservative turn. They began drifting to the Liberals, a trend that would come back to haunt the party later. This process was exacerbated by Vander Zalm's eccentricity, and the constant scandals that plagued his government. Also, Vander Zalm allowed his principal secretary, David Poole, to amass a substantial amount of power, despite his being unelected. Longtime cabinet minister Grace McCarthy resigned in protest.

=== Decline ===
Vander Zalm was forced to resign in a conflict of interest scandal in 1991, and was succeeded as party leader and premier by Deputy Premier Rita Johnston, who became the first female head of government at the provincial or federal level in Canada. Johnston then defeated McCarthy in the subsequent leadership election and continued as premier. Johnston had been close to Vander Zalm for several years, leading many to believe her selection as leader had been a mistake. Even BC NDP opposition leader Mike Harcourt admitted later that he preferred Johnston over McCarthy, as McCarthy would likely have been a much tougher opponent in an election.

Facing a statutory general election in 1991, Johnston was unable to make up any ground. She also had little time to reunite the party following the bruising leadership contest with McCarthy. Social Credit was roundly defeated, losing almost half of its vote from 1986. Johnston herself lost her own seat to BC NDP challenger Penny Priddy. Furthermore, many moderate Socred supporters defected to the British Columbia Liberal Party, continuing a trend that dated back to Vander Zalm's tenure. The BC Liberals vaulted from no seats in the legislature to the Official Opposition. The combined effect was to decimate the Socreds, who plunged from a strong majority government to third place with only seven seats–including only five surviving members from Johnston's cabinet. More party infighting occurred as McCarthy was elected to replace Johnston. McCarthy didn't get a chance to get into the legislature until February 1994, when she ran in a by-election for Matsqui, a longtime Socred stronghold. She lost to Liberal Mike de Jong by fewer than 100 votes.

After McCarthy's by-election loss, Social Credit collapsed with dramatic speed. Four of the seven Social Credit MLAs elected in 1991 left the party to join the British Columbia Reform Party, leaving Social Credit without official status in the legislature. McCarthy resigned as leader shortly thereafter, and Larry Gillanders was elected to succeed her. After that, Abbotsford MLA Harry de Jong resigned (and briefly contemplated taking up the leadership of the Family Coalition Party). The BC Liberals took the riding in the ensuing by-election, with Social Credit in a distant third. This left only one Socred in the legislature: Cliff Serwa from Okanagan West, which contained much of the Bennetts' former territory.

Social Credit went into the 1996 provincial election in an extremely precarious position. It had been unable to get its leader into the legislature at any point during the previous session. Even worse, Serwa had announced his retirement, leaving it without any incumbents for the first time since 1952. Gillanders took part in the leaders' debate, but pulled out of the campaign just before the vote and urged all non-socialist parties to present a united front against the BC NDP. The Social Credit Party was completely shut out of the legislature, garnering only 0.6 percent of the vote. At this point, the party was largely considered a dead force in BC politics, with most of its remaining members joining Reform or the Liberals. The collapse of the British Columbia Socreds within only one term of losing power was especially remarkable considering their Alberta counterparts managed to maintain at least a nominal presence in the legislature for a decade after their defeat in 1971.

In 2001, at the behest of former leader Vander Zalm–now leader of Reform BC–the Social Credit Party merged with other minor provincial right-wing parties to form the Unity Party, but soon left due to dissatisfaction with the way the party was run.

In the 2001 provincial election, what remained of the party ran only two candidates. Grant Mitton achieved a respectable showing in Peace River South, placing second with 1,726 votes (17.4%). The other candidate, party president Carrol Barbara Woolsey, in Vancouver-Hastings, placed fifth of six candidates with 222 votes (1.15% of the total). The party hadn't had a full-time leader since 2000; Mitton was the de facto leader during the campaign. Mitton left to become leader of the British Columbia Party, leaving Woolsey as de facto party leader.

In the 2005 election, only two Socreds filed: Woolsey, who won 254 votes (1.28% of the total) in Vancouver-Hastings, and Anthony Yao, who won 225 votes (0.95% of the total) in Port Coquitlam-Burke Mountain.

The party did not field any candidates in the 2009 general election. In the 2013 election, Woolsey was the only Socred candidate, again in Vancouver-Hastings, receiving 355 votes. Since British Columbia election law mandates de-registration of parties that run fewer than two candidates in two consecutive elections, the party was deregistered by Election BC on June 7, 2013. However, it had existed in name only since at least 2001. In addition to nominating few or no candidates at all in recent years, its website had been updated only sporadically since 2005, and hadn't been updated at all since February 2012. Most of its constituency associations had been de-registered in 2008.

The Social Credit Party nominated two candidates in the 2017 provincial election. Neither were elected, and they only tallied 896 votes between them. It did not field any candidates in the 2020 British Columbia general election and was deregistered in 2023.

== Party leaders ==
- Andrew Henry Jukes, 1937–48, leader of the Union of Electors faction, 1948–49.
- No leader as such of the Social Credit Party/Social Credit League emerged until the 1952 election. However, Eric Martin and Lyle Wicks were the most obvious figures of a collective leadership. At the 1952, party convention Wicks, W.A.C. Bennett and Rev. Hansell were nominated for the party leadership. Wicks and Bennett withdrew in favour of Hansell who was the hand-picked choice of Alberta Social Credit leader and Premier Ernest Manning. Following the election, Wicks, who was party president, called a second leadership convention at which only Social Credit MLAs could vote. This was won by Bennett.
- Reverend Ernest George Hansell, M.P. for Macleod (Alberta), leader for the 1952 election.
- W. A. C. Bennett (July 15, 1952 – November 24, 1973) *
- Bill Bennett (November 24, 1973 – July 30, 1986) *
- Bill Vander Zalm (July 30, 1986 – April 1, 1991) *
- Rita Johnston (April 2, 1991 – March 7, 1992) *
- Jack Weisgerber (interim) (March 7, 1992 – November 6, 1993)
- Grace McCarthy (November 6, 1993 – May 1994)
- Lyall Franklin Hanson (interim) (May 1994)
- Cliff Serwa (interim) (May – November 1994)
- Larry Gillanders (November 4, 1994 – May 24, 1996)
- Ken Endean (interim) (May 1996 – March 1997)
- Mike Culos (April 1997 – April 2000)
- Eric Buckley (April 2000 – October 2000)

Eric Buckley left Social Credit in October 2000 to join the British Columbia Party. The party did not have an official leader after that.

== Other prominent Socred politicians ==
- Kim Campbell
- Garde Gardom
- Pat McGeer
- Rafe Mair
- Phil Gaglardi
- Tom Northcott, a prominent singer, stood unsuccessfully for the provincial legislature.

== Electoral results ==
In the 1937 election, the British Columbia Social Credit League endorsed candidates, but none were elected.

1937 election
Number of candidates	Seats	Popular vote	%
18	0	4,812	1.15%

In the 1941 election, no candidates ran under the social credit banner.

In the 1945 election, an alliance of social credit groups nominated candidates. None were elected.

1945 election
Number of candidates	Seats	Popular vote	%
16	0	6,627	1.42%

In the 1949 election, three different social credit groups nominated candidates. None were successful.

1949 election
Name of party	Number of candidates	Seats	Popular vote	%
Social Credit Party	7	0	8,464	1.21%
Social Credit League	9	0	3,072	0.44%
Union of Electors	12	0	2,790	0.40%
Total of social credit groups	28	0	14,326	2.05%

In subsequent elections, the Social Credit Party of British Columbia emerged as the only social credit party; however, it quickly abandoned social credit theories.

Election	Leader	Candidates	Seats			Votes			Final round 1952–53 only		Legislative role	Notes
Election	Leader	Candidates	Previous	After	% Change	Number	%	Change	Votes	%	Legislative role	Notes
1952	Rev. Ernest George Hansell	47	0	19 / 48	–	209,049	27.20%	+25.99%	203,932	30.18%	Minority	
1953	W.A.C. Bennett	48	19	28 / 48	–	274,771	37.75%	+10.55%	300,372	45.54%	Majority	
1956	W.A.C. Bennett	52	28	39 / 52	39.3%	374,711	45.84%	+8.09%			Majority	
1960	W.A.C. Bennett	52	39	32 / 52	-17.9%	386,886	38.83%	-7.01%			Majority	
1963	W.A.C. Bennett	52	32	33 / 52	+3.1%	395,079	40.83%	+2.00%			Majority	
1966	W.A.C. Bennett	55	33	33 / 55	-	342,751	45.59%	+4.76%			Majority	
1969	W.A.C. Bennett	55	33	38 / 55	+15.2%	457,777	46.79%	+1.20%			Majority	
1972	W.A.C. Bennett	55	38	10 / 55	-73.7%	352,776	31.16%	-15.63%			Opposition	NDP majority
1975	Bill Bennett	55	10	35 / 55	+250%	635,482	49.25%	+18.09%			Majority	
1979	Bill Bennett	57	35	31 / 55	-11.4%	677,607	48.23%	-1.02%			Majority	
1983	Bill Bennett	57	31	35 / 57	+12.9%	820,807	49.76%	+1.53%			Majority	
1986	Bill Vander Zalm	69	35	47 / 69	+34.3%	954,516	49.32%	-0.44%			Majority	
1991	Rita Johnston	74	47	7 / 75	-85.1%	351,660	24.05%	-25.27%			Third party	NDP majority
1996	Larry Gillanders	38	7	0 / 75	-100%	6,276	0.40%	-23.65%			No seats	NDP majority
2001	(vacant)	2	–	0 / 79	–	1,948	0.12%	-0.27%			No seats	Liberal majority
2005	(vacant)	2	–	0 / 79	–	479	0.02%	-0.10%			No seats	Liberal majority
2009	Did not contest											Liberal majority
2013	(vacant)	1	–	0 / 85	–	384	0.02%	0.00%			No seats	Liberal majority
2017	(vacant)	2	–	0 / 87	–	853	0.05%	+0.03%			No seats	Liberal minority
2017	(vacant)	2	–	0 / 87	–	853	0.05%	+0.03%			No seats	NDP minority with Green Party confidence and supply

== See also ==
- British Columbia Conservative Party
- British Columbia Liberal Party
- British Columbia Social Credit Party leadership elections
- Canadian social credit movement
- List of British Columbia general elections
- List of British Columbia political parties
- Social Credit
