= 2001 British Columbia general election =

Canadian provincial election

- May 16, 2001

79 seats of the Legislative Assembly of British Columbia 40 seats were needed for a majority
- Turnout: 55.44% ▼3.67 pp
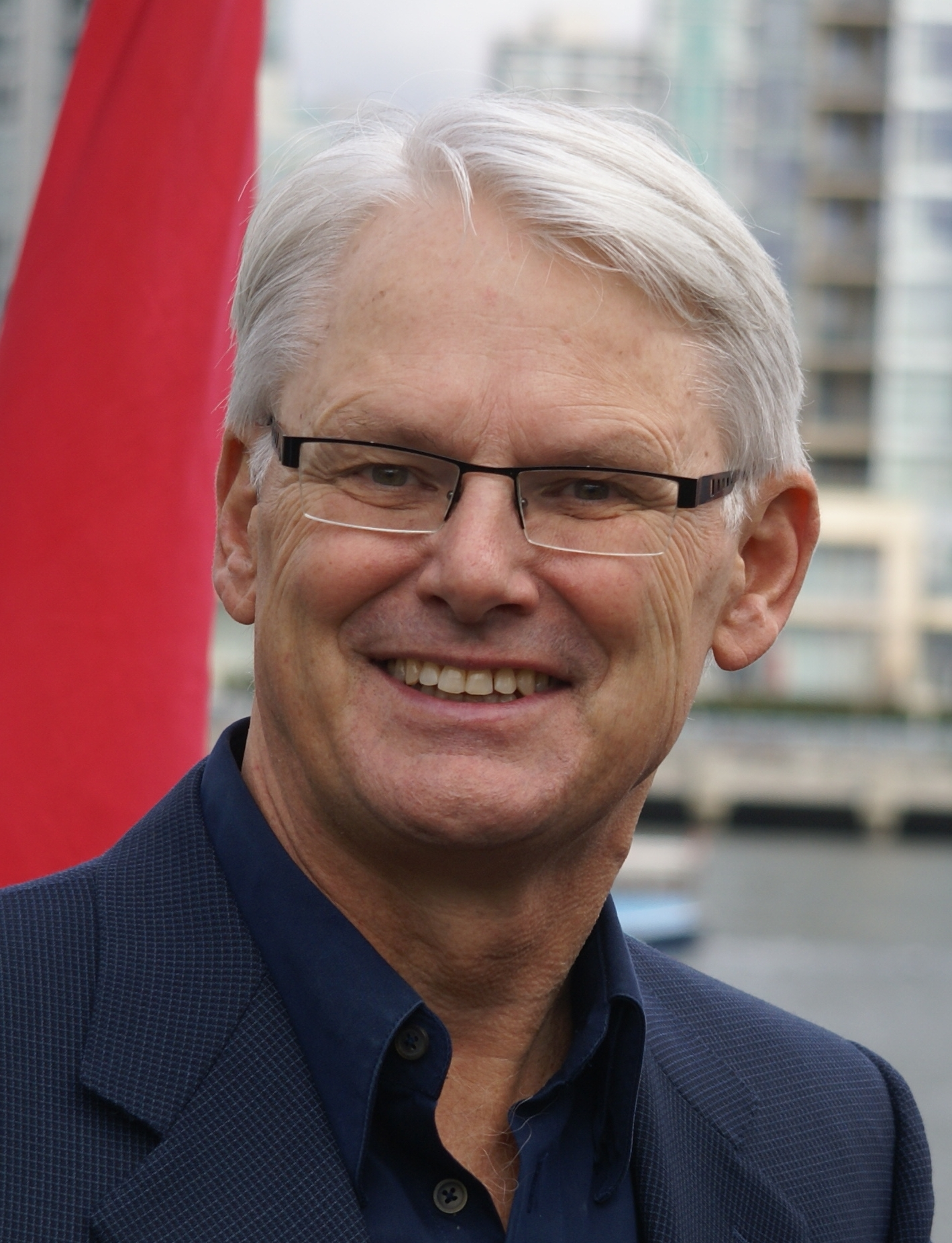

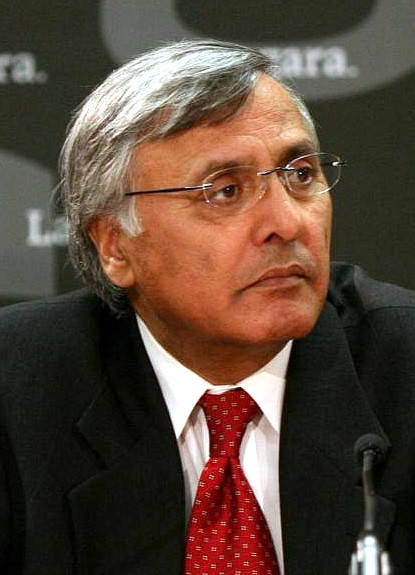

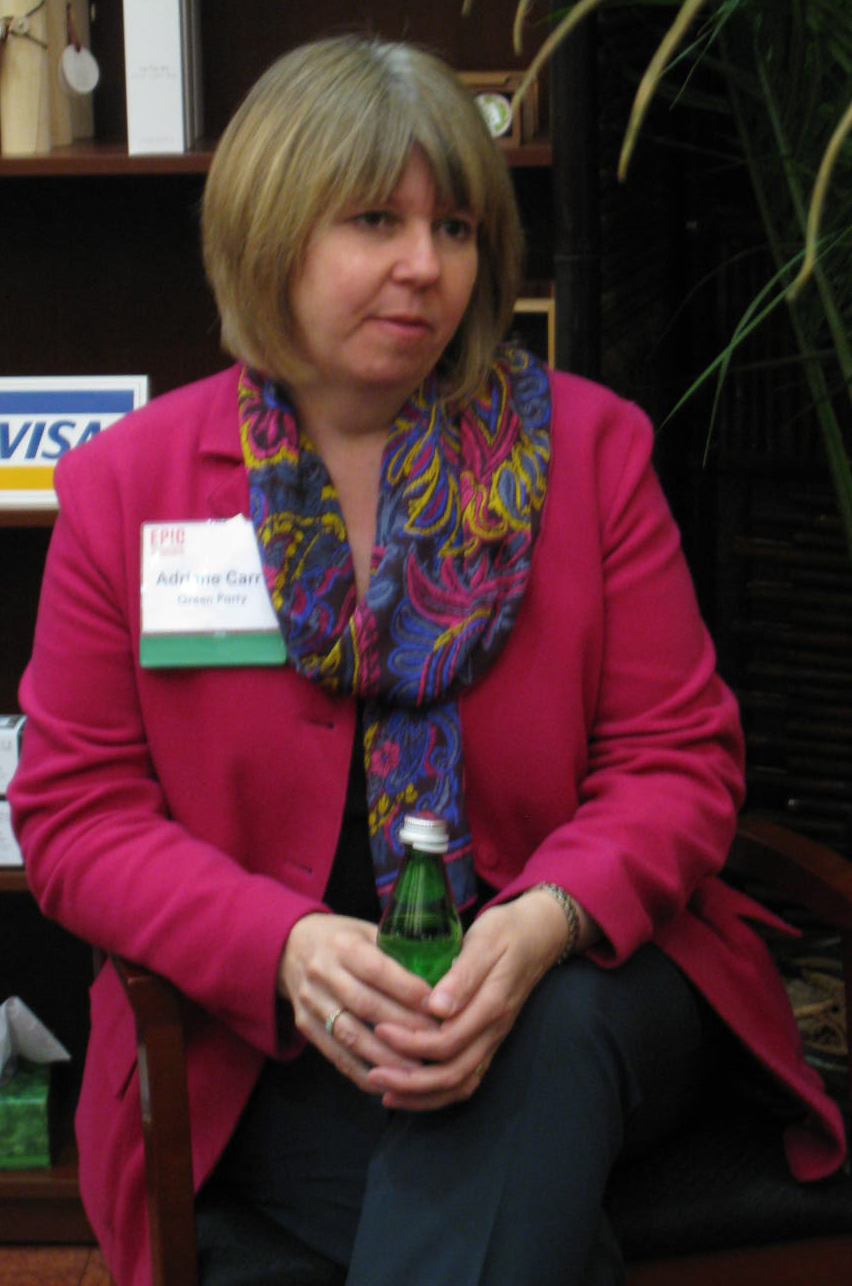
	First party	Second party	Third party
Leader	Gordon Campbell	Ujjal Dosanjh	Adriane Carr
Party	Liberal	New Democratic	Green
Leader since	September 11, 1993	February 20, 2000	September 23, 2000
Leader's seat	Vancouver-Point Grey	Vancouver-Kensington (lost re-election)	Ran in Powell River-Sunshine Coast (lost)
Last election	33 seats	39 seats	0 seats
Seats won	77	2	0
Seat change	▲44	▼37	Steady
Popular vote	916,888	343,156	197,231
Percentage	57.62%	21.56%	12.39%
Swing	▲15.80%	▼17.89%	▲10.40%
- Popular vote by riding. As this is an FPTP election, seat totals are not determined by popular vote, but instead via results by each riding. Click the map for more details.
Premier before election
Ujjal Dosanjh
New Democratic
Premier after election
Gordon Campbell
Liberal

The 2001 British Columbia general election was the 37th provincial election in the Province of British Columbia, Canada. It was held to elect members of the Legislative Assembly of British Columbia. The election was called on April 18, 2001 and held on May 16, 2001. Voter turnout was 55.4 per cent of all eligible voters.

The incumbent British Columbia New Democratic Party (BC NDP), in office since 1991, had been rocked by two major scandals—the Fast Ferries Scandal and a bribery scandal involving Premier Glen Clark. With the NDP's ratings flatlining, Clark resigned in August 1999, and Deputy Premier Dan Miller took over as caretaker premier until Ujjal Dosanjh was elected his permanent successor in February. Dosanjh was not, however, able to restore the party's public image, and the BC NDP suffered a resounding defeat at the hands of the British Columbia Liberal Party (BC Liberals), led by former Vancouver mayor Gordon Campbell. The BC Liberals won over 57% of the popular vote, and an unprecedented 77 of the 79 seats in the provincial legislature—the largest victory in the province's electoral history.

The BC NDP, on the other hand, suffered a near-total political collapse. The party lost almost half of the share of the popular vote that it had won in the 1996 election, while its seat count fell from 39 seats to only 2—those of Deputy Premier and Minister of Education Joy MacPhail and Minister of Community Development Jenny Kwan, both elected in Vancouver ridings. It was the worst defeat of a sitting government in British Columbia history. It was also the fourth worst defeat of a sitting provincial government in Canada, eclipsed only by the 1987 New Brunswick election, the 1935 Alberta election, and the 1935 Prince Edward Island election. In each of those elections, the governing party–the New Brunswick Tories, the United Farmers of Alberta and the PEI Tories–won no seats. Dosanjh resigned as party leader soon after the election; he had actually conceded defeat a week before voters went to the polls. Despite being the only other party in the assembly, the BC NDP lacked the four seats then required for official party status.

== 2000 redistribution of ridings ==
An Act was passed in 2000 providing for an increase of seats from 75 to 79, upon the next election. The following changes were made:

Abolished ridings	New ridings
Renaming of districts
Kootenay	East Kootenay
Mission-Kent	Maple Ridge-Mission (Note: With part of Maple Ridge-Pitt Meadows)
Matsqui	Abbotsford-Mount Lehman
Okanagan East	Kelowna-Lake Country
Okanagan-Penticton	Penticton-Okanagan Valley (Note: With part of Okanagan-Boundary)
Okanagan West	Kelowna-Mission
Vancouver-Little Mountain (Note: Parts also went to Vancouver-Fraserview, Vancouver-Mount Pleasant and Vancouver-Langara)	Vancouver-Fairview
Drawn from other districts
	Okanagan-Westside (Note: From parts of Okanagan West, Okanagan-Vernon and Okanagan-Penticton)
	Surrey-Panorama Ridge (Note: From parts of Surrey-Newton and Surrey-Cloverdale)
	Surrey-Tynehead (Note: From parts of Surrey-Cloverdale, Surrey-Whalley and Surrey-Green Timbers)
Merger of districts
Okanagan-Boundary; Rossland-Trail	West Kootenay-Boundary
Reorganization of districts
Abbotsford; Chilliwack	Abbotsford-Clayburn; Chilliwack-Kent; Chilliwack-Sumas
Alberni; Nanaimo; Parksville-Qualicum	Alberni-Qualicum; Nanaimo; Nanaimo-Parksville
Port Coquitlam; Port Moody-Burnaby Mountain	Burquitlam; Port Coquitlam-Burke Mountain; Port Moody-Westwood

== Opinion polls ==
=== During campaign period ===
Evolution of voting intentions at provincial level
Polling firm	Last day of survey	Source	BCLP	BCNDP	BCG	BCUP	BCMP	RPBC	Other	ME	Sample
Election 2001	May 16, 2001		57.62	21.56	12.39	3.23	3.22	0.22	1.76		
COMPAS	May 12, 2001		61	16	12	3	3	—N/a	—N/a	4.5	700
Ipsos-Reid	May 7, 2001		63	16	13	3	3	1	—N/a	3.5	800
MarkTrend	May 6, 2001		65	14	15	3	3	—N/a	—N/a	4.4	500
COMPAS	May 1, 2001		64	15	13	5	—N/a	—N/a	—N/a	4.5	500
Ipsos-Reid	April 23, 2001		70	16	10	2	1	—N/a	—N/a	3.5	800
McIntyre & Mustel	April 19, 2001		72	18	7	2	—N/a	—N/a	—N/a	4.1	610
Election called (April 18, 2001)

=== During 36th Legislative Assembly of British Columbia ===

Evolution of voting intentions at provincial level
Polling firm	Last day of survey	Source	BCLP	BCNDP	BCG	BCUP	BCMP	RPBC	Other	ME	Sample
COMPAS	April 1, 2001		66	17	7	3	2	2	—N/a	4.1	—N/a
Ipsos-Reid	March 12, 2001		63	20	7	7	—N/a	—N/a	3	3.5	800
McIntyre & Mustel	February 2001		59	20	5	—N/a	—N/a	12	—N/a	—N/a	—N/a
COMPAS	February 5, 2001		59	18	8	—N/a	—N/a	12	—N/a	3.5	800
McIntyre & Mustel	January 12, 2001		51	27	—N/a	—N/a	—N/a	—N/a	—N/a	5.0	—N/a
Ipsos-Reid	December 10, 2000		51	17	9	—N/a	—N/a	19	4	4.0	600
MarkTrend	November 2000		58	18	—N/a	—N/a	—N/a	22	—N/a	4.5	500
McIntyre & Mustel	October 21, 2000		67	17	—N/a	—N/a	—N/a	10	—N/a	4.5	500
MarkTrend	September 2000		55	19	—N/a	—N/a	—N/a	25	—N/a	4.5	500
Ipsos-Reid	September 11, 2000		48	19	8	—N/a	—N/a	22	3	4.0	600
McIntyre & Mustel	August 2000		53	21	—N/a	—N/a	—N/a	19	—N/a	—N/a	—N/a

Polling firm	Last day of survey	Source	BCLP	BCNDP	BCG	RPBC	PDA	Other	ME	Sample
PDA unregistered as official party (June 2000)
Ipsos-Reid	June 13, 2000		57	16	6	15	5	1	4.0	600
MarkTrend	April 2000		58	16	—N/a	21	—N/a	5	—N/a	503
Ipsos-Reid	March 2000		50	24	6	16	3	1	3.5	800
MarkTrend	February 2000		53	27	—N/a	17	—N/a	—N/a	—N/a	500
McIntyre & Mustel	February 27, 2000		52	25	5	15	—N/a	—N/a	4.3	511
Ujjal Dosanjh becomes leader of the NDP and premier (February 24, 2000)
Angus Reid	December 15, 1999		55	17	—N/a	18	—N/a	10	4.0	600
MarkTrend	October 1999		53	19	—N/a	22	—N/a	5	5.0	500
Angus Reid	September 10, 1999		57	15	—N/a	16	—N/a	11	4.0	620
Angus Reid	August 24, 1999		56	16	8	17	2	—N/a	4.1	601
MarkTrend	August 1999		61	15	—N/a	22	—N/a	—N/a	—N/a	—N/a
Premier Glen Clark resigns (August 21, 1999)
Angus Reid	June 8, 1998		58	16	3	14	3	2	4.1	600
MarkTrend	April 11, 1999		59	18	—N/a	20	—N/a	—N/a	4.0	501
Angus Reid	March 10, 1999		52	18	6	18	4	2	4.1	600
Angus Reid	December 1998		46	18	5	18	10	—N/a	—N/a	—N/a
Angus Reid	September 1998		46	18	—N/a	—N/a	—N/a	—N/a	—N/a	—N/a
Angus Reid	June 12, 1998		42	23	6	20	8	—N/a	4.1	610
McIntyre & Mustel	March 1998		48	25	—N/a	—N/a	—N/a	—N/a	—N/a	—N/a
Angus Reid	March 1998		47	20	—N/a	17	—N/a	—N/a	—N/a	—N/a
Angus Reid	December 12, 1997		43	24	5	18	8	—N/a	4	600
Pollara	December 1997		41	20	—N/a	31	—N/a	—N/a	—N/a	—N/a
Angus Reid	September 15, 1997		33	30	2	24	9	2	4.0	600
Angus Reid	June 16, 1997		34	27	3	28	6	2	4	600
Angus Reid	March 10, 1997		44	24	2	18	9	2	4.0	601
Angus Reid	December 1996		52	29	2	11	3	4	—N/a	—N/a
Angus Reid	September 15, 1996		45	37	1	12	3	3	4.0	600
Angus Reid	June 1996		39	42	2	9	6	3	—N/a	—N/a
Election 1996	May 28, 1996		41.82	39.45	1.99	9.27	5.74	1.73		

=== Region-specific polls ===
==== Southern Vancouver Island ====
Polling firm	Last day of survey	Source	BCLP	BCNDP	BCG	BCUP	ME	Sample
Compas	May 12, 2001		49	27	15	—N/a	7.0	200
Compas	May 2, 2001		59	15	13	5	3.2	500

=== Riding-specific polls ===
==== Vancouver-Kensington ====
Evolution of voting intentions at provincial level
Polling firm	Last day of survey	Source	BCLP	BCNDP	BCG	BCMP	BCUP	ME	Sample
Election 2001	May 16, 2001		47.56	38.82	9.32	2.68	1.62		
McIntyre & Mustel	May 1, 2001		53	31	10	2	3	5.6	301
COMPAS	May 1, 2001		52	29	14	—N/a	—N/a	7.1	200
Election 1996	May 28, 1996		40.65	50.74	1.89	—	—		

== Results ==
Party	Party leader	# of candidates	Seats			Popular vote		
Party	Party leader	# of candidates	1996	Elected	% Change	#	%	Change
Liberal	Gordon Campbell	79	33	77	+133.3%	916,888	57.62%	+15.80%
New Democrats	Ujjal Dosanjh	79	39	2	-94.9%	343,156	21.56%	-17.89%
Green	Adriane Carr	72	-	–	–	197,231	12.39%	+10.40%
Unity	Chris Delaney	56	–	–	–	51,426	3.23%	+2.97%
Marijuana	Brian Taylor	79	*	–	*	51,206	3.22%	*
Independent		30	-	-	–	14,588	0.92%	+0.28%
Reform	Bill Vander Zalm	9	2	-	-100%	3,439	0.22%	-9.05%
All Nations		6	*	-	*	3,380	0.21%	*
Conservative	Susan Power	6	-	-	–	2,417	0.15%	+0.09%
Social Credit	Grant Mitton	2	–	-	–	1,948	0.12%	-0.27%
BC Action		5	*	-	*	1,636	0.10%	*
No affiliation		6	*	-	*	727	0.05%	*
People's Front		11	*	-	*	720	0.05%	*
Western Reform		1	*	-	*	621	0.04%	*
Citizens Alliance Now		2	*	-	*	584	0.04%	*
Council of British Columbians		2	*	-	*	399	0.03%	*
Communist		4	–	-	–	381	0.02%	+0.01%
Freedom		2	*	-	*	240	0.02%	*
Party of Citizens....		2	*	-	*	147	0.01%	*
Patriot		1	*	-	*	82	0.01%	*
Citizens Commonwealth		4	*	-	*	49	x	*
Central		3	*	-	*	41	x	*
Total		456	75	79	+5.3%	1,591,306	100%	

Notes

x – less than 0.005% of the popular vote.

* The party did not nominate candidates in the previous election.

Unity Party results are calculated relative to Family Coalition Party results.

=== Vote and seat summaries ===
Ternary plots – shift of electoral support (1996–2001)
1996

2001
Electoral districts identified by colours of winning parties

Popular vote
Liberal	57.62%
NDP	21.56%
Green	12.39%
Others	8.43%

Seats summary
Liberal	97.47%
NDP	2.53%

== MLAs elected ==
Abbotsford-Clayburn: John van Dongen
Abbotsford-Mount Lehman: Mike de Jong
Alberni-Qualicum: Gillian Trumper
Bulkley Valley-Stikine: Dennis MacKay
Burnaby-Edmonds: Patty Sahota
Burnaby North: Richard Lee
Burnaby-Willingdon: John Nuraney
Burquitlam: Harry Bloy
Cariboo North: John Wilson
Cariboo South: David Zirnhelt
Chilliwack-Kent: Barry Penner
Chilliwack-Sumas: John Les
Columbia River-Revelstoke: Wendy McMahon
Comox Valley: Stan Hagen
Coquitlam-Maillardville: Richard Stewart
Cowichan-Ladysmith: Graham Bruce
Delta North: Reni Masi
Delta South: Val Roddick
East Kootenay: Bill Bennett
Esquimalt-Metchosin: Arnie Hamilton
Fort Langley-Aldergrove: Rich Coleman
Kamloops: Claude Richmond
Kamloops-North Thompson: Kevin Krueger
Kelowna-Lake Country: John Weisbeck
Kelowna-Mission: Sindi Hawkins
Langley: Lynn Stephens
Malahat-Juan de Fuca: Brian Kerr
Maple Ridge-Mission: Randy Hawes
Maple Ridge-Pitt Meadows: Ken Stewart
Nanaimo: Mike Hunter
Nanaimo-Parksville: Judith Reid
Nelson-Creston: Blair Suffredine
New Westminster: Joyce Murray
North Coast: Bill Belsey
North Island: Rod Visser
North Vancouver-Lonsdale: Katherine Whittred
North Vancouver-Seymour: Daniel Jarvis
Oak Bay-Gordon Head: Ida Chong
Okanagan-Vernon: Tom Christensen
Okanagan-Westside: Rick Thorpe
Peace River North: Richard Neufeld
Peace River South: Blair Lekstrom
Penticton-Okanagan Valley: Bill Barisoff
Port Coquitlam-Burke Mountain: Karn Manhas
Port Moody-Westwood: Christy Clark
Powell River-Sunshine Coast: Harold Long
Prince George-Mount Robson: Shirley Bond
Prince George North: Pat Bell
Prince George-Omineca: Paul Nettleton
Richmond Centre: Greg Halsey-Brandt
Richmond East: Linda Reid
Richmond-Steveston: Geoff Plant
Saanich North and the Islands: Murray Coell
Saanich South: Susan Brice
Shuswap: George Abbott
Skeena: Roger Harris
Surrey-Cloverdale: Kevin Falcon
Surrey-Green Timbers: Brenda Locke
Surrey-Newton: Tony Bhullar
Surrey-Panorama Ridge: Gulzar Cheema
Surrey-Tynehead: Dave Hayer
Surrey-Whalley: Elayne Brenzinger
Surrey-White Rock: Gordon Hogg
Vancouver-Burrard: Lorne Mayencourt
Vancouver-Fairview: Gary Farrell-Collins
Vancouver-Fraserview: Ken Johnston
Vancouver-Hastings: Joy MacPhail
Vancouver-Kensington: Patrick Wong
Vancouver-Kingsway: Rob Nijjar
Vancouver-Langara: Val Anderson
Vancouver-Mount Pleasant: Jenny Kwan
Vancouver-Point Grey: Gordon Campbell
Vancouver-Quilchena: Colin Hansen
Victoria-Beacon Hill: Jeff Bray
Victoria-Hillside: Sheila Orr
West Kootenay-Boundary: Sandy Santori
West Vancouver-Capilano: Ralph Sultan
West Vancouver-Garibaldi: Ted Nebbeling
Yale-Lillooet: David Chutter

=== Synopsis of results ===
Results by riding – 2001 British Columbia general election
Riding	Winning party						Turnout (Note: including spoilt ballots)	Votes (Note: parties receiving more than 1% of the popular vote, or fielding candidates in at least half of the constituencies, are listed separately. Reform is also listed separately, as it was a major contender in 1996, to identify the districts that still nominated candidates.)								
Name	1996	Party	Votes	Share	Margin #	Margin %	Turnout	Lib	NDP	Grn	Un	Mari	Ref	Ind	Oth	Total
Abbotsford-Clayburn	New	Lib	12,584	72.51%	10,488	60.43%	71.30%	12,584	2,096	–	1,751	706	–	–	217	17,354
Abbotsford-Mount Lehman	Lib	Lib	12,660	68.48%	10,229	55.33%	71.44%	12,660	2,431	1,299	1,576	451	–	–	69	18,486
Alberni-Qualicum	New	Lib	13,109	53.32%	5,714	23.24%	74.70%	13,109	7,395	2,999	–	1,081	–	–	–	24,584
Bulkley Valley-Stikine	NDP	Lib	7,414	55.93%	4,591	34.64%	73.28%	7,414	2,823	856	1,190	507	–	–	467	13,257
Burnaby-Edmonds	NDP	Lib	9,607	51.09%	4,683	24.90%	69.90%	9,607	4,924	2,599	1,111	456	–	–	105	18,802
Burnaby North	NDP	Lib	11,062	54.37%	5,070	24.92%	71.52%	11,062	5,992	2,824	–	466	–	–	–	20,344
Burnaby-Willingdon	NDP	Lib	10,207	55.79%	5,599	30.60%	70.07%	10,207	4,608	2,879	–	362	–	–	240	18,296
Burquitlam	New	Lib	11,131	56.34%	6,453	32.66%	70.95%	11,131	4,678	2,668	749	530	–	–	–	19,756
Cariboo North	Lib	Lib	10,044	64.97%	7,312	47.30%	72.46%	10,044	2,732	712	420	509	–	727	316	15,460
Cariboo South	NDP	Lib	10,259	62.21%	6,000	36.38%	74.70%	10,259	4,259	–	598	739	–	–	635	16,490
Chilliwack-Kent	New	Lib	13,814	74.88%	11,659	63.20%	71.63%	13,814	2,155	1,511	–	968	–	–	–	18,448
Chilliwack-Sumas	New	Lib	14,137	74.80%	11,703	61.92%	70.58%	14,137	2,434	–	–	1,130	–	–	1,199	18,900
Columbia River-Revelstoke	NDP	Lib	7,804	53.95%	3,253	22.49%	71.96%	7,804	4,551	978	490	642	–	–	–	14,465
Comox Valley	NDP	Lib	15,569	56.32%	10,213	36.95%	74.81%	15,569	5,356	5,170	677	873	–	–	–	27,645
Coquitlam-Maillardville	NDP	Lib	11,549	56.97%	7,107	35.07%	71.42%	11,549	4,442	2,522	862	584	–	314	–	20,273
Cowichan-Ladysmith	NDP	Lib	12,707	52.21%	4,924	20.23%	76.71%	12,707	7,783	3,250	–	597	–	–	–	24,337
Delta North	Lib	Lib	11,919	60.54%	8,185	41.57%	72.65%	11,919	3,734	2,504	987	543	–	–	–	19,687
Delta South	Lib	Lib	14,596	67.00%	10,946	50.25%	73.15%	14,596	2,053	3,650	760	507	–	219	–	21,784
East Kootenay	NDP	Lib	10,206	61.85%	6,568	39.80%	68.76%	10,206	3,638	1,287	651	718	–	–	–	16,500
Esquimalt-Metchosin	NDP	Lib	9,544	45.79%	3,286	15.76%	69.49%	9,544	6,258	3,685	268	534	–	230	322	20,841
Fort Langley-Aldergrove	Lib	Lib	16,527	68.30%	13,761	56.87%	73.47%	16,527	2,619	2,766	1,275	674	–	336	–	24,197
Kamloops	NDP	Lib	12,258	60.21%	7,666	37.66%	68.72%	12,258	4,592	2,180	430	707	–	193	–	20,360
Kamloops-North Thompson	Lib	Lib	12,676	58.04%	8,495	38.90%	72.65%	12,676	4,181	3,122	836	1,025	–	–	–	21,840
Kelowna-Lake Country	Lib	Lib	14,093	63.19%	10,991	49.28%	66.91%	14,093	3,102	2,606	1,496	734	–	–	272	22,303
Kelowna-Mission	Lib	Lib	15,351	64.60%	12,285	51.70%	67.56%	15,351	3,066	2,588	1,674	787	–	–	296	23,762
Langley	Lib	Lib	14,564	64.85%	11,717	52.17%	71.97%	14,564	2,720	2,847	1,605	723	–	–	–	22,459
Malahat-Juan de Fuca	NDP	Lib	9,676	42.26%	4,512	19.70%	73.57%	9,676	3,687	3,275	323	547	–	5,164	222	22,894
Maple Ridge-Mission	NDP	Lib	12,920	56.67%	8,210	36.01%	70.87%	12,920	4,710	2,910	1,037	908	–	315	–	22,800
Maple Ridge-Pitt Meadows	NDP	Lib	12,235	52.96%	6,471	28.01%	72.90%	12,235	5,764	3,069	1,220	716	–	–	97	23,101
Nanaimo	NDP	Lib	9,748	44.64%	3,146	14.41%	69.87%	9,748	6,602	3,810	588	889	–	199	–	21,836
Nanaimo-Parksville	New	Lib	17,356	62.60%	11,504	41.49%	74.94%	17,356	5,852	3,192	693	634	–	–	–	21,836
Nelson-Creston	NDP	Lib	8,558	39.00%	1,577	7.18%	75.32%	8,558	6,981	4,723	1,108	570	–	–	–	21,940
New Westminster	NDP	Lib	11,059	49.20%	4,088	18.18%	71.07%	11,059	6,971	2,982	604	859	–	–	–	22,475
North Coast	NDP	Lib	4,915	45.25%	831	7.64%	66.27%	4,915	4,084	560	152	623	–	–	526	10,860
North Island	NDP	Lib	13,781	57.12%	7,406	30.70%	73.69%	13,781	6,375	2,871	–	1,099	–	–	–	24,126
North Vancouver-Lonsdale	Lib	Lib	11,362	59.84%	7,539	39.70%	68.16%	11,362	3,016	3,823	–	612	–	–	173	18,986
North Vancouver-Seymour	Lib	Lib	15,568	65.12%	11,441	47.86%	73.72%	15,568	2,751	4,127	–	568	683	209	–	23,906
Oak Bay-Gordon Head	Lib	Lib	14,588	57.31%	8,799	34.57%	75.54%	14,588	5,789	4,666	–	411	–	–	–	25,454
Okanagan-Vernon	Lib	Lib	13,868	56.51%	10,339	42.13%	69.06%	13,868	3,529	2,214	3,213	917	–	562	239	24,542
Okanagan-Westside	New	Lib	14,181	68.08%	11,005	52.83%	69.91%	14,181	3,176	–	1,364	1,188	–	–	921	20,830
Peace River North	Ref	Lib	6,629	73.22%	5,582	61.66%	55.12%	6,629	1,047	–	568	810	–	–	–	9,054
Peace River South	Ref	Lib	6,393	64.20%	4,667	46.87%	62.37%	6,393	767	407	225	444	–	–	1,726	9,962
Penticton-Okanagan Valley	Lib	Lib	15,609	62.73%	11,722	47.11%	68.15%	15,609	3,887	3,524	553	786	–	–	522	24,881
Port Coquitlam-Burke Mountain	New	Lib	9,963	45.19%	2,765	12.54%	74.66%	9,963	7,198	1,841	2,297	446	150	151	–	22,046
Port Moody-Westwood	New	Lib	16,500	74.64%	12,322	55.74%	71.80%	16,500	4,178	–	–	1,428	–	–	–	22,106
Powell River-Sunshine Coast	PD	Lib	9,904	42.36%	3,555	15.21%	76.33%	9,904	6,349	6,316	–	812	–	–	–	23,381
Prince George-Mount Robson	NDP	Lib	8,033	55.72%	5,378	37.30%	68.80%	8,033	2,655	1,429	1,110	744	445	–	–	14,416
Prince George North	NDP	Lib	9,215	61.02%	7,067	46.80%	71.77%	9,215	2,148	1,137	838	588	–	554	621	15,101
Prince George-Omineca	Lib	Lib	10,469	61.65%	7,313	43.07%	73.70%	10,469	3,156	1,026	1,685	646	–	–	–	16,982
Richmond Centre	Lib	Lib	12,061	71.86%	9,855	58.72%	69.10%	12,061	2,206	1,615	381	357	–	–	165	16,785
Richmond East	Lib	Lib	12,498	69.18%	9,948	55.07%	70.59%	12,498	2,550	1,802	599	445	–	173	–	18,067
Richmond-Steveston	Lib	Lib	14,508	69.23%	11,944	56.99%	73.27%	14,508	2,564	2,257	381	561	145	358	181	20,955
Saanich North and the Islands	Lib	Lib	15,406	54.29%	8,195	28.88%	75.94%	15,406	5,011	7,211	–	491	–	257	–	28,376
Saanich South	NDP	Lib	12,699	52.17%	5,861	24.08%	76.00%	12,699	6,838	3,823	–	462	–	172	349	24,343
Shuswap	Lib	Lib	12,950	56.27%	9,162	39.81%	72.01%	12,950	3,788	2,423	2,857	835	–	–	160	23,013
Skeena	NDP	Lib	8,653	65.15%	6,009	45.24%	72.13%	8,653	2,644	695	–	810	–	–	479	13,281
Surrey-Cloverdale	Lib	Lib	13,739	63.72%	11,406	52.90%	75.45%	13,739	2,333	2,227	1,112	481	–	1,669	–	21,561
Surrey-Green Timbers	NDP	Lib	7,539	48.95%	1,947	12.64%	66.77%	7,539	5,592	–	1,067	561	538	–	103	15,400
Surrey-Newton	NDP	Lib	6,750	49.45%	2,801	20.52%	65.51%	6,750	3,949	1,673	498	348	431	–	–	13,649
Surrey-Panorama Ridge	New	Lib	9,590	58.94%	6,350	39.03%	69.04%	9,590 (Note: Gulzar Singh Cheema was previously a member of the Legislative Assembly of Manitoba)	3,240	1,437	1,123	424	408	–	50	16,272
Surrey-Tynehead	New	Lib	12,252	60.95%	9,093	45.23%	72.25%	12,252	3,159	1,876	1,234	385	265	930	–	20,101
Surrey-Whalley	NDP	Lib	6,693	45.73%	2,157	14.74%	66.79%	6,693	4,536	1,652	838	544	374	–	–	14,637
Surrey-White Rock	Lib	Lib	18,678	68.70%	15,101	55.54%	77.64%	18,678	3,415	3,577	983	536	–	–	–	27,189
Vancouver-Burrard	NDP	Lib	11,396	48.11%	4,037	17.04%	63.67%	11,396	7,359	3,826	906		–	136	65	23,688
Vancouver-Fairview	Lib	Lib	12,864	54.94%	7,813	33.37%	64.20%	12,864	4,772	5,051	–	651	–	–	76	23,414
Vancouver-Fraserview	NDP	Lib	10,361	56.84%	4,546	24.93%	71.61%	10,361	5,815	1,417	369	267	–	–	–	18,229
Vancouver-Hastings	NDP	NDP	8,009	41.64%	409	2.13%	68.11%	7,600	8,009	2,874	–	409	–	–	341	19,233
Vancouver-Kensington	NDP	Lib	9,162	47.56%	1,684	8.74%	73.09%	9,162	7,478	1,795	314	516	–	–	–	19,265
Vancouver-Kingsway	NDP	Lib	8,264	49.89%	2,835	17.11%	67.14%	8,264	5,429	1,725	541	364	–	–	240	16,563
Vancouver-Langara	Lib	Lib	11,800	66.90%	8,801	49.90%	67.38%	11,800	2,999	2,009	–	673	–	–	156	17,637
Vancouver-Mount Pleasant	NDP	NDP	7,163	44.48%	1,820	11.30%	59.36%	5,343	7,163	2,612	166	489	–	–	332	16,105
Vancouver-Point Grey	Lib	Lib	13,430	56.14%	8,336	34.85%	65.80%	13,430	4,441	5,094	257	659	–	–	43	23,924
Vancouver-Quilchena	Lib	Lib	16,829	73.86%	13,552	59.48%	73.44%	16,829	2,168	3,277	–	351	–	160	–	22,785
Victoria-Beacon Hill	NDP	Lib	9,297	37.04%	35	0.14%	68.63%	9,297	9,262	5,453	290	532	–	205	64	25,103
Victoria-Hillside	NDP	Lib	7,878	37.71%	82	0.40%	68.73%	7,878	7,796	4,142	293	663	–	–	121	20,893
West Kootenay-Boundary	New	Lib	10,784	49.74%	3,869	17.85%	74.42%	10,784	6,915	2,004	1,139	840	–	–	–	21,682
West Vancouver-Capilano	Lib	Lib	15,556	72.69%	12,624	58.99%	72.67%	15,556	1,284	2,932	–	274	–	1,355	–	21,401
West Vancouver-Garibaldi	Lib	Lib	14,542	68.18%	10,851	50.88%	68.19%	14,542	2,330	3,691	–	767	–	–	–	21,330
Yale-Lillooet	NDP	Lib	9,845	60.07%	7,028	42.88%	68.99%	9,845	2,817	1,657	–	807	–	–	1,262	16,388

= Open seat
= turnout is above provincial average
= winning candidate was in previous Legislature
= Incumbent had switched allegiance
= Previously incumbent in another riding
= Not incumbent; was previously elected to the Legislature
= Incumbency arose from by-election gain
= other incumbents renominated
= previously an MP in the House of Commons of Canada
= Multiple candidates

== See also ==
- List of British Columbia political parties
