= Democratic Reform British Columbia =

Canadian provincial political party (2005–2011)

- Former provincial party
- Leader: Graeme Rodger
- President: George O'Briain
- Founded: January 15, 2005
- Dissolved: c. 2011
- Headquarters: Victoria, British Columbia
- Ideology: Fiscal responsibility; Progressivism
- Colours: Maroon and dark green

Democratic Reform British Columbia (Democratic Reform BC or DR BC) was a provincial political party in British Columbia, Canada. It described itself as "fiscally responsible" and "socially progressive".

== Formation ==
The party was brought together by Tom Morino as an attempt to recreate the Progressive Democratic Alliance (PDA) that had been formed by Gordon Wilson. The party is the result of a merger between the British Columbia Democratic Coalition (an umbrella grouping of the British Columbia Democratic Alliance, British Columbia Moderate Democratic Movement and British Columbia Labour Party) and the All Nations Party of British Columbia. It also attracted some members of the Reform Party of British Columbia, including its president, and all its executive. In the year preceding the formation of Democratic Reform BC, Tom Morino had founded the British Columbia Democratic Alliance which later became the British Columbia Democratic Coalition after a merger with a number of other fringe parties. This provided the momentum for the mergers with Reform Party and the All Nations Party to form DR BC.

DR BC had one member in the Legislative Assembly, Elayne Brenzinger, who was elected as a BC Liberal in 2001 but left the party and sat as an independent from March 22, 2004 to January 19, 2005.

DR BC described itself as "fiscally responsible", "socially progressive", and supportive of the single transferable vote system of electoral reform proposed for provincial elections.

The party held its founding convention on January 15, 2005 in White Rock, British Columbia, and adopted a policy manual and constitution. Tom Morino was unanimously elected as interim party leader.

== 2005 election ==
It planned to run candidates in all 79 ridings in the 2005 provincial election, but was unable to run more than 38. None were elected as the party received only 14,023 votes throughout the province, or 0.80% of all votes. Morino received 4.65% of the votes in his riding, coming fourth behind BC Green Party candidate Steven Hurdle. Brenzinger received 3.75% of the votes in her riding. Alan Clarke, the party's agriculture critic, Kelowna – Lake Country, finished a top all DR BC candidates with 8.9% of the vote in Kelowna. Janice Money of Westbank also fared well. With limited and sporadic coverage from the established media, the highest any DR BC candidate placed in their local race was fourth.

== After the 2005 election ==
On June 1, 2005, Morino announced his departure from politics to care for his ailing wife. Morino officially resigned at the party's annual general meeting October 1, 2005 in Kelowna. He was replaced as leader by Graeme Rodger.

The party did not nominate any candidates in the 2009 provincial election.

Up to April 8, 2009, the party website had not been updated for more than a year. Most of their online work had been done by Matthew Laird, who had left the party to run for the BC Greens. A new version was launched on April 8 with very little information on the party's election plans. The website was later revised to state that "The Executive of Democratic Reform BC [DR BC] has deregistered the Party."

== Leaders ==
- Tom Morino (January 2005 – October 2005)
- Erle Martz (October 2005, interim)
- Graeme Rodger (October 2005 – December 2011)
