= British Columbia Unity Party =

- Former provincial party
- Founded: 2001
- Dissolved: 2008
- Headquarters: Surrey, British Columbia
- Ideology: Conservatism; Populism
- Colours: Blue and green

The British Columbia Unity Party was a political party in British Columbia, Canada. The party was founded as an attempted union of five conservative parties: the Reform Party of British Columbia, the British Columbia Social Credit Party, the British Columbia Conservative Party, the British Columbia Party, and the Family Coalition Party of British Columbia. Members from the first four parties joined with the Family Coalition Party to refound the Family Coalition Party as the BC Unity Party on January 10, 2001. The party was formed to present a united conservative option to voters in opposition to the centre-right BC Liberals and the centre-left New Democratic Party (NDP).

== History ==
The party was founded in January 2001.

Five months after the party was founded, it nominated 56 candidates across the province for the May 16, 2001 provincial elections. During the election campaign, BC Unity positioned itself as a solidly conservative party, in contrast to the BC Liberals. Despite being included in the leaders debate, along with Premier Dosanjh and Liberal Leader Gordon Campbell the unpopularity of the NDP government was so great that most conservative-minded voters chose to vote for the BC Liberals, rather than split the right-of-centre vote once again. The party received only 3.2% of the vote (51,426).

On September 1, 2004, BC Unity and the British Columbia Conservative Party announced an agreement-in-principle for the two parties to merge under the Conservative Party name. The deal, however, fell through after BC Conservative Leader Barry Chilton withdrew. At the Unity annual general meeting held on September 24 and 25, 2004 in Coquitlam, the BC Unity Party was presented with another proposal of merger by the Conservatives. The Unity delegates did not accept this proposal and instead, affirmed the original agreement-in-principle. This action was not accepted by the BC Conservatives and the merger failed. BC Unity leader Chris Delaney blamed himself for the failure of the merger and resigned.

Many BC Unity members left the party prior to the September 2004 annual general meeting in order to join the Conservatives and to influence them into accepting the agreement-in-principle. When the merger failed, these former members did not return to the Unity party.

In 2005, BC Unity named Daniel Stelmacker as its interim leader. Stelmacker had been a party candidate for the Nanaimo-Parksville electoral district in the 2001 election. In 2005, Stelmacker was the party's sole nominated candidate for the 2005 provincial election, running in the Skeena riding. He won 224 votes, 1.74% of the total for the riding.

The party held its last annual general meeting on Saturday, October 29, 2005, in Maple Ridge, British Columbia.

The party merged with the British Columbia Conservative Party in 2008. Afterwards, in February 2009, the Unity Party's leadership was kept when it was challenged which went to the Supreme Court of Canada.

== See also ==
- List of British Columbia political parties

Preceded by Family Coalition Party of British Columbia	British Columbia Unity Party; 2001 - 2008	Succeeded by BC Conservative Party
