= 39th Parliament of British Columbia =

2009–2013 session of the Legislative Assembly

- Majority parliament
- Jun. 3, 2009 – Apr. 16, 2013

Parliament leaders
- Premier: Gordon Campbell; 5 June 2001 – 14 March 2011
- Christy Clark; 14 March 2011 – 18 July 2017
- Cabinets: Campbell III; C. Clark I
- Leader of the Opposition: Carole James; 17 May 2005 – 19 January 2011
- Dawn Black; 19 January – 17 April 2011
- Adrian Dix; 17 April 2011 – 4 May 2014

Party caucuses
- Government: Liberal Party
- Opposition: New Democratic Party
- Unrecognized: Conservative Party

Legislative Assembly
- Speaker of the Assembly: Bill Barisoff; 12 September 2005 – 14 March 2013
- Members: 85 MLA seats

Sovereign
- Monarch: Elizabeth II; 6 February 1952 – present
- Lieutenant governor: Steven Point; 1 October 2007 – 2 November 2012
- Judith Guichon; 2 November 2012 – present

Sessions
- 1st session August 25, 2009 – February 9, 2010
- 2nd session February 9, 2010 – February 14, 2011
- 3rd session February 14, 2011 – October 3, 2011
- 4th session October 3, 2011 – February 12, 2013
- 5th session February 12, 2013 – March 14, 2013
← 38th	→ 40th

The 39th Parliament of British Columbia sat from 2009 to 2013, succeeding the 38th parliament. It was composed of two elements: the Legislative Assembly of British Columbia, as elected by the general election of May 12, 2009, and The Queen represented by the lieutenant governor (Steven Point until 2012, then Judith Guichon). That election resulted in a majority government for the BC Liberal Party led by Gordon Campbell, and a BC New Democratic Party official opposition.

Shortly after the election, the government revealed it had been running record high deficits and that it intended to replace the PST and GST system with the harmonized sales tax. The deficit made an amendment to the Balanced Budget and Ministerial Accountability Act necessary for the remainder of the 39th Parliament and resulted in reduced spending in most ministries. A petition against the Harmonized Sales Tax was circulated around the province and resulted in a summer 2011 referendum on the issue.

The unpopularity of the move towards HST led to the resignation of Premier Campbell. The ensuing leadership election was won by Christy Clark, who was subsequently sworn in as the new Premier on March 14, 2011. Separately and independently, the New Democrats also held a leadership election, and Adrian Dix became the new leader of the Opposition.

Seven MLAs spent time as independents: Vicki Huntington was elected as an independent, Blair Lekstrom left the BC Liberals in protest of its implementation of the HST, Pat Pimm briefly left the BC Liberals as he was being investigated for a domestic dispute incident, John Slater withdrew from the BC Liberal Party after they refused to endorse his re-election nomination in 2013, John van Dongen crossed the floor to the BC Conservatives before leaving that party to sit as an independent, and both BC Liberal Bill Bennett and NDP Bob Simpson were removed from their caucuses for criticizing their leaders. Three MLAs were subject of police investigations: Kash Heed for election irregularities, Jane Thornthwaite for drunk driving, and Pat Pimm for a domestic dispute. Two MLAs, both from the BC Liberals, resigned their seats forcing by-elections: Iain Black in Port Moody-Coquitlam and Barry Penner in Chilliwack-Hope.

In addition to the Consumption Tax Rebate and Transition Act which implemented the HST, major new legislation adopted during the 39th Parliament included the Clean Energy Act, which listed and enabled provincial objectives regarding electricity generation and consumption. The Ambulance Services Collective Agreement Act forced the workers at the BC Ambulance Service back to work after a seven-month strike. The Sled Dog Task Force and the Braidwood Inquiry led to legislative amendments, the New West Partnership (Trade, Investment and Labour Mobility Agreement) had enabling legislation enacted, and inheritance laws were modernized. The Skaha Bluffs Provincial Park was created, as well as six new parks in the Lillooet region

== 1st Session ==
The 1st session of the 39th Parliament began on August 25, 2009 with the Speech from the Throne delivered by Lieutenant-Governor Steven Point. Gordon Campbell was Premier and Colin Hansen was Deputy Premier and Minister of Finance. Shortly after the May 2009 elections they revealed their intention to replace the separate provincial and federal sales tax (PST and GST) system with a Harmonized Sales Tax (HST). This 'harmonization' of provincial and federal sales taxes became highly controversial throughout the province. In September, the 2009 budget update revealed they would run a much higher deficit than had been forecast which led to charges that the BC Liberals had been misleading the public during the elections regarding the financial health of the province. The deficit projection was increased to $2.8 billion, the largest in BC history, the result of declining tax revenue and natural resource royalties from the continuing recession. The budget update accepted the deficit with small increases in funding for health care, education and social services, with reductions in all other ministries, combined with cuts to personal and small-business taxes and an amendment to the Balanced Budget and Ministerial Accountability Act allowing four years of deficit.

By the time the session ended on February 9, 2010, there were 24 bills given royal assent: 21 government bills and 3 private bills. Among the bills was modernization of insurance and inheritance laws with the Insurance Amendment Act, 2009 and the Wills, Estates and Succession Act. The Labour Mobility Act enacted portions of the Trade, Investment and Labour Mobility Agreement. In light of the ongoing Braidwood Inquiry, Kash Heed, the Minister of Public Safety and Solicitor General, introduced the Police (Misconduct, Complaints, Investigations, Discipline and Proceedings) Amendment Act which increased the Office of the Police Complaint Commissioner's ability to investigate public complaints against police, though the bill was criticized for perpetuating "cops investigating cops" investigations rather than implementing civilian oversight. Heed also sponsored the Motor Vehicle Amendment Act, 2009 which banned the use of cell phones while driving (except with the use of hands-free technology) and the Body Armour Control Act which introduced the requirement for permits and licensing for the sale and ownership of body armour. To help cope with the pine beetle epidemic, the Minister of Forests and Range Pat Bell introduced the Wood First Act, which required that all new provincially funded buildings use wood as the primary building material and increased the maximum height for wood structures from four storeys to six in the Building Code. The Protected Areas of British Columbia Amendment Act, 2009 created the Skaha Bluffs Provincial Park near Penticton and the Det san Ecological Reserve near Smithers.

Controversial new laws included the Assistance to Shelter Act which allowed police to use force in taking a person at risk to emergency shelters. Even though it was a government bill sponsored by Rich Coleman, the Minister of Housing and Social Development, it was opposed by backbencher and fellow BC Liberal Norm Letnick. The law was prompted by the death of a homeless Vancouver woman during a weather event, but critics saw it as a measure to remove undesirable people from streets during the Winter Olympic Games. An amendment to the Housing and Social Development Statutes Act stopped the payments of welfare, disability, or other income assistance to people with outstanding warrants. It was criticized as targeting people accused, not proven guilty, of crimes and resulted in several protests. Following a labour dispute and a seven-month strike by the BC Ambulance Service, the Minister of Health Kevin Falcon introduced back-to-work legislation on November 2 (and given royal assent five days later) with the Ambulance Services Collective Agreement Act forcing the union to accept the latest contract offer.

== 2nd Session ==
The 2nd session of the 39th Parliament began on February 9, 2010 with the Speech from the Throne delivered by Lieutenant-Governor Point. Premier Gordon Campbell kept the same executive council as the first session. Following the Olympics, that year's budget was released, projecting a $1.7 billion deficit, with little changes to taxation but more funding for Ministry of Community and Rural Development and a significant cut to the Ministry of Forests and Range. In April Mike de Jong added Minister of Public Safety and Solicitor-General to his duties, replacing Kash Heed who resigned the posts in response to RCMP investigations into political fundraising irregularities. A small cabinet shuffle was made in June, when Blair Lekstrom resigned from the BC Liberals in protest of the implementation of the HST. Bill Bennett replaced Lekstrom as Minister of Energy, Mines and Petroleum Resources and Ben Stewart replaced Bennett as Minister of Community and Rural Development. In the same June re-shuffle, Mary McNeil was promoted from Minister of State (Olympics and ActNow BC) to Minister of Citizens Services. Before the end of the year, both BC Liberal Bill Bennett and NDP Bob Simpson were removed from their caucuses due to criticism of their leaders.

By the time the session ended in June, there were 23 bills given royal assent: 21 government bills and 2 private bills. Among the bills was the Zero Net Deforestation Act requiring equal areas of trees be planted as are cleared, the Forestry Service Providers Protection Act creating an insurance fund for small logging contractors, the Armoured Vehicle and After-Market Compartment Control Act prohibiting aftermarket installations of hidden compartments in vehicles while requiring permits for vehicles reinforced with armour, the Gunshot and Stab Wound Disclosure Act requiring health-care facilities to report to police treated gunshot and stab wounds, and a modernization of the Veterinarians Act. The Haida Gwaii Reconciliation Act legally turned the name of the Queen Charlotte Islands to Haida Gwaii. The Protected Areas of British Columbia Amendment Act, 2010 converted much of the Spruce Lake Protected Area into the South Chilcotin Mountains Provincial Park, added six new provincial parks in the Lillooet region (South Chilcotin Mountains Provincial Park, Bridge River Delta, French Bar Creek, Gwyneth Lake, Fred Antoine and Yalakom), added one park in the Shuswap area (Oregana Creek Provincial Park), and added land to twelve other existing parks.

The Clean Energy Act was introduced by Blair Lekstrom on April 28 (and given royal assent on June 3). The legislation was based on the recommendations of the Green Energy Advisory Task Force. The act updated the feed-in tariff system, exempted projects such as the Site C dam, new installations at Mica Dam, and the northwest transmission line from review by the British Columbia Utilities Commission, restricted the use of the Burrard Generating Station, re-integrated parts of the BC Transmission Corporation back into BC Hydro, created a First Nations Clean Energy Business Fund, required smart meters be installed onto buildings, prohibited future dam construction on certain rivers, and listed provincial energy-related objectives. It was criticized based on the belief that the act would result in increased electricity rates and disallow the development of natural gas-fuelled power plants.

A controversial law was the Consumption Tax Rebate and Transition Act, introduced by the Minister of Finance Colin Hansen on March 30 (and given royal assent on April 29), which eliminated the provincial sales tax in favour of the Harmonized Sales Tax. An anti-HST petition was launched by former-Premier Bill Vander Zalm and quickly achieved the needed targets (10% of people in all 85 ridings) in accordance with the Recall and Initiative Act. The petition of 700,000 signatures survived a court challenge by business groups in favour of the HST and, in August 2010, the petition was validated by Elections BC. The petition was forwarded to the Select Standing Committee on Legislative Initiatives, chaired by Terry Lake, which split along party lines with the minority NDP voting to accept the recommendation of the petition by sending a draft HST Extinguishment Act to the Legislative Assembly and the majority BC Liberals voting to initiate a province-wide referendum. The unpopular HST resulted in low approval ratings for the BC Liberals and Premier Campbell who initiated a late-October major re-shuffling of his executive council, restructuring the ministries and, two weeks prior to the submission of the Select Standing Committee on Finance and Government Services' report on budget priorities, committed all of the remaining budget to income tax reductions. Nevertheless, Campbell announced his resignation as Premier in early-November and the BC Liberals reversed the income tax reductions. Following the BC Liberal Party leadership election, Christy Clark was named Premier, and following the unrelated BC New Democratic Party leadership election Adrian Dix was named leader of the opposition.

== 3rd Session ==
The 3rd session formally began on February 14, 2011 with the Speech from the Throne delivered by Lieutenant-Governor Point. Once Clark took over as Premier she appointed her own cabinet, removing Colin Hansen, Murray Coell, Kevin Krueger, and Ben Stewart from the executive council, demoting Iain Black, Margaret MacDiarmid and Moira Stilwell to parliamentary secretary, but promoting Naomi Yamamoto, Don McRae, Terry Lake, and Harry Bloy to ministerial positions, as well as re-instating Blair Lekstrom as a minister. Premier Clark moved quickly on several leadership campaign promises by increasing the minimum wage and eliminating parking fees at provincial parks. She reorganized the harmonized sales tax referendum to use postal voting in June–July. In May Clark announced that, if the HST was approved by voters, that the provincial government would issue one-time only cash rebates of $175 per child and low-income seniors and reduce the HST from 12% to 10%. While the 2011 budget was presented on February 15 by Campbell's finance minister Colin Hansen, Clark and her Minister of Finance Kevin Falcon updated the budget in Fall 2011, after the HST referendum. Following the rejection of the HST, Falcon estimated the government would incur $2.3 billion in costs (over three years) for restoring PST, effectively tripling that year's deficit. Clark also kept the possibility of a fall 2011 provincial election open. Clark won a spring by-election in Vancouver-Point Grey and Parliamentary Secretary for Natural Gas Pat Pimm briefly left the BC Liberal caucus and his parliamentary secretary position while under investigation for a domestic dispute.

By June, Parliament had 15 bills given royal assent, all of them government bills. The Prevention of Cruelty to Animals Amendment Act, 2011 enacted the recommendations of the Sled Dog Task Force, a task force led by fellow BC Liberal MLA Terry Lake created after it was revealed that nearly 100 sled dogs were culled in Whistler due to a drop in tourism and revenue after the Olympics. The New West Partnership Trade Agreement Implementation Act enacted portions of the New West Partnership. The Civil Forfeiture Amendment Act, 2011 made it easier for the province to seize cash and property associated with unlawful activity The Coastal Ferry Amendment Act, 2011 initiated a review of BC Ferries and its related legislation. The Police (Independent Investigations Office) Amendment Act, 2011 partly implemented a recommendation from the Braidwood Inquiry which would allow the executive council to appoint a civilian to the Independent Investigations Office, though subordinate to the Attorney General, which would investigate allegations against police. The Yale First Nation Final Agreement Act ratified a treaty with the Yale First Nation.

== 4th Session ==
During summer 2011, BC Liberal leader Christy Clark asked all her caucus members to inform the party on whether they would be seeking re-election, increasing speculation that she would call an early election. Iain Black subsequently announced he would vacate his seat effective October 3 and Barry Penner resigned as Attorney General, replaced by Shirley Bond, as he would not seek re-election . In August, the HST referendum was completed with the electorate voting 55% in favour of reverting to the PST. Just before the parliament convened in October 2011 for the 4th session, Clark shuffled her executive council, promoting Margaret MacDiarmid back into the cabinet, promoting Ron Cantelon to a parliamentary secretary position, and demoting Harry Bloy to Minister of State of Multiculturalism, the only Minister of State in her cabinet. Bloy resigned from the Minister of State position six months later. In late-March 2012 Abbotsford South MLA John van Dongen withdrew his membership with the BC Liberals and joined the BC Conservative Party, though he sat as an independent because the BC Conservative Party did not have official party status in the Legislative Assembly.

Fourteen new pieces of legislation were adopted in Fall 2011, including the Nurse Practitioners Statutes Amendment Act which inserted roles for nurse practitioners in the health care system; the Greater Vancouver Transit Enhancement Act which raised the fuel tax within Metro Vancouver to fund the proposed Evergreen Line SkyTrain extension; the Regulatory Reporting Act which requires the provincial government to annually report on changes to regulations; the Personal Property Security Amendment Act which allows transferable licences issued by the province to be used as collateral; and the Natural Resource Compliance Act which merged all Crown land compliance and enforcement staff into a new positions called "natural resource officers". The Metal Dealers and Recyclers Act created a Registrar of Metal Dealers and Recyclers in which people who buy and sell scrap metal will be registered and requires them to record and report transactions. The Teachers Act repealed the Teaching Profession Act and dissolved the old act's BC College of Teachers to make way for the new BC Teachers' Council and a Disciplinary and Professional Conduct Board. The new teacher regulations and disciplinary procedures were meant to fix the old system which had become ineffective, but it was criticized for making disciplinary hearings of teachers open to the public. The Family Law Act gave couples who have lived together for two or more years the same rights as married couples.

Seven more pieces of legislation were adopted in March 2012. The Education Improvement Act was passed following months of contract negotiations between the government and the BC Teachers Federation and subsequent escalating job action by teacher which culminated in a 3-day strike in March. The legislation ordered the members back to work, enabled the government to appoint a mediator, and created a $165 million Learning Improvement Fund for school districts to hire additional special education assistants, increase teaching time, and fund professional development for teachers. The Auditor General for Local Government Act created a new auditor general office that would focus on municipalities and regional districts. The Offence Amendment Act, 2011 amended the Offence Act to provide the courts with numerous conditions (like not possessing weapons or intoxicating substances) for probation sentences and to allow police officers to arrest, without warrant, those found violating the terms of their probation.

In May, 29 more bills were adopted. New laws included the Provincial Sales Tax Act reinstating the PST (and abolishing the HST), the New Housing Transition Tax and Rebate Act which provided HST rebates for new houses, the Family Day Act which made the second Monday of February a public holiday, the Athletic Commissioner Act created the position of Provincial Athletic Commissioner to regulate professional mixed martial arts and boxing contests, the Emergency Intervention Disclosure Act now allows individuals to ask the courts to order someone with whom they have had contact with during an emergency to have a health test, the Civil Resolution Tribunal Act created a new dispute resolution and adjudicative body to divert some small claims and strata property disputes away from the court system, the First Nations Commercial and Industrial Development Act to help facilitate a proposed liquefied natural gas plant on the Haisla Nation reserve and a commercial and residential development on Squamish Nation reserve, the Criminal Asset Management Act added a criminal component to the civil forfeiture process, and the Pharmaceutical Services Act enshrined the Provincial Drug Program (PharmaCare) into law and now allows the province to regulate prices for generic drugs. Amendments to existing laws included adding new tax rebates for first time home buyers and home renovation tax credits for seniors (Income Tax Amendment Act, 2012), eliminating the requirement for BC Hydro to acquire an extra 3,000 gigawatt hours per year of insurance energy by 2020 (Energy and Mines Statutes Amendment Act, 2012), moving appeals for seized animals to BC Farm Industry Review Board (Prevention of Cruelty to Animals Amendment Act, 2012), expanding coverage of mental stress claims (Workers Compensation Amendment Act, 2011), improving fare enforcement at Translink (South Coast British Columbia Transportation Authority Amendment Act, 2012), adding land to (and renaming) Atlin/Téix'gi Aan Tlein Park, creating 10 new conservancies in northwestern BC, and upgrading two recreation areas to Provincial Parks (Protected Areas of British Columbia Amendment Act, 2012), as well as a modernization of the Limitation Act and the Pension Benefits Standards Act. The Coastal Ferry Amendment Act, 2012, followed up on the 3rd Session's Coastal Ferry Amendment Act's review of BC Ferries and its related legislation by enhancing regulatory oversight powers of the commissioner. The Motor Vehicle Amendment Act, 2012 responded to a court ruling by easing the Immediate Roadside Prohibition program.

== 5th Session ==
During a nine-month break between the 4th and 5th sessions, Premier Clark adjusted her Executive Council, removing Kevin Falcon, George Abbott, Blair Lekstrom, and Mary McNeil who had all announced they would not be standing for re-election; Naomi Yamamoto was also demoted from a ministerial position to a Minister of State. John Yap and Norm Letnick were given ministerial positions for the first time, along with Bill Bennett, Ben Stewart and Moira Stilwell who were former ministers under Gordon Campbell; Ralph Sultan was also promoted to Minister of State. Meanwhile, John van Dongen left the BC Conservative Party and John Slater withdrew from the BC Liberal Party, both to sit as independents.

The legislature re-convened in February 2013 with a new Lieutenant-Governor, Judith Guichon. The PST Transitional Provisions and Amendments Act, which set rules regarding the April 1 transition from the HST to the PST systems, received royal assent on February 28. Fifteen new pieces of legislation were adopted, including the Tla'amin Final Agreement Act regarding the Sliammon First Nation, the Seniors Advocate Act which created a Seniors Advocate office to advise the government on systemic challenges faced by people over the age of 65 and the Destination BC Corp. Act which created Destination BC to replace Tourism BC. Amendments to the Community Charter and the Vancouver Charter enabled local governments to issue tax notices electronically. The Community Safety Act established the office of Community Safety which can investigate, based on a public complaint, suspected illegal activities occurring on a property.

The 5th Session adjourned on March 14, 2013 and the 39th Parliament was formally dissolved by the Lieutenant-Governor on April 16, 2013.

== Members of the 39th Parliament ==
Member	Party	Electoral district	First elected / previously elected	Term number
John van Dongen	Liberal (to March 26, 2012)	Abbotsford South	1995	5
John van Dongen	Independent Conservative	Abbotsford South	1995	5
John van Dongen	Independent (from September 22, 2012)	Abbotsford South	1995	5
Mike de Jong	Liberal	Abbotsford West	1994	5
Randy Hawes	Liberal	Abbotsford-Mission	2001	3
Scott Fraser	NDP	Alberni-Pacific Rim	2005	2
John Slater	Liberal (to January 14, 2013)	Boundary-Similkameen	2009	1
John Slater	Independent (from January 14, 2013)	Boundary-Similkameen	2009	1
Kathy Corrigan	NDP	Burnaby-Deer Lake	2009	1
Raj Chouhan	NDP	Burnaby-Edmonds	2005	2
Harry Bloy	Liberal	Burnaby-Lougheed	2001	3
Richard Lee	Liberal	Burnaby North	2001	3
Donna Barnett	Liberal	Cariboo-Chilcotin	2009	1
Bob Simpson	NDP (to October 7, 2010)	Cariboo North	2005	2
Bob Simpson	Independent	Cariboo North	2005	2
John Les	Liberal	Chilliwack	2001	3
Barry Penner (to January 9, 2012)	Liberal	Chilliwack-Hope	1996	4
Gwen O'Mahony (from April 19, 2012)	NDP	Chilliwack-Hope	2012	1
Norm Macdonald	NDP	Columbia River-Revelstoke	2005	2
Don McRae	Liberal	Comox Valley	2009	1
Douglas Horne	Liberal	Coquitlam-Burke Mountain	2009	1
Diane Thorne	NDP	Coquitlam-Maillardville	2005	2
Bill Routley	NDP	Cowichan Valley	2009	1
Guy Gentner	NDP	Delta North	2005	2
Vicki Huntington	Independent	Delta South	2009	1
Maurine Karagianis	NDP	Esquimalt-Royal Roads	2005	2
Rich Coleman	Liberal	Fort Langley-Aldergrove	1996	4
Harry Lali	NDP	Fraser-Nicola	1991, 2005	4*
John Horgan	NDP	Juan de Fuca	2005	2
Terry Lake	Liberal	Kamloops-North Thompson	2009	1
Kevin Krueger	Liberal	Kamloops-South Thompson	1996	4
Norm Letnick	Liberal	Kelowna-Lake Country	2009	1
Steve Thomson	Liberal	Kelowna-Mission	2009	1
Bill Bennett	Liberal (to November 19, 2010)	Kootenay East	2001	3
Bill Bennett	Independent (Liberal)	Kootenay East	2001	3
Bill Bennett	Liberal (from April 5, 2011)	Kootenay East	2001	3
Katrine Conroy	NDP	Kootenay West	2005	2
Mary Polak	Liberal	Langley	2005	2
Marc Dalton	Liberal	Maple Ridge-Mission	2009	1
Michael Sather	NDP	Maple Ridge-Pitt Meadows	2005	2
Leonard Krog	NDP	Nanaimo	1991, (Note: Parksville-Qualicum) 2005	4*
Doug Routley	NDP	Nanaimo-North Cowichan	2005	2
John Rustad	Liberal	Nechako Lakes	2005	2
Michelle Mungall	NDP	Nelson-Creston	2009	1
Dawn Black	NDP	New Westminster	2009	1
Gary Coons	NDP	North Coast	2005	2
Claire Trevena	NDP	North Island	2005	2
Naomi Yamamoto	Liberal	North Vancouver-Lonsdale	2009	1
Jane Thornthwaite	Liberal	North Vancouver-Seymour	2009	1
Ida Chong	Liberal	Oak Bay-Gordon Head	1996	4
Ron Cantelon	Liberal	Parksville-Qualicum	2005	2
Pat Pimm	Liberal (to June 28, 2011)	Peace River North	2009	1
Pat Pimm	Independent (Liberal)	Peace River North	2009	1
Pat Pimm	Liberal (from July 13, 2011)	Peace River North	2009	1
Blair Lekstrom	Liberal (to June 11, 2010)	Peace River South	2001	3
Blair Lekstrom	Independent (Liberal)	Peace River South	2001	3
Blair Lekstrom	Liberal (from March 2, 2011)	Peace River South	2001	3
Bill Barisoff†	Liberal	Penticton	1996	4
Mike Farnworth	NDP	Port Coquitlam	1991, 2005	4*
Iain Black (to October 3, 2011)	Liberal	Port Moody-Coquitlam	2005	2
Joe Trasolini (from April 19, 2012)	NDP	Port Moody-Coquitlam	2012	1
Nicholas Simons	NDP	Powell River-Sunshine Coast	2005	2
Pat Bell	Liberal	Prince George-Mackenzie	2001	3
Shirley Bond	Liberal	Prince George-Valemount	2001	3
Rob Howard	Liberal	Richmond Centre	2009	1
Linda Reid	Liberal	Richmond East	1991	5
John Yap	Liberal	Richmond-Steveston	2005	2
Murray Coell	Liberal	Saanich North and the Islands	1996	4
Lana Popham	NDP	Saanich South	2009	1
George Abbott	Liberal	Shuswap	1996	4
Robin Austin	NDP	Skeena	2005	2
Doug Donaldson	NDP	Stikine	2009	1
Kevin Falcon	Liberal	Surrey-Cloverdale	2001	3
Jagrup Brar	NDP	Surrey-Fleetwood	2004	3
Sue Hammell	NDP	Surrey-Green Timbers	1991, 2005	4*
Harry Bains	NDP	Surrey-Newton	2005	2
Stephanie Cadieux	Liberal	Surrey-Panorama	2009	1
Dave Hayer	Liberal	Surrey-Tynehead	2001	3
Bruce Ralston	NDP	Surrey-Whalley	2005	2
Gordon Hogg	Liberal	Surrey-White Rock	1997	4
Margaret MacDiarmid	Liberal	Vancouver-Fairview	2009	1
Mary McNeil	Liberal	Vancouver-False Creek	2009	1
Kash Heed	Liberal	Vancouver-Fraserview	2009	1
Shane Simpson	NDP	Vancouver-Hastings	2005	2
Mable Elmore	NDP	Vancouver-Kensington	2009	1
Adrian Dix	NDP	Vancouver-Kingsway	2005	2
Moira Stilwell	Liberal	Vancouver-Langara	2009	1
Jenny Kwan	NDP	Vancouver-Mount Pleasant	1996	4
Gordon Campbell (to March 15, 2011)	Liberal	Vancouver-Point Grey	1994	5
Christy Clark (from May 11, 2011)	Liberal	Vancouver-Point Grey	1996, (Note: Port Moody-Burnaby Mountain) 2011	3*
Colin Hansen	Liberal	Vancouver-Quilchena	1996	4
Spencer Chandra Herbert	NDP	Vancouver-West End	2008	2
Eric Foster	Liberal	Vernon-Monashee	2009	1
Carole James	NDP	Victoria-Beacon Hill	2005	2
Rob Fleming	NDP	Victoria-Swan Lake	2005	2
Ralph Sultan	Liberal	West Vancouver-Capilano	2001	3
Joan McIntyre	Liberal	West Vancouver-Sea to Sky	2005	2
Ben Stewart	Liberal	Westside-Kelowna	2009	1

== Party standings of the 39th Parliament ==
=== Seating plan ===
Legislative Chamber

=== Standings changes ===
Number of members per party by date	2009	2010			2011							2012				2013
Number of members per party by date	May 12	Jun 11	Oct 7	Nov 19	Mar 2	Mar 15	Apr 5	May 11	Jun 28	Jul 13	Oct 3	Jan 1	Mar 26	Apr 19	Sep 22	Jan 14
Liberal	49	48		47	48	47	48	49	48	49	48	47	46			45
NDP	35		34											36		
Independent (Conservative)	0												1		0	
Independent	1	2	3	4	3		2		3	2					3	4
Total members	85						84	85			84	83		85		
Vacant	0						1	0			1	2		0		
Government Majority	13	11		9	11	10	12	13	11	13	12	11	9	7		5

Membership changes in the 39th Parliament
Date	Name	District	Party	Reason
May 12, 2009	See List of Members			Election day of the 39th general election
June 11, 2010	Blair Lekstrom	Peace River South	Independent	Resigned from cabinet and the Liberal caucus because of the Harmonized Sales Tax.
October 7, 2010	Bob Simpson	Cariboo North	Independent	Removed from caucus for public dissent regarding NDP leader Carole James
November 19, 2010	Bill Bennett	Kootenay East	Independent	Removed from caucus for public dissent regarding Liberal leader Gordon Campbell
March 2, 2011	Blair Lekstrom	Peace River South	Liberal	Rejoined the Liberal caucus
March 15, 2011	Gordon Campbell	Vancouver-Point Grey	Liberal	Vacated seat
April 5, 2011	Bill Bennett	Kootenay East	Liberal	Rejoined the Liberal caucus
May 11, 2011	Christy Clark	Vancouver-Point Grey	Liberal	Won by-election
June 28, 2011	Pat Pimm	Peace River North	Independent	Resigned from the Liberal caucus after being arrested after a domestic dispute
July 13, 2011	Pat Pimm	Peace River North	Liberal	Allowed back into Liberal caucus after chargers were dropped.
October 3, 2011	Iain Black	Port Moody-Coquitlam	Liberal	Vacated seat
January 1, 2012	Barry Penner	Chilliwack-Hope	Liberal	Vacated seat
March 26, 2012	John van Dongen	Abbotsford South	Independent (Conservative)	Withdrew his membership with the BC Liberal Party over concerns regarding party leader Christy Clark. He joined the BC Conservative Party but sat as an Independent.
April 19, 2012	Joe Trasolini	Port Moody-Coquitlam	(NDP)	Won by-election
April 19, 2012	Gwen O'Mahony	Chilliwack-Hope	(NDP)	Won by-election
September 22, 2012	John van Dongen	Abbotsford South	Independent	Withdrew his membership with the BC Conservative Party over concerns regarding party leader John Cummins.
January 14, 2013	John Slater	Boundary-Similkameen	Independent	Quit the BC Liberals after being denied re-nomination for 2013 general election.

=== Regional breakdown ===
After 2009 election
Affiliation	Lower Mainland			Interior		Vancouver Island
Affiliation	Vancouver	Metro Vancouver*	Fraser Valley	Southern Interior	North	Vancouver Island
Liberal Party	6	15	8	10	6	4
New Democratic Party	5	11	1	4	4	10
Independent	0	1	0	0	0	0
Total	11	27	9	14	10	14

- Excluding City of Vancouver but including Sunshine Coast

Current totals
Affiliation	Lower Mainland	Fraser Valley	Interior	North	Vancouver Island
Liberal Party	20	6	9	6	4
New Democratic Party	17	2	4	3	10
Independent	1	1	1	1	0
Total	38	9	14	10	14

== Premier change ==
After facing declining poll numbers, a recall campaign over introduction of the Harmonized Sales Tax and a possible caucus revolt, Liberal Premier Gordon Campbell decided to step down as Premier and initiate a leadership campaign in his party.

Former Liberal MLA Christy Clark was elected as leader and sworn into office on March 14, 2011 appointing a new cabinet. Gordon Campbell resigned his seat for the riding of Vancouver-Point Grey on March 15, which Christy Clark won in a by-election on May 11.
