= Claire Trevena =

Canadian politician (born 1962)

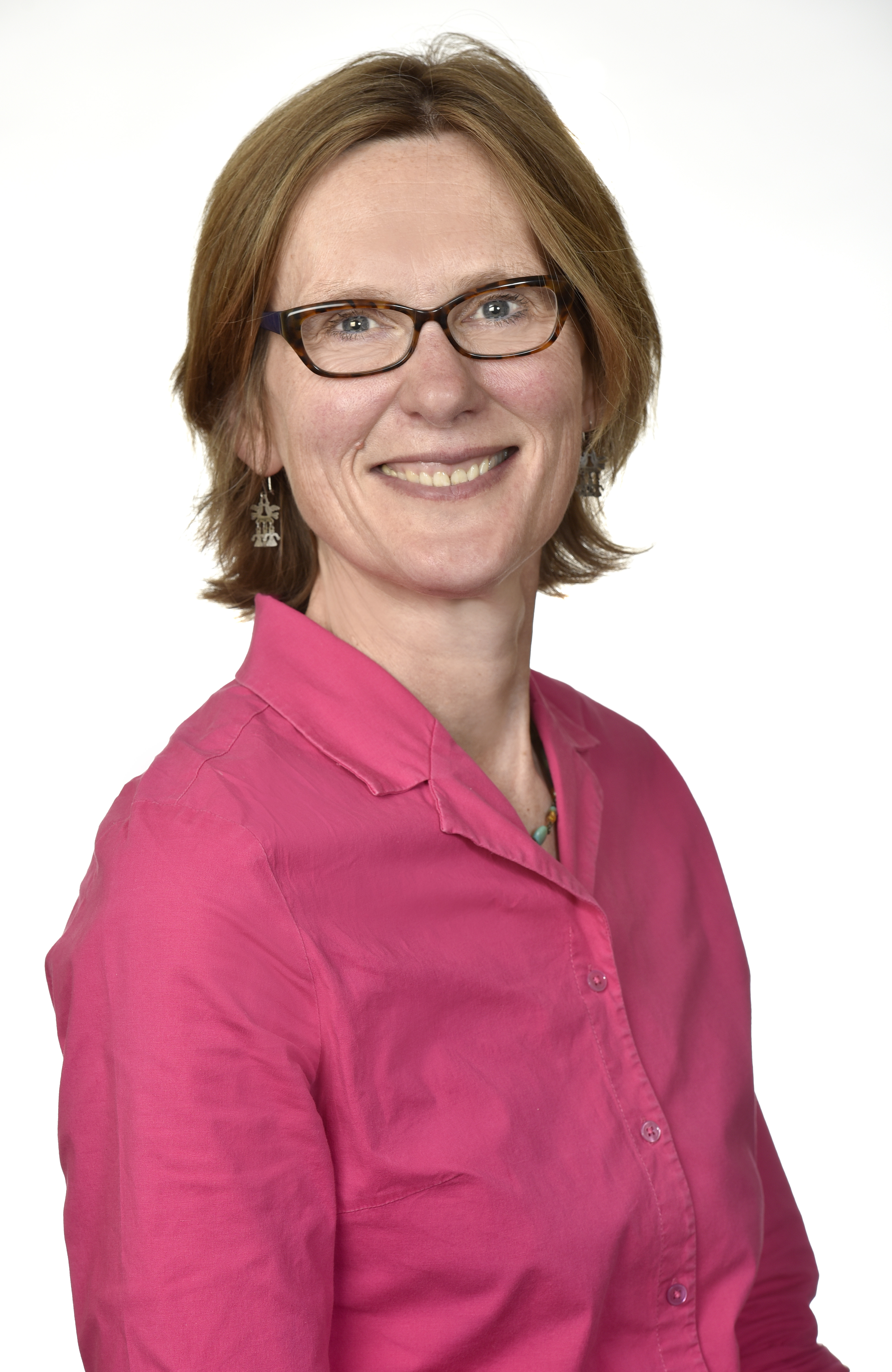

Minister of Transportation and Infrastructure of British Columbia
- In office July 18, 2017 – November 26, 2020
- Premier: John Horgan
- Preceded by: Todd Stone
- Succeeded by: Rob Fleming

Member of the British Columbia Legislative Assembly for North Island
- In office May 17, 2005 – October 24, 2020
- Preceded by: Rod Visser
- Succeeded by: Michele Babchuk

Personal details
- Born: May 26, 1962 (age 64)
- Party: New Democrat
- Spouse: Mike McIvor
- Profession: Journalist, communications business owner

Claire Felicity Trevena (born May 26, 1962) is a Canadian politician, who represented the North Island electoral district Legislative Assembly of British Columbia from 2005 to 2020. During the 41st Parliament (2017-2020) she was appointed to the Executive Council to be the Minister of Transportation and Infrastructure. She is a member of the British Columbia New Democratic Party and was first elected as a Member of the Legislative Assembly in the 2005 election and re-elected in the 2009, 2013 and 2017 elections. In the 38th Parliament of British Columbia, she sat on the Special Committee on Sustainable Aquaculture and the Select Standing Committee on Public Accounts, as well as serving as the opposition critic on the Employment and Income Assistance ministry, followed by the critic on child care, early childhood development, and women's issues. In the 39th Parliament she acted as a deputy speaker before returning to her role as critic on the children and family development portfolio. In the 40th Parliament, she was the critic on transportation and BC Ferries and, in that role, produced a report comparing the BC Ferries system with the Washington State Ferries system and introduced the Provincial Shipbuilding Act in both 2014 and 2015 seeking to have future ferries constructed in Canada.

Originally from England, Trevena has a background in journalism having worked as a Canadian correspondent for British media. After she immigrated, she worked for the Canadian Broadcasting Corporation and then as a public information officer for the Organization for Security and Co-operation in Europe. After moving to British Columbia with her husband, she started her own business specializing communication strategies. She unsuccessfully filed a complaint with the British Columbia Human Rights Tribunal after being fired from a job because of her political affiliation. She was an advocate of renovations to the hospitals in Campbell River and Comox, opposing the health authority's plans to replace them with a new regional hospital near Courtenay. In November 2010, Trevena was one of thirteen party members to ask for a leadership convention, resulting in the resignation of Carole James as leader of the BC NDP. She endorsed John Horgan in both the 2011 and 2014 leadership elections.

== Background ==
Trevena was raised in a town in Northern England. She worked as an editor for the BBC World Service and came to Canada, in 1993, as a Canadian correspondent for the BBC and other British media outlets. She eventually went to work for CBC Newsworld International in Toronto and became a Canadian citizen. At the same time, in the late-1990s, she worked for a strategic communications firm. Between 1999 and 2004, she was involved with the United Nations and the Organization for Security and Co-operation in Europe as a public information officer for their missions in the Balkans. In 2003, she was awarded a Canadian Peacekeeping Service Medal (Civilian) for her efforts in Macedonia.

With her husband, Mike McIvor, she moved to British Columbia and settled on Quadra Island where they started their own business, Start Communicating Strategies. She was hired in 2003 by the BC government as the communications director of the Citizens' Assembly on Electoral Reform. When the assembly chair discovered she had joined the Green Party of British Columbia she was fired on the belief, as a party member, she would not be able to perform with the political neutrality the job demanded. Trevena filed a complaint with the British Columbia Human Rights Tribunal claiming she was being discriminated against due to her political beliefs. In April 2004, the tribunal sided in favour of Citizens' Assembly.

In September 2004, with the British Columbia New Democratic Party starting their nomination process for the up-coming provincial elections, Trevena put her name forward as a candidate. Brian Giles (a former assistant to Attorney General of British Columbia Colin Gabelmann) and Comox-Strathcona Regional District director Brenda Leigh were also nominated. Giles withdrew in February 2005 and Gabelmann endorsed Trevena. Leigh, a Campbell River citizen, was endorsed by former-MLA Glenn Robertson and focused her campaign in the urban areas and with labour organizations. Trevena campaigned more in the rural areas and with environmental groups. She won the nomination with 53% of the vote. Shortly afterwards, campaigning for the 38th Provincial General Election began where she faced the incumbent MLA BC Liberal Party Rod Visser, Discovery Islander publisher and Green Party candidate Philip Stone, Democratic Reform BC and Port McNeill town councillor Dan Cooper, and Independent candidate and Campbell River logger Lorne Scott. Trevena won the North Island riding in the May 17 election, with 45% of the vote, with her victory being attributed to a strong grassroots campaign that focused on the islands and rural areas, while her main opponent, Vissar, won majorities in Campbell River, Port Hardy and Port McNeill.

== Provincial politics ==
=== 38th Parliament ===
In the 38th Parliament of British Columbia the BC NDP, with Trevena, formed the Official Opposition. She was selected for the bi-partisan Special Committee on Sustainable Aquaculture to deliver recommendations on the development of fish farms in BC. NDP leader Carole James assigned Trevena to be the official critic to the Employment and Income Assistance ministry, headed by BC Liberal Claude Richmond. She supported the 2005 review of welfare rates in which she advocated for earning exemptions and opposed the ministry providing welfare recipients with "free socks, T-shirts and travel mugs" in exchange for authorizing direct deposits of welfare cheques into a bank account. She chastised Richmond after an internal survey of ministry employees reported very morale and revealed he was ignoring staff recommendations. On local issues, Trevena lobbied the government to intervene in the bankruptcy of a Port Alice pulp mill. While the mill was 87 years old at the time and required equipment upgrades and environmental remediation, it also comprised 80% of Port Alice's tax base and was one of only a few mills in the world that produced specialty products using dissolving sulphite pulp; the province eventually directed $800,000 to Port Alice to cover the loss of the 2005 property taxes, facilitated the sale of the mill to a Swiss investment company for $1, and provided $7.5 million for site remediation. When another mill was facing closure (Elk Falls sawmill in February 2008), Minister of Forests Rich Coleman declined to offer provincial assistance but recognized Trevena for her efforts helping keep the Port Alice mill open. Trevena backed the creation of the North Coast Trail through Cape Scott Provincial Park, but opposed efforts at developing private accommodations in the park. During the debate over whether the Vancouver Island Health Authority should build a new hospital or renovate existing facilities in Campbell River and Comox, Trevena campaigned in support of renovating the existing hospitals. When the Health Authority chose to build a new $306-million, 230-bed facility near Courtenay instead, Trevena lobbied Minister of Health George Abbott not to approve the decision, and continued to publicly campaign in support of the renovations. She delivered an 18,775 signature petition to the Legislative Assembly requesting Abbott to not approve the Health Authority's plan; the Health Authority eventually relented and upgraded the two smaller hospitals.

In July 2006, Carol James reassigned Trevena to be critic of child care, early childhood development, and women's issues. In 2007, Trevena lobbied against budget cuts to child care programs by Minister of State for Child Care Linda Reid; after significant opposition some cuts were restored later in the year. Trevena spoke out against a Ministry of Children and Family Development project to use MLA offices belonging exclusively to BC Liberal Party members to distribute 2,000 free automobile booster seats for children at public events. Trevena and party leader Carol James travelled the province hosting open houses regarding women's issues; they advocated for the "restoration of funding for women's centres" and the "reinstatement of cancelled victims' services programs". On local issues, Trevena criticized the split of the Comox-Strathcona Regional District into two separate regional districts as being "sudden and arbitrary decision" by the Minister of Community Affairs Ida Chong made without public consultation; Trevena backed the CSRD request for a one-year delay which was denied. After Trevena complained about the lack of provincial spending on highways and roads in her constituency, the Minister of Transportation Kevin Falcon questioned her ability as an MLA, and she, in return, questioned his abilities as a minister. Beginning in 2008, Trevena sat on the Select Standing Committee on Public Accounts, during the 4th and 5th Parliamentary sessions. In the Spring she again travelled across the province with Carol James, this time discussing child care issues and promoting the party platform which advocates for universal child care.

=== 39th Parliament ===
With the 39th BC general election coming in May 2009, Trevena was acclaimed as the BC NDP candidate in October 2008. The BC Liberals selected former chief of the Kwakiutl First Nation Marion Wright to face Trevena in what was projected to be a competitive race but which Trevena easily won. In the 39th Parliament of British Columbia Trevena became one of two assistant deputy speakers. In that role, she travelled to Kenya to attend a conference for the Commonwealth Parliamentary Association, along with the speaker Bill Barisoff. She joined with fellow NDP MLAs Scott Fraser and Lana Popham, in conjunction with the Western Canada Wilderness Committee, in lobbying for the stop to old-growth logging on Vancouver Island and the Lower Mainland. In the Harmonized Sales Tax debate, Trevena called for the Select Standing Committee on Finance to conduct public consultation across the province but ultimately opposed its implementation on the basis its fewer exemptions compared to Provincial Sales Tax and the increased control the HST would give to the federal government on taxation matters. In November 2010, Trevena emerged as one of thirteen NDP MLAs to call for a leadership convention over the leadership of Carol James. Trevena had been critical of the party a year earlier at a BC NDP convention when she criticized the neglect of the party's "Sustainable BC" vision during the 2009 election but did not publicly come out against James' leadership, as Bob Simpson was removed from caucus in October for public dissent, until Katrine Conroy resigned as caucus whip. After threats of discipline and mediation efforts failed and James resigned, Trevena immediately stated she was not running for the leadership position. Instead, in mid-March 2011, she endorsed John Horgan in the leadership race, though Adrian Dix went on to win. Dix moved Trevena from assistant deputy speaker to opposition critic of children and family development, a role similar to what she held during the 38th Parliament. In this role she responded to an editorial by Mary McNeil, the minister responsible for children and families, calling for the minister to poverty reduction strategy. As the government was considering a fall 2011 election, Trevana was acclaimed the NDP candidate for the North Island riding, though the mid-term election was not called. In 2012 she toured with an NDP forestry committee, along with Bill Routley, Norm Macdonald, and Harry Lali seeking strategies to curtail raw log exports. She subsequently presented the NDP forestry plan later that year, calling for reforestation, restriction to raw log exports, and the re-instatement of a jobs commissioner. She advocated for the Coastal Ferry Amendment Act to include a freeze in the rise of ferry fees and subsequently called fare increases "disgraceful".

=== 40th Parliament ===
In the 40th BC general election Trevena was considered the front runner in her riding with Simon Fraser University postgraduate student Nick Facey of the BC Liberals and retired Campbell River resident Bob Bray challenging her. However, Trevena's party lost the general election and again formed the official opposition. Party leader Adrian Dix appointed Trevena to the role of critic of transportation and BC Ferries. Following announcements of BC Ferries route cuts and fare increases and a scandal involving executive bonus payouts, Trevena initiated in a well-received comparison review of the BC Ferries system with Washington State Ferries system. Also in this critic role, she criticized fellow MLA Jordan Sturdy for not delivering a petition from his constituents on Bowen Island to the legislature regarding ferry cuts. In May 2014 Trevena introduced a private member bill (Bill M-213) titled Provincial Shipbuilding Act, 2014 which would have required new public transportation vessels, like ferries, be constructed in Canada and that the procurement process give weight to bids that demonstrate direct economic benefits to B.C. and that utilize union contractors. The bill was not advanced beyond first reading and, later that year, Trevena was critical of the Premier for agreeing to build new ferries in Poland despite an election promise to create a shipbuilding industry in B.C. Trevena introduced the same bill again (Bill M-211) in May 2015 but again it was not advanced beyond the first reading. Trevena endorsed Horgan to be leader of the BC NDP in the 2014 leadership election, as she had done in 2011 election. After Horgan became leader he kept Trevena as the opposition critic on transportation.

=== 41st Parliament ===
In the 41st BC general election, Trevena was challenged by Dallas Smith of the Kwakwaka'wakw First Nations for the BC Liberals, Sue Moen for the Green Party, and former BC Refederation Party party leader John Twigg for the BC First Party. Trevena was again re-elected with her party forming the Official Opposition, but this time in a BC Liberal minority government. However, in the first session of the 41st Parliament the BC Liberal government lost a confidence vote and the second session began with the BC NDP forming a minority government. In July 2017, Premier John Horgan appointed Trevena Minister of Transportation and Infrastructure. In her mandate letter, she was charged with eliminating tolls on the Port Mann and Golden Ears Bridges, and reviewing BC Ferries to freeze user fees and bring ferry ship-building back to British Columbia. Among other reforms, the 2017-18 government review of coastal ferry service operated by the independently managed BC Ferries led to Trevena introducing the Coastal Ferry Amendment Act, 2019 which adds that the BC Ferry Authority must consider the public's interest in safe, reliable and affordable service in addition to the other factors. Also in that ministerial role, Trevena led the government's introduction of the Passenger Transportation Amendment Act, 2018 to allow all types of vehicle for hire (or ridesharing) companies to operate in British Columbia, the Coastal Ferry Amendment Act, 2019 to add that the BC Ferry Authority must consider the public's interest in safe, reliable and affordable service in addition to the other factors, and the Motor Vehicle Amendment Act, 2020 to add a vehicle driven by a sheriff into this list of emergency vehicles covered by that act. As preparations were being made for a snap election Trevena announced that she would not seek re-election. In the subsequent October 2020 election, her North Island seat was won by Michele Babchuk of the NDP.

== Electoral history ==
2017 British Columbia general election: North Island
Party	Candidate	Votes	%	±%	Expenditures
New Democratic	Claire Trevena	12,355	47.72	−2.98	$48,509
Liberal	Dallas William Smith	9,148	35.33	−6.83	$66,583
Green	Sue Moen	3,846	14.85	–	$2,576
BC First	John M. Twigg	543	2.10	–	$4,490
Total valid votes		25,892	100.00	–	
Total rejected ballots		87	0.34	−0.38	
Turnout		25,979	62.49	+5.21	
Registered voters		41,570			
Source: Elections BC

2013 British Columbia general election: North Island
Party	Candidate	Votes	%	±%	Expenditures
New Democratic	Claire Trevena	11,885	50.70	–1.3	$70,067
Liberal	Nick Facey	9,883	42.16	+3.1	$79,565
Conservative	Bob Bray	1,675	7.14	–	$7,380
Total valid votes		23,443	100.00		
Total rejected ballots		170	0.72		
Turnout		23,613	57.28		
Source: Elections BC

2009 British Columbia general election: North Island
Party	Candidate	Votes	%	±%	Expenditures
New Democratic	Claire Trevena	11,865	52	+7	$80,465
Liberal	Marion Wright	8,937	39	−4	$122,981
Green	Philip Stone	1,670	7	0	$2,716
Independent	William Walter Mewhort	333	1	–	$1,643
Total valid votes		22,805	100		
Total rejected ballots		102	0.5		
Turnout		22,907	57		

2005 British Columbia general election: North Island
Party	Candidate	Votes	%	Expenditures
New Democratic	Claire Trevena	11,464	45	$70,428
Liberal	Rod Visser	10,804	43	$151,219
Green	Philip Stone	1,874	7	$6,554
Democratic Reform	Dan Cooper	699	3	$4,760
Independent	Lorne James Scott	471	2	$456
Total valid votes		25,312	100	
Total rejected ballots		101	0.4	
Turnout		25,413	66	

British Columbia provincial government of John Horgan
Cabinet post (1)
Predecessor	Office	Successor
Todd Stone	Minister of Transportation and Infrastructure; July 18, 2017–	Incumbent
