= Susie Chant =

Canadian politician

The Honourable Susie Chant
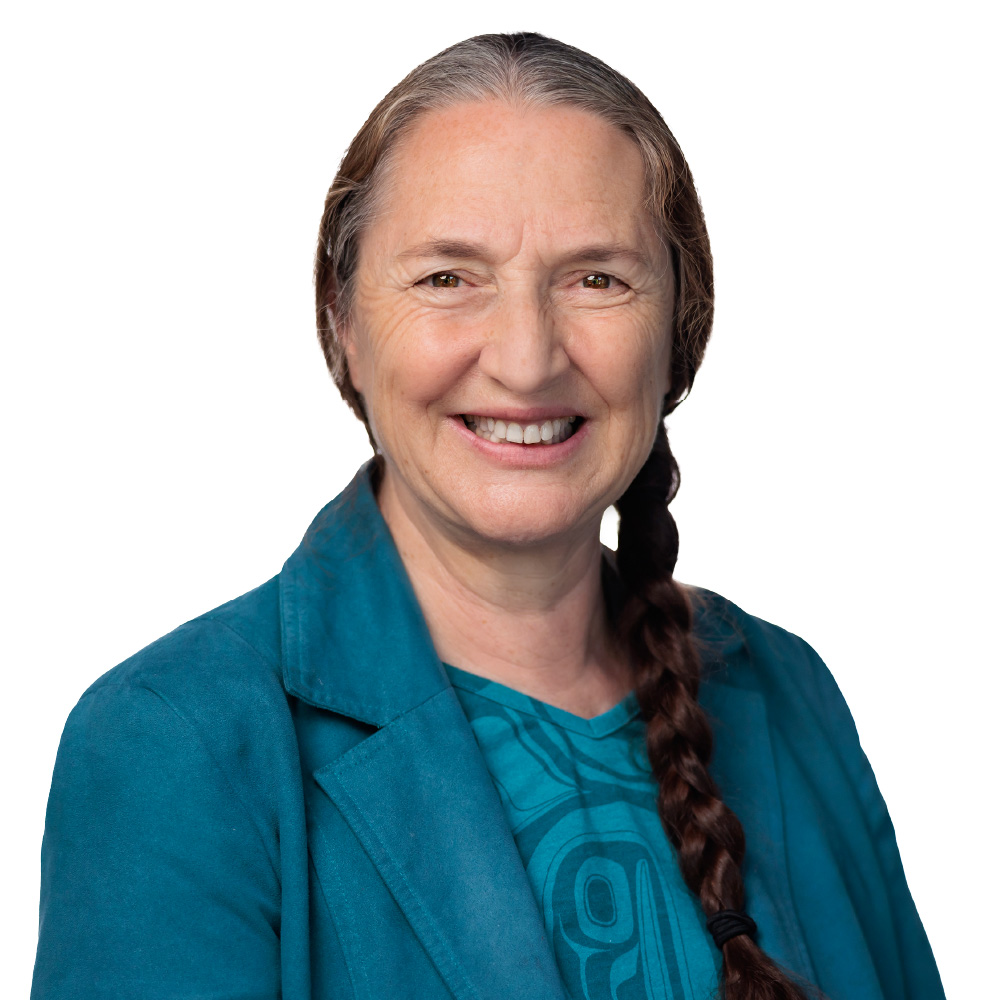
- Campaign portrait, 2024

Parliamentary Secretary for Seniors’ Services and Long-Term Care of British Columbia
- Incumbent
- Assumed office November 18, 2024
- Premier: David Eby
- Preceded by: Harwinder Sandhu

Parliamentary Secretary for Accessibility of British Columbia
- In office December 7, 2022 – November 18, 2024
- Premier: David Eby
- Preceded by: Dan Coulter
- Succeeded by: Dana Lajeunesse

Member of the British Columbia Legislative Assembly for North Vancouver-Seymour
- In office October 24, 2020 – October 24, 2026
- Preceded by: Jane Thornthwaite
- Succeeded by: Lynne Block

Personal details
- Party: New Democratic
- Spouse: Rick Chant
- Children: 2

Military service
- Allegiance: Canada
- Branch: Royal Canadian Navy (reserve)
- Years of service: c. 1982–2022
- Rank: Chief petty officer, 2nd class
- Unit: HMCS Discovery

Susie Chant is a Canadian politician, health care worker, and retired navy reserve member who served as a member of the Legislative Assembly of British Columbia (MLA) representing the electoral district of North Vancouver-Seymour from 2020 to 2026. She is a member of the New Democratic Party.

== Early career and education ==
Chant worked as a registered nurse in community care with Vancouver Coastal Health prior to her election to the legislature. During her first year in office, she continued working as a nurse to assist with the COVID-19 pandemic response, including administering vaccines.

Her nursing career also included international work, such as teaching nursing students in Saipan, Northern Mariana Islands and working in children’s psychiatry in Hawaii.

In addition to her health care career, Chant served for more than 40 years in the Royal Canadian Navy Reserves, remaining active in the reserves during part of her time in office until her retirement in 2022.

== Political career ==
Chant was elected to the Legislative Assembly of British Columbia during the 2020 general election as the MLA for North Vancouver-Seymour.

She has served on several legislative committees, including:

- Select Standing Committee on Agriculture, Fish, and Food
- Select Standing Committee on Children and Youth
- Select Standing Committee on Health
- Special Committee to Review the Freedom of Information and Protection of Privacy Act

She previously served as Parliamentary Secretary for Accessibility and, since 2024, has served as Parliamentary Secretary for Seniors’ Services and Long-Term Care. She is also the MLA responsible for British Columbia’s Consular Corps.

Chant was reelected in the 2024 general election. She continued to serve as MLA until the snap 2026 election, where she was defeated by Conservative candidate Lynne Block. Block was the incumbent MLA for West Vancouver-Capilano who was moved into Chants riding to run against her.

== Personal life ==
Chant and her husband have two adult daughters and served as foster parents for 12 years.

She has been active in community organizations, including long-term involvement with the Girl Guides of Canada as a member and former leader. She has also served as a Sun Run clinic leader for 25 years, promoting physical activity in her community.

Her husband, Rick, operates a home-based business repairing and maintaining augmentative technology for people with significant disabilities.

== Electoral history ==
2026 British Columbia general election: North Vancouver-Seymour
Party	Candidate	Votes	%	±%	Expenditures
Conservative	Lynne Block	12,291	46.67	+10.88	
New Democratic	Susie Chant	9,825	37.31	-15.46	
Green	Ben Holt	2,825	10.73	+5.12	
CentreBC	Lori Climenhaga	1,314	4.99	-	
OneBC	~~Frederick Thiele~~	–	–	–	
Total valid votes		26,255	99.70		
Total rejected ballots		79	0.30		
Turnout					
Registered voters					
Conservative gain from New Democratic		Swing		+13.17	
Source: Elections BC
Note: OneBC nominee Frederick Thiele withdrew from the race, but his name will remain on the ballot as ballot printing had already begun at the time of his withdrawal. Election officials will inform voters at voting places that Thiele has withdrawn as a candidate.

2024 British Columbia general election: North Vancouver-Seymour
Party	Candidate	Votes	%	±%	Expenditures
New Democratic	Susie Chant	16,210	52.77	+5.4	$53,561.11
Conservative	Sam Chandola	10,995	35.79	–	$20,303.81
Independent	Mitchell Baker	1,794	5.84	–	$12,743.00
Green	Subhadarshi Tripathy	1,722	5.61	-10.6	$0.00
Total valid votes/expense limit		30,721	99.87	–	$71,700.08
Total rejected ballots		39	0.13	–	
Turnout		30,760	66.64	–	
Registered voters		46,159			
New Democratic notional hold		Swing		-15.2	
Source: Elections BC

2020 British Columbia general election: North Vancouver-Seymour
Party	Candidate	Votes	%	±%	Expenditures
New Democratic	Susie Chant	12,891	46.84	+12.37	$26,969.51
Liberal	Jane Thornthwaite	9,827	35.70	–10.66	$41,813.24
Green	Harrison Johnston	4,514	16.40	–1.90	$5,098.28
Libertarian	Clayton Welwood	291	1.06	+0.19	$46.80
Total valid votes		27,523	99.32	–	
Total rejected ballots		189	0.68	+0.21	
Turnout		27,712	65.49	–4.85	
Registered voters		42,316			
New Democratic gain from Liberal		Swing		+11.52	
Source: Elections BC
