= Jane Thornthwaite =

Canadian politician and activist

Jane Thornthwaite MLA
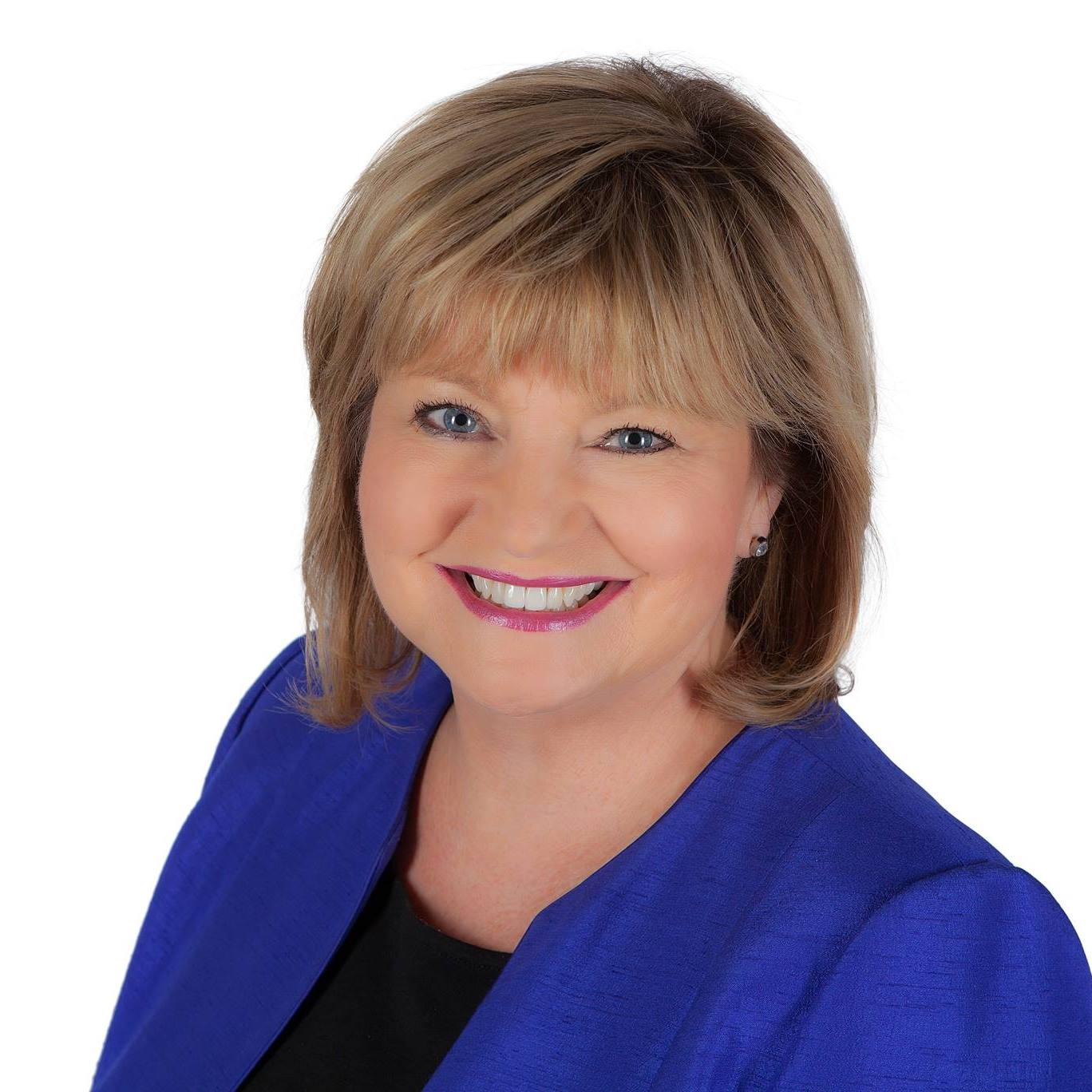

Member of the British Columbia Legislative Assembly for North Vancouver-Seymour
- In office May 12, 2009 – September 21, 2020
- Preceded by: Daniel Jarvis
- Succeeded by: Susie Chant

Personal details
- Born: 1958 or 1959 (age 67–68)
- Party: BC Liberal
- Occupation: Politician, dietitian, activist

Jane Ann Thornthwaite is a Canadian politician, who represented the North Vancouver-Seymour electoral district Legislative Assembly of British Columbia from 2009 to 2020. She is a member of the British Columbia Liberal Party and was first elected as a Member of the Legislative Assembly in the 2009 election and re-elected in the 2013 and 2017 elections. Her party formed a majority government during the 39th and 40th Parliaments during which she was appointed to be Parliamentary Secretary for Student Support and Parent Engagement (2012–17). Her party briefly formed a minority government in the 41st Parliament during which she was appointed as the Parliamentary Secretary for Child Mental Health and Anti-Bullying (2017) but became the critic for issues relating to Mental Health and Addictions when she became part of the official opposition.

She sponsored three private member's bills: Bill M-214 in 2012 that would have established standards of care for pet breeders, which while it was not adopted, a version was included in a 2017 amendment to the Prevention of Cruelty to Animals Act; the Safe Care Act (2018) that would have given parents and case workers the power to have children dealing with issues of mental health, substance abuse and sexual exploitation held involuntarily for up to 30 days for assessment and to create a care plan; and the Welfare Payment System Reflection Act that would have required the Minister responsible to prepare a report on alternative payment processing methods for individuals receiving assistance.

Prior to her election to the legislature, Thornthwaite worked as a Registered Dietitian Nutritionist for her own consulting business. She was an advocate for labelling foods that contain genetically modified ingredients. She is a long-time resident of North Vancouver and graduated from Windsor Hillside Secondary School and the University of British Columbia. She was arrested for drunk driving in February 2010 and charged with driving over the legal limit, during the 2010 Winter Olympics. She pled "not guilty" and reached a plea bargain, pleading guilty to "driving without due care and attention".

== Background ==
Thornthwaite was raised in West Vancouver, attending Hillside Secondary School and also in North Vancouver, attending Windsor Secondary School. She graduated from the University of British Columbia with a degree in health education. Prior to her election to the legislature, Thornthwaite worked as a registered dietitian and nutritionist for her own consulting business. According to Thornthwaite, working in that field fostered a sense of advocacy for organic foods and a desire for labelling of food products containing genetically modified ingredients. During that time she raised three children of her own.

=== Local politics ===
In 2005, Thornthwaite stood as an independent in the North Vancouver School District election. She received the most votes, making her one of four candidates elected from the District of North Vancouver. The school board, facing declining enrollments, had to close schools, though there was resistance from the community. Balmoral Junior Secondary School was specifically identified as a school that ought to be closed, though the board refused and kept it open (until 2009) due to public pressure. Thornthwaite, along with another board member, issued a public statement criticizing the board's decision to enter into a public-private partnership to deliver courses specializing in dance, figure skating and other related disciplines. In the November 2008 election, Thornthwaite was the only board member seeking re-election. Entering her second term, Thornthwaite was elected chairperson of the board.

== Provincial politics ==
=== 39th Parliament (2009–2013) ===
In March 2009, long-time Member of the Legislative Assembly Daniel Jarvis suddenly announced his retirement and endorsed Thornthwaite to replace him as a candidate in the upcoming provincial election, a recommendation later supported by the party's election readiness committee. The electoral district was considered one of the safest BC Liberal ridings in the province and the 50-year-old Thornthwaite easily won, with her BC Liberal Party winning a majority government during the 39th Parliament of British Columbia

On February 22, during the 2010 Winter Olympics, Thornthwaite was driving home after attending receptions at the Northern House and Sochi House when at 1 am she was stopped at a road block near the Ironworkers Memorial Second Narrows Crossing. She twice registered a blood alcohol content of 0.11 in road-side breathalyzer tests and was arrested for drunk driving. The next day she issued a public apology stating "Drinking and driving is dangerous and completely unacceptable; I know that and make no excuses for what I did. I know what I did was wrong and I will take full responsibility for my actions." At the trial, Thornthwaite argued that, while she did consume alcohol, she was not intoxicated. The prosecution and defense agreed to a plea bargain requiring Thornthwaite to plead guilty to "driving without due care and attention" in violation of the Motor Vehicle Act, which came with a $500 fine and one-month of community service while allowing Thornthwaite to avoid a criminal record.

=== 40th Parliament (2013–2017) ===
Thornthwaite was re-elected to a second term on May 14, 2013. In the ensuing 40th Parliament of British Columbia she was appointed to the Select Standing Committee for Children and Youth, which she chaired, and the Parliamentary Secretary for Child Mental Health and Anti-Bullying. The Committee released an interim report on youth mental health in B.C., followed by a more comprehensive report with recommendations titled, "Concrete Actions for Systemic Change", in 2016. Many of the recommendations in the report were later adopted by government, including: supporting sexual and gender minority youth in schools through general and targeted programs, appointing a Minister for Mental Health, and Foundry, a collection of integrated, one-stop shop for youth ages 12 to 24 seeking a whole range of health care services, including mental health support, social services, employment services, and drug and alcohol programs. Thornthwaite also assisted in having a North Shore peak named after longtime North Shore Rescue Team Leader, Tim Jones (Search and Rescue).

Thornthwaite was part of a group of elected officials who helped spearhead the Lower Lynn Improvement Project, which saw approval and funding for improvements to interchanges at the North end of the Ironworkers Memorial Second Narrows Crossing. The project was initially to cost $140-million, but increased to $198-million after feedback and consultation with the public determined more infrastructure would result in a better project.

In 2012, Thornthwaite introduced legislation banning puppy mills in British Columbia, Bill M-214, known as the "Standards of Care for Breeders of Companion Animals Act". The bill did not pass initially, but Thornthwaite re-introduced it in 2016 after a government raid rescued 66 mistreated dogs from a puppy mill. The bill passed that April.

=== 41st Parliament (2017–2020) ===
Jane Thornthwaite sought re-election in the 2017 British Columbia general election. She was challenged by NDP candidate Michael Charrois, Green candidate Joshua Johnson, and Libertarian Clayton Welwood, but Thornthwaite sustained the North Vancouver-Seymour riding and her BC Liberal formed a minority government in the 41st Parliament of British Columbia. Premier Christy Clark appointed Thornthwaite to be the 'Parliamentary Secretary for Child Mental Health and Anti-Bullying to the Minister of Children and Family Development' After the BC Liberals lost control of the parliament and the BC NDP formed a minority government, Thornthwaite became the Official Opposition Critic for Mental Health and Addictions. During the ensuing BC Liberal Party leadership election, she endorsed Todd Stone. After Andrew Wilkinson became party leader, he kept Thornthwaite in her role as Critic for Mental Health and Addictions but shifted the position to Critic for Mental Health, Addictions, & Community Wellness in September 2020. In this role, in 2018 and 2019, she introduced the private members' bill Safe Care Act [Bill M-202 (2018), Bill M-207 (2019)] which would have given parents and case workers the power to have children dealing with issues of mental health, substance abuse and sexual exploitation held involuntarily for up to 30 days for assessment and to create a care plan. She also advocated for more treatment and recovery services to be made available in BC. In 2019 she introduced a second private members' bill, the Welfare Payment System Reflection Act (Bill M-208), which would have required the Minister responsible to prepare a report on alternative payment processing methods for individuals receiving assistance.

In addition, Thornthwaite acted as a vocal proponent for bringing ridesharing services, like Uber and Lyft, to the Metro Vancouver region. For some time, Vancouver remained the largest region in North America without ridesharing services. In 2017, Thornthwaite advocated for SkyTrain to be extended to the North Shore. She proposed that the SkyTrain Line be extended across the Burrard Inlet by the Ironworkers Memorial Bridge, and travel east towards Phibbs Exchange, Lonsdale Quay, and Park Royal Shopping Centre in West Vancouver. An SFU sessional instructor and PhD student in the Department of Geography, Stephan Nieweler, released preliminary findings from the work of two fourth-year undergraduate students suggesting that adding a fixed-rail link across the North Shore and, eventually, plugging it into the SkyTrain system across Burrard Inlet would result in more people choosing to get out of their cars and onto transit than either the Surrey-Newton-Guildford line soon to start construction or the contemplated Broadway subway line from Arbutus to UBC. Along with MLA Bowinn Ma, Thornthwaite has also lobbied TransLink for more SeaBus hours, a more equitable fare structure, and more bus service for the North Shore.

Thornthwaite again sought re-election in the 2020 British Columbia general election but lost to Susie Chant of the British Columbia New Democratic Party who went on to form a majority government during the 42nd Parliament of British Columbia.

== Electoral history ==
2020 British Columbia general election: North Vancouver-Seymour
Party	Candidate	Votes	%	±%	Expenditures
New Democratic	Susie Chant	12,891	46.84	+12.37	$26,969.51
Liberal	Jane Thornthwaite	9,827	35.70	–10.66	$41,813.24
Green	Harrison Johnston	4,514	16.40	–1.90	$5,098.28
Libertarian	Clayton Welwood	291	1.06	+0.19	$46.80
Total valid votes		27,523	99.32	–	
Total rejected ballots		189	0.68	+0.21	
Turnout		27,712	65.49	–4.85	
Registered voters		42,316			
New Democratic gain from Liberal		Swing		+11.52	
Source: Elections BC

2017 British Columbia general election: North Vancouver-Seymour
Party	Candidate	Votes	%	±%	Expenditures
Liberal	Jane Thornthwaite	13,194	46.36	−4.56	$59,904
New Democratic	Michael Rene Charrois	9,808	34.47	+1.55	$15,730
Green	Joshua Johnson	5,208	18.30	+10.97	$8,411
Libertarian	Clayton Welwood	247	0.87	–	$115
Total valid votes		28,457	100.00	–	
Total rejected ballots		134	0.47	+0.13	
Turnout		28,591	70.33	+3.34	
Registered voters		40,650			
Source: Elections BC

2013 British Columbia general election: North Vancouver-Seymour
Party	Candidate	Votes	%	±%	Expenditures
Liberal	Jane Thornthwaite	13,186	50.92	–8.26	$111,404
New Democratic	Jim Hanson	8,524	32.92	+5.54	$86,982
Green	Daniel Scott Smith	1,897	7.33	–2.01	$350
Conservative	Brian R. Wilson	1,206	4.66	+0.56	$9,255
Independent	Jaime Alexandra Webbe	1,081	4.17	–	$3,800
Total valid votes		25,894	100.00		
Total rejected ballots		89	0.34		
Turnout		25,983	66.99		
Source: Elections BC

B.C. General Election 2009: North Vancouver-Seymour
Party	Candidate	Votes	%	±	Expenditures
Liberal	Jane Thornthwaite	13,426	59		$57,237
New Democratic	Maureen Norton	6,212	27		$17,589
Green	Daniel Quinn	2,116	9	–	$350
Conservative	Gary Bickling Hee	931	4		$1,186
Total Valid Votes		22,685	100		
Total Rejected Ballots		100	0.4		
Turnout		22,785	61		
