= Jeremy Dalton =

Canadian politician (1942–2005)

Member of the Legislative Assembly of British Columbia for West Vancouver-Capilano
- In office 1991–2001
- Succeeded by: Ralph Sultan

Personal details
- Born: September 22, 1942
- Died: May 28, 2005 (aged 62)
- Party: Independent (2001)
- Other political affiliations: British Columbia Liberal Party (1991-2001)
- Education: University of British Columbia

Jeremy Dalton BA (22 September 1942 – 28 May 2005) was a Canadian politician and lawyer. He was a member of the British Columbia Liberal Party and later an independent. He served as MLA for the riding of West Vancouver-Capilano for two terms after the 1991 and 1996 elections.

== Personal life ==
Before entering politics, Dalton attended the University of British Columbia, graduating with a Bachelor of Arts and a law degree. He also ran a private law practice and taught at Langara College. He was married to Leah Dalton and had three children.

== Political career ==
=== 1991 election ===
He was first elected in the 1991 British Columbia general election for the district of West Vancouver-Capilano, winning a majority of votes, every poll, and the second-highest margin in the province.

While in opposition, Dalton was critic for labour and consumer services early on. He was education critic after that, In the rumblings leading up to the Gordon Wilson-Judi Tyabji scandal, he replaced Gary Farrell-Collins as opposition whip. After Tyabji's sacking as opposition house leader, he was appointed to that position by Liberal Leader Gordon Wilson. Later in 1993 he became critic for attorney-general. While justice critic, Dalton (and most of the Liberal opposition) took the unusual step of supporting NDP attorney-general Colin Gabelmann after the latter admitted to including incorrect information in a court affidavit so as to not have to appear in court. The day after Dalton and the rest of the Liberals reversed their position.

=== 1996 election ===
In the lead-up to the 1996 election, Dalton may have had a harder-than-usual nomination. He eventually became the candidate and was re-elected. His 71.3% of votes was the highest in any riding that election. After that election, he again became labour critic.

=== 1997 conflict of interest case ===
On June 24, 1997, Dalton was forced to resign as labour critic after it was revealed that he wrote a letter to a government bureaucrat regarding an issue he had a financial stake in: a gravel pit under development near a ranch that his wife and father-in-law were part owners of. Liberal leader Gordon Campbell asked the province's conflict of interest commissioner to investigate shortly thereafter after it surfaced that he had written as many as four letters about the same issue, including two to different government cabinet ministers. Dalton later became deputy environment critic after a shadow cabinet shuffle. The commissioner eventually concluded that although it was inappropriate, it was not a conflict of interest because he was acting as a private citizen, and that he should not have been using MLA stationery for personal matters.

== Later career and dismissal ==
Similar affairs would eventually lead to the end of Dalton's political career. The second time was when he used his MLA letterhead in a personal matter, this one involving Handsworth Secondary School, where two of his children were attending. At the time he was deputy education critic and was left a backbencher as a result. The third letter, again about the gravel pit and ranch, resulted in his suspension from caucus for three months. His suspension lasted from April 5, 2000, to July 10, 2000. After returning to caucus, he publicly supported a tunnel being built as a third crossing of Burrard Inlet.

Dalton was permanently dismissed from Liberal caucus and sat as an independent on January 11, 2001. This time it was because he publicly reprimanded two Royal Canadian Mounted Police (RCMP) officers at the scene of an accident. He sat as an independent for the remainder of the term and ran in the 2001 election, but was defeated.

After minor continuing involvement in politics after the 2001 election, Dalton died on May 28, 2005, succumbing to complications following surgery.
