= Rod Visser =

Canadian politician

MLA for North Island
- In office 2001–2005
- Preceded by: Glenn Robertson
- Succeeded by: Claire Trevena

Personal details
- Born: 1964 (age 61–62) Campbell River, British Columbia, Canada
- Party: BC Liberal

Rod Sanderson Visser is a former Canadian politician. Visser served as a BC Liberal Member of the Legislative Assembly of British Columbia from 2001 until his defeat in the 2005 provincial election, representing the riding of North Island.

== Electoral results ==
2001 British Columbia general election: North Island
| Party | Candidate | Votes | % | Expenditures |
|---|---|---|---|---|
| Liberal | Rod Visser | 13,781 | 57.12 | $66,337 |
| New Democratic | Glenn Robertson | 6,375 | 26.42 | $25,939 |
| Green | Ralph Keller | 2,871 | 11.90 | $6,862 |
| Marijuana | Noreen Evers | 1,099 | 4.56 | $1,632 |
| Total valid votes | | 24,126 | 100.00 | |
| Total rejected ballots | | 104 | 0.43 | |
| Turnout | | 24,230 | 73.69 | |

2005 British Columbia general election: North Island
| Party | Candidate | Votes | % | Expenditures |
|---|---|---|---|---|
| New Democratic | Claire Trevena | 11,464 | 45 | $70,428 |
| Liberal | Rod Visser | 10,804 | 43 | $151,219 |
| Green | Philip Stone | 1,874 | 7 | $6,554 |
| Democratic Reform | Dan Cooper | 699 | 3 | $4,760 |
| Independent | Lorne James Scott | 471 | 2 | $456 |
| Total valid votes | | 25,312 | 100 | |
| Total rejected ballots | | 101 | 0.4 | |
| Turnout | | 25,413 | 66 | |
