= North Island (provincial electoral district) =

Provincial electoral district in British Columbia, Canada

British Columbia electoral district
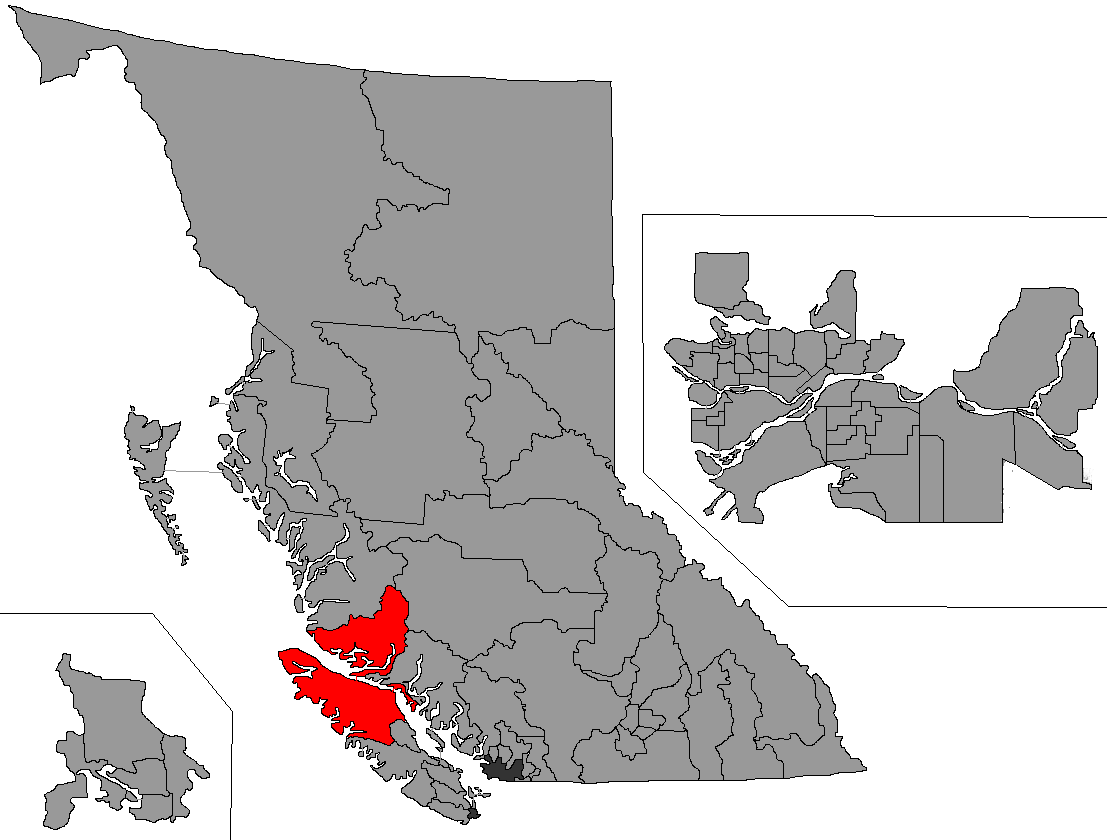
- Coordinates: 50.257°N 126.923°W

Provincial electoral district
- Legislature: Legislative Assembly of British Columbia
MLA
Anna Kindy
Conservative
- First contested: 1991
- Last contested: 2026

Demographics
- Population (2001): 53,657
- Area (km²): 17,393
- Pop. density (per km²): 3.1

North Island is a provincial electoral district for the Legislative Assembly of British Columbia, Canada.

== Demographics ==
Population, 2001	53,657
Population Change, 1996–2001	-5.9%
Area (km^{2})	17,393
Pop. Density (people per km^{2})	3

== Members of the Legislative Assembly ==
The Island's MLA is Anna Kindy. She was first elected in 2024 and represents the British Columbia Conservative Party.

Assembly	Years	Member	Party
32nd	1979–1983	Colin Gabelmann	New Democratic
33rd	1983–1986	Colin Gabelmann	New Democratic
34th	1986–1989	Colin Gabelmann	New Democratic
35th	1991–1996	Colin Gabelmann	New Democratic
36th	1996–2001	Glenn Robertson	New Democratic
37th	2001–2005	Rod Visser	Liberal
38th	2005–2009	Claire Trevena	New Democratic
39th	2009–2013	Claire Trevena	New Democratic
40th	2013–2017	Claire Trevena	New Democratic
41st	2017–2020	Claire Trevena	New Democratic
42nd	2020–2024	Michele Babchuk	New Democratic
43rd	2024–2026	Anna Kindy	Conservative
44th	2026–present	Anna Kindy	Conservative

== Election results ==
2026 British Columbia general election
Party	Candidate	Votes	%	±%	Expenditures
Conservative	Anna Kindy	12,071	47.75	+0.68	
New Democratic	Sara Lopez	10,695	42.31	-2.62	
Green	Benjamin Olsson	2,076	8.21	+0.21	
Independent	Richard Lambert	469	1.63	-	
Total valid votes		25,255	99.91		
Total rejected ballots		24	0.09		
Turnout					
Registered voters					
Conservative hold		Swing		+1.65	
Source: Elections BC

2024 British Columbia general election
Party	Candidate	Votes	%	±%	Expenditures
Conservative	Anna Kindy	14,100	47.07	+41.11	$46,943.40
New Democratic	Michele Babchuk	13,461	44.93	-5.82	$55,132.08
Green	Nic Dedeluk	2,397	8.00	-11.26	$5,654.13
Total valid votes/expense limit		29,958	99.90	–	$71,700.08
Total rejected ballots		31	0.10	–	
Turnout		29,989	62.15	+8.22	
Registered voters		48,249			
Conservative gain from New Democratic		Swing		+23.47	
Source: Elections BC

2020 British Columbia general election
Party	Candidate	Votes	%	±%	Expenditures
New Democratic	Michele Babchuk	12,467	50.75	+3.04	$33,383.20
Liberal	Norm Facey	5,904	24.04	−11.30	$23,983.14
Green	Alexandra Morton	4,731	19.26	+4.41	$12,167.72
Conservative	John Twigg	1,462	5.95	+3.85	$1,324.79
Total valid votes		24,564	99.61	–	
Total rejected ballots		96	0.39	+0.05	
Turnout		24,660	53.93	-8.56	
Registered voters		45,726			
New Democratic hold		Swing		+7.17	
Source: Elections BC

2017 British Columbia general election
Party	Candidate	Votes	%	±%	Expenditures
New Democratic	Claire Trevena	12,355	47.72	−2.98	$48,509
Liberal	Dallas William Smith	9,148	35.33	−6.83	$66,583
Green	Sue Moen	3,846	14.85	–	$2,576
BC First	John M. Twigg	543	2.10	–	$4,490
Total valid votes		25,892	100.00	–	
Total rejected ballots		87	0.34	−0.38	
Turnout		25,979	62.49	+5.21	
Registered voters		41,570			
Source: Elections BC

2013 British Columbia general election
Party	Candidate	Votes	%	±%	Expenditures
New Democratic	Claire Trevena	11,885	50.70	–1.3	$70,067
Liberal	Nick Facey	9,883	42.16	+3.1	$79,565
Conservative	Bob Bray	1,675	7.14	–	$7,380
Total valid votes		23,443	100.00		
Total rejected ballots		170	0.72		
Turnout		23,613	57.28		
Source: Elections BC

2009 British Columbia general election
Party	Candidate	Votes	%	±%	Expenditures
New Democratic	Claire Trevena	11,865	52	+7	$80,465
Liberal	Marion Wright	8,937	39	−4	$122,981
Green	Philip Stone	1,670	7	0	$2,716
Independent	William Walter Mewhort	333	1	–	$1,643
Total valid votes		22,805	100		
Total rejected ballots		102	0.5		
Turnout		22,907	57		

2005 British Columbia general election
Party	Candidate	Votes	%	Expenditures
New Democratic	Claire Trevena	11,464	45	$70,428
Liberal	Rod Visser	10,804	43	$151,219
Green	Philip Stone	1,874	7	$6,554
Democratic Reform	Dan Cooper	699	3	$4,760
Independent	Lorne James Scott	471	2	$456
Total valid votes		25,312	100	
Total rejected ballots		101	0.4	
Turnout		25,413	66	

2001 British Columbia general election
Party	Candidate	Votes	%	Expenditures
Liberal	Rod Visser	13,781	57.12	$66,337
New Democratic	Glenn Robertson	6,375	26.42	$25,939
Green	Ralph Keller	2,871	11.90	$6,862
Marijuana	Noreen Evers	1,099	4.56	$1,632
Total valid votes		24,126	100.00	
Total rejected ballots		104	0.43	
Turnout		24,230	73.69	

1996 British Columbia general election
Party	Candidate	Votes	%	Expenditures
New Democratic	Glenn Robertson	8,385	45.80	$41,392
Liberal	Gerry Furney	6,781	37.04	$55,129
Reform	Dave Jackson	1,776	9.70	$9,278
Progressive Democrat	Mark Grenier	887	4.84	$2,098
Green	Don Malcolm	479	2.62	$877
Total valid votes		18,308	100.00	
Total rejected ballots		85	0.46	
Turnout		18,393	69.55	

1991 British Columbia general election
Party	Candidate	Votes	%	Expenditures
New Democratic	Colin Gabelmann	8,427	50.39	$40,033
Liberal	Dan Reynen	5,670	33.91	$4,338
Social Credit	Roger A. McDonell	2,217	13.26	$30,385
Green	Michael Mascall	408	2.44	$142
Total valid votes		16,722	100.00	
Total rejected ballots		287	1.69	
Turnout		17,009	71.06	

== See also ==
- List of British Columbia provincial electoral districts
- Canadian provincial electoral districts
