= North Vancouver-Seymour =

Provincial electoral district in British Columbia, Canada

British Columbia electoral district
- Location in the Lower Mainland

Provincial electoral district
- Legislature: Legislative Assembly of British Columbia
MLA
Lynne Block
Conservative
- First contested: 1991
- Last contested: 2026

Demographics
- Population (2001): 54,404
- Area (km²): 360
- Pop. density (per km²): 151.1
- Census division: Metro Vancouver
- Census subdivision: North Vancouver (district municipality)

North Vancouver-Seymour is a provincial electoral district for the Legislative Assembly of British Columbia, Canada.

== History ==
For most of history, North Vancouver- Seymour had elected centre-right candidates excluding 1972–1975 when the NDP won. The current MLA is Susie Chant, who was elected in the 2020 Provincial Election. Chant's election coincided with an Orange wave that saw prominent BC Liberals defeated, including incumbent Jane Thornthwaite.

== Members of the Legislative Assembly ==
North Vancouver-Seymour
Assembly	Years	Member	Party
Riding created from North Vancouver
28th	1966–1969	Barrie Clark	Liberal
29th	1969–1972	Barrie Clark	Liberal
30th	1972–1975	Colin Gabelmann	New Democratic
31st	1975–1979	Jack Davis	Social Credit
32nd	1979–1983	Jack Davis	Social Credit
33rd	1983–1986	Jack Davis	Social Credit
34th	1986–1991	Jack Davis	Social Credit
35th	1991–1996	Daniel Jarvis	Liberal
36th	1996–2001	Daniel Jarvis	Liberal
37th	2001–2005	Daniel Jarvis	Liberal
38th	2005–2009	Daniel Jarvis	Liberal
39th	2009–2013	Jane Thornthwaite	Liberal
40th	2013–2017	Jane Thornthwaite	Liberal
41st	2017–2020	Jane Thornthwaite	Liberal
42nd	2020–2024	Susie Chant	New Democratic
43rd	2024–2026	Susie Chant	New Democratic
44th	2026–present	Lynne Block	Conservative

== Election results ==
2026 British Columbia general election
The 2026 general election will be held on October 24.
Party	Candidate	Votes	%	±%	Expenditures
New Democratic	Susie Chant				
Conservative	Lynne Block				
CentreBC	Lori Climenhaga				
Green	Ben Holt				
Total valid votes					
Total rejected ballots					
Turnout					
Registered voters					
Source: Elections BC

2024 British Columbia general election
Party	Candidate	Votes	%	±%	Expenditures
New Democratic	Susie Chant	16,210	52.77	+5.4	$53,561.11
Conservative	Sam Chandola	10,995	35.79	–	$20,303.81
Independent	Mitchell Baker	1,794	5.84	–	$12,743.00
Green	Subhadarshi Tripathy	1,722	5.61	-10.6	$0.00
Total valid votes/expense limit		30,721	99.87	–	$71,700.08
Total rejected ballots		39	0.13	–	
Turnout		30,760	66.64	–	
Registered voters		46,159			
New Democratic notional hold		Swing		-15.2	
Source: Elections BC

2020 provincial election redistributed results
Party	%
New Democratic	47.4
Liberal	35.4
Green	16.2
Libertarian	1.0

2020 British Columbia general election
Party	Candidate	Votes	%	±%	Expenditures
New Democratic	Susie Chant	12,891	46.84	+12.37	$26,969.51
Liberal	Jane Thornthwaite	9,827	35.70	–10.66	$41,813.24
Green	Harrison Johnston	4,514	16.40	–1.90	$5,098.28
Libertarian	Clayton Welwood	291	1.06	+0.19	$46.80
Total valid votes		27,523	99.32	–	
Total rejected ballots		189	0.68	+0.21	
Turnout		27,712	65.49	–4.85	
Registered voters		42,316			
New Democratic gain from Liberal		Swing		+11.52	
Source: Elections BC

2017 British Columbia general election
Party	Candidate	Votes	%	±%	Expenditures
Liberal	Jane Thornthwaite	13,194	46.36	−4.56	$59,904
New Democratic	Michael Rene Charrois	9,808	34.47	+1.55	$15,730
Green	Joshua Johnson	5,208	18.30	+10.97	$8,411
Libertarian	Clayton Welwood	247	0.87	–	$115
Total valid votes		28,457	100.00	–	
Total rejected ballots		134	0.47	+0.13	
Turnout		28,591	70.33	+3.34	
Registered voters		40,650			
Source: Elections BC

2013 British Columbia general election
Party	Candidate	Votes	%	±%	Expenditures
Liberal	Jane Thornthwaite	13,186	50.92	–8.26	$111,404
New Democratic	Jim Hanson	8,524	32.92	+5.54	$86,982
Green	Daniel Scott Smith	1,897	7.33	–2.01	$350
Conservative	Brian R. Wilson	1,206	4.66	+0.56	$9,255
Independent	Jaime Alexandra Webbe	1,081	4.17	–	$3,800
Total valid votes		25,894	100.00		
Total rejected ballots		89	0.34		
Turnout		25,983	66.99		
Source: Elections BC

B.C. General Election 2009: North Vancouver-Seymour
Party	Candidate	Votes	%	±	Expenditures
Liberal	Jane Thornthwaite	13,426	59.18		$57,237
New Democratic	Maureen Norton	6,212	27.38		$17,589
Green	Daniel Quinn	2,116	9.34	–	$350
Conservative	Gary Bickling Hee	931	4.10		$1,186
Total valid votes		22,685	100%		
Total rejected ballots		100	0.44%		
Turnout		22,785	61.46%		

B.C. General Election 2005: North Vancouver-Seymour
Party	Candidate	Votes	%	±	Expenditures
Liberal	Daniel Jarvis	14,518	56.92%		$55,591
NDP	Cathy Pinsent	7,595	29.78%		$18,913
Green	John Sharpe	3,013	11.81%	–	$1,960
Marijuana	Darin Keith Neal	212	0.83%		$100
Work Less	Christine E. Ellis	169	0.66%	–	$100
Total valid votes		25,507	100%		
Total rejected ballots		110	0.43%		
Turnout		25,617	74.88%		

B.C. General Election 2001: North Vancouver-Seymour
Party	Candidate	Votes	%	±	Expenditures
Liberal	Daniel Jarvis	15,568	65.12%		$26,212
Green	Evelyn Kirkaldy	4,127	17.26%	–	$590
NDP	Sheila Paterson	2,751	11.51%		$4,981
Reform	Ron Gamble	683	2.86%		$6,822
Marijuana	Tom Dreyer	568	2.38%		$721
Independent	Chris McKenzie	209	0.87%		$250
Total valid votes		23,906	100.00%		
Total rejected ballots		94	0.39%		
Turnout		24,000	73.72%		

B.C. General Election 1996: North Vancouver-Seymour
Party	Candidate	Votes	%	±	Expenditures
Liberal	Daniel Jarvis	14,165	56.35%		$26,245
NDP	Michelle Kemper	6,676	26.56%		$14,030
Reform	Caroline Meredith	1,737	6.91%		$15,297
Progressive Democrat	David Massey	1,713	6.81%	–	$2,059
Green	Mark Brooks	645	2.57%	–	$324
Social Credit	Jonn R. Kunickey	105	0.42%	–	$8,221
Libertarian	Bill Tomlinson	54	0.21%		$100
Natural Law	Deborah Rubin	44	0.18%		$133
Total valid votes		25,139	100.00%		
Total rejected ballots		85	0.34%		
Turnout		25,224	76.63%		

B.C. General Election 1991: North Vancouver-Seymour
Party	Candidate	Votes	%	±	Expenditures
Liberal	Daniel Jarvis	12,120	50.84%		$12,138
NDP	Dominique Roelants	7,126	29.89%		$25,273
Social Credit	Gordon Frampton	4,304	18.06%	–	$22,050
Green	Donald Rennie	205	0.86%	–	
Libertarian	Bill Tomlinson	84	0.35%		
Total valid votes		23,839	100.00%		
Total rejected ballots		283	1.17%		
Turnout		24,122	79.49%		

== See also ==
- Vancouver (electoral districts)
- List of British Columbia provincial electoral districts
- Canadian provincial electoral districts
