= Barrie Clark =

Canadian politician and broadcaster (1932–2018)

Barrie Aird Clark

MLA for North Vancouver-Seymour
- In office 1966–1972
- Succeeded by: Colin Gabelmann

Personal details
- Born: November 27, 1932 New Westminster, British Columbia
- Died: March 16, 2018 (aged 85)
- Party: Liberal Party of British Columbia
- Occupation: broadcaster and politician

Barrie Aird Clark (November 27, 1932 – March 16, 2018) was a Canadian politician and broadcaster.

He began his broadcasting career in 1949 in Kelowna, and served brief stints in Ontario and London, England before settling in Vancouver. He was a popular radio personality and parlayed his popularity into politics, beginning in 1963 as an alderman in the District of North Vancouver.

In 1966 Clark was elected to the B.C. Legislative Assembly as a Liberal in the riding of North Vancouver-Seymour, and was re-elected in 1969. He was defeated by Colin Gabelmann in the 1972 election. The following year he was appointed B.C.'s first Rentalsman by Premier Dave Barrett; he served in that position until 1976.

Clark then returned to radio as a talk show host in Vancouver, and in 1988 he returned to Kelowna to host a show on radio station CKOV. In 1999 he was elected to Kelowna city council and served there until his retirement in 2008.
