= Michele Babchuk =

Canadian politician

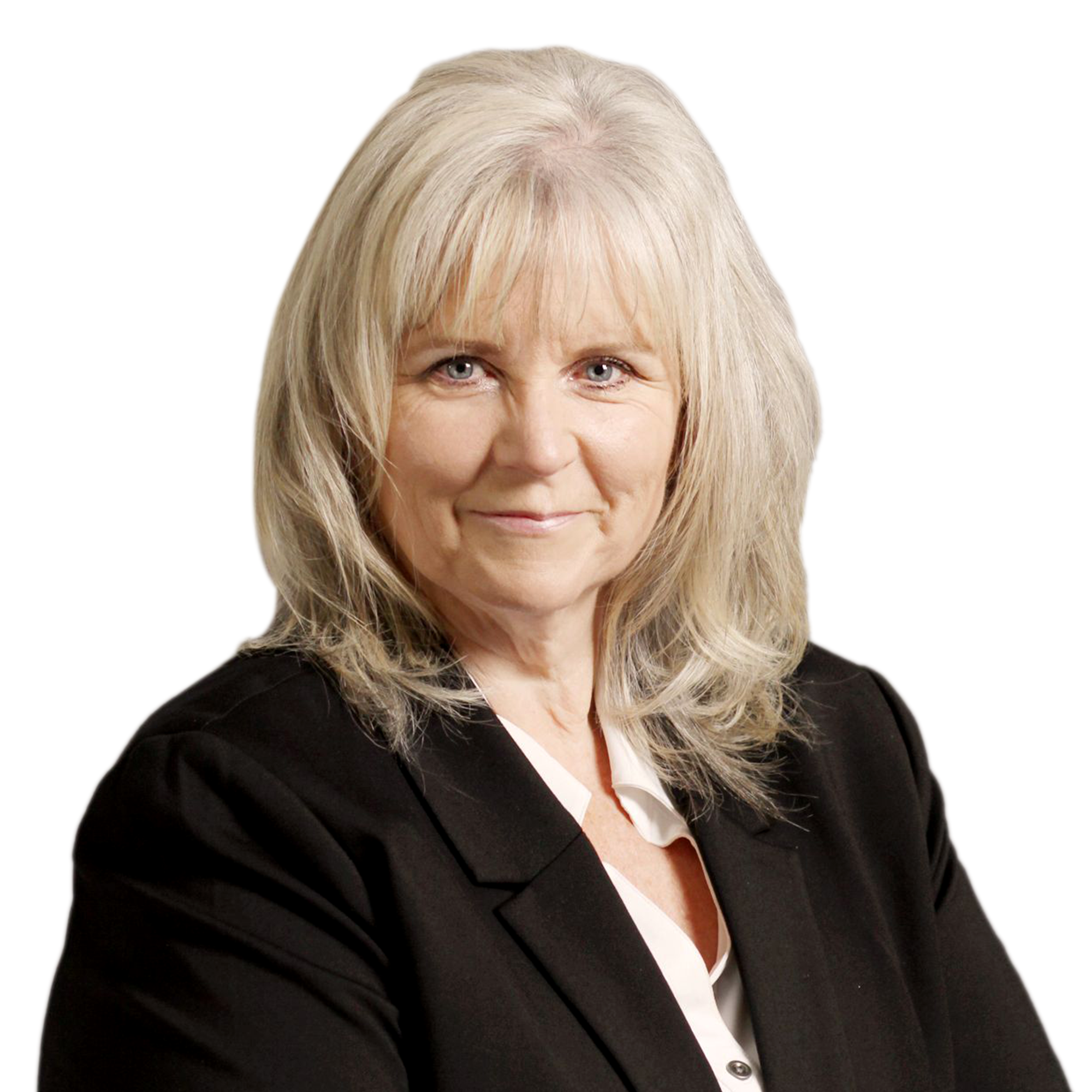

Member of the British Columbia Legislative Assembly for North Island
- In office October 24, 2020 – September 21, 2024
- Preceded by: Claire Trevena
- Succeeded by: Anna Kindy

Personal details
- Party: New Democratic

Michele Babchuk is a Canadian politician who was elected to Legislative Assembly of British Columbia representing the electoral district of North Island as a member of the British Columbia New Democratic Party. She served from 2020 until defeated in the 2024 British Columbia general election.

Prior to her election to the legislature, Babchuk was a city councillor in Campbell River.

== Electoral record ==
2024 British Columbia general election: North Island
Party	Candidate	Votes	%	±%	Expenditures
Conservative	Anna Kindy	14,100	47.07	+41.11	$46,943.40
New Democratic	Michele Babchuk	13,461	44.93	-5.82	$55,132.08
Green	Nic Dedeluk	2,397	8.00	-11.26	$5,654.13
Total valid votes/expense limit		29,958	99.90	–	$71,700.08
Total rejected ballots		31	0.10	–	
Turnout		29,989	62.15	+8.22	
Registered voters		48,249			
Conservative gain from New Democratic		Swing		+23.47	
Source: Elections BC

2020 British Columbia general election: North Island
Party	Candidate	Votes	%	±%	Expenditures
New Democratic	Michele Babchuk	12,467	50.75	+3.04	$33,383.20
Liberal	Norm Facey	5,904	24.04	−11.30	$23,983.14
Green	Alexandra Morton	4,731	19.26	+4.41	$12,167.72
Conservative	John Twigg	1,462	5.95	+3.85	$1,324.79
Total valid votes		24,564	99.61	–	
Total rejected ballots		96	0.39	+0.05	
Turnout		24,660	53.93	-8.56	
Registered voters		45,726			
New Democratic hold		Swing		+7.17	
Source: Elections BC
