= Anna Kindy =

Canadian skier and politician (born 1962)

The Honourable Anna Kindy MLA

Member of the British Columbia Legislative Assembly for North Island
- Incumbent
- Assumed office October 19, 2024
- Preceded by: Michele Babchuk

Minister of State for Rural Development
- Incumbent
- Assumed office November 20, 2026
- Preceded by: Office Established

Personal details
- Born: August 14, 1962 (age 64) Montreal, Quebec, Canada
- Party: BC Conservative
- Education: University of Alberta
- Occupation: physician
- Sports career
- Country: Canada
- Sport: Freestyle skiing

Anna Kindy MLA (born August 14, 1962) is a Canadian politician, physician, former Olympic freestyle skier who has served as a member of the Legislative Assembly of British Columbia (MLA) representing the electoral district of North Island since 2024. She is a member of the Conservative Party. Prior to entering provincial politics, she competed in the women's moguls event at the 1992 Winter Olympics.

== Early life and career ==
Kindy was born in Montreal, Quebec. She graduated from the University of Alberta's medical school in 1986. Early in her career, Kindy worked in remote Quebec contributing to underserved communities. In a unique twist, between 1989-1992, Kindy balanced being a family doctor in Port Hardy while also representing Canada by competing at the 1992 Winter Olympics in Albertville, France, in mogul skiing.

In 1998, Kindy and her husband, Dr. Peter Olesen, a surgeon, moved to Campbell River to work and to raise their three children there. Since then she has gone on international missions in Guatemala and has specialized in addiction medicine. Tenets of her practice include informed consent, doing no harm, and upholding bodily autonomy. Her career in medicine has spanned over 35 years.

At the time of her election to the legislature, she was a general practitioner with a focus on addiction medicine and had hospital privileges at Campbell River Hospital.

== Political career ==
She was nominated as the Conservative Party of BC's candidate on November 9, 2023 for the provincial riding of North Island. She went on to win a seat in the Legislative Assembly of BC on October 19, 2024, defeating NDP incumbent Michele Babchuk by 681 votes. This marked the departure of the North Island riding as a NDP stronghold riding since 2005.

Kindy currently serves in the official opposition's shadow cabinet as the Critic for Health. Her main political priority is to ensure that emergency rooms are open 24/7.

== Political views ==
Despite being vaccinated herself against COVID-19, Kindy has protested against British Columbia's public health measures to combat the pandemic and has questioned the effectiveness of COVID-19 vaccines.

== Electoral history ==
2026 British Columbia general election: North Island
Party	Candidate	Votes	%	±%	Expenditures
Conservative	Anna Kindy	12,812	47.60		
New Democratic	Sara Lopez	11,577	43.01		
Green	Benjamin Olsson	2,132	7.92		
Independent	Richard Lambert	469	1.63	—	
Total valid votes		26,890	99.91		
Total rejected ballots		25	0.09		
Turnout		26,915			
Registered voters					
Conservative hold		Swing		+1.65	
Source: Elections BC

2024 British Columbia general election: North Island
Party	Candidate	Votes	%	±%	Expenditures
Conservative	Anna Kindy	14,100	47.10		
New Democratic	Michele Babchuck	13,461	44.90		
Green	Nic Dedeluk	2,397	8.00		
Total valid votes		29,958	100.00	–	
Total rejected ballots					
Turnout					
Registered voters					
Source: Elections BC
