= Karin Kirkpatrick =

Canadian politician

Leader of CentreBC
- In office March 28, 2025 – June 20, 2026
- Preceded by: Position established
- Succeeded by: Mike Bernier

Member of the British Columbia Legislative Assembly for West Vancouver-Capilano
- In office October 24, 2020 – September 21, 2024
- Preceded by: Ralph Sultan
- Succeeded by: Lynne Block

Personal details
- Party: CentreBC (2025–present)
- Other political affiliations: Liberal/BC United (until 2024); Independent (2024–2025)
- Occupation: Politician

Karin Kirkpatrick is a Canadian politician who served as a member of the Legislative Assembly of British Columbia (MLA) from 2020 to 2024. Elected as a member of the BC Liberal Party (later changing its name to BC United), she represented the electoral district of West Vancouver-Capilano. During her time in the Legislature, she served as the Official Opposition critic for Education, Children and Family Development, and Childcare and served as the Shadow Minister for Housing, Childcare, Autism & Accessibility, Gender Equity & Inclusion.

After running unsuccessfully as an independent candidate in the 2024 general election, Kirkpatrick founded the CentreBC political party after Kevin Falcon refused to resign as the leader of BC United. The party was registered with Elections BC on March 28, 2025.

== Political career ==
On February 8, 2024, Kirkpatrick announced that she would not seek re-election in the 2024 general election. On September 16, she announced that she would re-enter the campaign as an independent, citing disapproval of Kevin Falcon's decision to suspend the BC United campaign and endorse the BC Conservatives. She was defeated by Lynne Block of the Conservative Party in the election.

Following the election, Kirkpatrick founded CentreBC after Falcon refused to resign as leader of BC United. The party was registered with Elections BC on March 28, 2025. Kirkpatrick served as leader of CentreBC until stepping down on June 20, 2026.

== Electoral history ==
2024 British Columbia general election: West Vancouver-Capilano
Party	Candidate	Votes	%	±%	Expenditures
Conservative	Lynne Block	12,050	46.7%	–	
New Democratic	Sara Eftekhar	7,005	27.1%	-3.15	
Independent	Karin Kirkpatrick	5,326	20.6%	-32.95	
Green	Archie Kaario	1,435	5.6%	-9.81	
Total valid votes		25,816	–		
Total rejected ballots					
Turnout					
Registered voters					
Conservative gain from BC United		Swing		–	
Source: Elections BC

2020 British Columbia general election: West Vancouver-Capilano
Party	Candidate	Votes	%	±%	Expenditures
Liberal	Karin Kirkpatrick	12,734	53.55	−3.61	$31,268.43
New Democratic	Amelia Hill	7,194	30.25	+6.62	$4,548.12
Green	Rasoul Narimani	3,664	15.41	−3.80	$9,137.14
Independent	Anton Shendryk	186	0.78	–	$0.00
Total valid votes		23,778	100.00	–	
Total rejected ballots		228	0.95	+0.24	
Turnout		24,006	58.10	–4.46	
Registered voters		41,315			
Liberal hold		Swing		–5.12	
Source: Elections BC
