= Lynne Block =

Canadian politician

The Honourable Lynne Block MLA

Minister of Education and Child Care of British Columbia
- Incumbent
- Assumed office November 20, 2026
- Premier: Lorne Doerkson
- Succeeded by: Lisa Beare

Member of the British Columbia Legislative Assembly
- Incumbent
- Assumed office October 24, 2026
- Preceded by: Susie Chant
- Constituency: North Vancouver-Seymour
- In office October 19, 2024 – October 24, 2026
- Preceded by: Karin Kirkpatrick
- Succeeded by: Caroline Elliott
- Constituency: West Vancouver-Capilano

Personal details
- Born: England
- Party: BC Conservative
- Education: University of British Columbia (MEd)

Lynne Block MLA is a English-Canadian politician who has served as a member of the Legislative Assembly of British Columbia (MLA) since 2024. A member of the Conservative Party, she has represented the electoral district of North Vancouver-Seymour since 2026, having previously represented West Vancouver-Capilano from 2024 to 2026.

== Early life and career ==
Block immigrated to Canada from England as a child and grew up in British Columbia. She attended the University of British Columbia (UBC), where she obtained a Bachelor's degree and later earned a Master's degree in Education Administration.

Her career included teaching, training, and professional development roles at the elementary, secondary, and post-secondary levels. She has received the Prime Minister's Award for Teaching Excellence.

Block co-founded an educational consulting company that focused on research-based learning, corporate social responsibility, and collaborative leadership.

Prior to her election, Block served as a school trustee for the West Vancouver school district.

Block has also been a board member of the North Shore Youth Justice and Family Court Committee, as well as the British Columbia United Nations Representative for Women Educators International. She has held volunteer roles with organizations such as the Canadian Cancer Society, the British Columbia Paraplegic Society, and Violence Against Women In Relationships.

== Political career ==
In the 2024 provincial election, Block was elected as a member of the Legislative Assembly (MLA) for West Vancouver-Capilano, representing the Conservative Party. Following her election as MLA, Block was named to the Conservative shadow cabinet as critic for education.

In the 2026 election, Block was moved out of her West Vancouver-Capilano riding to run in North Vancouver-Seymour. She went on to defeat incumbent New Democratic MLA Susie Chant.

== Electoral history ==
2026 British Columbia general election: North Vancouver-Seymour
Party	Candidate	Votes	%	±%	Expenditures
Conservative	Lynne Block	13,298	46.57		
New Democratic	Susie Chant	10,650	37.30		
Green	Ben Holt	3,105	10.87		
CentreBC	Lori Climenhaga	1,402	4.91	—	
OneBC	~~Frederick Thiele~~	—	–	–	
Total valid votes		28,455	99.65		
Total rejected ballots		100	0.35		
Turnout		28,555			
Registered voters					
Conservative gain from New Democratic		Swing		+13.17	
Source: Elections BC
Note: OneBC nominee Frederick Thiele withdrew from the race, but his name will remain on the ballot as ballot printing had already begun at the time of his withdrawal. Election officials will inform voters at voting places that Thiele has withdrawn as a candidate.

2024 British Columbia general election: West Vancouver-Capilano
Party	Candidate	Votes	%	±%	Expenditures
Conservative	Lynne Block	12,050	46.7%	–	
New Democratic	Sara Eftekhar	7,005	27.1%	-3.15	
Independent	Karin Kirkpatrick	5,326	20.6%	-32.95	
Green	Archie Kaario	1,435	5.6%	-9.81	
Total valid votes		25,816	–		
Total rejected ballots					
Turnout					
Registered voters					
Conservative gain from BC United		Swing		–	
Source: Elections BC

== See also ==
- 43rd Parliament of British Columbia
