= Daniel Jarvis =

Canadian politician (1935–2021)

Member of the British Columbia Legislative Assembly for North Vancouver-Seymour
- In office October 17, 1991 – May 12, 2009
- Preceded by: Jack Davis
- Succeeded by: Jane Thornthwaite

Personal details
- Born: Daniel Morrison Jarvis; November 1, 1935 Vancouver, British Columbia
- Died: June 30, 2021 (aged 85)
- Party: BC Liberal
- Spouse: Dianne
- Children: 2

Daniel Morrison Jarvis was a Canadian politician, who represented the riding of North Vancouver-Seymour in the Legislative Assembly of British Columbia from 1991 until his retirement in 2009. He was a member of the British Columbia Liberal Party.
