= French Bar Creek Provincial Park =

Provincial park in British Columbia, Canada

- IUCN category II (national park)
- Location within British Columbia
- Interactive map of French Bar Creek Provincial Park
- Location: Lillooet Land District, British Columbia, Canada
- Nearest city: Lillooet, BC
- Coordinates: 51°13′29″N 122°12′14″W
- Area: 1,159 ha (2,860 acres)
- Established: May 19, 2010
- Governing body: BC Parks

French Bar Creek Provincial Park is a provincial park in British Columbia, Canada, 60 kilometres north of Lillooet, British Columbia. The park, which is 1159 ha. in size, was established in 2010.
