= Canada's Northern House =

Coordinates: 49°17′09.31″N 123°06′55.87″W

- Established: 2010
- Location: Vancouver, British Columbia, Canada
- Type: Gallery, museum and cultural pavilion

Canada's Northern House was a building operated by the Governments of Nunavut, Canada and Northwest Territories, Canada. Established for the 2010 Olympics and 2010 Paralympics in Vancouver, British Columbia, the house presented the culture, tourism and industry of Canada's North. The house featured informational displays on the arts, mining, and tourism sectors of the two territories. It also featured a large stage for cultural presentations and a visual arts gallery on the lower floor. The house was equipped for film screenings and included retail space which made available authentic items from Nunavut and the Northwest Territories. Canada's Northern House also featured an Inukshuk built by Peter Irniq. The Inukshuk was built using stone from Nunavut, The Northwest Territories and British Columbia.

Canada's Northern House was located at 602 West Hastings Street in Vancouver, British Columbia and was formerly a Toronto Dominion Bank.

The Yukon Territory called Canada's Northern House home during the two weeks of the 2010 Olympic Games and was featured alongside the other two territories.

== Affiliations ==
The house is affiliated with: Government of Nunavut, Government of Northwest Territories, and Government of Yukon.
