= Wills, Estates And Succession Act (British Columbia) =

The Wills, Estates And Succession Act of British Columbia (WESA) is a provincial statute that governs the law of inheritance in British Columbia, Canada.

The bill was introduced in Legislative Assembly of British Columbia on September 24, 2009, and received royal assent on October 29, 2009. WESA amalgamated and in some cases replaced five earlier pieces of legislation. These include: Estate Administration Act RSBC 1996, c. 122, Probate Recognition RSBC 1996, c. 376, Wills Act RSBC 1996, c. 489, Wills Variation Act RSBC 1996, c. Law and Equity Act RSBC 1996, c. 253, s. 46, 49, 50 & 51 and Survivorship and Presumption of Death Act RSBC 1996, c. 444. WESA has given the court curative discretion under Part 5, and in Section 60 allows the court to invalidate and supplant testamentary instruments that are deemed by the court defective as regards proper maintenance and support of the will-maker's spouse or children.

== History ==
Prior to enacting WESA, British Columbia Legislature spent thirty years reviewing the province's estates law. Many of the subsequent changes later introduced under this Act, were initially intended to fill in gaps not previously remedied by orders-in-council. Through the enactment of WESA, the legislature signalled the need to amalgamate sister statutes under a single umbrella. It also brought conformity between BC estates law, and rest of Canada.

Before Justice Elaine Adair on 17 July 2019, Section 60 was employed successfully by Trevor Todd, an estate litigation lawyer, to broaden its mandate; he thereby instructed the court to re-apportion a Sikh estate, in which the original parental will left the lion's share of the farm estate to the sons. Bethany Lindsey, a journalist at CBC, stated that the WESA "gives judges wide leeway to make drastic changes to a will to make sure there's a 'just and equitable' distribution to someone's surviving spouse and children."

== Significant Changes ==
Some of the primary changes under the new WESA regime include the following:

1. Flexible age restrictions: persons over the age of 16 may now devise a legally binding will in the province of British Columbia.
2. Simplified rules of consanguinity: In absence of any heir by the fourth-degree, the entire estate reverts from the deceased to the provincial government and subject to BC Escheat Act
3. Expanded judicial authority: courts may now resort to curative provisions under Section 58 to remedy testamentary instruments that lack prescribed statutory formalities. This may be done through judicial recognition of electronic codicils in digital records such as DVDs and emails. Beneficiaries may invoke this power through an application to the BC Supreme Court.
4. Voidable legacies: gifts to beneficiary witnesses are no longer deemed void prima facie. Beneficiaries may now apply for a judicial recognition of the gift under the court's new expansive powers.

== Curative Provision ==
Prior to relying on its Section 58 powers, the court must be satisfied that instrument in question satisfies the following criteria:

1. evidence pertaining to the testamentary intentions of the deceased;
2. evidence that illustrates the deceased's intention to alter, revoke or revive a testamentary disposition;
3. evidence that illustrates the deceased's intention to alter, revoke or revive a testamentary disposition mentioned in an instrument other than a will.

Upon satisfying the above requirements, the court will then proceed to the following two-step inquiry, as first illustrated in Re Young Estate, 2015 BCSC 182

1. whether document in question is authentic? (this is known as the threshold question)
2. whether the document in question represents the testamentary wishes of the deceased (this is known as the core question)

As stated by Madam Justice Dickson J. in Re Young Estate, 2015 BCSC 182, each inquiry shall be based on "intensely fact-specific considerations".

== Section 60: "adequate, just and equitable" ==
Some of the recent changes heralded under WESA have been considered to impinge upon testamentary freedom. WESA seeks to balance this freedom with the testator's overall moral obligations to society. In Ciarniello v. Ciarniello Estate, 2016 BCSC 1699 Sigurdson J brought to his judgment an earlier BCCA ruling which stated:

the conceptual essence of the statute is to permit judicial interference with testamentary freedom where adequate provision has not been made in respect of a narrow protected class. Testamentary freedom is, therefore, subordinate to the main objective of the [now superseded] Wills Variation Act and must yield, to the extent required, to achieve adequate, just and equitable provision for the applicant spouse and/or children. That said, the judicial approach is not to start " with a blank slate and write a will designed to right all the perceived wrongs of the past, nor interfere only to improve upon the degree of fairness of a will if the testator has met his obligations under the Wills Variation Act ": Chan v Lee (Estate), 2004 BCCA 644 at para. 43.

Sigurdson J further noted, following the leading BC case Tataryn v Tataryn Estate [1994] 2 S.C.R. 807, that

If the phrase 'adequate, just and equitable' is viewed in light of current societal norms, much of the uncertainty disappears...

Following this line of reasoning, BC courts may impinge upon testamentary freedom, or deem it as a secondary purpose under the statute, whenever there is an unaddressed issue concerning the testator's general moral obligations to society, which are interpreted liberally as to equipartition the estate.
