= West Vancouver-Capilano =

Provincial electoral district in British Columbia, Canada

British Columbia electoral district
- Interactive map of riding boundaries

Provincial electoral district
- Legislature: Legislative Assembly of British Columbia
MLA
Caroline Elliott
Conservative
- First contested: 1991
- Last contested: 2026

Demographics
- Population (2021): 62,569
- Area (km²): 81
- Pop. density (per km²): 772.5
- Census division: Metro Vancouver
- Census subdivision(s): West Vancouver, North Vancouver

West Vancouver-Capilano is a provincial electoral district for the Legislative Assembly of British Columbia, Canada, representing parts of both the municipality of West Vancouver, and neighbouring Capilano within the District of North Vancouver collectively.

The riding is the wealthiest constituency in British Columbia, with a median household income of $93,569 according to the 2006 census. In every election from 1991 to 2017, the BC Liberals won this riding with at least 65% of the popular vote, making it one of the safest seats in the province for the party. That number dipped to 53% in the 2020 election.

== Demographics ==
Population, 2021	62,569
Area (km^{2})	81
Pop. Density (people per km^{2})	772
Source: BC Electoral Boundaries Commission

== Geography ==
West Vancouver-Capilano is located on the North Shore. The district comprises most of the District of West Vancouver, together with the Capilano neighbourhood in the western portion of the District of North Vancouver. It extends from the shoreline of Burrard Inlet north into the lower slopes of the North Shore Mountains.

== Members of the Legislative Assembly ==
This riding has elected the following members of the Legislative Assembly:

Assembly	Years	Member	Party
West Vancouver-Capilano; Riding created from North Vancouver-Capilano
35th	1991–1996	Jeremy Dalton	Liberal
36th	1996–2001	Jeremy Dalton	Liberal
36th	2001–2001	Jeremy Dalton	Independent
37th	2001–2005	Ralph Sultan	Liberal
38th	2005–2009	Ralph Sultan	Liberal
39th	2009–2013	Ralph Sultan	Liberal
40th	2013–2017	Ralph Sultan	Liberal
41st	2017–2020	Ralph Sultan	Liberal
42nd	2020–2023	Karin Kirkpatrick	Liberal
42nd	2023–2024	Karin Kirkpatrick	BC United
43rd	2024–2026	Lynne Block	Conservative
44th	2026–present	Caroline Elliott	Conservative

== Election results ==
2026 British Columbia general election
** Preliminary results — Not yet official **
Party	Candidate	Votes	%	±%
Conservative	Caroline Elliott	14,628	66.90	+20.22
New Democratic	Honieh Barzegari	4,493	20.55	-6.59
Green	Arwa Shurab	2,360	10.79	+5.23
OneBC	Naomi Chocyk	386	1.77	
Total valid votes		21,867	99.84	
Total rejected ballots		36	0.16	+0.00
Turnout		21,903		
Registered voters				
Conservative hold		Swing		+13.41
Source: Elections BC

2024 British Columbia general election
Party	Candidate	Votes	%	±%	Expenditures
Conservative	Lynne Block	12,050	46.7%	–	
New Democratic	Sara Eftekhar	7,005	27.1%	-3.15	
Independent	Karin Kirkpatrick	5,326	20.6%	-32.95	
Green	Archie Kaario	1,435	5.6%	-9.81	
Total valid votes		25,816	–		
Total rejected ballots					
Turnout					
Registered voters					
Conservative gain from BC United		Swing		–	
Source: Elections BC

2020 British Columbia general election
Party	Candidate	Votes	%	±%	Expenditures
Liberal	Karin Kirkpatrick	12,734	53.55	−3.61	$31,268.43
New Democratic	Amelia Hill	7,194	30.25	+6.62	$4,548.12
Green	Rasoul Narimani	3,664	15.41	−3.80	$9,137.14
Independent	Anton Shendryk	186	0.78	–	$0.00
Total valid votes		23,778	100.00	–	
Total rejected ballots		228	0.95	+0.24	
Turnout		24,006	58.10	–4.46	
Registered voters		41,315			
Liberal hold		Swing		–5.12	
Source: Elections BC

2017 British Columbia general election
Party	Candidate	Votes	%	±%	Expenditures
Liberal	Ralph Sultan	13,596	57.16	−9.87	$55,842
New Democratic	Mehdi Russel	5,622	23.63	+1.25	$23,564
Green	Michael Markwick	4,570	19.21	–	$6,233
Total valid votes		23,788	100.00	–	
Total rejected ballots		169	0.71	−0.11	
Turnout		23,957	62.56	+2.09	
Registered voters		38,294			
Source: Elections BC

2013 British Columbia general election
Party	Candidate	Votes	%	±%	Expenditures
Liberal	Ralph Sultan	15,776	67.03	-0.45	$96,349
New Democratic	Terry Platt	5,267	22.38	+7.86	$15,266
Conservative	David Jones	1,156	4.91	+1.78	$10,078
Independent	Michael Markwick	1,018	4.32	–	$8,750
Libertarian	Tunya Audain	320	1.36	+0.56	$250
Total valid votes		23,537	100.00		
Total rejected ballots		195	0.82		
Turnout		23,732	60.47		
Source: Elections BC

B.C. General Election 2009: West Vancouver-Capilano
Party	Candidate	Votes	%	±	Expenditures
Liberal	Ralph Sultan	15,292	67.48	-0.79	$92,292
New Democratic	Terry Platt	3,291	14.52	-3.63	$9,647
Green	Ryan Windsor	1,699	7.50	-4.83	$3,975
Independent	David O. Marley	1,489	6.57		$45,103
Conservative	Eddie Petrossian	710	3.13		$14,102
Libertarian	Tunya Audain	182	0.80		$250
Total valid votes		22,663	100		
Total rejected ballots		109	0.48		
Turnout		22,772	57.96		

B.C. General Election 2005: West Vancouver-Capilano
Party	Candidate	Votes	%	±	Expenditures
Liberal	Ralph Sultan	14,665	68.27		$125,045
NDP	Terry Platt	3,900	18.15		$9,903
Green	Lee White	2,648	12.33	–	$1,504
Marijuana	Jodie Joanna Giesz-Ramsay	147	0.68		$100
Work Less	Ben West	122	0.57	–	$100
Total valid votes		21,482	100		
Total rejected ballots		123	0.57		
Turnout		21,605	66.13		

B.C. General Election 2001: West Vancouver-Capilano
Party	Candidate	Votes	%	±	Expenditures
Liberal	Ralph Sultan	15,556	72.69%		$65,001
Green	Nora Gambioli	2,932	13.70%	–	$706
Independent	Jeremy Dalton	1,355	6.33%		$4,258
NDP	Matt Lovick	1,284	6.00%		$1,714
Marijuana	Keith Wiechert	274	1.28%		$792
Total valid votes		21,401	100.00%		
Total rejected ballots		92	0.43%		
Turnout		21,401	72.67%		

B.C. General Election 1996: West Vancouver-Capilano
Party	Candidate	Votes	%	±	Expenditures
Liberal	Jeremy Dalton	16,675	71.29%		$31,949
NDP	Daniel Reeve	3,486	14.90%		$5,688
Reform	Ted Shandro	1,326	5.67%		$8,682
Progressive Democrat	Marina Jurlina	1,182	5.05%	–	$100
Green	Matthew Ferguson	461	1.97%	–	$100
Family Coalition	Jim Kelly	174	0.74%	–	$100
Natural Law	Carolyn Grayson	47	0.20%		$110
Libertarian	Kurt Pokrandt	40	0.17%		
Total valid votes		23,391	100.00%		
Total rejected ballots		196	0.70%		
Turnout		23,587	76.63%		

B.C. General Election 1991: West Vancouver-Capilano
Party	Candidate	Votes	%	±	Expenditures
Liberal	Jeremy Dalton	13,194	56.63%		$14,866
Social Credit	John Reynolds	6,161	26.44%	–	$95,863
NDP	Helen Chaplin	3,740	16.05%		$13,905
Green	Marcia Santen	140	0.60%	–	$100
Libertarian	Tunya Audain	65	0.28%		$20
Total valid votes		23,300	100.00%		
Total rejected ballots		343	1.45%		
Turnout		23,643	78.99%		

== See also ==
- Vancouver (electoral districts)
- List of British Columbia provincial electoral districts
- Canadian provincial electoral districts
