= Tourism British Columbia =

Tourism BC was a government-owned Crown Corporation of the province of British Columbia, Canada. Established as a crown corporation in 1997, its mandate was to promote tourism in the province. It was merged with the now-defunct Ministry of Tourism, Culture and the Arts on April 1, 2010. Today, Tourism BC is a department of the provincial Ministry of Jobs, Tourism and Innovation.
