= Ralph Sultan =

Canadian politician

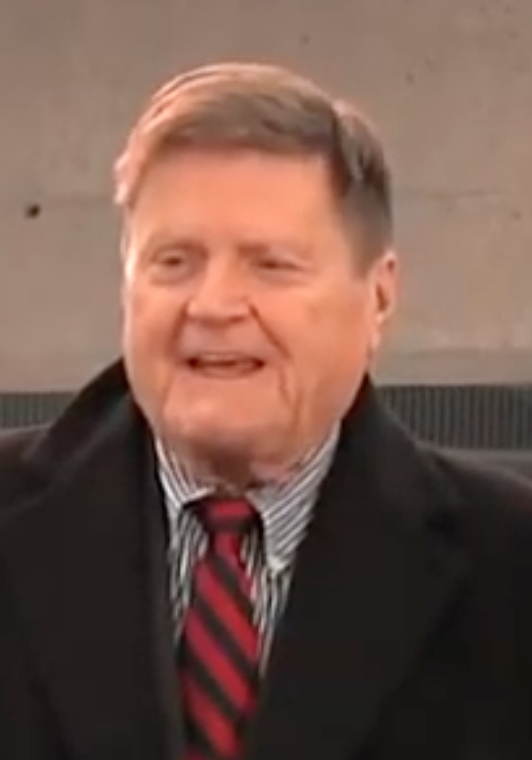
- Sultan in 2013

Member of the British Columbia Legislative Assembly for West Vancouver-Capilano
- In office May 16, 2001 – October 24, 2020
- Preceded by: Jeremy Dalton
- Succeeded by: Karin Kirkpatrick

Personal details
- Born: June 6, 1933 (age 93) Vancouver, British Columbia, Canada
- Party: BC Liberal
- Education: University of British Columbia; Harvard University
- Website: ralphsultan.ca

Ralph Sultan (born June 6, 1933) is a Canadian politician, who was the Member of the Legislative Assembly (MLA) for the community of West Vancouver-Capilano in British Columbia from 2001 to 2020.

A member of the British Columbia Liberal Party, he was first elected in 2001 and re-elected in 2005, 2009, 2013 and 2017. In the election of 2017, he became the oldest person to be elected in the history of B.C. politics at age 83.

Sultan served as Minister of State for Seniors (2012–2013), Minister Responsible for Multiculturalism (2013), and Minister of Advanced Education, Innovation and Technology (2013). He was previously a member of the Select Standing Committee on Public Accounts. He decided to retire rather than run in the 2020 British Columbia general election.

== Electoral record ==
2017 British Columbia general election: West Vancouver-Capilano
Party	Candidate	Votes	%	±%	Expenditures
Liberal	Ralph Sultan	13,596	57.16	−9.87	$55,842
New Democratic	Mehdi Russel	5,622	23.63	+1.25	$23,564
Green	Michael Markwick	4,570	19.21	–	$6,233
Total valid votes		23,788	100.00	–	
Total rejected ballots		169	0.71	−0.11	
Turnout		23,957	62.56	+2.09	
Registered voters		38,294			
Source: Elections BC

2013 British Columbia general election: West Vancouver-Capilano
Party	Candidate	Votes	%	±%	Expenditures
Liberal	Ralph Sultan	15,776	67.03	-0.45	$96,349
New Democratic	Terry Platt	5,267	22.38	+7.86	$15,266
Conservative	David Jones	1,156	4.91	+1.78	$10,078
Independent	Michael Markwick	1,018	4.32	–	$8,750
Libertarian	Tunya Audain	320	1.36	+0.56	$250
Total valid votes		23,537	100.00		
Total rejected ballots		195	0.82		
Turnout		23,732	60.47		
Source: Elections BC
