= Yalakom Provincial Park =

Canadian provincial park

- IUCN category II (national park)
- Location within British Columbia
- Interactive map of Yalakom Provincial Park
- Location: British Columbia, Canada
- Nearest city: Lillooet
- Coordinates: 51°05′23″N 122°25′40″W
- Area: 89.41 km^{2} (34.52 sq mi)
- Established: May 19, 2010
- Governing body: BC Parks

Yalakom Provincial Park is a provincial park in British Columbia, Canada, located 60 kilometres northwest of Lillooet, British Columbia. The park, which is 8941 ha. in size, was established in 2010.
