= Fred Antoine Provincial Park =

Provincial park in British Columbia, Canada

- IUCN category II (national park)
- Location within British Columbia
- Interactive map of Fred Antoine Provincial Park
- Location: Lillooet Land District, British Columbia, Canada
- Nearest city: Lillooet, BC
- Coordinates: 50°54′04″N 122°06′44″W
- Area: 8,230 ha (20,300 acres)
- Established: May 19, 2010
- Governing body: BC Parks

Fred Antoine Provincial Park is a provincial park in British Columbia, Canada, 25 kilometres northwest of Lillooet, British Columbia. The park, which is 2,230 hectares in size, was established in 2010.
