= Gwyneth Lake Provincial Park =

Canadian provincial park

- IUCN category II (national park)
- Location within British Columbia
- Interactive map of Gwyneth Lake Provincial Park
- Location: Lillooet Land District, British Columbia, Canada
- Nearest city: Bralorne, BC
- Coordinates: 50°47′23″N 122°52′31″W
- Area: 132 ha (330 acres)
- Established: May 19, 2010
- Governing body: BC Parks
- Website: bcparks.ca/gwyneth-lake-park/

Gwyneth Lake Provincial Park is a provincial park in British Columbia, Canada, 70 kilometres west of Lillooet, British Columbia. The park, which is 132 ha. in size, was established in 2010.
