= Oregana Creek Provincial Park =

Canadian provincial park

- IUCN category II (national park)
- Location within British Columbia
- Interactive map of Oregana Creek Provincial Park
- Location: British Columbia, Canada
- Nearest city: Avola
- Coordinates: 51°59′09″N 119°05′08″W
- Area: 2.86 km^{2} (1.10 sq mi)
- Established: May 19, 2010
- Governing body: BC Parks

Oregana Creek Provincial Park is a provincial park in British Columbia, Canada, located 150 kilometres northwest of Salmon Arm, British Columbia, near Adams River. The park, which is 286 ha. in size, was established in 2010.
