= Bridge River Delta Provincial Park =

Provincial park in British Columbia, Canada

Coordinates: 50°49′35″N 123°12′18″W

Bridge River Delta Provincial Park is a provincial park in British Columbia, Canada, located 65 kilometres (40 mi) north of Pemberton and 80 kilometres (50 mi) west of Lillooet. Established in 2010, the park covers 992 hectares (2,450 acres).
