= Glenn Robertson =

Canadian politician

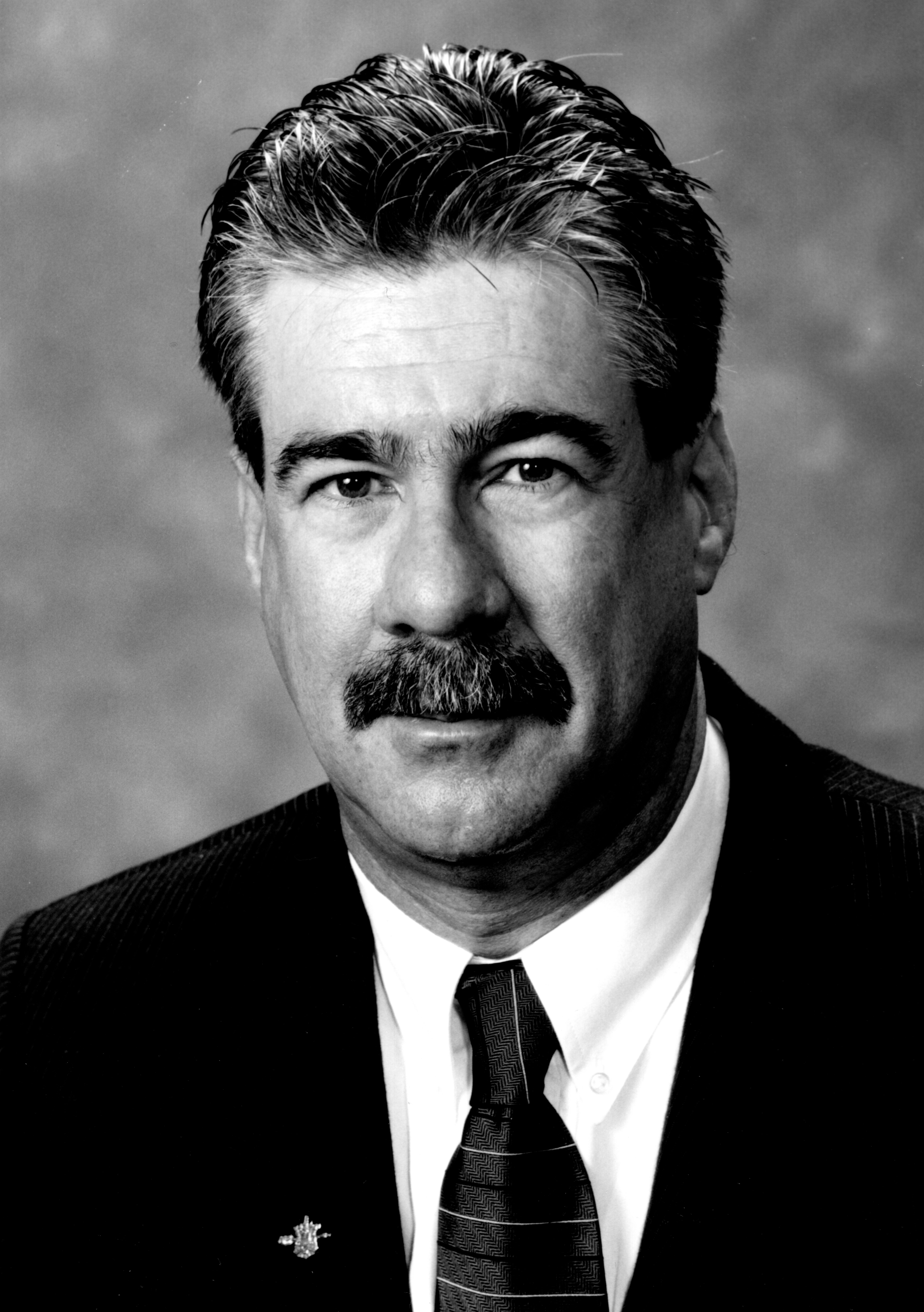

Member of the British Columbia Legislative Assembly for North Island
- In office May 28, 1996 – May 16, 2001
- Preceded by: Colin Gabelmann
- Succeeded by: Rod Visser

Minister of Energy and Mines of British Columbia
- In office November 1, 2000 – June 5, 2001
- Premier: Ujjal Dosanjh
- Preceded by: Dan Miller
- Succeeded by: Richard Neufeld

Personal details
- Born: 1949 or 1950 (age 76–77) Montreal, Quebec
- Party: New Democrat

Glenn Robertson (born 1949 or 1950) is a former Canadian politician, who served as a New Democratic Member of the Legislative Assembly of British Columbia from 1996 to 2001, representing the riding of North Island.

Robertson was born in Montreal and moved to British Columbia in 1973. Before entering politics, he worked in the forest industry for 23 years. Robertson lived in Port McNeill.
