= Colin Gabelmann =

Canadian politician (1944–2026)

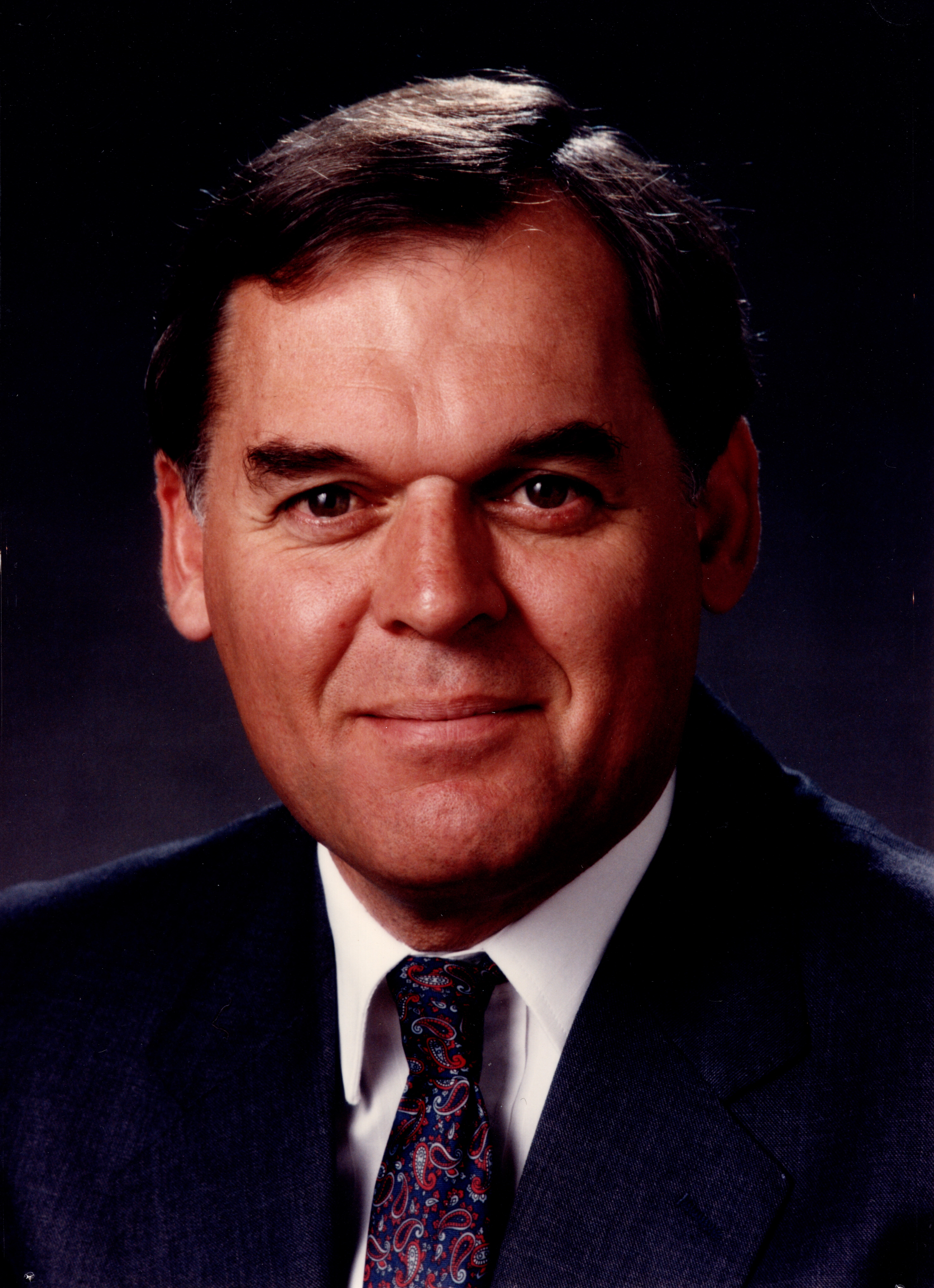
- Gabelmann in 1993

Minister of Government Services and Minister Responsible for Sports of British Columbia
- In office August 16, 1995 – February 22, 1996
- Premier: Mike Harcourt
- Preceded by: Ujjal Dosanjh
- Succeeded by: Positions abolished

Attorney General of British Columbia
- In office November 5, 1991 – August 16, 1995
- Premier: Mike Harcourt
- Preceded by: Russell Fraser
- Succeeded by: Ujjal Dosanjh

Member of the British Columbia Legislative Assembly for North Island
- In office May 10, 1979 – May 28, 1996
- Preceded by: Riding established
- Succeeded by: Glenn Robertson

Member of the British Columbia Legislative Assembly for North Vancouver-Seymour
- In office August 30, 1972 – December 11, 1975
- Preceded by: Barrie Clark
- Succeeded by: Jack Davis

Personal details
- Born: February 11, 1944 London, England
- Died: October 3, 2026 (aged 82) Campbell River, British Columbia, Canada
- Party: New Democratic
- Spouse: Robin Geary

Colin Stuart Gabelmann (February 11, 1944 – October 3, 2026) was a Canadian politician in British Columbia. He represented North Vancouver-Seymour from 1972 to 1975 and North Island from 1979 to 1996 in the Legislative Assembly of British Columbia as a New Democratic Party (NDP) member, and served as cabinet minister under Premier Mike Harcourt.

== Early life ==
Gabelmann was born in London, England on February 11, 1944, the son of Honora Elsie Puddifoot. They moved to Canada in 1947, and settled in Osoyoos where his grandfather had moved to the year prior. Influenced by his stepfather Fritz Gabelmann, Colin became involved with the Co-operative Commonwealth Federation (CCF) at an early age.

After graduating from Southern Okanagan Secondary School in Oliver, he attended the University of British Columbia before leaving to work as a provincial organizer for the New Democratic Party, which succeeded the CCF. Following the NDP's loss in the 1969 provincial election, he joined the British Columbia Federation of Labour (BCFED) as legislative director.

== Politics ==
In the 1972 provincial election, Gabelmann ran as the NDP candidate in North Vancouver-Seymour, defeating the incumbent Liberal candidate Barrie Clark and Conservative leader Derril Warren to become the riding's member of the Legislative Assembly (MLA). The NDP won power in that election, and Gabelmann served as government whip in the 30th Parliament. After losing to Social Credit candidate Jack Davis in 1975, he returned to the BCFED as political education director.

Gabelmann moved to Campbell River, British Columbia in 1978 with his wife Robin Geary, and returned to the Legislative Assembly in 1979 by winning in the newly established riding of North Island; he was re-elected there in 1983, 1986 and 1991. While the NDP formed the official opposition, Gabelmann served as opposition whip and labour critic. After the NDP returned to power in 1991, he was named to the provincial cabinet as Attorney General by Premier Mike Harcourt. He switched portfolios with Ujjal Dosanjh in August 1995, becoming Minister of Government Services and Minister Responsible for Sports. He was left out of the cabinet after Glen Clark took over as premier in February 1996, and he did not run in that May's provincial election.

== After politics, death ==
After finishing his term as MLA, Gabelmann was named to the board of the Pacific Racing Association in 1997. He also served on the Vancouver Island University board of governors, and was on the board of the John Howard Society of North Island for 18 years.

He died in Campbell River on October 3, 2026, at the age of 82.

== Electoral record ==
1991 British Columbia general election: North Island
Party	Candidate	Votes	%	Expenditures
New Democratic	Colin Gabelmann	8,427	50.39	$40,033
Liberal	Dan Reynen	5,670	33.91	$4,338
Social Credit	Roger A. McDonell	2,217	13.26	$30,385
Green	Michael Mascall	408	2.44	$142
Total valid votes		16,722	100.00	
Total rejected ballots		287	1.69	
Turnout		17,009	71.06	
