= 2009 British Columbia general election =

Canadian provincial election

- May 12, 2009

85 seats of the Legislative Assembly of British Columbia 43 seats were needed for a majority
- Turnout: 50.99% ▼7.2 pp
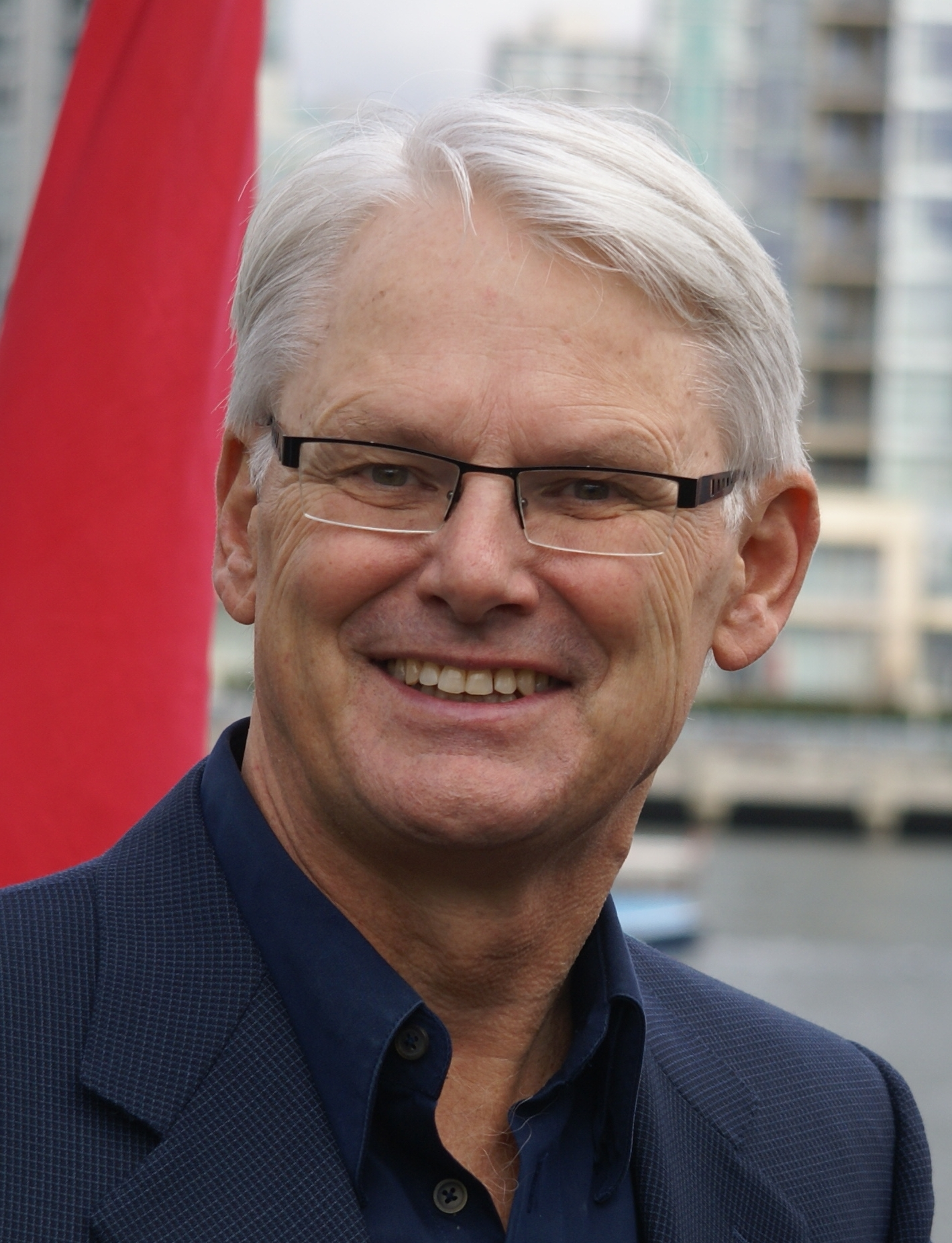

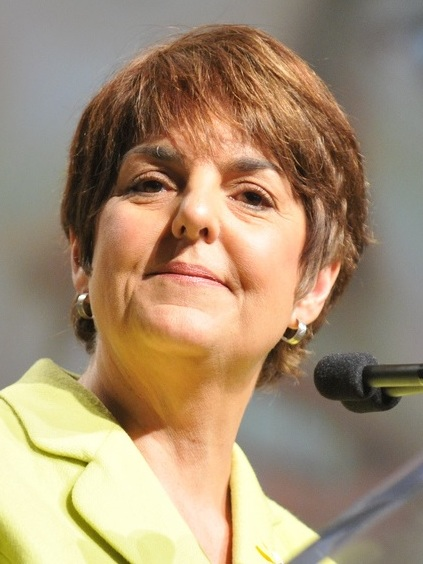

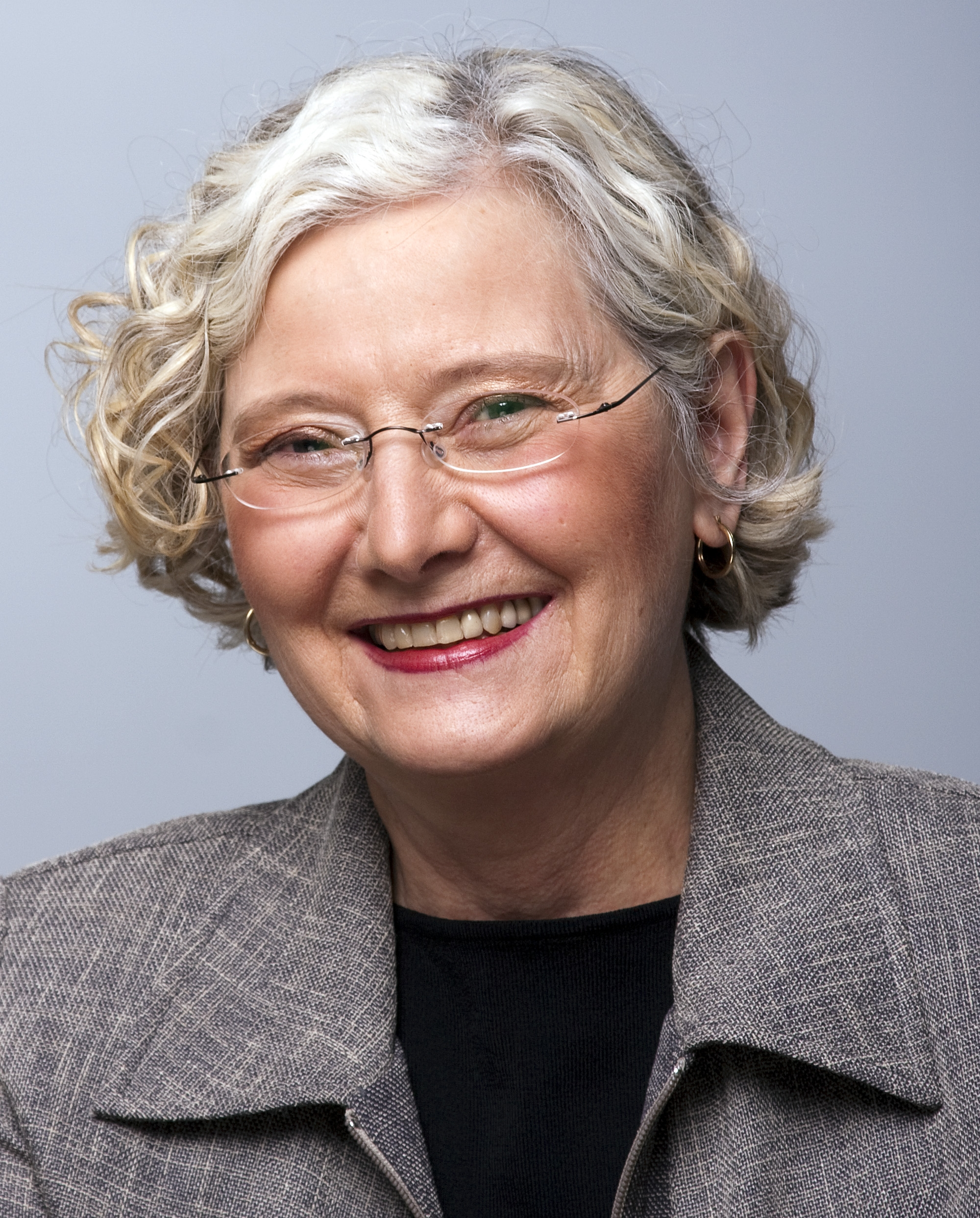
	First party	Second party	Third party
Leader	Gordon Campbell	Carole James	Jane Sterk
Party	Liberal	New Democratic	Green
Leader since	September 11, 1993	November 23, 2003	October 21, 2007
Leader's seat	Vancouver-Point Grey	Victoria-Beacon Hill	Ran in Esquimalt-Royal Roads (Lost)
Last election	46 seats	33 seats	0 seats
Seats won	49	35	0
Seat change	▲3	▲2	Steady
Popular vote	751,661	691,564	134,570
Percentage	45.82%	42.15%	8.21%
Swing	▲0.03%	▲0.62%	▼0.97%
- Popular vote by riding. As this is an FPTP election, seat totals are not determined by popular vote, but instead via results by each riding. Click the map for more details.
Premier before election
Gordon Campbell
Liberal
Premier after election
Gordon Campbell
Liberal

The 2009 British Columbia general election was held on May 12, 2009, to elect members of the Legislative Assembly in the Canadian province of British Columbia. The British Columbia Liberal Party (BC Liberals) formed the government of the province prior to this general election under the leadership of Premier Gordon Campbell. The British Columbia New Democratic Party (BC NDP) under the leadership of Carole James was the Official Opposition.

The election was the first contested on a new electoral map completed in 2008, with the total number of constituencies increased from 79 in the previous legislature to 85. Under amendments to the BC Constitution Act passed in 2001, BC elections are now held on fixed dates which are the second Tuesday in May every four years.

A second referendum on electoral reform was held in conjunction with the election.

The election did not produce a significant change in the province's political landscape. The BC Liberals, who had been in power since the 2001 provincial election, were returned to power, constituting the first time in 23 years a party had won three elections in a row in British Columbia. Polling at the start of the year had shown the Liberals on-track to be returned with an increased majority, but a late shift in voter intentions from the Green Party to the NDP would ultimately lead to a near-repeat of the previous election four years prior. As a result of the seat redistribution, both the Liberals and the New Democrats gained seats, and both parties increased their popular vote by less than one per cent over 2005. Each party lost two incumbent MLAs: the BC NDP's Jenn McGinn and Charlie Wyse, and the Liberals' John Nuraney and Wally Oppal were defeated. All other seat changes in the election resulted from the new seats or from retiring incumbents.

Voter turnout was 50.99% of eligible voters (1,651,567 registered voters).

== 2008 redistribution of ridings ==
An Act was passed in 2008 providing for an increase of seats from 79 to 85, upon the next election. The following changes were made:

Abolished ridings	New ridings
Renaming of districts
Abbotsford-Mount Lehman	Abbotsford West
Alberni-Qualicum	Alberni-Pacific Rim
Bulkley Valley-Stikine	Stikine
Burnaby-Willingdon	Burnaby-Deer Lake
Burquitlam	Burnaby-Lougheed
Cariboo South	Cariboo-Chilcotin
Chilliwack-Kent	Chilliwack-Hope
Chilliwack-Sumas	Chilliwack
East Kootenay	Kootenay East
Esquimalt-Metchosin	Esquimalt-Royal Roads
Kamloops	Kamloops-South Thompson
Malahat-Juan de Fuca	Juan de Fuca
Nanaimo-Parksville	Parksville-Qualicum
Okanagan-Vernon	Vernon-Monashee
Okanagan-Westside	Westside-Kelowna
Penticton-Okanagan Valley	Penticton
Prince George North	Prince George-Mackenzie
Prince George-Mount Robson	Prince George-Valemount
Prince George-Omineca	Nechako Lakes
Surrey-Panorama Ridge	Surrey-Panorama
Victoria-Hillside	Victoria-Swan Lake
West Vancouver-Garibaldi	West Vancouver-Sea to Sky
Drawn from other districts
	Surrey-Fleetwood (Note: From parts of Surrey-Green Timbers, Surrey-Newton and Surrey-Cloverdale.)
Division of districts
Abbotsford-Clayburn	Abbotsford-Mission (Note: Also taking in part of Maple Ridge-Mission.); Abbotsford South
Cowichan-Ladysmith	Cowichan Valley (Note: Also taking in part of Malahat-Juan de Fuca.); Nanaimo-North Cowichan (Note: Also taking in part of Nanaimo.)
Vancouver-Burrard	Vancouver-False Creek (Note: Also taking in part of Vancouver-Fairview.); Vancouver-West End
Reorganization of districts
Port Coquitlam-Burke Mountain; Port Moody-Westwood	Coquitlam-Burke Mountain; Port Coquitlam; Port Moody-Coquitlam
West Kootenay-Boundary; Yale-Lillooet	Boundary-Similkameen; Fraser-Nicola; Kootenay West

== Political parties ==
=== British Columbia Liberal Party ===
Leader: Gordon Campbell

The BC Liberal party dropped from 72 to 46 seats in the legislature after the 2005 provincial election. Having formed a majority government since 2001 the party promoted its own track record as the government. Much of the party's platform was revealed in the 2009 Budget which included a three-year fiscal plan including revenue expectations, tax measures, and spending priorities. The budget proposed cost savings from reduced budgets in half of the ministries, 76% less government advertising, public sector wage freezes, and less spending on government travel costs, contracted professional services, and discretionary spending. The budget plan proposed to increase spending by $4.8 billion over 3 years for healthcare, $300 million over three years for social services, and $800 million more annually for education, as well as some new funding for childcare, policing, victims services, and social housing. The BC Liberal platform, some of it already promised in the budget, advocates hospital improvements in Surrey, Victoria, Vernon, Fort St. John and Kelowna; travel and accommodation assistance to families who must travel long distances to be with their children when they are receiving care; new measures to help remote communities get new access to fresh fruit and vegetables; provide citizens electronic access to their health records; establishing voluntary five-year-old kindergarten classes; establishing a law school at Thompson Rivers University, a medical school at UBC Okanagan, and a Wood Design and Innovation Centre at UNBC; doubling the BC Training Tax Credit; exempting the first $20,000 of seniors' pension income from income tax; legislating a Residents Bill of Rights for seniors living in residential care facilities and a registry for residential care aides; installing cameras to monitor school yards and high-risk public areas; outlaw dumping of raw sewage into the Strait of Juan de Fuca and help build a new sewage treatment plan for Greater Victoria.

=== New Democratic Party of British Columbia ===
Leader: Carole James

Under Carole James' leadership the NDP won 33 seats in the 2005 election and two by-elections in 2008. Among other points, its platform involved repealing the carbon tax, instituting a cap and trade plan of greenhouse gas emissions, adopting California's tough vehicle tailpipe emission standards, expanding the capacity and efficiency of public hospitals, instituting health care wait time guarantees, a 1-year small business tax holiday, freezing post-secondary tuition fees, hire more Crown Prosecutors, restoring public oversight to BC Ferries, restricting raw log exports, increasing the minimum wage to $10/hr indexed to inflation, placing a moratorium on new private run-of-the-river power projects, reinstating the Buy BC program, creating a new Rural Economic Development Fund, and promoting farm gate sales of agricultural products (including meat).

=== Green Party of British Columbia ===
Leader: Jane Sterk

The Green Party ran a full slate of candidates, as it did in 2005 when it won over 9 percent of the vote but no seats in the legislature. Its new leader was Jane Sterk, a former Esquimalt councillor. It supported the BC-STV proposal in the referendum. The party released its platform in a book titled British Columbia's Green Book, 2009—2013. Amongst other points, it advocated balanced budgets, reducing taxes on industry and business while increasing taxes on pollution, creating a Green Venture Capital Fund to invest in green collar jobs, directing 1% from the PST to municipal governments, allowing municipalities to issue municipal bonds, creating a provincial police force, reducing tuition fees by 20%, increasing funding to post-secondary institutions, refunding full tuition fees to graduates who work and live in the province for five years after receiving their degree, banning use of cosmetic pesticides, expanding the Medical Service Plan (to cover chiropractic, physiotherapy, eye exams, massage therapy, routine physical exams, and counselling for addictions), creating a Guaranteed Livable Income by unifying all current income support programs, supporting harm reduction practices, regulating cannabis, halting river-based hydro projects pending a review of the environmental assessment process, re-establishing BC Ferries as a Crown corporation, halting the Gateway Program, using usage based insurance for ICBC rates, and creating a BC Legacy Fund from oil and gas royalties for municipal and rural community projects.

=== Minor parties ===
British Columbia Conservative Party

Leader: Wilf Hanni

The Conservatives nominated 24 candidates, up from seven candidates in 2005 when they won 0.55% of the vote. In spite of his low profile party leader Wilf Hanni participated in a leaders' "Forum" in May 2009. Their platform advocated, among other points, competitive and performance-based healthcare delivery within a publicly funded system, opposing the Recognition and Reconciliation Bill with Aboriginal peoples, returning treaty responsibility to the federal government, repealing the carbon tax and opposing a carbon trading system, expanding resource development (including offshore drilling), reducing the PST by 1%, harmonizing the PST with the Federal GST, eliminating the Property Transfer Tax, rolling back salary increases of MLAs and senior government employees, permitting parents more choices in which schools to send their children to and funding the schools accordingly, repealing the Corren Agreement, reducing tuition fees for students who meet certain standards in post-secondary education, light rail transit in southern Vancouver Island and in Chilliwack, eliminating tolls on bridges (including a proposed toll on the Port Mann Bridge), work requirements on public projects for criminals serving time in jail, a new program to address small crime separately from more serious crimes, creation of a program called Communities That Care to strengthen family dynamics and reduce negative youth behaviors, publishing a Criminal Offenders Registry, creating a substantive appeal process beyond the BC Human Rights Tribunal, enact a 'Right to a Free Vote' legislation for MLAs to freely vote in the Legislature, hold votes for federal senators, and implement a preferential voting system for provincial elections.

British Columbia Libertarian Party

Leader: None

The Libertarian Party ran six candidates in this election, as it did in 2005. The party supported reducing government involvement in delivery of health care, education, and car insurance; reducing taxes as services are privatized; and reducing government regulation on guns and drugs.

British Columbia Marijuana Party

Leader: Marc Emery

The Marijuana Party ran one candidate in this election and endorsed the Green Party. In 2005 it ran 44 candidates, while in 2001 it ran a full slate.

BC Refederation Party

Leader: Mike Summers

The Refederation Party nominated 22 candidates, up from four candidates in 2005 under its previous name the "Western Refederation Party of BC". The party mainly advocates for direct democracy based on the Swiss model, the creation of a provincial constitution, and re-negotiating with the federal government the terms of confederation. According to its website its platform also includes the creation of a provincial police force, homogeneous schools and classes of students with similar abilities, reinstating alternative medical options (such as physiotherapy, dental, and chiropractic) into the Medical Services Plan and placing the Medical Services Plan under the jurisdiction of Insurance Corporation of British Columbia, making WorkSafe an enforcement agency only by moving its insurance component to ICBC, a moratorium on run-of-river hydro projects and fish farms, holding a referendums on the Trade, Investment and Labour Mobility Agreement and the sale of Crown Corporations, and a judicial review of the sale of BC Rail.

Communist Party of British Columbia

Leader: George Gidora

The Communist Party of BC is the provincial branch of the national Communist Party. It had three candidates running in the 2009 election, as it did in 2005. The CPBC campaigned against BC-STV in favour of Mixed Member Proportional representation. It advocates progressive tax based on ability to pay, raising the minimum wage to $16/hour indexed to the cost of living, ending the $6/hour training wage, holding a public inquiry into the sale of BC Rail, banning raw log exports, requiring by legislation the processing of timber locally for export, banning evictions for the purpose of renovation, scrapping the Gateway Program, holding elections for the TransLink board with a $1 single zone fare for the Lower Mainland, removing guns and tasers from transit police, eliminating tuition fees, expanding the apprenticeship program, lowering the voting age to 16, withdrawing from the Trade, Investment and Labour Mobility Agreement, and reintegrating BC Transmission Corporation back into BC Hydro.

Nation Alliance Party

Leader: Wei Ping Chen

The Nation Alliance Party is a new party that nominated two candidates in this election, both in Richmond ridings. The party seeks to promote the rights of ethnic minorities and recent immigrants. Among other points, it advocates promoting participation in the public affairs, promoting non-violence, and opposing racialism.

People's Front

Leader: Charles Boylan

The People's Front is the provincial wing of the Communist Party of Canada (Marxist-Leninist) which generally advocates, among other points, increased spending on health, education and other social programs, a moratorium on the debt, hereditary rights of the Aboriginal peoples, recognition of the equality of all languages and cultures, instituting recall elections, and rights for individuals to initiate legislation. It nominated four candidates in this election, down from five in 2005 and 11 in 2001.

Reform Party of British Columbia

Leader: David Charles Hawkins

The BC Reform Party nominated four candidates. It had only one candidate in the 2005 election but nine in 2001 and a full slate of 75 in the 1996 election. According to its website, its platform includes, amongst other points, replacing the provincial income tax with a sales tax and a business tax on gross receipts, use of an employee payroll credit, repudiation of any carbon taxes and carbon credit trading, re-establishing public equity in BC Investment Management Corporation, re-establishment a Grand jury system, restrictions on judicial reviews of legislative actions, and elections for local provincial court judges.

Sex Party

Leader: John Ince

Billing itself as "the world's first sex-positive party", the Sex Party nominated three candidates in Vancouver ridings, as it did in 2005. According to its website, its platform includes, amongst other points, requiring sexual health and hygiene education in schools, requiring school districts to establish professional support programs to address discrimination of sexual minorities, providing provincial funding for institutes studying and teaching human sexuality or researching sexuality policy issues, reserve designate areas for nudists on all public parks and beaches larger than one hectare, establish a Sex Worker Empowerment Program as an agency providing counseling, education, and advocacy to sex workers, requiring municipalities to treat sex toy businesses as other retail businesses, repeal sex negative regulations, requiring all long term care institutions to articulate a sexuality policy that is non-judgmental about residents' sexuality, creating a Sex-Positive Press Council to expose overt and subtle censorship in BC media, changing Victoria Day to Eros Day to celebrate and encourage sex-positive expression, and proclaiming Valentine's Day a statutory holiday.

Western Canada Concept

Leader: Doug Christie

The Western Canada Concept had one candidate running in this election, down from two candidates in the 2005 election. The party strongly advocates independence for western Canada, and amongst other points advocates for anti-abortion legislation, strong private property rights, balanced budgets, promotion of cultural assimilation rather than multiculturalism, and compulsory public service with a volunteer armed forces.

Work Less Party of British Columbia

Leader: Conrad Schmidt

The WLP is an anti-materialist political movement that hopes to achieve socialist and green ends through, among other things, the promotion of a four-day, 32-hour work-week. The party had 2 candidates down from 11 in 2005. The 2005 BC election marked the debut in Western politics of any registered party expressly driven by the ideology of voluntary simplicity.

Your Political Party

Leader: James Filippelli

The party nominated one candidate in 2005 and two in 2009. Among other points, it advocates publishing reports explaining where every tax dollar is spent, free votes in the legislature, making all campaign promises legally binding, requiring MLAs hold public townhall-style meetings at least once every four months, labelling products sold in BC indicating environmental standards, adding generating capacity to existing dams, opening run-of-river dam project areas to recreational use, providing periodic written statements detailing the cost of each citizen's use of the health care system, provide forgivable loans to post-secondary students who continue to live and work in BC after graduation, permit more private post-secondary institutions, requiring all people serving time in jail to work to pay for the cost of their incarceration, legalization of marijuana, eliminate the property transfer tax, disallow restrictions on secondary suites and minimum home sizes, harvesting all Pine Beetle affected timber immediately, limiting the total allowable yearly fishing catch (rather than regulating length of the fishing season), require weekly educational programs for anyone receiving welfare payments, provide before and after school childcare, permitting private insurance companies to compete with ICBC.

== Timeline of the campaign ==
April 10, 2008, passage of the Electoral Districts Act, 2008 moving BC from 79 to 85 constituencies.

October 29, 2008, by-elections in Vancouver-Burrard and Vancouver-Fairview, both won by the New Democrats.

April 14, 2009, the campaign will officially begin when the writ is issued.

April 24, 2009 1pm close of nominations for the election.

May 12, 2009, Election day.

=== Debates ===
There was one TV debate featuring the leaders of the three major parties: Gordon Campbell, Carole James, and Jane Sterk on all three major BC networks on Sunday May 3 at 5:00 p.m.

CKNW had a debate of the three leaders on April 23 from 8:30 a.m. to 10:00 a.m.

CBC Radio One had a debate of the three leaders on April 21 at 7:30 a.m.

== Opinion polls ==
Evolution of voting intentions at provincial level
Polling firm	Last day of survey	Source	Liberal	NDP	Green	Cons.	Other	ME	Sample
Voting results			45.82	42.15	8.21	2.10	1.72		
Ipsos	May 7, 2009	1 · 2	47	39	10	—N/a	4	±3.5	800
Mustel	May 7, 2009		47	38	12	—N/a	3	—N/a	—N/a
Angus Reid	May 6, 2009		44	42	10	2	2	±3.1	1,013
Environics	May 2, 2009		47	36	13	—N/a	5	—N/a	—N/a
Angus Reid	April 28, 2009		42	39	13	3	3	—N/a	—N/a
Mustel	April 7, 2009		52	35	12	—N/a	1	±4.5	483
Angus Reid	March 25, 2009		43	37	13	4	3	—N/a	—N/a
Ipsos	March 24, 2009		46	35	15	—N/a	4	—N/a	—N/a
Mustel	February 10, 2009		52	36	12	—N/a	1	—N/a	—N/a
Mustel	January 15, 2009		47	33	16	—N/a	4	—N/a	—N/a
Angus Reid	August 25, 2008		38	41	14	—N/a	7	±3.5	802
2005 British Columbia general election	May 17, 2005		45.80	41.52	9.18	0.55	2.95		

== Results ==
Elections to the 39th Legislative Assembly of British Columbia (2009)
Party	Leader	Candidates	Votes				Seats		
Party	Leader	Candidates	#	±	%	Change (pp)	2005	2009	±
Liberal	Gordon Campbell	85	751,661	55,457▼	45.82	0.02	46	49 / 85	3▲
New Democratic	Carole James	85	691,564	40,219▼	42.15	0.63	33	35 / 85	2▲
Green	Jane Sterk	85	134,616	27,233▼	8.21	-0.98			
Conservative	Wilf Hanni	24	34,451	24,828▲	2.10	1.55			
Independent		16	18,686	1,087▲	1.14	0.14	–	1 / 85	1▲
Marijuana	Marc Emery	1	361	11,088▼	0.02	-0.63			
Democratic Reform	Did not campaign					-0.80			
Refederation	Mike Summers	22	3,748	3,073▲	0.23	0.19			
Libertarian		6	1,486	433▲	0.09	0.03			
Reform	David Charles Hawkins	4	1,106	741▲	0.07	0.05			
Nation Alliance	Wei Ping Chen	2	818	818▲	0.05	New			
Communist	George Gidora	3	433	189▲	0.03	0.01			
People's Front	Charles Boylan	4	401	21▲	0.02	–			
Your Political Party	James Filippelli	2	335	107▼	0.02	–			
Work Less	Conrad Schmidt	2	322	1,319▼	0.02	−0.07			
Sex	John Ince	3	319	14▲	0.02	–			
Western Canada Concept	Doug Christie	1	235	152▼	0.01	−0.01			
Total		345	1,640,542		100.00%				

=== Vote and seat summaries ===
Ternary plots – shift of electoral support (2005–2009)
2005

2009
Electoral districts identified by colours of winning parties

== MLAs elected ==
Abbotsford-Mission: Randy Hawes
Abbotsford South: John van Dongen
Abbotsford West: Mike de Jong
Alberni-Pacific Rim: Scott Fraser
Boundary-Similkameen: John Slater
Burnaby-Deer Lake: Kathy Corrigan
Burnaby-Edmonds: Raj Chouhan
Burnaby-Lougheed: Harry Bloy
Burnaby North: Richard Lee
Cariboo-Chilcotin: Donna Barnett
Cariboo North: Bob Simpson
Chilliwack: John Les
Chilliwack-Hope: Barry Penner
Columbia River-Revelstoke: Norm Macdonald
Comox Valley: Don McRae
Coquitlam-Burke Mountain: Douglas Horne
Coquitlam-Maillardville: Diane Thorne
Cowichan Valley: Bill Routley
Delta North: Guy Gentner
Delta South: Vicki Huntington
Esquimalt-Royal Roads: Maurine Karagianis
Fort Langley-Aldergrove: Rich Coleman
Fraser-Nicola: Harry Lali
Juan de Fuca: John Horgan
Kamloops-North Thompson: Terry Lake
Kamloops-South Thompson: Kevin Krueger
Kelowna-Lake Country: Norm Letnick
Kelowna-Mission: Steve Thomson
Kootenay East: Bill Bennett
Kootenay West: Katrine Conroy
Langley: Mary Polak
Maple Ridge-Mission: Marc Dalton
Maple Ridge-Pitt Meadows: Michael Sather
Nanaimo: Leonard Krog
Nanaimo-North Cowichan: Doug Routley
Nechako Lakes: John Rustad
Nelson-Creston: Michelle Mungall
New Westminster: Dawn Black
North Coast: Gary Coons
North Island: Claire Trevena
North Vancouver-Lonsdale: Naomi Yamamoto
North Vancouver-Seymour: Jane Thornthwaite
Oak Bay-Gordon Head: Ida Chong
Parksville-Qualicum: Ron Cantelon
Peace River North: Pat Pimm
Peace River South: Blair Lekstrom
Penticton: Bill Barisoff
Port Coquitlam: Mike Farnworth
Port Moody-Coquitlam: Iain Black
Powell River-Sunshine Coast: Nicholas Simons
Prince George-Mackenzie: Pat Bell
Prince George-Valemount: Shirley Bond
Richmond Centre: Rob Howard
Richmond East: Linda Reid
Richmond-Steveston: John Yap
Saanich North and the Islands: Murray Coell
Saanich South: Lana Popham
Shuswap: George Abbott
Skeena: Robin Austin
Stikine: Doug Donaldson
Surrey-Cloverdale: Kevin Falcon
Surrey-Fleetwood: Jagrup Brar
Surrey-Green Timbers: Sue Hammell
Surrey-Newton: Harry Bains
Surrey-Panorama: Stephanie Cadieux
Surrey-Tynehead: Dave Hayer
Surrey-Whalley: Bruce Ralston
Surrey-White Rock: Gordon Hogg
Vancouver-Fairview: Margaret MacDiarmid
Vancouver-False Creek: Mary McNeil
Vancouver-Fraserview: Kash Heed
Vancouver-Hastings: Shane Simpson
Vancouver-Kensington: Mable Elmore
Vancouver-Kingsway: Adrian Dix
Vancouver-Langara: Moira Stilwell
Vancouver-Mount Pleasant: Jenny Kwan
Vancouver-Point Grey: Gordon Campbell
Vancouver-Quilchena: Colin Hansen
Vancouver-West End: Spencer Chandra Herbert
Vernon-Monashee: Eric Foster
Victoria-Beacon Hill: Carole James
Victoria-Swan Lake: Rob Fleming
West Vancouver-Capilano: Ralph Sultan
West Vancouver-Sea to Sky: Joan McIntyre
Westside-Kelowna: Ben Stewart

=== Synopsis of results ===
Results by riding – 2009 British Columbia general election
Riding	Winning party						Turnout (Note: including spoilt ballots)	Votes (Note: parties receiving more than 1% of the popular vote, or fielding candidates in at least half of the constituencies, are listed separately.)						
Name	2005	Party	Votes	Share	Margin #	Margin %	Turnout	Lib	NDP	Grn	Con	Ind	Oth	Total
Abbotsford-Mission	New	Lib	10,371	58.36%	4,583	25.79%	52.10%	10,371	5,788	1,611	–	–	–	17,770
Abbotsford South	New	Lib	9,566	58.47%	5,369	32.82%	48.75%	9,566	4,197	1,244	1,019	334	–	16,360
Abbotsford West	Lib	Lib	8,992	55.81%	3,886	24.12%	52.86%	8,992	5,106	970	1,043	–	–	16,111
Alberni-Pacific Rim	NDP	NDP	10,488	59.36%	4,883	27.64%	57.68%	5,605	10,488	1,324	–	–	250	17,667
Boundary-Similkameen	New	Lib	6,681	37.45%	811	4.55%	62.31%	6,681	5,870	1,691	3,596	–	–	17,838
Burnaby-Deer Lake	Lib	NDP	8,103	48.75%	512	3.08%	48.65%	7,591	8,103	928	–	–	–	16,622
Burnaby-Edmonds	NDP	NDP	8,647	51.94%	2,262	13.59%	49.07%	6,385	8,647	1,122	–	–	493	16,647
Burnaby-Lougheed	Lib	Lib	9,207	48.45%	696	3.66%	53.59%	9,207	8,511	1,285	–	–	–	19,003
Burnaby North	Lib	Lib	9,880	48.19%	548	2.67%	53.85%	9,880	9,332	1,292	–	–	–	20,504
Cariboo-Chilcotin	NDP	Lib	6,259	47.85%	88	0.67%	62.93%	6,259	6,171	650	–	–	–	13,080
Cariboo North	NDP	NDP	7,004	49.51%	503	3.56%	60.24%	6,501	7,004	643	–	–	–	14,148
Chilliwack	Lib	Lib	8,138	44.61%	2,230	12.23%	50.87%	8,138	5,908	1,523	2,672	–	–	18,241
Chilliwack-Hope	Lib	Lib	8,985	53.28%	3,347	19.85%	51.85%	8,985	5,638	951	1,198	–	93	16,865
Columbia River-Revelstoke	NDP	NDP	7,419	55.29%	2,326	17.33%	56.17%	5,093	7,419	907	–	–	–	13,419
Comox Valley	Lib	Lib	13,886	47.30%	1,378	4.69%	60.99%	13,886	12,508	2,577	–	–	386	29,357
Coquitlam-Burke Mountain	New	Lib	8,644	56.83%	3,251	21.37%	48.87%	8,644	5,393	907	–	–	266	15,210
Coquitlam-Maillardville	NDP	NDP	9,818	47.93%	673	3.29%	55.22%	9,145	9,818	1,040	–	481	–	20,484
Cowichan Valley	New	NDP	12,548	48.40%	3,290	12.69%	62.54%	9,258	12,548	3,058	924	–	139	25,927
Delta North	NDP	NDP	10,381	50.48%	1,891	9.20%	59.26%	8,490	10,381	938	756	–	–	20,565
Delta South	Lib	Ind	9,977	42.50%	32	0.14%	68.59%	9,945	2,940	555	–	10,037	–	23,477
Esquimalt-Royal Roads	NDP	NDP	11,514	52.92%	4,935	22.68%	58.27%	6,579	11,514	3,664	–	–	–	21,757
Fort Langley-Aldergrove	Lib	Lib	15,139	61.09%	7,647	30.86%	57.63%	15,139	7,492	1,765	–	–	387	24,783
Fraser-Nicola	New	NDP	6,703	49.12%	873	6.40%	63.38%	5,830	6,703	891	–	–	223	13,647
Juan de Fuca	NDP	NDP	11,520	57.21%	4,654	23.11%	59.87%	6,866	11,520	1,749	–	–	–	20,135
Kamloops-North Thompson	Lib	Lib	9,830	46.94%	510	2.44%	55.05%	9,830	9,320	1,418	–	–	375	20,943
Kamloops-South Thompson	Lib	Lib	12,548	53.86%	4,416	18.95%	57.56%	12,548	8,132	1,529	1,090	–	–	23,299
Kelowna-Lake Country	Lib	Lib	10,281	52.11%	5,031	25.50%	47.25%	10,281	5,250	1,375	2,253	571	–	19,730
Kelowna-Mission	Lib	Lib	11,506	53.90%	5,940	27.83%	50.68%	11,506	5,566	1,563	2,531	130	51	21,347
Kootenay East	Lib	Lib	8,404	51.22%	2,560	15.60%	55.87%	8,404	5,844	549	1,612	–	–	16,409
Kootenay West	New	NDP	12,126	66.65%	8,054	44.27%	59.10%	4,072	12,126	1,791	–	–	204	18,193
Langley	Lib	Lib	13,282	56.55%	4,871	20.74%	55.09%	13,282	8,411	1,793	–	–	–	23,486
Maple Ridge-Mission	Lib	Lib	8,802	45.73%	68	0.35%	55.10%	8,802	8,734	1,387	–	–	325	19,248
Maple Ridge-Pitt Meadows	NDP	NDP	9,772	47.07%	274	1.32%	56.90%	9,498	9,772	1,149	–	202	140	20,761
Nanaimo	NDP	NDP	11,877	53.33%	3,791	17.02%	57.12%	8,086	11,877	2,036	–	–	272	22,271
Nanaimo-North Cowichan	New	NDP	12,888	54.33%	4,462	18.81%	61.45%	8,426	12,888	2,135	–	–	271	23,720
Nechako Lakes	Lib	Lib	4,949	55.76%	1,816	20.46%	54.80%	4,949	3,133	559	–	–	235	8,876
Nelson-Creston	NDP	NDP	9,060	54.83%	3,869	23.42%	60.30%	5,191	9,060	1,189	1,083	–	–	16,523
New Westminster	NDP	NDP	13,418	56.36%	5,178	21.75%	55.99%	8,240	13,418	2,151	–	–	–	23,809
North Coast	NDP	NDP	5,097	57.33%	1,987	22.35%	57.14%	3,110	5,097	683	–	–	–	8,890
North Island	NDP	NDP	11,865	52.03%	2,928	12.84%	57.21%	8,937	11,865	1,670	–	333	–	22,805
North Vancouver-Lonsdale	Lib	Lib	10,323	49.16%	2,534	12.07%	55.56%	10,323	7,789	1,791	862	–	232	20,997
North Vancouver-Seymour	Lib	Lib	13,426	59.18%	7,214	31.80%	61.46%	13,426	6,212	2,116	931	–	–	22,685
Oak Bay-Gordon Head	Lib	Lib	11,877	46.53%	561	2.20%	66.86%	11,877	11,316	2,330	–	–	–	25,523
Parksville-Qualicum	Lib	Lib	13,716	51.42%	3,580	13.42%	65.70%	13,716	10,136	2,573	–	–	251	26,676
Peace River North	Lib	Lib	3,992	43.15%	1,093	11.81%	40.01%	3,992	1,293	1,010	–	2,899	58	9,252
Peace River South	Lib	Lib	4,801	63.08%	2,744	36.05%	44.00%	4,801	2,057	533	–	220	–	7,611
Penticton	Lib	Lib	10,346	43.96%	3,015	12.81%	56.16%	10,346	7,331	3,685	2,095	–	78	23,535
Port Coquitlam	New	NDP	11,121	54.71%	3,225	15.87%	55.21%	7,896	11,121	994	–	–	315	20,326
Port Moody-Coquitlam	New	Lib	9,979	52.15%	2,365	12.36%	57.44%	9,979	7,614	1,261	–	–	280	19,134
Powell River-Sunshine Coast	NDP	NDP	13,276	58.28%	5,458	23.96%	63.03%	7,818	13,276	1,436	–	–	249	22,779
Prince George-Mackenzie	Lib	Lib	9,816	56.05%	3,364	19.21%	53.69%	9,816	6,452	1,245	–	–	–	17,513
Prince George-Valemount	Lib	Lib	9,072	50.61%	2,335	13.03%	51.95%	9,072	6,737	1,225	780	–	113	17,927
Richmond Centre	Lib	Lib	10,483	61.51%	5,534	32.47%	40.97%	10,483	4,949	1,213	–	–	399	17,044
Richmond East	Lib	Lib	10,853	58.73%	4,855	26.27%	45.16%	10,853	5,998	1,211	–	–	419	18,481
Richmond-Steveston	Lib	Lib	13,168	60.78%	7,243	33.43%	51.57%	13,168	5,925	1,491	1,082	–	–	21,666
Saanich North and the Islands	Lib	Lib	13,136	44.93%	258	0.88%	66.82%	13,136	12,878	3,223	–	–	–	29,237
Saanich South	NDP	NDP	11,697	47.14%	482	1.94%	66.40%	11,215	11,697	1,664	–	–	235	24,811
Shuswap	Lib	Lib	10,764	46.62%	3,713	16.08%	56.82%	10,764	7,051	2,539	2,374	–	361	23,089
Skeena	NDP	NDP	5,865	50.77%	1,537	13.30%	55.15%	4,328	5,865	467	893	–	–	11,553
Stikine	Lib	NDP	4,274	50.41%	445	5.25%	65.28%	3,829	4,274	375	–	–	–	8,478
Surrey-Cloverdale	Lib	Lib	13,815	62.70%	7,248	32.90%	55.03%	13,815	6,567	1,651	–	–	–	22,033
Surrey-Fleetwood	New	NDP	8,852	50.15%	1,992	11.29%	53.96%	6,860	8,852	1,120	818	–	–	17,650
Surrey-Green Timbers	NDP	NDP	10,966	72.73%	7,342	48.69%	51.13%	3,624	10,966	488	–	–	–	15,078
Surrey-Newton	NDP	NDP	10,709	68.93%	6,698	43.11%	51.12%	4,011	10,709	759	–	–	58	15,537
Surrey-Panorama	NDP	Lib	11,820	54.26%	3,145	14.44%	56.71%	11,820	8,675	1,290	–	–	–	21,785
Surrey-Tynehead	Lib	Lib	8,814	52.50%	1,557	9.27%	49.71%	8,814	7,257	717	–	–	–	16,788
Surrey-Whalley	NDP	NDP	10,453	66.47%	6,370	40.51%	47.39%	4,083	10,453	1,189	–	–	–	15,725
Surrey-White Rock	Lib	Lib	15,121	62.05%	8,453	34.68%	61.84%	15,121	6,668	2,118	–	–	464	24,371
Vancouver-Fairview	NDP	Lib	11,034	47.09%	1,153	4.92%	56.50%	11,034	9,881	2,232	–	165	122	23,434
Vancouver-False Creek	New	Lib	9,223	56.40%	4,721	28.87%	48.15%	9,223	4,502	2,144	385	73	27	16,354
Vancouver-Fraserview	Lib	Lib	9,549	49.29%	748	3.86%	51.09%	9,549	8,801	904	–	–	118	19,372
Vancouver-Hastings	NDP	NDP	10,857	55.49%	4,534	23.17%	50.58%	6,323	10,857	2,012	–	–	373	19,565
Vancouver-Kensington	NDP	NDP	9,930	52.55%	2,252	11.92%	51.98%	7,678	9,930	1,288	–	–	–	18,896
Vancouver-Kingsway	NDP	NDP	9,229	55.17%	2,711	16.21%	46.99%	6,518	9,229	699	–	–	283	16,729
Vancouver-Langara	Lib	Lib	10,615	58.87%	4,275	23.71%	47.71%	10,615	6,340	1,075	–	–	–	18,030
Vancouver-Mount Pleasant	NDP	NDP	11,232	63.95%	7,578	43.15%	46.47%	3,654	11,232	2,507	–	–	171	17,564
Vancouver-Point Grey	Lib	Lib	11,546	50.38%	2,314	10.10%	55.98%	11,546	9,232	2,012	–	–	130	22,920
Vancouver-Quilchena	Lib	Lib	15,731	70.22%	11,085	49.48%	57.67%	15,731	4,646	2,024	–	–	–	22,401
Vancouver-West End	New	NDP	9,926	56.51%	4,191	23.86%	49.93%	5,735	9,926	1,582	–	36	286	17,565
Vernon-Monashee	Lib	Lib	9,015	37.27%	1,317	5.45%	53.73%	9,015	7,698	4,029	1,972	1,397	76	24,187
Victoria-Beacon Hill	NDP	NDP	13,400	55.37%	7,025	29.03%	57.18%	6,375	13,400	4,106	–	319	–	24,200
Victoria-Swan Lake	NDP	NDP	13,119	60.53%	7,365	33.98%	56.90%	5,754	13,119	2,628	–	–	174	21,675
West Vancouver-Capilano	Lib	Lib	15,292	67.48%	12,001	52.95%	57.96%	15,292	3,291	1,699	710	1,489	182	22,663
West Vancouver-Sea to Sky	Lib	Lib	10,101	54.91%	5,887	32.00%	53.07%	10,101	4,214	4,082	–	–	–	18,397
Westside-Kelowna	Lib	Lib	10,334	53.33%	4,678	24.14%	47.35%	10,334	5,656	1,617	1,772	–	–	19,379

= Open seat
= turnout is above provincial average
= winning candidate was in previous Legislature
= Incumbent had switched allegiance
= Previously incumbent in another riding
= Not incumbent; was previously elected to the Legislature
= Incumbency arose from by-election gain
= other incumbents renominated
= previously an MP in the House of Commons of Canada
= Multiple candidates

=== Summary analysis ===
Party candidates in 2nd place
Party in 1st place	Party in 2nd place			Total
Party in 1st place	Lib	NDP	Ind	Total
Liberal		48	1	49
New Democratic	35			35
Independent	1			1
Total	36	48	1	85

Candidates ranked 1st to 5th place, by party
Parties	1st	2nd	3rd	4th	5th
█ Liberal	49	36			
█ New Democratic	35	48	2		
█ Independent	1	1		7	6
█ Green			74	11	
█ Conservative			9	14	1
█ Refederation				12	6
█ Libertarian				5	
█ Communist				3	
█ Reform				2	2
█ Nation Alliance				2	
█ Sex				1	2
█ Work Less				1	1
█ Your Political Party				1	1
█ Western Canada Concept				1	
█ People's Front					3
█ Marijuana					1

Resulting composition of the 39th Legislative Assembly of British Columbia
Source		Party			
Source		Lib	NDP	Ind	Total
Seats retained	Incumbents returned	26	22		48
Seats retained	Open seats held – new MLAs	13	4		17
Seats retained	Open seats held – taken by MLA previously incumbent in another riding	1			1
Seats changing hands	Incumbents defeated	2	1		3
Seats changing hands	Open seats gained	1	1	1	3
New seats	New MLAs	3	1		4
New seats	MLAs previously incumbent in another riding	3	6		9
Total		49	35	1	85

== Sources ==
- Statement of Votes - 39th Provincial General Election (PDF). Victoria: Elections BC. 2009. ISSN 0227-9207.
