= 2008 British Columbia electoral redistribution =

An electoral redistribution was undertaken in 2008 in British Columbia in a process that began in late 2005 and was completed with the passage of the Electoral Districts Act, 2008 on April 10, 2008. The redistribution modified most electoral boundaries in the province and increased the number of MLAs from 79 to 85. The electoral boundaries created by the redistribution were first used in the 2009 provincial election.

The provincial government mandated the BC Electoral Boundaries Commission to recommend new maps (for both BC-STV and the traditional "single-member plurality" SMP systems) prior to the second electoral reform referendum. The commission's preliminary report, delivered in August 2007, was received with concern by both the New Democratic Party opposition and the governing Liberal party. In addition to concerns about boundaries and size of individual ridings, the commission was criticized for shifting seats to the Lower Mainland (which was growing in population) and away from larger but less populated areas (BC has traditionally given some electoral weight to vast but relatively underpopulated regions without large urban centres, particularly in the north).

The commission held subsequent hearings and, in February 2008, submitted 50 amendments to its preliminary report. Province-wide, the amendments would result in a net increase of four electoral districts, for a total of 83 single member plurality electoral districts. The number of proposed BC-STV electoral districts remained at 20. Because of the concern of both parties about the loss of seats in the North and Cariboo, the Commission also reported on the 85-seat map it would have designed if the legislature had passed an amendment requiring this. The legislature then approved the alternative boundaries for 85 ridings.

The 2008 provincial election in neighbouring Alberta served as a reminder to BC of the "unfinished business" looming ahead. Ed Stelmach's Conservative party won a sizable majority government (73 out of 83 seats) on the strength of a bare majority of votes cast. In response, the Vancouver Sun described BC's indecision over boundaries as "a significant hitch (that) has developed in the electoral boundary reform process that was to have illustrated how an STV system would carve up the province...Unless members of the legislature are able to forge a compromise that will rescue the politically unpalatable recommendations of the Electoral Boundaries Commission, voters will face another vote on whether to change the system while still uncertain as to how it will look in their home communities."

== Changes ==
=== No change (6) ===
- Comox Valley
- Delta North
- Delta South
- New Westminster
- North Island
- Saanich North and the Islands

=== Adjusted (44) ===
- Burnaby North
- Burnaby-Edmonds
- Cariboo North
- Columbia River-Revelstoke
- Coquitlam-Maillardville
- Fort Langley-Aldergrove
- Kamloops-North Thompson
- Kelowna-Lake Country
- Kelowna-Mission
- Langley
- Maple Ridge-Mission
- Maple Ridge-Pitt Meadows
- Nanaimo
- Nelson-Creston
- North Coast
- North Vancouver-Lonsdale
- North Vancouver-Seymour
- Oak Bay-Gordon Head
- Peace River North
- Peace River South
- Powell River-Sunshine Coast
- Richmond Centre
- Richmond East
- Richmond-Steveston
- Saanich South
- Shuswap
- Skeena
- Surrey-Cloverdale
- Surrey-Green Timbers
- Surrey-Newton
- Surrey-Tynehead
- Surrey-Whalley
- Surrey-White Rock
- Vancouver-Fairview
- Vancouver-Fraserview
- Vancouver-Hastings
- Vancouver-Kensington
- Vancouver-Kingsway
- Vancouver-Langara
- Vancouver-Mount Pleasant
- Vancouver-Point Grey
- Vancouver-Quilchena
- Victoria-Beacon Hill
- West Vancouver-Capilano

=== Minor adjustment with name change (3) ===
- Kootenay East (was "East Kootenay")
- Vernon-Monashee (was "Okanagan-Vernon")
- West Vancouver-Sea to Sky (was "West Vancouver-Garibaldi")

=== Replaced (26) ===
(primary successor riding is shown)

- Abbotsford-Clayburn → Abbotsford-Mission
- Abbotsford-Mount Lehman → Abbotsford West
- Alberni-Qualicum → Alberni-Pacific Rim
- Bulkley Valley-Stikine → Stikine
- Burnaby-Willingdon → Burnaby-Deer Lake
- Burquitlam → Burnaby-Lougheed
- Cariboo South → Cariboo-Chilcotin
- Chilliwack-Kent → Chilliwack-Hope
- Chilliwack-Sumas → Chilliwack
- Cowichan-Ladysmith → Cowichan Valley
- Esquimalt-Metchosin → Esquimalt-Royal Roads
- Kamloops → Kamloops-South Thompson
- Malahat-Juan de Fuca → Juan de Fuca
- Nanaimo-Parksville → Parksville-Qualicum
- Okanagan-Westside → Westside-Kelowna
- Penticton-Okanagan Valley → Penticton
- Port Coquitlam-Burke Mountain → Port Coquitlam
- Port Moody-Westwood → Port Moody-Coquitlam
- Prince George North → Prince George-Mackenzie
- Prince George-Mount Robson → Prince George-Valemount
- Prince George-Omineca → Nechako Lakes
- Surrey-Panorama Ridge → Surrey-Panorama
- Vancouver-Burrard → Vancouver-West End
- Victoria-Hillside → Victoria-Swan Lake
- West Kootenay-Boundary → Kootenay West
- Yale-Lillooet → Fraser-Nicola

=== New ridings (6) ===
- Abbotsford South
- Boundary-Similkameen
- Coquitlam-Burke Mountain
- Nanaimo-North Cowichan
- Surrey-Fleetwood
- Vancouver-False Creek

== See also ==
- New Brunswick electoral redistribution, 2006
