= Vancouver-West End =

Provincial electoral district in British Columbia, Canada

British Columbia electoral district
- Interactive map of riding boundaries

Provincial electoral district
- Legislature: Legislative Assembly of British Columbia
MLA
Spencer Chandra Herbert
New Democratic
- District created: 2008
- First contested: 2009
- Last contested: 2026

Demographics
- Population (2021): 57,332
- Area (km²): 14
- Pop. density (per km²): 4,095.1
- Census division: Metro Vancouver
- Census subdivision: Vancouver (part)

Vancouver-West End is a provincial electoral district for the Legislative Assembly of British Columbia.

Created under the 2008 British Columbia electoral redistribution, the district was first contested in the 2009 general election. It was created from parts of Vancouver-Burrard.

== Demographics ==
Population, 2021	57,332
Area (km^{2})	14
Population density (people per km^{2})	4,095
Source: BC Electoral Boundaries Commission

== Geography ==
Located in Vancouver, the district comprises the West End, Coal Harbour, Davie Village and Stanley Park. It is bordered by English Bay and False Creek to the south and west, and Burrard Inlet to the north.

== Members of the Legislative Assembly ==
This district has elected the following members of the Legislative Assembly:

Assembly	Years	Member	Party
Vancouver-West End; Riding created from Vancouver-Burrard
39th	2009–2013	Spencer Chandra Herbert	New Democratic
40th	2013–2017	Spencer Chandra Herbert	New Democratic
41st	2017–2020	Spencer Chandra Herbert	New Democratic
42nd	2020–2024	Spencer Chandra Herbert	New Democratic
43rd	2024–2026	Spencer Chandra Herbert	New Democratic
44th	2026–present	Spencer Chandra Herbert	New Democratic

== Electoral history ==
2026 British Columbia general election
Party	Candidate	Votes	%	±%	Expenditures
New Democratic	Spencer Chandra Herbert	8,661	51.6	-11.4	
Conservative	Dion Weisner	5,115	30.5	+3.3	
Green	Scott MacDonald	3,001	17.9	+8.8	
Total valid votes		16,777			
Total rejected ballots					
Turnout					
Registered voters					
New Democratic hold		Swing		+21.1	
Source: Elections BC

2024 British Columbia general election
Party	Candidate	Votes	%	±%	Expenditures
New Democratic	Spencer Chandra Herbert	13,143	63.0%	+0.69	
Conservative	Jon Ellacott	5,677	27.2%	–	
Green	Eoin O'Dwyer	1,893	9.1%	-7.18	
Independent	Carl Turnbull	144	0.7%		
Total valid votes			–		
Total rejected ballots					
Turnout					
Registered voters					
New Democratic hold		Swing		–	
Source: Elections BC

2020 British Columbia general election
Party	Candidate	Votes	%	±%	Expenditures
New Democratic	Spencer Chandra Herbert	12,439	62.31	+1.34	$25,256.82
Liberal	Jon Ellacott	4,014	20.11	−2.89	$13,290.51
Green	James Marshall	3,250	16.28	+2.38	$6,243.74
Libertarian	Kim McCann	259	1.30	−0.30	$123.85
Total valid votes		19,962	100.00	–	
Total rejected ballots		104	0.52	+0.13	
Turnout		20,066	51.77	–4.76	
Registered voters		38,762			
New Democratic hold		Swing		+2.12	
Source: Elections BC

2017 British Columbia general election
Party	Candidate	Votes	%	±%	Expenditures
New Democratic	Spencer Chandra Herbert	13,420	60.97	+4.16	$45,663
Liberal	Nigel Elliott	5,064	23.00	−5.25	$43,628
Green	James Marshall	3,059	13.90	+2.51	$2,132
Libertarian	John Clarke	352	1.60	−0.76	$0
Independent	Leon David Dunn	116	0.53	–	$282
Total valid votes		22,011	100.00	–	
Total rejected ballots		87	0.39	−0.20	
Turnout		22,098	56.53	+5.89	
Registered voters		39,094			
Source: Elections BC

2013 British Columbia general election
Party	Candidate	Votes	%	±%	Expenditures
New Democratic	Spencer Chandra Herbert	10,755	56.81	+0.30	$80,612
Liberal	Scott Harrison	5,349	28.25	−4.40	$27,424
Green	Jodie Emery	2,156	11.39	+2.38	$3,295
Libertarian	John Clarke	446	2.36	+1.24	$250
No Affiliation	Ronald Guillermo Herbert	132	0.70	–	$361
Work Less	Mathew David Kagis	94	0.50	–	$250
Total valid votes		18,932	100.00	–	
Total rejected ballots		112	0.59	+0.05	
Turnout		19,044	50.64	+0.71	
Registered voters		37,609			
Source: Elections BC

2009 British Columbia general election
Party	Candidate	Votes	%	Expenditures
New Democratic	Spencer Chandra Herbert	9,926	56.51	$65,124
Liberal	Laura McDiarmid	5,735	32.65	$43,941
Green	Drina Read	1,582	9.01	$2,742
Libertarian	John Clarke	196	1.12	$250
Sex	Scarlett Lake	90	0.51	$250
Non-affiliated	Menard D. Caissy	36	0.20	$317
Total valid votes		17,565	100	
Total rejected ballots		96	0.54	
Turnout		17,661	49.93	
Registered voters		35,370		

== See also ==
- List of British Columbia provincial electoral districts
- Canadian provincial electoral districts
