= Spencer Chandra Herbert =

Canadian politician

Spencer Chandra Herbert MLA
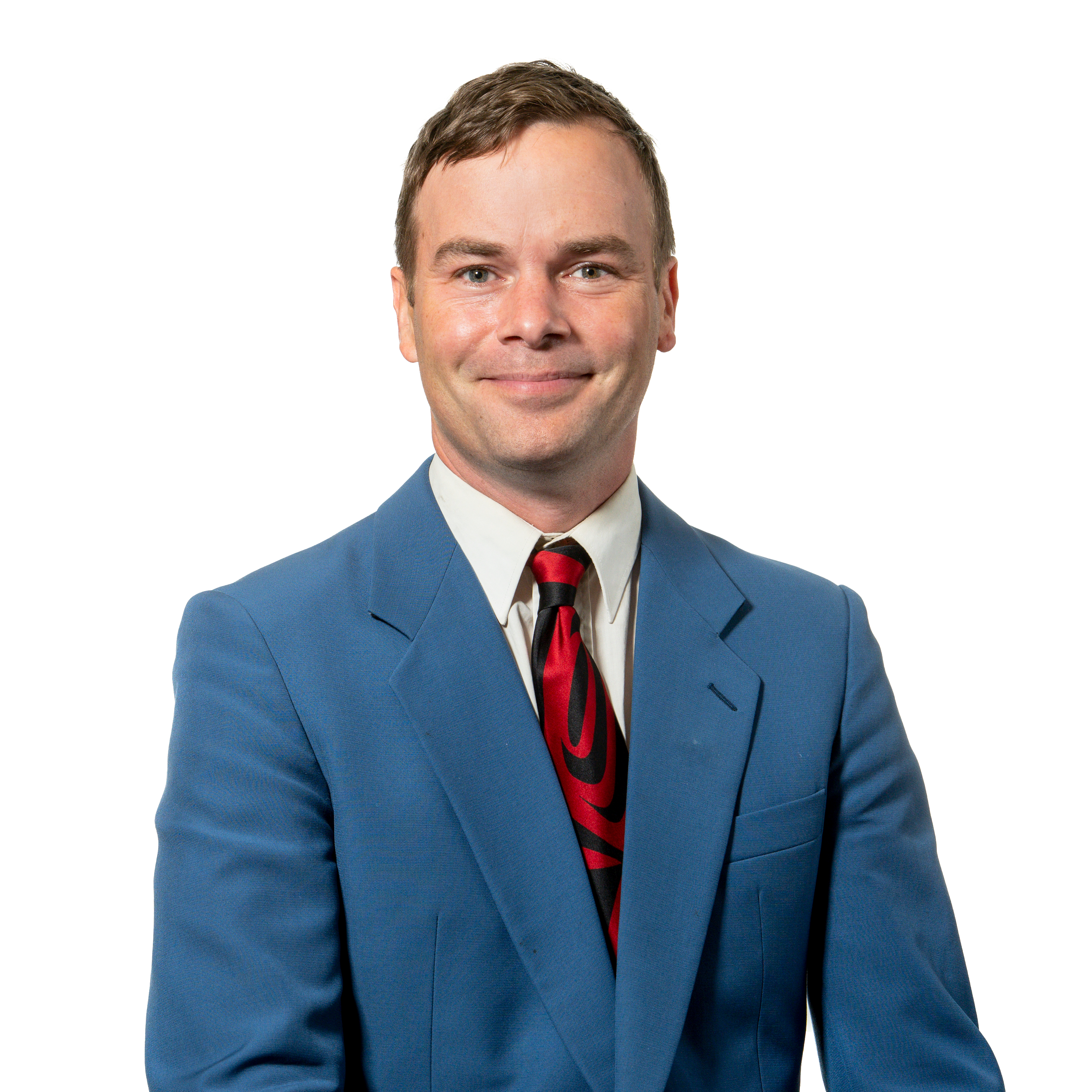
- Chandra Herbert in 2020

Minister of Indigenous Relations and Reconciliation British Columbia
- In office July 17, 2025 – November 20, 2026
- Premier: David Eby
- Preceded by: Christine Boyle

Minister of Tourism, Arts, Culture and Sport of British Columbia
- In office November 18, 2024 – July 17, 2025
- Premier: David Eby
- Preceded by: Lana Popham
- Succeeded by: Anne Kang

Member of the British Columbia Legislative Assembly for Vancouver-West End Vancouver-Burrard (2008–2009)
- Incumbent
- Assumed office October 29, 2008
- Preceded by: Lorne Mayencourt

Vancouver Park Board Commissioner
- In office 2005–2008

Personal details
- Born: May 15, 1981 (age 45) Vancouver, British Columbia, Canada
- Party: New Democratic
- Other political affiliations: COPE (municipal)
- Spouse: Romi Chandra Herbert (m. 2010)
- Children: 1
- Education: Simon Fraser University (BFA)

Spencer Chandra Herbert MLA is a Canadian politician who has served as a member of the Legislative Assembly of British Columbia (MLA) representing the electoral district of Vancouver-West End (formerly Vancouver-Burrard) since 2008. A member of the New Democratic Party, he served in cabinet under Premier David Eby from 2024 to 2026.

Chandra Herbert was first elected to the Legislative Assembly in an October 2008 by-election in the electoral district of Vancouver-Burrard. He was subsequently re-elected in the newly established riding of Vancouver-West End in the 2009 provincial election and has been re-elected in every election since. He served as deputy speaker of the Legislature from 2020 to 2024, when he was appointed Minister of Tourism, Arts, Culture and Sport by Premier David Eby.

Chandra Herbert's BC NDP formed the Official Opposition in the 38th, 39th and 40th British Columbia parliaments, and he was assigned to be the party's critic on tourism, arts and culture and later the critic on environment. He has introduced several private members' bills which were not adopted themselves, but some of the measures were partly or completely adopted by the government later. Examples include provisions to include gender identity or expression among the protected grounds of discrimination in the British Columbia Human Rights Code and measures to address the re-selling of tickets at prices higher than advertised. He also sponsored the Long Term Tenants Protection Act, and the more comprehensive Residential Tenancy Amendment Act, meant to address evictions and high rent increases that were occurring in Vancouver's West End neighbourhood.

Prior to becoming an MLA, he was elected to the Vancouver Park Board. He served as a Park Board commissioner between 2005 and 2008 as a member of the municipal Coalition of Progressive Electors party. While on the Park Board, he voted against removing the requirement for a referendum on an expansion of the Vancouver Aquarium but later voted in favour of the expansion. He advocated for bicycle valet service at large public events, investigating environmentally friendly means of disposing of animal waste, and implementing a zero-net-loss-of-greenspace policy.

Chandra Herbert is openly gay and married his partner, Romi Chandra, in March 2010. Afterwards, he legally changed his name to Spencer Chandra Herbert. Both men have been active supporting causes within the LGBT community. At the provincial level, Chandra Herbert has advocated for a community victim services worker in Davie Village, a specialized telephone line for people to call to report incidents involving gay-bashing or verbal and physical assaults, and for school boards to include LGBT issues, especially in anti-bullying lessons.

== Background ==
Born and raised in Vancouver, Chandra Herbert attended Prince of Wales Mini School and graduated from Simon Fraser University with a Bachelor of Fine Arts. He has worked in various jobs in the entertainment and culture industry, such as being a manager of a dance company, and a worker at the Roundhouse Community Centre. He worked as a producer of the United Nations World Urban Forum Arts and Culture Festival, and been involved with the Better Environmentally Sound Transportation, the B.C. Civil Liberties Association and the GLBT Centre. He has volunteered with Qmunity, the Coal Harbour Residents Association, the West End Residents Association, and the Save St. Paul's Coalition. In 2006, he won a City of Vancouver Youth Award in the "Youth 19 – 24" category.

In the November 2005 municipal elections, Chandra Herbert was a COPE nominee for the Vancouver Park Board. The 24-year-old Herbert was one of two COPE nominees to be elected, with the NPA taking the five other seats. On the Board, Chandra Herbert resisted using the park funds to pay for Olympic-related projects. Chandra Herbert and fellow COPE board member Loretta Woodcock, resisted the Board decision to eliminate the culture and recreation committee by continuing the committee by themselves. Chandra Herbert voted with the board in opposing a proposal to bring animatronic dinosaurs to Stanley Park. Following the December 2006 windstorm that hit Stanley Park, Chandra Herbert held the first fundraiser to assist rehabilitation and enlisted local wood-turners and wood-workers in salvaging trees. In response to homeless people camping in public parks, Chandra Herbert suggested that the city open regulated tent cities, which was quickly rejected by the mayor.

On the Vancouver Aquarium, Chandra Herbert voted against removing the policy requiring a referendum to approve an expansion but ultimately voted in favour of the $80-million expansion after the board agreed to distribute 23,000 free passes to low-income people. To address the loss of green space to new construction, he proposed a zero-net-loss of green space policy but it was rejected by the Board. The NPA-dominated Board also rejected Chandra Herbert's initiatives regarding investigating environmentally friendly means to dispose of dog feces at parks and to have a bicycle valet service at public events (like what was being done at Vancouver Canadians baseball games). Chandra Herbert was successful in having the board direct its food concessionaires to serve only seafood that was Ocean Wise endorsed, though he was alone in voting against extending concessionary leases from one year to ten. In February 2008, the local newspaper WestEnder named Chandra Herbert "Unsung Hero of Vancouver" for the year.

In March 2010, he married his long-time partner Romi Chandra and legally changed his name to Spencer Chandra Herbert. In October 2010, the couple began the process to adopt a child. By July 2014, they had been matched with a child but the extended family objected to the child's placement with a same-sex couple, which was sufficient grounds to halt the adoption. While they continued with the adoption system, they explored other options and a friend offered to be a surrogate mother. The couple agreed and their son was born in 2017.

Chandra Herbert is one of five BC NDP MLAs identified as a landlord in a March 2021 report. According to his 2021 public disclosure statement, Chandra Herbert co-owns an investment property in Vancouver with his spouse. Chandra Herbert's spouse is shown as taking rental income from the property. Chandra Herbert's statement also lists ownership of his primary residence in Victoria as well as a recreational property in West Vancouver.

== Provincial politics ==
=== 38th Parliament ===
After Lorne Mayencourt announced his resignation as MLA, Chandra Herbert announced in May 2008 that he would seek the NDP nomination to run in the resultant by-election. Art Griffiths, the former owner of the Vancouver Canucks, announced he would run for the BC Liberals. While Griffiths was considered a star candidate, he lived in Point Grey, outside the riding. Chandra Herbert was still thought to be the favourite. The October 2008 by-election was also contested by Green Party candidate Drini Read, BC Conservative Ian McLeod, and Marijuana Party leader Marc Emery, but Chandra Herbert won with over 50 percent of the vote. Chandra Herbert, at the age of 27, joined the Legislative Assembly on November 20 during the fourth session of the 38th Parliament. He introduced his first bill on November 24, a private members' bill called the Long Term Renters Protection Act, 2008 (Bill M-228). Chandra Herbert was active helping renters in the West End who were experiencing high-profile increases in rent being approved by the Residential Tenancy Branch. The act sought to stop these large rent increases by removing the ability of Residential Tenancy Branch to approve rent increases based on geographic area – BC was the only province in Canada that has this geographic component to tenancy legislation. The bill only reached first reading and was not adopted, but the rent increases were over-turned in court.

Chandra Herbert was assigned to be the Opposition critic for arts and culture. In this role, he introduced another private members' bill, Consumer Protection in Ticket Sales Act, 2009 (Bill M-202) on March 5, 2009, which would make scalping event admission tickets illegal. The bill was in response to a federal Competition Bureau to probe against Ticketmaster for price-gouging and a class-action lawsuit against Ticketmaster which British Columbians were not allowed to join due to the lack of such a law. The bill did not advance beyond first reading but similar measures focusing on requiring the disclosure of additional fees added by the secondary ticket seller and banning the use of automated ticket purchasing software would be adopted in the 2019 Ticket Sales Act (Bill 27) during the 41st Parliament once the BC NDP formed the government.

=== 39th Parliament ===
In the May 2009 provincial election, Chandra Herbert was again challenged by Green Party candidate Drini Read, as well as BC Liberal candidate and gay rights advocate Laura McDiarmid. Chandra Herbert was again expected to win, which he ultimately did – receiving over 50 percent of the vote – but his party again formed the Official Opposition to a BC Liberal majority government. As the 39th Parliament began, party leader Carole James kept him as the critic of the Ministry of Tourism, Culture and the Arts. Chandra Herbert disapproved of the absorption of the industry-run Crown corporation Tourism BC into the ministry. According to Chandra Herbert, the government took over Tourism BC in retaliation for the organization speaking out against the introduction of the Harmonized Sales Tax and so the government could control messaging and gain exposure during the Vancouver Winter Olympics. He went on to criticize the council responsible for the transition of Tourism BC into the government as being dominated (eight of thirteen members) by BC Liberal financial donors. Chandra Herbert was also critical of the changes, which began in July 2009, and were partially reversed in March and September 2010, to the provincial grant system which distributed proceeds from gambling to non-profit groups involved in arts, culture, sports, and education. Chandra Herbert illustrated the impact of the changes, which included province-wide cuts to non-profit groups, by contrasting them with the cost overruns from both the construction of the Vancouver Convention Centre and the replacement of the BC Place stadium roof.

In June 2010, he brought a motion forward in the Legislative Assembly to declare the Pacific salmon as one of the symbols of British Columbia, and it was added in March 2013. In July 2010, following the release of a study that identified BC as having the highest number of hate crimes in the country, he called upon the government to operate a telephone "bash line" where people could anonymously report incidents involving gay-bashing or verbal and physical assaults. Along with fellow NDP MLA Mable Elmore, he advocated for schools to teach equality for people who are lesbian, gay, bisexual, transgender or questioning.

During a caucus revolt challenging the leadership of Carole James, Chandra Herbert acted as a liaison between the caucus and disgruntled party members and supported James. He considered running in the ensuing leadership election but did not enter the race and did not endorse any candidate.

During the second session of the 39th Parliament, Chandra Herbert re-introduced his Long Term Tenants Protection Act, 2010 (Bill M-209). In the third session, he introduced a more comprehensive act, the Residential Tenancy Amendment Act, 2011 (Bill M-205), which included giving right of first refusal to existing residents during a strata conversion and giving existing residents the option of returning to renovated apartments at a rent increase no more than would otherwise be lawful. He also introduced the Gender Identity and Expression Human Rights Recognition Act, 2011 (Bill M-207), which would have included gender identity and gender expression in the definition of sex in the BC Human Rights Code as a characteristic protected from discrimination. As private member bills, they all received first reading but none were adopted.

=== 40th Parliament ===
In the 2013 British Columbia general election, Chandra Herbert was projected to win re-election, though he was challenged by government worker Scott Harrison for the BC Liberals and cannabis rights activist Jodie Emery for the BC Greens. With over 50 percent of the vote, he won his riding, with the second-place challenger, Harrison, attaining only 28 percent of the vote, but his party again formed the Official Opposition to a BC Liberal majority government. As the 40th Parliament began, he was reassigned to be the party's critic of the Ministry of Environment.

In February 2014, his Vancouver-West End constituency office was vandalized by a man reportedly upset by the display of LGBT pride flags. Chandra Herbert re-introduced his private member bill, the Gender Identity and Expression Human Rights Recognition Act, to specifically include gender identity or expression among the protected grounds of discrimination in the British Columbia Human Rights Code in November 2014 (as Bill M211 in the 3rd session), July 2015 (as Bill M228 in the 4th session), and April 2016 (as Bill M222 in the 5th session), before it was adopted in July 2016 by the government as the Human Rights Code Amendment Act, 2016 (Bill 27). He sponsored one other private member bill: the Protecting Our Lakes and Economy from Invasive Species Act, 2015 (Bill M226) which sought to make watercraft entering BC be subject of mandatory inspections for freshwater dwelling invasive species, such as quagga and zebra mussels.

=== 41st Parliament ===
Chandra Herbert sought re-election in the 2017 British Columbia general election and faced BC Liberal Nigel Elliott, BC Green James Marshall, and Libertarian John Clarke. He won with slightly more than 60% of the vote. His party began the 41st Parliament of British Columbia as the Official Opposition but the BC Liberal minority government lost a confidence vote and, effective July 2017, the BC NDP formed a minority government based on a confidence-and-supply agreement with the BC Green Party. Premier John Horgan created the Rental Housing Task Force consisting of Chandra Herbert and fellow MLAs Ronna-Rae Leonard and Adam Olsen to report to Minister of Municipal Affairs and Housing Selina Robinson with recommendations to review and update the provincial government's residential tenancy laws and policies, which had not been changed substantially in 16 years. Beginning in June 2018, the task force traveled to 10 cities across the province and provided a suite of recommendations in December to mixed reviews.

==== Allegations of improper use of public funds ====
In 2023, Chandra Herbert faced allegations of improper use of public funds and failure to report his residency to his constituents. It was reported that he had claimed over $70,000 in travel expenses, including flights, hotels, and meals, over a two-year period. Chandra Herbert defended his expenses as necessary for his work as an MLA and committee chair. He noted that his expenses had been audited and approved by the Legislative Assembly's financial officers.

== Electoral history ==
2024 British Columbia general election: Vancouver-West End
Party	Candidate	Votes	%	±%	Expenditures
New Democratic	Spencer Chandra Herbert	13,143	63.0%	+0.69	
Conservative	Jon Ellacott	5,677	27.2%	–	
Green	Eoin O'Dwyer	1,893	9.1%	−7.18	
Independent	Carl Turnbull	144	0.7%		
Total valid votes			–		
Total rejected ballots					
Turnout					
Registered voters					
New Democratic hold		Swing		–	
Source: Elections BC

2020 British Columbia general election: Vancouver-West End
Party	Candidate	Votes	%	±%	Expenditures
New Democratic	Spencer Chandra Herbert	12,439	62.31	+1.34	$25,256.82
Liberal	Jon Ellacott	4,014	20.11	−2.89	$13,290.51
Green	James Marshall	3,250	16.28	+2.38	$6,243.74
Libertarian	Kim McCann	259	1.30	−0.30	$123.85
Total valid votes		19,962	100.00	–	
Total rejected ballots		104	0.52	+0.13	
Turnout		20,066	51.77	–4.76	
Registered voters		38,762			
New Democratic hold		Swing		+2.12	
Source: Elections BC

2017 British Columbia general election: Vancouver-West End
Party	Candidate	Votes	%	±%	Expenditures
New Democratic	Spencer Chandra Herbert	13,420	60.97	+4.16	$45,663
Liberal	Nigel Elliott	5,064	23.00	−5.25	$43,628
Green	James Marshall	3,059	13.90	+2.51	$2,132
Libertarian	John Clarke	352	1.60	−0.76	$0
Independent	Leon David Dunn	116	0.53	–	$282
Total valid votes		22,011	100.00	–	
Total rejected ballots		87	0.39	−0.20	
Turnout		22,098	56.53	+5.89	
Registered voters		39,094			
Source: Elections BC

2013 British Columbia general election: Vancouver-West End
Party	Candidate	Votes	%	±%	Expenditures
New Democratic	Spencer Chandra Herbert	10,755	56.81	+0.30	$80,612
Liberal	Scott Harrison	5,349	28.25	−4.40	$27,424
Green	Jodie Emery	2,156	11.39	+2.38	$3,295
Libertarian	John Clarke	446	2.36	+1.24	$250
No Affiliation	Ronald Guillermo Herbert	132	0.70	–	$361
Work Less	Mathew David Kagis	94	0.50	–	$250
Total valid votes		18,932	100.00	–	
Total rejected ballots		112	0.59	+0.05	
Turnout		19,044	50.64	+0.71	
Registered voters		37,609			
Source: Elections BC

2009 British Columbia general election: Vancouver-West End
Party	Candidate	Votes	%	Expenditures
New Democratic	Spencer Chandra Herbert	9,926	56.51	$65,124
Liberal	Laura McDiarmid	5,735	32.65	$43,941
Green	Drina Read	1,582	9.01	$2,742
Libertarian	John Clarke	196	1.12	$250
Sex	Scarlett Lake	90	0.51	$250
Non-affiliated	Menard D. Caissy	36	0.20	$317
Total valid votes		17,565	100	
Total rejected ballots		96	0.54	
Turnout		17,661	49.93	
Registered voters		35,370		

British Columbia provincial by-election, October 29, 2008: Vancouver-Burrard
Party	Candidate	Votes	%	±%	Expenditures
New Democratic	Spencer Herbert	6,998	50.67	+8.57	$62,474
Liberal	Arthur Griffiths	5,089	36.85	−5.24	$91,934
Green	Drina Read	741	5.37	−7.70	$2,788
Conservative	Ian McLeod	599	4.34	–	$2,379
Marijuana	Marc Emery	384	2.78	–	$1,840
Total valid votes		13,811	100		
Total rejected ballots		26	0.19		
Turnout		13,837	23.21		
