= Sex party =

Sex party may refer to:

- Sex party (group sex), a group gathering at which sexual activity takes place
- Australian Sex Party, an Australian political party founded in 2009
- The Sex Party, a political party based in British Columbia, Canada
