= Work Less Party =

Canadian Political Party

- Former party
- Leader: Jessica Mason-Paull (at time of dissolution)
- Founded: October 1, 2007
- Dissolved: July 31, 2010
- Headquarters: 1545 10th Avenue East; Vancouver, British Columbia
- Ideology: Shortening of the working week Labour rights Decentralization; Environmentalism
- Colours: Red

Website
- www.worklessparty.org

The Work Less Party (WLP) was a Canadian federal political party that became eligible for registration with Elections Canada on October 1, 2007.

The federal Work Less Party was voluntarily de-registered on July 31, 2010, after applying for and being granted an extension to the June 30, 2010 deadline for filing a 2009 financial return to Elections Canada. The federal Work Less Party is no longer able to issue tax receipts for political contributions.

The party had a provincial branch in British Columbia, the Work Less Party of British Columbia, and a wing that operated on the municipal level in Vancouver.

== History ==
The WLP was formed as a provincial and municipal party in British Columbia by Conrad Schmidt in 2003. In October 2004 Schmidt gave up his day job to be able to give more attention to the party. A federal wing was registered with Elections Canada in 2007. In May 2009, Jessica Mason-Paull became its leader, swapping roles with Schmidt, who then became the Chief Auditor.

The party nominated only a single candidate for the 2008 Canadian federal election. Betty Krawczyk ran unsuccessfully in the riding of Vancouver East, receiving 1.02% of the votes (423 votes). At a national level, this was 0.0013 percent of votes cast.

The party was de-registered at the federal level on July 31, 2010.

== Platform ==
The platform of the Work Less Party was based primarily around the rights of workers. The party advocated for the shortening of the work week to 32 hours from 40, reduction of Canada's carbon footprint, a minimum wage increase, decentralized government, and promotion of cultural activities. Economic ideas underpinning the WLP's policy were discussed in Conrad Schmidt's 2006 book Workers of the World Relax.

== See also ==
- Reduction of hours of work
