= Cariboo-Chilcotin (provincial electoral district) =

Provincial electoral district in British Columbia, Canada

British Columbia electoral district

Provincial electoral district
- Legislature: Legislative Assembly of British Columbia
MLA
Lorne Doerkson
Conservative
- District created: 2008
- First contested: 2009
- Last contested: 2026

Demographics
- Population (2021): 41,302
- Area (km²): 55,800
- Pop. density (per km²): 0.74
- Census division(s): Cariboo, Thompson-Nicola
- Census subdivision(s): 100 Mile House, Ashcroft, Cache Creek, Clinton, Williams Lake

Cariboo-Chilcotin is a provincial electoral district in British Columbia that has been represented in the Legislative Assembly of British Columbia since 2009.

Established under the 2008 electoral redistribution, the district was first contested in the 2009 general election. It was formed from the former electoral district of Cariboo South.

== Demographics ==
Population, 2021	41,302
Area (km^{2})	55,800
Pop. density (people per km^{2})	0.74
Source: BC Electoral Boundaries Commission

== Geography ==
Located in central British Columbia, the district comprises parts of the Cariboo Regional District and Thompson-Nicola Regional District, including the communities of Williams Lake, 100 Mile House, Clinton, Cache Creek and Ashcroft.

== Members of the Legislative Assembly ==
This riding has elected the following members of the Legislative Assembly:

Assembly	Years	Member	Party
Cariboo-Chilcotin; Riding created from Cariboo South
39th	2009–2013	Donna Barnett	Liberal
40th	2013–2017	Donna Barnett	Liberal
41st	2017–2020	Donna Barnett	Liberal
42nd	2020–2023	Lorne Doerkson	Liberal
42nd	2023–2024	Lorne Doerkson	BC United
42nd	2024–2024	Lorne Doerkson	Conservative
43rd	2024–2026	Lorne Doerkson	Conservative
44th	2026–present	Lorne Doerkson	Conservative

== Electoral history ==
2026 British Columbia general election
Party	Candidate	Votes	%	±%	Expenditures
Conservative	Lorne Doerkson	14,218	76.90	+7.31	
New Democratic	Kathryn Askew	3,123	16.89	-19.98	
Green	Douglas Gook	1,103	5.97	–	
Total valid votes		18,444	99.76		
Total rejected ballots		44	0.24		
Turnout					
Registered voters					
Conservative hold		Swing		+13.65	
Source: Elections BC

2024 British Columbia general election
Party	Candidate	Votes	%	±%	Expenditures
Conservative	Lorne Doerkson	13,714	69.59	–	$52,365.03
New Democratic	Michael Moses	5,992	30.41	−1.4	$23,077.93
Total valid votes/expense limit		19,706	99.54	–	$71,700.08
Total rejected ballots		92	0.46	–	
Turnout		19,798	60.04	–	
Registered voters		32,975			
Conservative notional gain from BC United		Swing		–	
Source: Elections BC

2020 provincial election redistributed results
Party	%
Liberal	52.2
New Democratic	31.8
Green	11.1
Others	4.9

2020 British Columbia general election
Party	Candidate	Votes	%	±%	Expenditures
Liberal	Lorne Doerkson	6,600	51.25	−7.52	$29,284.50
New Democratic	Scott Andrews	4,180	32.46	+6.23	$1,965.55
Green	David Laing	1,379	10.71	−4.29	
Independent	Katya Potekhina	457	3.55	–	$1,453.00
Libertarian	James Buckley	263	2.04	–	$0.00
Total valid votes		12,879	100.00	–	
Total rejected ballots					
Turnout					
Registered voters					
Source: Elections BC

2017 British Columbia general election
Party	Candidate	Votes	%	Expenditures
Liberal	Donna Barnett	8,517	58.77	$59,044
New Democratic	Sally Watson	3,801	26.23	$22,988
Green	Rita Helen Giesbrecht	2,175	15.00	$7,708
Total valid votes		14,493	100.00	
Total rejected ballots		103	0.71	
Turnout		14,596	60.79	
Source: Elections BC

2013 British Columbia general election
Party	Candidate	Votes	%
Liberal	Donna Barnett	7,679	56.18
New Democratic	Charlie Wyse	4,740	34.68
Green	Dustin Victor Price	747	5.46
Independent	Gary Young	503	3.68
Total valid votes		13,669	100.00
Total rejected ballots		68	0.50
Turnout		13,737	63.64
Source: Elections BC

B.C. General Election 2009: Cariboo-Chilcotin
Party	Candidate	Votes	%	±	Expenditures
Liberal	Donna Barnett	6,259	47.85%		
New Democratic	Charlie Wyse	6,171	47.18%		
Green	Elli Taylor	650	4.97%		
Total Valid Votes		13,080	100.00%		
Total Rejected Ballots		66			
Turnout		13,146	62.93%		

== See also ==
- List of British Columbia provincial electoral districts
- Canadian provincial electoral districts
