= Walt Cobb =

Canadian politician

Member of the British Columbia Legislative Assembly for Cariboo South
- In office May 16, 2001 – May 17, 2005
- Preceded by: David Zirnhelt
- Succeeded by: Charlie Wyse

Personal details
- Born: 1944 (age 81–82) Manitoba, Canada
- Party: BC Liberal
- Occupation: businessman

Walt Cobb (born 1944) is a Canadian politician, who served as a BC Liberal Member of the Legislative Assembly of British Columbia from 2001 to 2005, representing the riding of Cariboo South.

Cobb was a business owner and municipal politician prior to his election to the legislature. He was returned as mayor in the 2014 BC Municipal election. He has served the City of Williams Lake for ten years as a councillor (1980–1990) and three terms as mayor (1990–1996, 2014–2022).

In November 2021, there was public demand for Cobb's resignation and an official apology following his expression of a controversial viewpoint in a private Facebook post. In his post, Cobb suggested that there are multiple perspectives to consider when examining the history of residential schools.
