= David Zirnhelt =

Canadian politician

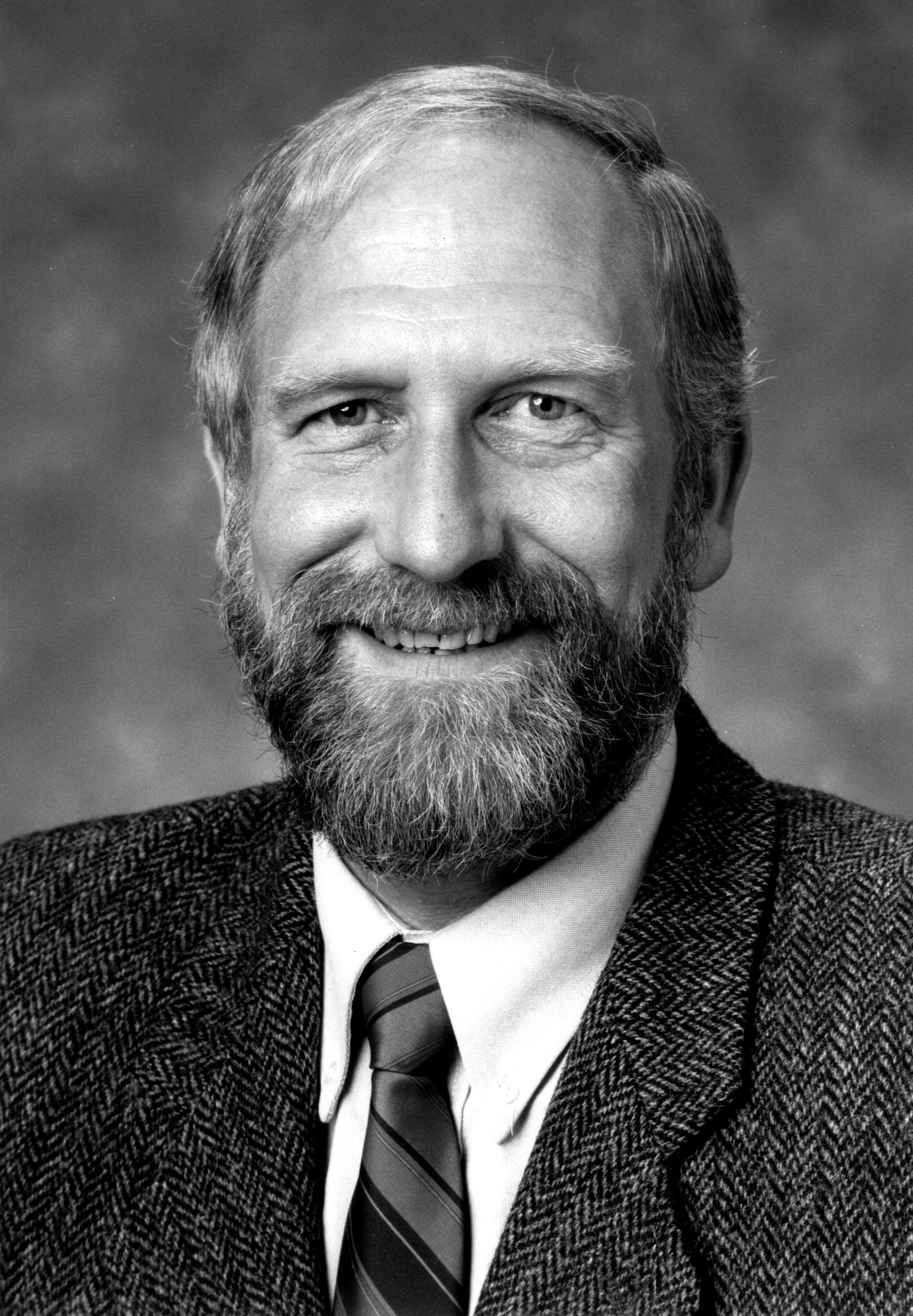

Member of the British Columbia Legislative Assembly for Cariboo South Cariboo (1989–1991)
- In office September 20, 1989 – May 16, 2001
- Preceded by: Alex Fraser
- Succeeded by: Walt Cobb

Minister of Aboriginal Affairs of British Columbia
- In office November 1, 2000 – June 5, 2001
- Premier: Ujjal Dosanjh
- Preceded by: Dale Lovick
- Succeeded by: George Abbott (Community, Aboriginal and Women's Services)

Minister of Forests of British Columbia
- In office June 17, 1996 – February 24, 2000
- Premier: Glen Clark; Dan Miller
- Preceded by: Dennis Streifel
- Succeeded by: Jim Doyle

Minister of Agriculture, Fisheries and Food of British Columbia
- In office September 15, 1993 – June 17, 1996
- Premier: Mike Harcourt; Glen Clark
- Preceded by: Bill Barlee
- Succeeded by: Corky Evans

Minister of Economic Development, Small Business and Trade of British Columbia
- In office November 5, 1991 – September 15, 1993
- Premier: Mike Harcourt
- Preceded by: Howard Dirks (Development, Trade and Tourism)
- Succeeded by: Bill Barlee (Small Business, Tourism and Culture)

Personal details
- Born: 1947 (age 78–79) Williams Lake, British Columbia
- Party: BC New Democrat
- Other political affiliations: BC Liberal (c. 1969)
- Spouse: Susan Zirnhelt
- Education: University of British Columbia
- Occupation: businessman

David Zirnhelt (born 1947) is a Canadian politician, businessman and rancher from British Columbia. A member of the British Columbia New Democratic Party, he was a Member of the Legislative Assembly (MLA) for Cariboo and Cariboo South from 1989 to 2001, and served in the cabinets of premiers Mike Harcourt, Glen Clark, Dan Miller and Ujjal Dosanjh.

== Early life and career ==
Zirnhelt was born in Williams Lake, British Columbia, located in the Cariboo region of the province's central interior. He studied political science and public administration at the University of British Columbia, obtaining a Bachelor of Arts in 1970 and a Master of Arts in 1976. After graduation, Zirnhelt worked as a civil servant in the federal government of Pierre Trudeau as a member of the cabinet secretariat, and later became the British Columbia head of Opportunities for Youth.

He later returned to the Williams Lake area, where he became a cattle rancher and a practitioner of horse logging. He was also active as a consultant in various federal, provincial and First Nations projects related to public policy and economic development.

He and his wife Susan have three sons together.

== Politics ==
Zirnhelt's first entry into politics was in the 1969 British Columbia general election, where he stood as a candidate for the Liberal Party in the riding of Cariboo. He was unsuccessful in his run, placing third against victor Alex Fraser. Fraser's widow later recalled that despite his resounding victory, Fraser was impressed with Zirnhelt and that "if he was older [he] might have given him some trouble."

He was a director of the Cariboo Regional District from 1974 to 1977. In 1987, he was elected as a trustee of the Cariboo-Chilcotin School District. In 1989, following the death of Alex Fraser, Zirnhelt stood in the resulting by-election for Cariboo, this time as a member of the social democratic New Democratic Party. He won the election in an upset; the riding had, until then, been a stronghold of the conservative British Columbia Social Credit Party for 37 years. With the abolition of the old Cariboo riding, Zirnhelt went on to be re-elected in 1991 and 1996 in the riding of Cariboo South.

With the election of a New Democratic government in 1991, Premier Mike Harcourt appointed Zirnhelt minister of economic development, small business and trade. He was named minister of agriculture, fisheries and food in September 1993, and initially remained in that post when Glen Clark took over as premier from Harcourt in February 1996. Following the 1996 election, Clark appointed Zirnhelt minister of forests — a powerful portfolio in a province where forestry is a major economic sector. In that position, Zirnhelt initiated an intensive review of the province's forest practices, as concerns mounted over the logging of old growth forests and the insufficient restocking of logged areas by timber companies.

After Clark's resignation in August 1999, Zirnhelt retained the forestry portfolio in Dan Miller's cabinet. With Ujjal Dosanjh sworn in as premier in February 2000, Zirnhelt was initially without a cabinet post. However, he was named minister of aboriginal affairs that November to replace Dale Lovick, who was dropped from the cabinet after declining to run again in the 2001 provincial election.

Zirnhelt failed in his attempt at re-election in 2001. In 2024, he became president of the Cariboo Cattlemen’s Association.
