= Charlie Wyse =

Canadian politician and educator

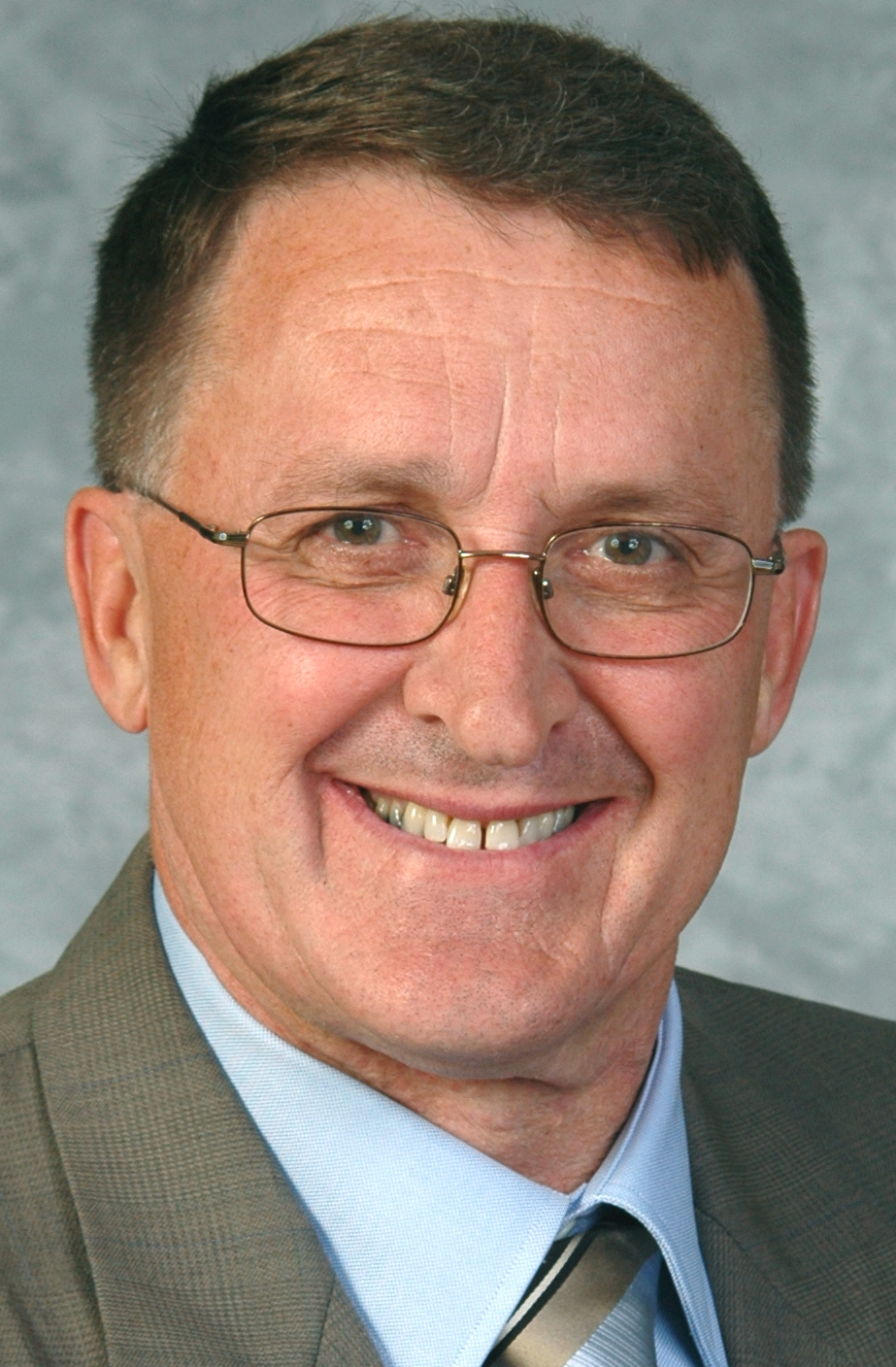

MLA for Cariboo South
- In office 2005–2009
- Preceded by: Walt Cobb
- Succeeded by: riding dissolved

Personal details
- Born: 1946 or 1947 (age 79–80)
- Party: BC NDP

Charlie Wyse (born September 12, 1946) is an educator and former Canadian politician, who was a New Democratic Member of the Legislative Assembly in British Columbia from 2005 to 2009. He represented the riding of Cariboo South. He had earlier been an unsuccessful candidate in the 1986 provincial election, running in the then two-seat Cariboo riding for the Progressive Conservatives.

Wyse, a teacher until 2004, served 23 years as a member of the city council for Williams Lake.

He ran in the newly created riding of Cariboo-Chilcotin for the 2009 election. He was initially declared the winner on election night, but was subsequently declared defeated by BC Liberal challenger Donna Barnett after a recount. He was also defeated by Barnett in the 2013 provincial election.

== Electoral record ==
2013 British Columbia general election: Cariboo-Chilcotin
Party	Candidate	Votes	%
Liberal	Donna Barnett	7,679	56.18
New Democratic	Charlie Wyse	4,740	34.68
Green	Dustin Victor Price	747	5.46
Independent	Gary Young	503	3.68
Total valid votes		13,669	100.00
Total rejected ballots		68	0.50
Turnout		13,737	63.64
Source: Elections BC
