= Donna Barnett =

Canadian politician

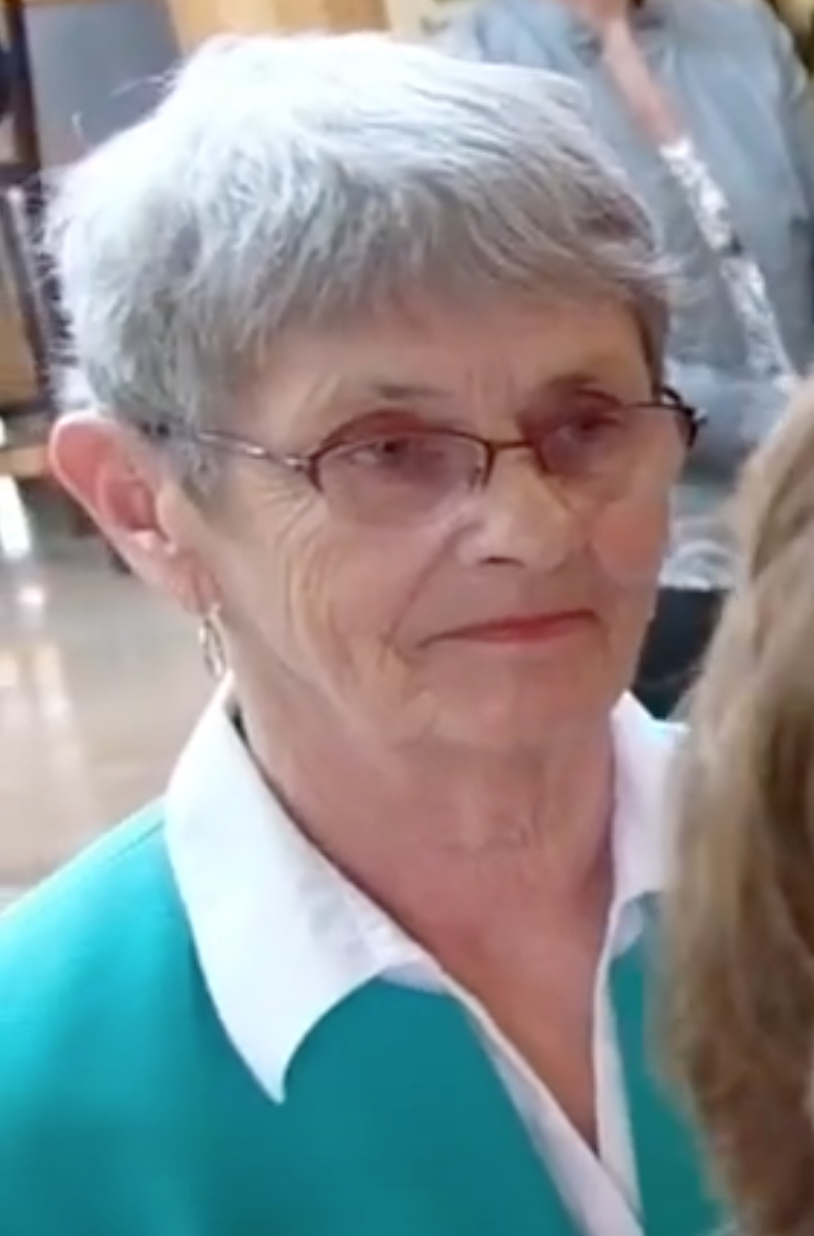

Minister of State for Rural Economic Development
- In office October 21, 2016 – July 18, 2017
- Preceded by: Ministry Established
- Succeeded by: Ministry Abolished

Member of the British Columbia Legislative Assembly for Cariboo-Chilcotin
- In office May 12, 2009 – September 21, 2020
- Preceded by: Riding Established
- Succeeded by: Lorne Doerkson

Personal details
- Born: 1942 or 1943 (age 83–84)
- Party: BC Liberal

Donna Barnett (born 1942 or 1943) is a Canadian politician, who was elected to the Legislative Assembly of British Columbia in the 2009 election. She was elected as a BC Liberal member, representing the newly created riding of Cariboo-Chilcotin.

She was initially declared defeated on election night in 2009, but was subsequently declared elected over British Columbia New Democratic Party MLA Charlie Wyse after a recount.

Prior to her election to the legislature, Barnett served for 16 years as mayor of 100 Mile House.

In January 2020, Donna Barnett announced she would not run in the next provincial election. In October 2022, she was elected to the municipal council for 100 Mile House.

== Electoral record ==
2017 British Columbia general election: Cariboo-Chilcotin
Party	Candidate	Votes	%	Expenditures
Liberal	Donna Barnett	8,517	58.77	$59,044
New Democratic	Sally Watson	3,801	26.23	$22,988
Green	Rita Helen Giesbrecht	2,175	15.00	$7,708
Total valid votes		14,493	100.00	
Total rejected ballots		103	0.71	
Turnout		14,596	60.79	
Source: Elections BC

2013 British Columbia general election: Cariboo-Chilcotin
Party	Candidate	Votes	%
Liberal	Donna Barnett	7,679	56.18
New Democratic	Charlie Wyse	4,740	34.68
Green	Dustin Victor Price	747	5.46
Independent	Gary Young	503	3.68
Total valid votes		13,669	100.00
Total rejected ballots		68	0.50
Turnout		13,737	63.64
Source: Elections BC

B.C. General Election 2009: Cariboo-Chilcotin
Party	Candidate	Votes	%	±	Expenditures
Liberal	Donna Barnett	6,259	47.85%		
New Democratic	Charlie Wyse	6,171	47.18%		
Green	Elli Taylor	650	4.97%		
Total Valid Votes		13,080	100.00%		
Total Rejected Ballots		66			
Turnout		13,146	62.93%		

B.C. General Election 1991: Cariboo South
Party	Candidate	Votes	%	±	Expenditures
NDP	David Zirnhelt	6,369	45.37%		$44,267
Social Credit	Donna Barnett	4,730	33.70%	–	$56,893
Liberal	Erno Krajczar	2,567	18.29%		$4,074
Reform	Phil Lindenbach	371	2.64%		$2,703
Total Valid Votes		14,037	100.00%		
Total Rejected Ballots		316	2.20%		
Turnout		14,353	72.94%		

British Columbia provincial government of Christy Clark
Cabinet post (1)
Predecessor	Office	Successor
Ministry Established	Minister of State for Rural Economic Development; October 21, 2016–July 18, 2017	Ministry Abolished
