= The Sex Party =

- Former provincial party
- Leader: John Ince
- Founded: March 2005
- Dissolved: December 2012
- Headquarters: 2050 Nelson Street; Vancouver, British Columbia
- Ideology: Sex-positive; Civil libertarianism
- Colours: Pink

Website
- Official website

The Sex Party was a political party based in British Columbia, Canada. The party was guided by the philosophy of the sex-positive movement. Among other points, the party advocated for reform of sex education in schools so that sexual issues are taught more gradually over time and included a more comprehensive coverage of them. They advocated for the repeal of laws that promote antisexualism, such as prostitution laws and censorship. They also supported making Valentine's Day a statutory holiday and renaming Victoria Day to Eros Day.

The Sex Party was active for nearly eight years, between March 2005 and December 2012 when it de-registered with Elections BC. Its leader was John Ince, a Vancouver lawyer, author of The Politics of Lust and small business owner. He was one of three candidates representing The Sex Party in the May 2005 provincial election and one of the party's three candidates in the 2009 provincial election. None of its candidates won an election. The party attempted to become active in the 2006 federal election but encountered resistance from Canada Post, which refused to distribute its election material. The Sex Party challenged the Canada Post decision in federal court. The judgement found that Canada Post was within its rights to reasonably restrict (within that specific ad-mail program) material that was sexually explicit but that its application to the party's election material was improper. The court then ordered Canada Post to re-write its policy regarding sexually explicit material in that program.

== Political positions ==
The Sex Party was guided by the philosophy of sex-positivism. While the party did not maintain a full slate of policy positions, both its federal and provincial election platforms have three goals: reform of how sex education is taught, "repeal sex-negative laws and regulations, and support sex-positive community". Regarding education the party advocated for a restructuring of sex education in public schools so that it is taught gradually, rather than all in one class, and would include other aspects of human sexuality, like non-coital contact, emotional intimacy, and LGBT issues. The Sex Party wanted provincial funding directed at research into sexuality policy issues and an expansion University of British Columbia's Critical Studies in Sexuality program into an entire department. Regarding sex-negative laws, The Sex Party wanted to work towards undoing legislation and regulations that support antisexualism. This included legalizing prostitution, starting a Sex Worker Empowerment Program to counsel and educate sex workers, reserving areas on public parks and beaches for nudists, allowing for sexually explicit private gatherings, (uncensored) films, and entertainment, and repealing provisions that allow municipalities to prohibit the sale of sex toys. Regarding sex-positive community issues, The Sex Party wanted to enable residents of long-term care facilities to express their sexuality in a safe, respectful and dignified manner, create a Sex Positive Press Council to expose and remove censorship, make Valentine's Day a statutory holiday, and rename Victoria Day to Eros Day.

== 2005 provincial election ==
The Sex Party was registered with Elections BC in March 2005 with its founder, John Ince, also acting as the party leader. Ince was a Vancouver lawyer, author and co-owner of a store that hosted educational seminars and artistic shows about human sexuality, as well as selling sex-themed merchandise. He had been critical of government laws that perpetuated or resulted in harmful attitudes towards sex-related issues. Ince previously authored a non-fiction book, The Politics of Lust, which addresses the impact of antisexual attitudes or erotophobia on a society's political organization. The party launched its election platform and candidates at a press conference at the Vancouver Public Library in April.

The party nominated three candidates in the May 17, 2005 provincial election, none of whom were elected:

- John Ince in Vancouver-Burrard,
- Sex educator and small business owner Yvonne Tink in Vancouver-Kingsway,
- Patrick Clark, a man living with cerebral palsy who sought to raise awareness about the sex lives of people living with disabilities, in Vancouver-Fairview.

Prior to the election, the party held a fundraiser which featured erotic art meant to illustrate political themes and a performance piece involving couples having sex behind a screen, erotic poetry, and body painting. After employees of the Liquor Control and Licensing Branch told Ince that the art installation would likely result in the refusal of a special event liquor licence, the party asked for judicial review. Both a provincial court and an appeal court refused the review because an actual application had not been submitted for a decision to be reviewed, and the fundraiser went ahead with the serving of alcohol.

== Federal campaign and Canada Post lawsuit ==
The party intended to participate in the 2006 federal election. They prepared a pamphlet and sent it to Canada Post to deliver via their Unaddressed Admail Program. The Canada Post employees rejected the pamphlet because their policy document, the Unaddressed Admail Customer Guide, allowed them to refuse to deliver sexually explicit material. The four-page pamphlet had several images depicting people in the nude and objects shaped like human body parts, and because the pamphlet also contained the party's election platform, they complained that Canada Post was violating its directive to be politically impartial. The Sex Party objected to the refusal by filing a lawsuit against Canada Post saying the organization violated their right to freedom of expression. The Federal Court of Canada ruled that the "sexually explicit material" phrase used in the Canada Post policy document was undefined and too vague to be arbitrarily applied to any particular pamphlet. The Court found that their freedom of expression was reasonably restricted, and not prohibited, as Canada Post did offer alternative means of distribution. The judgement, which was delivered in January 2008, ordered Canada Post to rewrite its policy regarding sexually explicit material.

== 2009 provincial election ==
The party nominated three candidates in the May 2009 provincial election, none of whom were elected:

- John Ince in Vancouver-Point Grey,
- Scarlett Lake, president of an escort agency, in Vancouver-West End,
- Dietrich Pajonk, co-owner of a condom distribution company, in Vancouver-Hastings.

== Election results ==
In the 2005 provincial election, the party had three candidates. John Ince stood in the Vancouver-Burrard riding but got only 111 votes (0.39%), losing to the incumbent BC Liberal Lorne Mayencourt. In Vancouver-Fairview, The Sex Party candidate was Patrick Clark who received 121 votes (0.43%), losing to the BC NDP candidate Gregor Robertson. In Vancouver-Kingsway, their candidate was Yvonne Tink, who received 73 votes (0.37%), losing to the NDP candidate Adrian Dix.

In the 2009 provincial election, the party nominated candidates in three ridings. John Ince stood in the Vancouver-Point Grey riding but got only 130 votes (0.56%), coming in last place, losing to BC Liberal leader and Premier Gordon Campbell. In Vancouver-Hastings, The Sex Party candidate was Dietrich Pajonk. He came in last with 99 votes (0.51%), losing to the incumbent NDP candidate Shane Simpson. In Vancouver-West End, their candidate was the operator of an escort business, Scarlett Lake, who received 90 votes (0.51%), losing to the NDP candidate Spencer Chandra Herbert.

Election	Candidates	Total votes	Popular vote	Riding	Candidate	Votes	Popular vote in riding
2005	3	305	0.02%				
2005	3	305	0.02%	Vancouver-Burrard	John Ince	111	0.39%
2005	3	305	0.02%	Vancouver-Fairview	Patrick Clark	121	0.43%
2005	3	305	0.02%	Vancouver-Kingsway	Yvonne Tink	73	0.37%
2009	3	684	0.04%				
2009	3	684	0.04%	Vancouver-Hastings	Dietrich Pajonk	99	0.51%
2009	3	684	0.04%	Vancouver-Point Grey	John Ince	130	0.57%
2009	3	684	0.04%	Vancouver-West End	Scarlett Lake	90	0.51%

== Finances ==
In the 2005 provincial election, the party reported $1,283 in general election expenditures, while all three candidates reported $100 each in expenditures.

In 2009 provincial election the party reported $750 in general election expenditures. Dietrich Pajonk reported spending $269, while John Ince and Scarlett Lake each reported $250. The party de-registered with Elections BC effective December 21, 2012, five months prior to the 2013 provincial election.

Annual Financial Report
Year	Income	Expenses	Assets	Reference
2005	$5,882	$4,878	$1,513	
2006	$551	$1,338	$686	
2007	$704	$664	$1,390	
2008	$851	$238	$977	
2009	$1,427	$1,058	$916	
2010	$502	$87	$155	
2011	$104	$70	$189	
2012	$2	$192	$0	

Election Expenses
Election	Income	Expenses	Surplus/Deficit	Reference
2005	$4,781	$1,283	$3,498	
2009	$750	$750	$0	

== See also ==
- List of political parties in British Columbia
