= John Ince (author) =

Canadian activist and writer (born 1952)

- Born: May 30, 1952 (age 74); Canada
- Occupations: Author and lawyer
- Known for: Sex-positive activism

John Ince (born May 30, 1952) is a Canadian author, lawyer, entrepreneur and from 2005 to 2012 activist in the sex-positive movement.

== Legal career ==
Ince began practicing law in the early 1980s focusing on environmental issues but gradually moved to the human rights field, specializing in sexual issues. He represented performers and individual citizens fighting sexual censorship laws. One of his cases, Luscher v. Canada successfully struck down as unconstitutional a federal law that for over one hundred years had prohibited sexual material from entering Canada. He represented the Canadian polyamory community in the 2011 constitutional reference case concerning Canada’s polygamy laws.

== Sex-positive activism ==
In 2002, Ince opened The Art of Loving, a sex shop in Vancouver, British Columbia, Canada. It sells art, instructional books and videos and pleasure products. It also produces sexual seminars, some led by Ince. He produced an erotic event at The Art of Loving that garnered international media attention in 2003.

In 2005, Ince and many other erotic arts activists founded The Sex Party, the world’s first officially registered sex-positive political party. Ince was party leader from 2005 until 2012. He and others ran as candidates in two provincial general elections in 2005 and 2009.
