= Conrad Schmidt (social activist) =

Canadian activist, filmmaker and writer

Conrad Schmidt (born 1969) is a social activist, filmmaker and writer living in Vancouver, British Columbia, Canada, who is known for his role in founding the Work Less Party of British Columbia and for creating the internationally known World Naked Bike Ride protest.

== Biography ==
Schmidt was born and raised in South Africa and, in 1998, moved to Vancouver where he resides.

== Community involvement ==
In 2003, Schmidt organized a protest in which 50 demonstrators from Artists Against War formed a peace sign with their naked bodies to protest against possible US action in Iraq. Schmidt created the international clothing-optional World Naked Bike Ride (WNBR) in 2004.

In 2003, Schmidt was a co-ordinator for the Work Less Party of British Columbia, a political party which advocated for a 32-hour work week and reduced consumerism.

== Media activities ==
Schmidt is the author of Workers of the World Relax: The Simple Economics of Less Industrial Work (ISBN 0973977205) and Efficiency Shifting, and the director of the documentary, Five Ring Circus.

== See also ==
- Affluenza
- Anti-consumerism
- 2008 Canadian federal election
- Work Less Party
