= Work Less Party of British Columbia =

- Historical provincial party
- Leader: Conrad Schmidt
- Founded: July 7, 2003
- Dissolved: May 3, 2017
- Headquarters: 1545 10 Ave E Vancouver, British Columbia; V5N 1X6
- Ideology: Workers rights Anti-consumerism
- Colours: Red

Website
- www.worklessparty.org

The Work Less Party was a political party in the Canadian province of British Columbia. The party was founded in 2003 by Conrad Schmidt and de-registered in May 2017. The primary aim of this party was to move to a 32-hour work week and its party slogan was "Work Less, Consume Less, Live More." The slogan describes the party's aim to encourage people to reduce their consumption, to be more environmentally and socially conscious, and to focus on real values. Instead of consuming, people are encouraged to spend time on family, friends, community engagement, art and creative endeavours, spiritual exploration, and athletic activities.

The Work Less Party nominated eleven candidates for the May 2005 provincial election, who won a total of 1,642 votes (0.09% of the provincial total). None of the candidates were elected. In the 2009 provincial election, the party nominated two candidates who combined for 322 votes (0.02% of the provincial total). The party has also participated in municipal politics. Ben West ran for mayor of Vancouver in the November 2005 election, receiving 1,907 votes (1.47%). In the next Vancouver mayoral election, in November 2008, Betty Krawczyk ran for mayor under the Work Less Party platform, as did four people for councillor positions, though none were elected.

The party had a federal wing, called the Work Less Party, between October 2007 and July 2010. The federal Work Less Party nominated one candidate: Betty Krawczyk in the Vancouver East electoral district during the October 2008 federal election.

== Policy ==
The party's main ideals revolved around the idea of legislating a 32-hour, or four-day work week. Their belief was that reducing the work week from five days to four would result in a lower unemployment rate, more time for family and leisure activities, and less unnecessary consumerism, at the cost of slightly less pay for workers. Other policy points included controls on rents and property costs, higher taxes on luxury goods, the promotion of arts, education, sports and research, prohibiting unpaid overtime work, and changing to the payroll tax system to encourage hiring additional workers.

In 2005, the party stated its goal was to "champion the economic, environmental and social advantages of a reduced work week".

== Background ==
The Work Less Party of British Columbia was founded by Conrad Schmidt on July 7, 2003. The 34-year-old permanent resident of Canada, from Johannesburg, South Africa, was living in Vancouver working as a computer programmer, and had already founded the World Naked Bike Ride and organized events for the non-profit group Artists Against War. He was motivated to start a political party after he linked rampant consumerism's requirement for easy access to resources which he saw as creating wars, like the Iraq War, and causing environmental destruction. He witnessed people suffering work-related stress as they work to purchase unnecessary products while neglecting their families, friends and their social life. Another motivating factor was witnessing, at his place of employment, out-sourcing of work to China where, he was told, they would work six or seven days each week. Schmidt would make advocacy of a reduced work week and championing its economic, environmental and social advantages the premise of the new political party.

== History ==
The party held fundraisers and staged publicity stunts to communicate their ideas and get media attention. Events included masquerade parties, handing out speeding tickets to fast-walking pedestrians, distributing calendars which highlight the three-day weekend, setting up an impromptu living room on the corner of Pender and Burrard Street, and attempting a nap-in at the BC Parliament Buildings (but was quickly stopped by police). As the 2005 provincial election approached, the party recruited 11 candidates, including author Bruce O'Hara in Comox Valley, 48-year-old Gordon Scott in Surrey-Newton and The Georgia Straight-endorsed Ben West in West Vancouver-Capilano. The candidates did not win a seat in the Legislative Assembly with none finishing higher than fifth place in their riding. The BC Student Vote, in which people too young to legally vote select their preferred candidate, selected one Work Less Party candidate: Ben West in West Vancouver-Capilano.

Immediately following the 2005 provincial election, Schmidt registered the party with the City of Vancouver and the District of Saanich to sponsor candidates in the November 2005 municipal elections. In the Vancouver election, Ben West ran for mayor, coming in fourth with 1,907 votes (1.5% of the popular vote). In Saanich, Katrina Herriot ran for a council seat but lost, receiving 1,204 votes.

Schmidt registered a federal version of the party, called Work Less Party, with Elections Canada in October 2007 so it could participate in the next federal election. They recruited one candidate: author and environmental activist Betty Krawczyk who contested the Vancouver East riding. She received 423 votes (1% of the popular vote) in the October 2008 federal election, losing to Libby Davies of the New Democratic Party. The federal party deregistered in July 2010, before the next federal election.

In the November 2008 Vancouver municipal election, the party sponsored one candidate for mayor, four for council and one for the Parks Board. Betty Krawczyk ran for the mayoral position and came in third, receiving 1,346 votes (1.1%). None of the council candidates, which included Paralympian Ian Gregson, were elected but ranged in voting between 11,237 and 7,435 votes. The lone parks board candidate was also not elected even though he received 10,919 votes.

The party only fielded two candidates in the 2009 provincial election: Keston Broughton in Kamloops-North Thompson and Chris Telford in Vancouver-Hastings. The party intended to nominate co-candidate in Kamloops-North Thompson and Kamloops-South Thompson with the intent to have them job-share but Elections BC only allowed one name from each party be on the ballot and the candidates in the Kamloops-South Thompson dropped out. Neither Broughton or Telford were elected, coming in fifth and fourth in their respective ridings.

Schmidt and several of the 2008 council candidates from the Work Less Party registered with the City of Vancouver to participate in the 2011 Vancouver municipal election as a party called De-Growth Vancouver. They fielded three candidates for council, who received between 8,219 (5.68%) and 4,690 (3.24%) votes, none being elected.

== Election results ==
In the 2005 provincial election, the party nominated candidates in 11 ridings: nine in the Metro Vancouver ridings and two on Vancouver Island. The candidates received between a low of 83 votes (in Comox Valley) and a high of 247 votes (in Vancouver-Hastings), though none were elected. The party totaled 1,642 votes (0.09%) making them the seventh place party in terms of popular votes.

In the 2009 provincial election, the party nominated candidates only two candidates: Chris Telford in Vancouver-Hastings and Keston Broughton in Kamloops-North Thompson. Neither were elected as each came in fifth place in their ridings. The party again ran two candidates in the 2013 provincial election but de-registered with Elections BC just prior to the 2017 provincial election.

Election	Candidates	Total votes	Popular vote	Riding	Candidate	Votes	Popular vote in riding
2005	11	1,642	0.09%				
2005	11	1,642	0.09%	Comox Valley	Bruce O'Hara	83	0.26%
2005	11	1,642	0.09%	North Vancouver-Seymour	Christine Ellis	169	0.66%
2005	11	1,642	0.09%	Surrey-Newton	Gordon Scott	123	0.66%
2005	11	1,642	0.09%	Vancouver-Burrard	Lisa Voldeng	170	0.6%
2005	11	1,642	0.09%	Vancouver-Fairview	Janet van Delst	95	0.34%
2005	11	1,642	0.09%	Vancouver-Hastings	Dennise Brennan	198	1.01%
2005	11	1,642	0.09%	Vancouver-Langara	Charlie Brunet-Latimer	152	0.77%
2005	11	1,642	0.09%	Vancouver-Mount Pleasant	Niki Westman	187	0.93%
2005	11	1,642	0.09%	Vancouver-Point Grey	Tom Walker	126	0.46%
2005	11	1,642	0.09%	West Vancouver-Capilano	Ben West	118	0.59%
2009	2	322	0.02%				
2009	2	322	0.02%	Vancouver-Hastings	Chris Telford	198	1.0%
2009	2	322	0.02%	Kamloops-North Thompson	Keston Broughton	124	0.6%

== Finances ==
Annual Financial Report
Year	Income	Expenses	Assets	Reference
2003	$370	$265	$105	
2004	$9,098	$10,465	$1,687	
2005	$24,195	$23,296	$3,052	
2006	$21,188	$20,045	$1,921	
2007	$28,385	$29,760	$2,928	
2008	$37,273	$35,170	$2,808	
2009	$30,316	$23,375	$8,550	
2010	$27,423	$30,595	$5,378	

Election Expenses
Election	Income	Expenses	Surplus/Deficit	Reference
2005	$6,720	$6,385	$335	
2009	$8,189	$8,342	($153)	

== See also ==
- List of British Columbia political parties
- Reduction of hours of work
