= Cariboo South =

Defunct provincial electoral district in British Columbia, Canada

Cariboo South was a provincial electoral district for the Legislative Assembly of British Columbia, Canada, from 1991 to 2009.

== Demographics ==
Population, 2001	35,678
Population Change, 1996–2001	-2.1%
Area (km^{2})	59,757.93
Pop. Density (people per km^{2})	0.60

== Members of the Legislative Assembly ==
Its last member of the Legislative Assembly (MLA) was Charlie Wyse, a former city councillor for Williams Lake. He was first elected in 2005. He represented the New Democratic Party of British Columbia. He ran again in the newly created riding of Cariboo-Chilcotin for the 2009 election and was defeated.

== Election results ==
B.C. General Election 2005: Cariboo South
Party	Candidate	Votes	%	±	Expenditures
NDP	Charlie Wyse	7,277	45.99%		$53,725
Liberal	Walt Cobb	7,163	45.27%		$86,085
Green	Ed Sharkey	851	5.38%	–	$200
Independent	Mike Orr	532	3.36%		$954
Total Valid Votes		15,823	100%		
Total Rejected Ballots		93	0.59%		
Turnout		15,916	67.43%		

B.C. General Election 2001: Cariboo South
Party	Candidate	Votes	%	±	Expenditures
Liberal	Walt Cobb	10,259	62.21%	$59,750	
NDP	David Zirnhelt	4,259	25.83%	$40,430	
Marijuana	Mike Orr	739	4.48%	$744	
Unity	Christopher Matte	598	3.63%	$506	
All Nations	Dan Case	552	3.35%	$6,01	
People's Front	Bruce Broomfield	83	0.50%	$387	
Total Valid Votes		16,490	100.00%		
Total Rejected Ballots		66	0.40%		
Turnout		16,556	74.70%		

B.C. General Election 1996: Cariboo South
Party	Candidate	Votes	%	±	Expenditures
NDP	David Zirnhelt	6,372	41.45%		$40,565
Liberal	Dave Worthy	6,050	39.35%		$67,488
Reform	Jon Wolbers	2,684	17.46%		$13,941
Green	Donald Stuart Rennie	267	1.74%	–	$380
Total Valid Votes		15,373	100.00%		
Total Rejected Ballots		69	0.45%		
Turnout		15,442	70.88%		

B.C. General Election 1991: Cariboo South
Party	Candidate	Votes	%	±	Expenditures
NDP	David Zirnhelt	6,369	45.37%		$44,267
Social Credit	Donna Barnett	4,730	33.70%	–	$56,893
Liberal	Erno Krajczar	2,567	18.29%		$4,074
Reform	Phil Lindenbach	371	2.64%		$2,703
Total Valid Votes		14,037	100.00%		
Total Rejected Ballots		316	2.20%		
Turnout		14,353	72.94%		

== See also ==
- List of British Columbia provincial electoral districts
- Canadian provincial electoral districts
