= Betty Krawczyk =

American author, blogger and environmental activist (1928–2025)

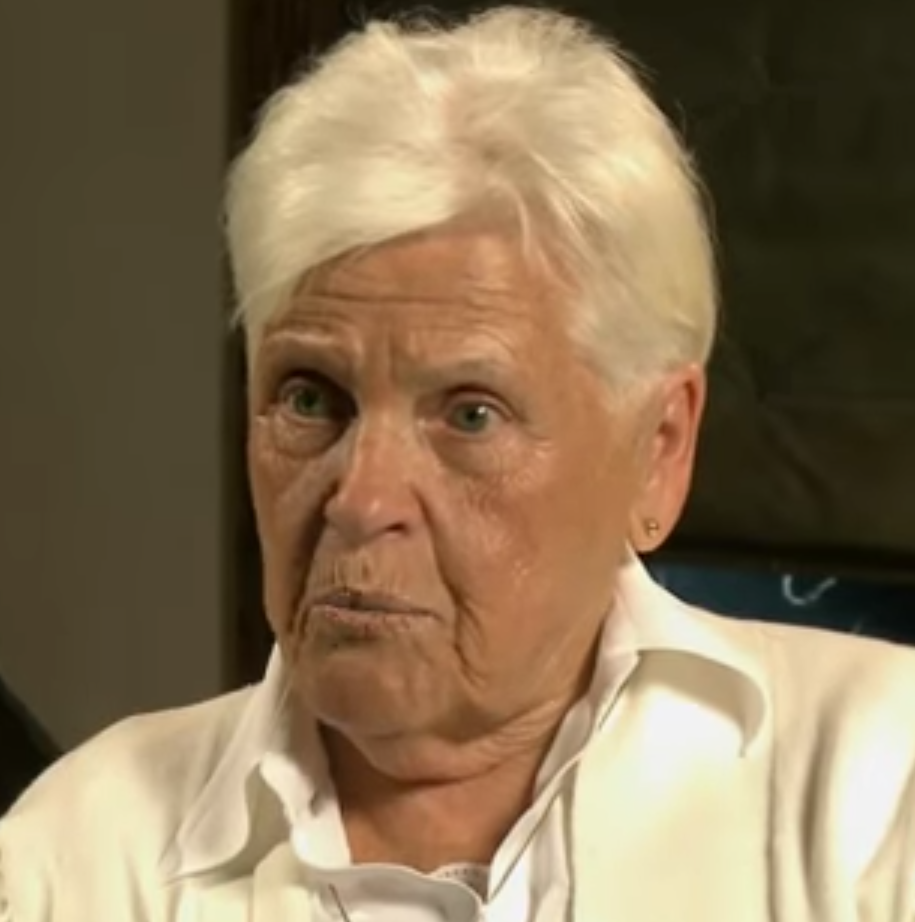
- Krawczyk in 2014
- Born: August 4, 1928; Salinas, California, U.S.
- Died: May 9, 2025 (aged 96); Parksville, British Columbia, Canada
- Occupations: Author, blogger, environmental activist

Betty Shiver Krawczyk (August 4, 1928 – May 9, 2025) was an American author, blogger and environmental activist based in British Columbia, Canada. She identified as an ecofeminist.

Krawczyk is known locally for having been arrested and imprisoned numerous times for defying court orders related to logging and highway developments. On March 5, 2007, she was sentenced to 10 months' imprisonment for her role in protesting highway construction on the Eagleridge Bluffs in West Vancouver.

In the 2001 provincial election, Krawczyk finished third in the riding of Vancouver-Kensington, garnering 9.32 per cent of the popular vote for the Green Party, her highest showing ever. In the 2008 Canadian federal election she ran unsuccessfully in the riding of Vancouver East for the Work Less Party, earning 1.02 per cent of the popular vote.

Krawczyk died after two strokes in Parksville, British Columbia, on May 9, 2025, at the age of 96.

== Bibliography ==
- Clayoquot: The Sound Of My Heart (January 1997)
- Lock Me up or Let Me Go: The Protests, Arrest and Trial of an Environmental Activist and Grandmother (August 2002)
- Open Living Confidential: From Inside the Joint (June 2008)

== See also ==
- Raging Grannies
- Clayoquot Sound
- Harriet Nahanee
