= 45th British Columbia general election =

Upcoming Canadian provincial election

- On or before October 19, 2030

All 93 seats in the Legislative Assembly of British Columbia 47 seats needed for a majority
- Opinion polls

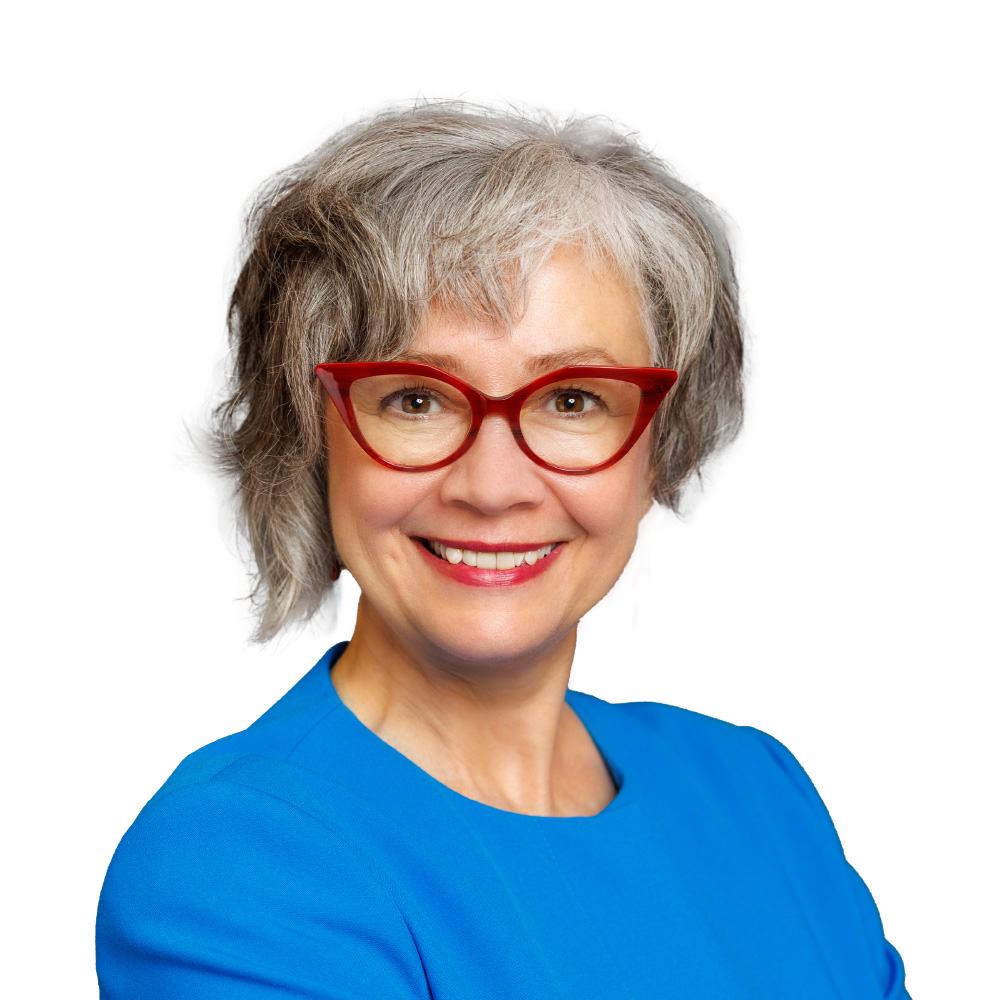

Leader	Lorne Doerkson (interim)	Jennifer Whiteside (interim)	Emily Lowan
Party	Conservative	New Democratic	Green
Leader since	September 20, 2026	October 29, 2026	September 24, 2025
Leader's seat	Cariboo-Chilcotin	New Westminster-Coquitlam	Saanich North and the Islands
Last election	64 seats, 47.71%	27 seats, 37.58%	2 seats, 11.15%
Current seats	64	27	2
Seats needed	Steady	▲19	▲45
Incumbent premier
Lorne Doerkson
Conservative

The 45th British Columbia general election will elect members to the Legislative Assembly of the 45th Parliament of British Columbia. Pursuant to British Columbia's Constitution Act, the election is tentatively scheduled for October 19, 2030, but may be called earlier.

The Conservatives promised to introduce legislation to separate municipal and provincial election dates. As the tentative date overlaps with the 2030 municipal elections, the government may amend the fixed election date law to set a later election date. The latest an election can be held pursuant to Section 4 of the Canadian Charter of Rights and Freedoms is December 20, 2031.

On October 24, 2026, after losing the 2026 British Columbia general election, incumbent premier of British Columbia David Eby announced his resignation as leader of the British Columbia New Democratic Party, effective upon being replaced by his successor.
