= 44th Parliament of British Columbia =

Next provincial legislature of British Columbia

- Majority parliament

Parliament leaders
- Premier: Lorne Doerkson; Nov. 20, 2026 – present
- Cabinet: Doerkson ministry
- Leader of the Opposition: Jennifer Whiteside; Nov. 20, 2026 – present

Party caucuses
- Government: Conservative
- Opposition: New Democratic
- Recognized: Green

Legislative Assembly
- Speaker of the Assembly: Teresa Wat; Nov. 20, 2026 – present
- Government House leader: Trevor Halford; Nov. 20, 2026 – present
- Opposition House leader: TBD; Nov. 20, 2026 – present
- Members: 93 MLA seats

Sovereign
- Monarch: Charles III; Sep. 8, 2022 – present
- Lieutenant governor: Wendy Lisogar-Cocchia; Jan. 30, 2025 – present
← 43rd

The 44th Parliament of British Columbia will be the next legislative term of the Canadian province of British Columbia. It consists of 93 members of the Legislative Assembly of British Columbia elected at the 2026 British Columbia general election held on October 24, 2026 and the lieutenant governor of British Columbia, representing the King of Canada. With 64 of the legislature's 93 seat, the Conservative Party of British Columbia commands a two-third majority in this legislature, with the New Democratic Party and the Green Party in opposition.

The parliamentary majority secured by the Conservative was a remarkable comeback for a party that for many decades was considered essentially a fringe, insignificant party. The sizable government caucus makes the 44th parliament:

- the first BC legislature with Conservatives on the government bench since the 22nd parliament elected in 1949, in which the Conservative Party was the junior partner in the coalition government formed with the British Columbia Liberal Party
- the first BC legislature where the Conservative Party holds the most seat since the 17th parliament elected in 1928, in which Conservative Premier Simon Tolmie led a majority government
- the BC legislature with the largest contingent of Conservative MLAs of any BC legislature (Note: The Conservative held a greater proportion of the seats in the 12th, 13th and 17th parliaments elected respectively in 1909, 1912 and 1928.)

== Composition ==
=== Standing ===
44th British Columbia Parliament - Standing
Party	Leader in legislature	2026 Elxn	Current
Conservative	Lorne Doerkson (interim)	64	64
New Democratic	Jennifer Whiteside (interim)	27	27
Green	Emily Lowan	2	2
Total		93	93
Vacant		–	0

=== Election ===
The composition of the 44th parliament was the outcome of a gamble that went poorly by the previous NDP Premier David Eby. Despite having won a majority mandate (although a bare majority) less than two years prior, Eby called a snap election hoping to strengthen his ministry position in the legislature by exploiting the Conservative Party's internal turmoil following the election and subsequent resignation of Kerry-Lynne Findlay, a former federal cabinet minister in the Harper ministry, as party leader. The opportunistic move was widely criticized and Eby struggled to justify his decision throughout the election campaign.

Ironically, Eby's gambit delivered to the opposition Conservative something that have long elude them – internal reconciliation and party unity. The election call came at the heel of the departures of a third of its caucus members (including its former leader) and occurred just two days after the resignation of its polarizing party leader elected just months earlier. Despite appearing to be on the verge of implosion, the Conservative Party quickly regrouped under the interim leadership of Cariboo-Chilcotin MLA Lorne Doerkson, readmitted most of the exited caucus members into the fold, rebuilt bridges with former Liberal/BC United allies and regained its footing and its polling lead. Conservative caucus' selection of Doerkson, a relatively low profile member elected in 2020 who had declined the interim leadership just a year earlier, proven to be pivotal. The governming NDP have trained its gun on the polarizing Findlay and seemed unable to pivot and calibrate its messaging against the moderate, folksy Doerkson.

The 2026 general election concluded with a net gain of 19 seats for the Conservative Party at the expense of the governing NDP. The BC Green Party maintained its two seats, with its charismatic leader Emily Lowan, who turned 26 just days before the election call, successfully defended one of its seats.

=== Composition Overview ===
First served in (class of) (Note: Inclusive of members subsequently elected via by-election)		Con.	NDP	Green	Total
44th	2026	32	3	1	36
43rd	2024	26	10	1	37
42nd	2020	3	6		9
41st	2017	2	2		4
40th	2013	1	1		2
39th	2009		1		1
38th	2005		3		3
35th	1991		1		1

After two consecutive elections that resulted in significant political realignment, members of the 44th parliament collectively is one of the least experienced group of legislators in British Columbia's history. 35 of the 93 members are rookies with another 38 members who were first elected just two years prior. Only 11 members have served in three or more prior parliaments

Having last formed government almost a century ago in 1928, the Conservative caucus in the 44th parliament have the least prior governing experience of any government caucus in recent memory. 32 of its 64 members were newly elected. Its six most senior caucus members, including Premier Lorne Doerkson, were first elected as Liberals. The retirement of former Conservative leader John Rustad left Richmond-Bridgeport MLA Teresa Wat as the only member in the government caucus with prior ministerial experience (having served as trade minister in the Liberal Christy Clark ministry for four years) and the only members on the government side with more than a decade of service. She was however not included in the Doerkson ministry, but was instead nominated by Doerkson to be Speaker. The next most senior members of the government caucus, Ian Paton and Peter Milobar of the class of 2017 (thus have spent two months on the government bench), and Bruce Banman, Trevor Halford, and Doerkson from the class of 2020, were respectively given the portfolio of agriculture, finance, citizens' services and transportation when Doerkson formed his ministry. The last time a British Columbia government entering office with comparable dearth of governing experience was the W. A. C. Bennett ministry in 1952, when the Social Credit Party contested elections for the first time in the province being led by an Alberta MP who did not contest a seat himself. (Note: Ernest George Hansell, a Social Credit MP for Macleod, was designated by Ernest Manning to be the leader of the BC Social Credit Party during the 1952 election.) That leaderless government caucus selected W. A. C. Bennett, one of only two caucus members with prior experience, to become premier.

The opposition NDP caucus, having been ousted from government recently, consists of a number of legislative veterans, the most experienced among them being Port Coquitlam MLA Mike Farnworth, the party's house leader. First elected in 1995, Farnworth has held the honorary title as the Dean of the legislature since 2020, and have served in the cabinet of five NDP premiers. He is also the only member in this parliament who have staged a successful comeback bid after experiencing electoral defeat. The next most senior opposition members are Vancouver-Renfrew MLA Adrian Dix, a former party leader and cabinet minister, and Burnaby-New Westminster MLA Raj Chouhan, a former speaker. Three other NDP members have previously served on opposition bench through at least one full term, with a seventh having been there for two months after the 2017 election. Sixteen members of its caucus were ministers in the ousted Eby ministry, including seven who also served in the Horgan ministry.

== Presiding officers and parliamentary leaders ==
	Charles III; King of Canada		
Wendy Lisogar-Cocchia; Lieutenant Governor
	Teresa Wat, Richmond-Bridgeport; Speaker		
	Tony Luck, Fraser-Nicola; Deputy Speaker and Chair, Committee of the Whole		
Deputy Chair; Committee of the Whole	Monica Mohan; Delta North	Raj Chouhan; Burnaby-New Westminster	Assistant; Deputy Speaker
Government		Opposition	
Premier	Lorne Doerkson; Cariboo-Chilcotin	Jennifer Whiteside; New Westminster-Coquitlam	Leader of the Opposition
Deputy Premier	Claire Rattée; Skeena	Niki Sharma; Vancouver-Hastings	Opposition; Caucus Chair
Government; House Leader	Trevor Halford; Surrey-White Rock	Mike Farnworth; Port Coquitlam	Opposition; House Leader
Government; Chief Whip	Macklin McCall; West Kelowna-Peachland	TBD	Opposition; Chief Whip
Government; Deputy Chief Whip	Jaime Stein; Vancouver-Langara	Emily Lowan; Saanich North and the Islands	Green Party; Leader
		Jeremy Valeriote; West Vancouver-Sea to Sky	Green Party; House Leader

Vancouver-Point Grey MLA David Eby, incumbent premier since 2022, resigned as NDP leader on election night. The NDP caucus convened three days later on October 29, 2026 and nominated Jennifer Whiteside, MLA for New Westminster-Coquitlam and a cabinet minister since 2020, to be its interim leader. It also named Port Coquitlam MLA Mike Farnworth, a veteran of five different NDP ministries to be its house leader, and Vancouver-Hastings MLA Niki Sharma, the deputy premier in the defeated ministry, to be its caucus chair. Whiteside's nomination was ratified by party's provincial council the following day.

The Conservative Doerkson ministry led by Cariboo-Chilcotin MLA Lorne Doerkson, took office on November 20, 2026. It consisted of 18 ministers and six ministers of state. Doerkson further named 12 parliamentary secretaries. On the same day the premier designated Richmond-Bridgeport MLA Teresa Wat, the only government member with prior ministerial experience, as the government's nominee for the Speakership, and named other Conservative presiding officers and the party's parliamentary officers.

== List of Members ==
█ Conservative █ New Democratic █ Green

Electoral district	Member	Party	First elected (Terms)		Most senior roles
Abbotsford South	Bruce Banman	Conservative	2020	(Note: First elected as a Liberal) 3rd	Minister
Abbotsford West	Korky Neufeld	Conservative	2024	2nd	Minister
Abbotsford-Mission	Darryl Kropp	Conservative	2026	1st	
Boundary-Similkameen	Donegal Wilson	Conservative	2024	2nd	Minister
Bulkley Valley-Stikine	Sharon Hartwell	Conservative	2024	2nd	
Burnaby Centre	Joshua Domnich	Conservative	2026	1st	
Burnaby East	Rohini Arora	NDP	2024	2nd	
Burnaby North	Simon Chandler	Conservative	2026	1st	
Burnaby South-Metrotown	David Xie	Conservative	2026	1st	
Burnaby-New Westminster	Raj Chouhan	NDP	2005	7th	Former speaker
Cariboo-Chilcotin	Lorne Doerkson	Conservative	2020	3rd	Premier
Chilliwack North	Heather Maahs	Conservative	2024	2nd	
Chilliwack-Cultus Lake	Áʼa꞉líya Warbus	Conservative	2024	2nd	Minister
Columbia River-Revelstoke	Scott McInnis	Conservative	2024	2nd	Minister
Coquitlam-Burke Mountain	Ryan Peterson	Conservative	2026	1st	Minister
Coquitlam-Maillardville	Matt Liang	Conservative	2026	1st	
Courtenay-Comox	Will Cole-Hamilton	NDP	2026	1st	
Cowichan Valley	Bert Chen	Conservative	2026	1st	
Delta North	Monica Mohan	Conservative	2026	1st	
Delta South	Ian Paton	Conservative	2017	4th	Minister
Esquimalt-Colwood	Darlene Rotchford	NDP	2024	2nd	
Fraser-Nicola	Tony Luck	Conservative	2024	2nd	
Juan de Fuca-Malahat	Mike Hicks	Conservative	2026	1st	
Kamloops Centre	Peter Milobar	Conservative	2017	4th	Minister
Kamloops-North Thompson	Ward Stamer	Conservative	2024	2nd	Minister of state
Kelowna Centre	Kristina Loewen	Conservative	2024	2nd	Minister
Kelowna-Lake Country-Coldstream	Pavneet Singh	Conservative	2026	1st	
Kelowna-Mission	Gavin Dew	Conservative	2024	2nd	Minister
Kootenay Central	Brittny Anderson	NDP	2020	3rd	Former minister of state
Kootenay-Monashee	Steve Morissette	NDP	2024	2nd	
Kootenay-Rockies	Pete Davis	Conservative	2024	2nd	Minister of state
Ladysmith-Oceanside	Stephanie Higginson	NDP	2024	2nd	
Langford-Highlands	Ravi Parmar	NDP	2023	3rd	
Langley-Abbotsford	Harman Bhangu	Conservative	2024	2nd	Minister of state
Langley-Walnut Grove	Misty Van Popta	Conservative	2024	2nd	
Langley-Willowbrook	Jody Toor	Conservative	2024	2nd	
Maple Ridge East	Lawrence Mok	Conservative	2024	2nd	
Maple Ridge-Pitt Meadows	Doug Morneau	Conservative	2026	1st	
Mid Island-Pacific Rim	Josie Osborne	NDP	2020	3rd	Former minister (Note: member of Horgan ministry and Eby ministry)
Nanaimo-Gabriola Island	Sheila Malcolmson	NDP	2019	4th	Former minister
Nanaimo-Lantzville	George Anderson	NDP	2024	2nd	
Nechako Lakes	Diane Black	Conservative	2026	1st	
New Westminster-Coquitlam	Jennifer Whiteside	NDP	2020	3rd	Leader of the Opposition; former minister
North Coast-Haida Gwaii	Tamara Davidson	NDP	2024	2nd	Former minister
North Island	Anna Kindy	Conservative	2024	2nd	Minister of state
North Vancouver-Lonsdale	Bowinn Ma	NDP	2017	4th	Former minister
North Vancouver-Seymour	Lynne Block	Conservative	2026	1st	Minister
Oak Bay-Gordon Head	Diana Gibson	NDP	2024	2nd	Former minister
Peace River North	Curtis Whitford	Conservative	2026	1st	
Peace River South	Larry Neufeld	Conservative	2024	2nd	Minister
Penticton-Summerland	Tracy St. Claire	Conservative	2026	1st	
Port Coquitlam	Mike Farnworth	NDP	1991	(Note: Was out of office 2001–05 and not a member of the 37th parliament) 9th	Opposition house leader; former minister (Note: member of Glen Clark, Miller, Donsanjh ministries (1996–2001) and Horgan and Eby ministries (2017–26))
Port Moody-Burquitlam	John McEwen	Conservative	2026	1st	
Powell River-Sunshine Coast	Randene Neill	NDP	2024	2nd	Former minister
Prince George-Mackenzie	Kiel Giddens	Conservative	2024	2nd	Minister
Prince George-North Cariboo	Sheldon Clare	Conservative	2024	2nd	
Prince George-Valemount	Rosalyn Bird	Conservative	2024	2nd	
Richmond-Bridgeport	Teresa Wat	Conservative	2013	5th	Speaker; former minister (Note: member of Christy Clark ministry)
Richmond Centre	Sacha Peter	Conservative	2026	1st	
Richmond-Queensborough	Steve Kooner	Conservative	2024	2nd	
Richmond-Steveston	Gordon Zhang	Conservative	2026	1st	
Saanich North and the Islands	Emily Lowan	Green	2026	1st	3rd party leader
Saanich South	Cathie Ounsted	Conservative	2026	1st	Minister
Salmon Arm-Shuswap	David Williams	Conservative	2024	2nd	
Skeena	Claire Rattée	Conservative	2024	2nd	Deputy Premier
Surrey City Centre	Zeeshan Wahla	Conservative	2026	1st	Minister of state
Surrey North	Mandeep Dhaliwal	Conservative	2024	2nd	
Surrey South	Megan Knight	Conservative	2026	1st	
Surrey-Cloverdale	Nicholas Cartmell	Conservative	2026	1st	
Surrey-Fleetwood	Garry Purewal	Conservative	2026	1st	
Surrey-Guildford	Garry Thind	Conservative	2026	1st	
Surrey-Newton	Harj Dhaliwal	Conservative	2026	1st	
Surrey-Panorama	Bryan Tepper	Conservative	2024	2nd	
Surrey-Serpentine River	Jessy Sahota	Conservative	2026	1st	Minister
Surrey-White Rock	Trevor Halford	Conservative	2020	3rd	Minister
Vancouver-Fraserview	Deep Sandhu	Conservative	2026	1st	
Vancouver-Hastings	Niki Sharma	NDP	2020	3rd	Opposition caucus chair; former deputy premier
Vancouver-Kensington	Mable Elmore	NDP	2009	6th	
Vancouver-Langara	Jaime Stein	Conservative	2026	1st	
Vancouver-Little Mountain	Christine Boyle	NDP	2024	2nd	Former minister
Vancouver-Point Grey	David Eby	NDP	2013	5th	Former Premier; NDP leader
Vancouver-Quilchena	Carson Binda	Conservative	2026	1st	Minister of state
Vancouver-Renfrew	Adrian Dix	NDP	2005	7th	Former minister; former NDP leader
Vancouver-South Granville	Lara Honrado	NDP	2026	1st	
Vancouver-Strathcona	Amanda Burrows	NDP	2026	1st	
Vancouver-West End	Spencer Chandra Herbert	NDP	2008	7th	Former minister
Vancouver-Yaletown	Margareta Dovgal	Conservative	2026	1st	
Vernon-Lumby	Kevin Acton	Conservative	2026	1st	
Victoria-Beacon Hill	Grace Lore	NDP	2020	3rd	Former minister
Victoria-Swan Lake	Nina Krieger	NDP	2024	2nd	Former minister
West Kelowna-Peachland	Macklin McCall	Conservative	2024	2nd	
West Vancouver-Capilano	Caroline Elliott	Conservative	2026	1st	Minister
West Vancouver-Sea to Sky	Jeremy Valeriote	Green	2024	2nd	
