= Next British Columbia New Democratic Party leadership election =

Upcoming political party leadership election in Canada

- To be announced
Incumbent leader
Jennifer Whiteside (interim)

Next British Columbia New Democratic Party leadership election
- Date: To be determined
- Resigning leader: David Eby

The next British Columbia New Democratic Party leadership election will select a successor to David Eby, who announced his intention to resign as the British Columbia New Democratic Party leader on October 24, 2026, following the party's defeat in the 2026 British Columbia general election.

== Background ==
Eby became party leader following the 2022 leadership election, succeeding John Horgan as premier. He subsequently led the New Democrats to a narrow majority in the 2024 provincial election.

In September 2026, Eby called a snap election approximately two years before the next scheduled provincial election. He initially argued that a new mandate was needed to address challenges posed by United States president Donald Trump and subsequently cited difficulties advancing the government's agenda in the legislature.

The New Democrats were defeated by the British Columbia Conservatives, led by Lorne Doerkson. During his concession speech on October 24, Eby announced that he would step down as leader, citing the impact of his political career on his family and his wish to spend more time with them.

== Rules and procedures ==
Under Article X of the BC NDP's constitution, the leader is elected by secret ballot of individual party members residing in British Columbia who are in good standing 90 days before the leadership election. BC NDP membership is open to all British Columbia residents who are Canadian citizens or permanent residents and at least 12 years old. Leadership candidates and members nominating them must also have been members in good standing for at least 90 days before the election.

The party's provincial executive develops regulations governing the leadership election and balloting, subject to ratification by the provincial council. The executive may also establish regulations governing the nomination of leadership candidates.

== Timeline ==
=== 2025 ===
- November 15 – David Eby survives his leadership review with 82% support.

=== 2026 ===
- September 22 – Eby announces a snap election to be held on October 24, 2026.
- October 24 – Following the NDP's defeat in the provincial election, David Eby announces his intention to resign as party leader during his concession speech.
- October 29 – New caucus meets for the first time and recommends Jennifer Whiteside as interim leader. She is later approved by the provincial council after some controversy over the process.

== Potential candidates ==
- Christine Boyle, MLA for Vancouver-Little Mountain (2024–present), Minister of Housing and Municipal Affairs (2025–2026), and Minister of Indigenous Relations and Reconciliation (2024–2025)
- Mike Hurley, Mayor of Burnaby (2018–present)
- Ravi Kahlon, MLA for Delta North (2017–2026), Minister of Health (2026), Minister of Jobs and Economic Growth (2025–2026), Minister of Housing and Municipal Affairs (2024–2025), Minister of Housing (2022–2024), and Minister of Jobs, Economic Recovery and Innovation (2020–2022)
- Josie Osborne, MLA for Mid Island-Pacific Rim (2020–present), Minister of Finance (2026), Minister of Health (2024–2026), Minister of Energy, Mines and Low Carbon Innovation (2022–2024), Minister of Land, Water and Resource Stewardship and Minister Responsible for Fisheries (2022), and Minister of Municipal Affairs (2020–2022)
- Ravi Parmar, MLA for Langford-Juan de Fuca (2023–2024) and Langford-Highlands (2024–present), and Minister of Forests (2024–2026)
- Niki Sharma, MLA for Vancouver-Hastings (2020–present), Deputy Premier (2024–2026), and Attorney General (2022–2026)
- Brad West, Mayor of Port Coquitlam (2018–present)

=== Declined ===
- Bowinn Ma, MLA for North Vancouver-Lonsdale (2017–present), Minister of Infrastructure (2024–2026), Minister of Emergency Management and Climate Readiness (2022–2024), and Minister of State for Infrastructure (2020–2022)
- Jennifer Whiteside, MLA for New Westminster (2020–2024) and New Westminster-Coquitlam (2024–present), Minister of Labour (2024–2026), Minister of Mental Health and Addictions (2022–2024), Minister of Education and Child Care (2022), and Minister of Education (2020–2022). Named interim NDP leader on October 29, 2026.
