= Ken Jones (Canadian politician) =

Canadian politician

MLA for Surrey-Cloverdale
- In office 1991–1996

Personal details
- Born: May 11, 1939 (age 87) Port Alberni, British Columbia
- Party: British Columbia Liberal Party

Ken J. E. Jones (born May 11, 1939) was a Canadian politician. He served in the Legislative Assembly of British Columbia from 1991 until his retirement in 1996, as a Liberal member for the constituency of Surrey-Cloverdale.
