= Rob Botterell =

Canadian politician

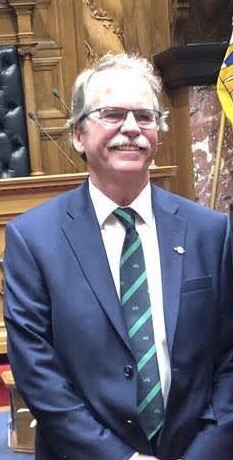
- Botterell in 2024

Member of the Legislative Assembly for Saanich North and the Islands
- In office October 19, 2024 – October 24, 2026
- Preceded by: Adam Olsen
- Succeeded by: Emily Lowan

House Leader of the Green Party of British Columbia
- In office November 12, 2024 – September 22, 2026
- Leader: Sonia Furstenau (2024–2025); Jeremy Valeriote (interim; 2025); Emily Lowan (2025–present)
- Preceded by: Adam Olsen

Personal details
- Party: Green Party
- Profession: Lawyer

Rob Botterell is a Canadian politician who represented the riding of Saanich North and the Islands in the Legislative Assembly of British Columbia as a member of the Green Party of British Columbia. He was first elected in 2024 succeeding retiring Green MLA Adam Olsen. Botterell's victory marked the first time in Canadian history, on either the provincial or federal levels, that a Green politician held a seat left open by a Green predecessor at a general election.

Botterell is a retired lawyer who has represented First Nations governments, and previously worked for the provincial Ministry of Finance.

On September 23, 2026, Botterall announced he would not run for re-election in the snap 2026 British Columbia general election.

== Electoral history ==
2024 British Columbia general election: Saanich North and the Islands
Party	Candidate	Votes	%	±%	Expenditures
Green	Rob Botterell	12,308	36.15	−16.8	$183,083.43
New Democratic	Sarah Riddell	10,958	32.19	+3.6	$97,019.73
Conservative	David Busch	10,145	29.79	–	$128,604.88
Independent	Amy Haysom	635	1.87	–	$4,257.36
Total valid votes		34,046	99.88	–	
Total rejected ballots		41	0.12	−0.34	
Turnout		34,087	68.95	+1.29	
Registered voters		49,437			
Green notional hold		Swing		−10.2	
Source: Elections BC

2001 British Columbia general election: Victoria-Beacon Hill
Party	Candidate	Votes	%	Expenditures
Liberal	Jeff Bray	9,297	37.04	$52,485
New Democratic	Carole James	9,262	36.90	$44,963
Green	Walter Meyer zu Erpen	5,453	21.72	$8,210
Marijuana	Troy Tompkins	532	2.12	$70
Unity	Gregory Paul Michael Hartnell	290	1.15	$3,817
Independent	Rob Botterell	205	0.82	$911
Communist	Kirsten Goodacre	64	0.25	$427
Total valid votes		25,103	100.00	
Total rejected ballots		153	0.53	
Turnout		25,238	68.63	
