= Nicholas Cartmell =

Canadian politician

Nicholas Cartmell MLA

Member of the British Columbia Legislative Assembly for Surrey-Cloverdale
- Incumbent
- Assumed office October 24, 2026
- Preceded by: Elenore Sturko

Personal details
- Party: BC Conservative

Nicholas Cartmell MLA is a Canadian politician and business executive who has served as a member of the Legislative Assembly of British Columbia (MLA) representing the electoral district of Surrey-Cloverdale since 2026. He is a member of the Conservative Party.

== Business career ==
Cartmell previously served as CEO of the BC Sports Hall of Fame, and also the head the business and community engagement roles for the 102nd Grey Cup Festival, as well as a member of the Capilano University Board of Governors.

== Political career ==
Cartmell was nominated by the BC Conservatives to run as their candidate in the electoral district of Surrey-Cloverdale during the 2026 general election. He went on to win the election, defeating his opponents with over 52% of the vote.

== Electoral history ==
2026 British Columbia general election: Surrey-Cloverdale
Party	Candidate	Votes	%	±%	Expenditures
Conservative	Nicholas Cartmell	9,151	52.43	+4.13	
New Democratic	Stephen Dooley	5,846	33.49	-12.11	
Green	Pat McCutcheon	1,314	7.53	+2.13	
CentreBC	Sargy Chima	586	3.36	–	
OneBC	Travis Marchenski	543	3.11	–	
Total valid votes		17,440	99.91		
Total rejected ballots		15	0.09		
Turnout					
Registered voters					
Conservative hold		Swing		+8.12	
Source: Elections BC
