= 2025 Green Party of British Columbia leadership election =

Party election in Canada

- September 24, 2025
- Turnout: 60.86% (▼ ~24.14 pp)
		JK	AB-A
Candidate	Emily Lowan	Jonathan Kerr	Adam Bremner-Akins
Popular vote	3,189	1,908	128
Percentage	60.87%	36.42%	2.44%
Previous leader
Jeremy Valeriote (interim)
Elected leader
Emily Lowan

2025 Green Party of British Columbia leadership election
- Date: September 24, 2025
- Convention: The Parkside Hotel & Spa, Victoria, British Columbia
- Resigning leader: Sonia Furstenau
- Won by: Emily Lowan
- Ballots: 1
- Candidates: 3
- Entrance fee: $21,000
- Spending limit: $200,000

From September 13 to 23, 2025, members of the Green Party of British Columbia voted to elect a leader to replace Sonia Furstenau, who announced her resignation on January 28, 2025. Jeremy Valeriote was made interim leader following Furstenau's resignation. It was announced that Emily Lowan had won the contest on September 24, 2025, on the first ballot.

== Timeline ==
=== 2024 ===
- October 19 – The 2024 British Columbia general election was held. The Greens elected two members. Sonia Furstenau was defeated in Victoria-Beacon Hill but remained party leader.
- December 12 – The Greens reached a co-operation agreement with the New Democratic Party to work together on common objectives during the 43rd Parliament.

=== 2025 ===
- January 28 – Furstenau resigned. Valeriote was appointed interim leader.
- February 27 – Candidate nomination period opened.
- June 14 – Candidate nomination period closed.
- July 2 – Jonathan Kerr declared his candidacy.
- July 3 – Emily Lowan declared her candidacy.
- July 8 – Adam Bremner-Akins declared his candidacy.
- August 10 – Deadline to register to vote.
- September 13 – A leadership debate was held in Victoria. Online voting began.
- September 23 – Voting closed.
- September 24 – Election results were announced, and Lowan was named as the new leader.

== Candidates ==
=== Declared ===
==== Adam Bremner-Akins ====
Background: BC Green Party candidate in Port Coquitlam (2024) and Coquitlam-Burke Mountain (2020), party provincial councillor (2021–2025), party secretary (2024–2025)
Date announced: July 8, 2025
Website : Website

Endorsements of Adam Bremner-Akins

Individuals

- Sarah Gabrielle Baron, 2022 Green Party of Canada leadership candidate

Municipal politicians

- Samantha Agtarap, Port Moody councillor, BC Green candidate for Port Moody-Burquitlam (2024)
- Stuart Mackinnon, Vancouver Park Board commissioner (2008–2011; 2014–2022), BC Green candidate (2005 Vancouver-Kingsway, 2013 Vancouver-Fraserview)

==== Jonathan Kerr ====
Background: Comox councillor (2018–present), family doctor, and Comox Valley Regional District vice-chair
Date announced: July 2, 2025
Website: Website

Endorsements of Jonathan Kerr

Provincial politicians

- Jane Sterk, former leader of the Green Party of British Columbia (2007–2013), former Esquimalt councillor
- Adriane Carr, co-founder and former leader of the Green Party of British Columbia (1983–1985; 2000–2005), former Vancouver councillor

Municipal politicians

- Nicole Minions, Comox mayor
- Jenn Meilleur, Comox councillor
- Lois Chan-Pedley, Green Party of Vancouver school trustee
- Tanille Johnston, Campbell River councillor, 2025 federal NDP candidate in North Island—Powell River

==== Emily Lowan ====
Background: Climate justice organizer and investigative researcher
Date announced: July 3, 2025
Website: Website

Endorsements of Emily Lowan

Individuals

- Bill Carroll, professor of sociology at the University of Victoria
- Gabor Maté, physician and author
- Anjali Appadurai, New Democratic Party candidate for Vancouver Granville (2021), disqualified BC NDP leadership candidate (2022)
- Grand Chief Stewart Phillip, Union of British Columbia Indian Chiefs president
- Tzeporah Berman, environmental activist
- Severn Cullis-Suzuki, environmental activist
- Mike Hudema, activist
- David Suzuki, science broadcaster and environmental activist

Municipal politicians

- Susan Kim, Victoria councillor
- Sean Orr, Vancouver councillor
- Jeremy Caradonna, Victoria councillor
- Michael Wiebe, former Vancouver councillor

=== Declined ===
- Rob Botterell, MLA for Saanich North and the Islands (2024–2026)
- Jeremy Valeriote, MLA for West Vancouver-Sea to Sky (2024–present)
- Andrew Weaver, Leader of the Green Party of British Columbia (2015–2020), MLA for Oak Bay-Gordon Head (2013–2020)

== Results ==
First ballot
Candidate	Votes	Percentage
Emily Lowan	3,189	60.87%
Jonathan Kerr	1,908	36.42%
Adam Bremner-Akins	128	2.44%
None of the options	14	0.27%
Total valid votes	5,239	99.62%
Total rejected ballots	20	0.38%
Turnout	5,259	60.86%
Eligible voters	8,641	-
