= Jennifer Whiteside =

Canadian politician and trade unionist

Jennifer Whiteside MLA
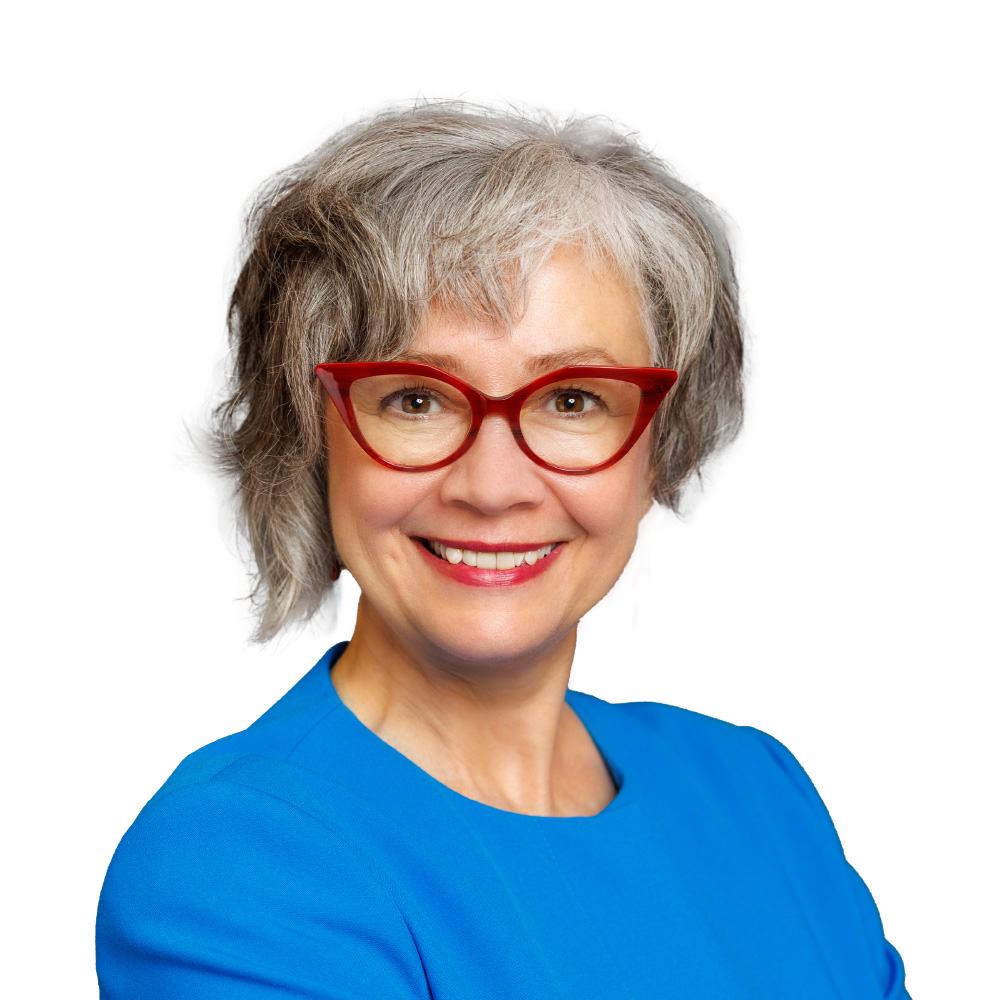
- Whiteside in 2024

Leader of the Opposition of British Columbia
- Incumbent
- Assumed office November 20, 2026
- Preceded by: Lorne Doerkson

Interim Leader of the British Columbia New Democratic Party
- Incumbent
- Assumed office October 29, 2026
- Preceded by: David Eby
Ministerial positions
Minister of Labour of British Columbia
In office November 18, 2024 – November 20, 2026
Premier	David Eby
Preceded by	Harry Bains
Minister of Mental Health and Addictions of British Columbia
In office December 7, 2022 – November 18, 2024
Premier	David Eby
Preceded by	Sheila Malcolmson
Succeeded by	Office redistributed
Minister of Education of British Columbia
In office November 26, 2020 – December 7, 2022
Premier	John Horgan; David Eby
Preceded by	Rob Fleming
Succeeded by	Rachna Singh (Minister of Education and Child Care)

Member of the British Columbia Legislative Assembly for New Westminster-Coquitlam New Westminster (2020–2024)
- Incumbent
- Assumed office October 24, 2020
- Preceded by: Judy Darcy

Personal details
- Born: New Westminster, British Columbia, Canada
- Party: New Democratic
- Education: Douglas College; Simon Fraser University (BA)

Jennifer Whiteside MLA is a Canadian politician and trade unionist who has served as leader of the Opposition of British Columbia and as interim leader of the New Democratic Party since 2026. A member of the Legislative Assembly (MLA), she has represented the electoral district of New Westminster (later redistributed into New Westminster-Coquitlam) since 2020. She served in cabinet under both premiers John Horgan and David Eby from 2020 and 2026.

== Early career and education ==
Born and raised in New Westminster, Whiteside went to New Westminster Secondary School before finishing secondary studies at Burnaby South. She then attended Douglas College before enrolling at Simon Fraser University, graduating with a degree in history.

Prior to entering politics, Whiteside held a variety of positions within the labour movement. She had worked as a researcher with the Hospital Employees' Union (HEU) in BC, the Canadian Union of Public Employees and the Conseil provincial des affaires sociales in Quebec before re-joining the HEU in 2015 as secretary-business manager, also covering duties including chief spokesperson and lead negotiator.

== Political career ==
With incumbent member of the Legislative Assembly (MLA) for New Westminster Judy Darcy declining to seek re-election in 2020, Whiteside decided to contest the BC NDP nomination for the riding. After securing the nomination, she was elected MLA for New Westminster on October 24, 2020 with 60% of the popular vote.

On November 26, 2020, Whiteside was appointed Minister of Education in the cabinet of Premier John Horgan. On December 7, 2022, she was named Minister of Mental Health and Addictions by Premier David Eby.

In the 2024 British Columbia general election, she stood in the new district of New Westminster-Coquitlam.

=== Interim leader of the BC NDP ===
Following the resignation of David Eby after the New Democratic Party's defeat in the snap 2026 general election, Whiteside was appointed interim leader of the party until a new leader is elected in the next leadership election.

== Election history ==
2026 British Columbia general election: New Westminster-Coquitlam
Party	Candidate	Votes	%	±%	Expenditures
New Democratic	Jennifer Whiteside	10,309	50.38		
Conservative	Michele Lau	6,960	34.01		
Green	Maureen Curran	3,084	15.07		
Unaffiliated	Gerry Lenoski*	—	—	—	
Total valid votes		20,353	99.46		
Total rejected ballots		110	0.54		
Turnout		20,463			
Registered voters					
New Democratic hold		Swing		−6.63	
Source: Elections BC *Note: Unaffiliated candidate Gerry Lenoski withdrew from the race, but his name remained on the ballot as ballot printing had already begun at the time of his withdrawal. Election officials informed voters at voting places that Lenoski had withdrawn as a candidate.

2024 British Columbia general election: New Westminster-Coquitlam
Party	Candidate	Votes	%	±%	Expenditures
New Democratic	Jennifer Whiteside	12,757	59.13	–2.0	$38,961.23
Conservative	Ndellie Massey	6,438	29.84	+26.6	$2,659.09
Green	Maureen Curran	2,380	11.03	–7.3	$2,982.41
Total valid votes/expense limit		21,575	99.74	–	$71,700.08
Total rejected ballots		56	0.26	–	
Turnout		21,631	54.05	–	
Registered voters		40,020			
New Democratic notional hold		Swing		–14.3	
Source: Elections BC

2020 British Columbia general election: New Westminster
Party	Candidate	Votes	%	±%	Expenditures
New Democratic	Jennifer Whiteside	15,903	60.25	+8.32	$31,579.21
Green	Cyrus Sy	5,020	19.02	−6.05	$18,803.70
Liberal	Lorraine Brett	4,291	16.26	−4.94	$9,107.81
Conservative	Benny Ogden	912	3.46	–	$0.00
Libertarian	Donald Wilson	269	1.02	+0.30	$0.00
Total valid votes/expense limit		26,395	100.00	–	$66,123.96
Total rejected ballots		146	0.55	+0.16	
Turnout		26,541	56.20	–7.41	
Registered voters		47,226			
New Democratic hold		Swing		+7.19	
Source: Elections BC

British Columbia provincial government of David Eby
Cabinet post (1)
Predecessor	Office	Successor
Sheila Malcolmson	Minister of Mental Health and Addictions; December 7, 2022 –	Incumbent
British Columbia provincial government of John Horgan
Cabinet post (1)
Predecessor	Office	Successor
Rob Fleming	Minister of Education; November 26, 2020 − December 7, 2022	Rachna Singh
