= Jeremy Valeriote =

Canadian politician

Jeremy Valeriote MLA
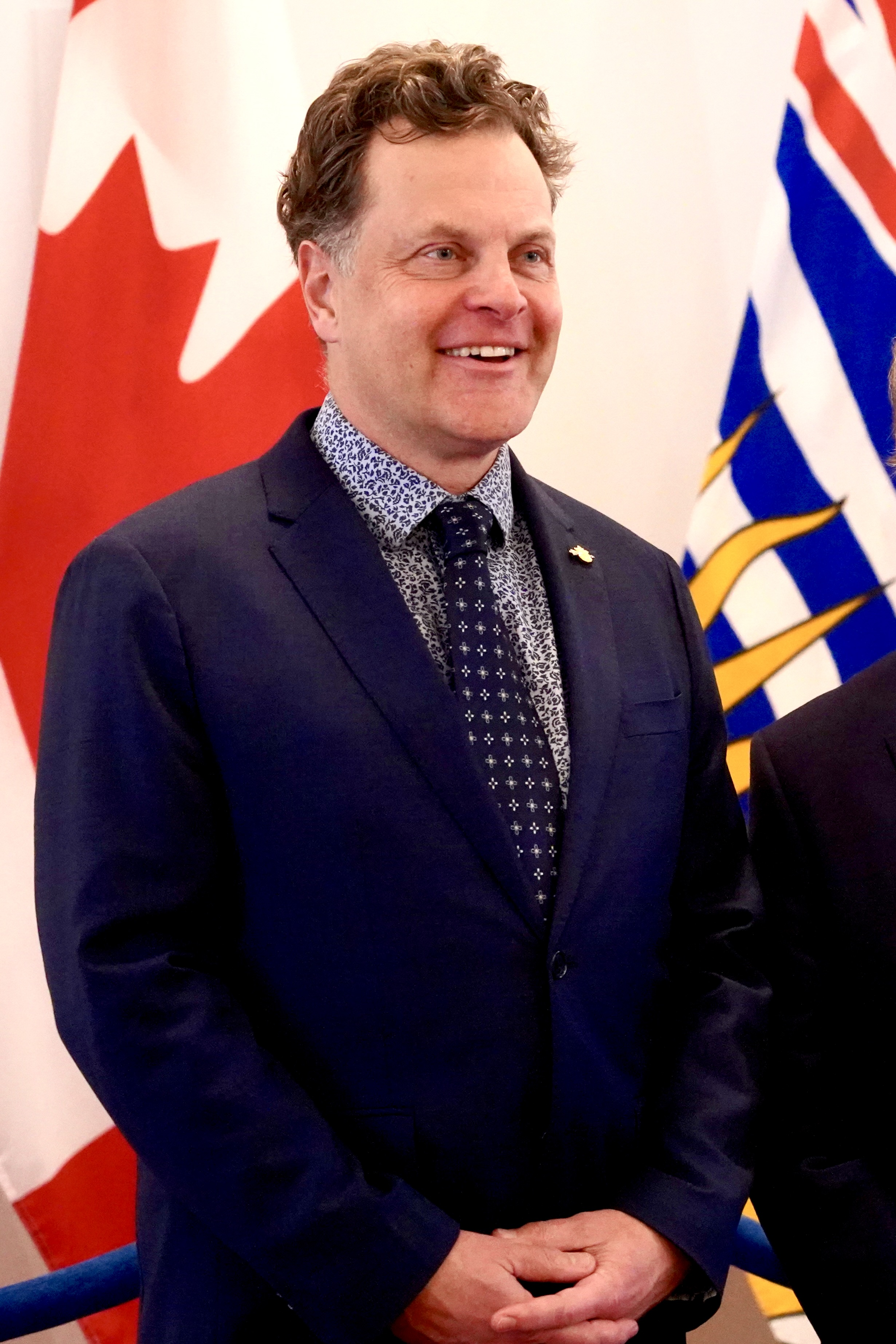
- Valeriote in 2025

Parliamentary leader of the Green Party of British Columbia
- In office September 24, 2025 – October 24, 2026
- Leader: Emily Lowan
- Preceded by: Himself (as interim leader)
- Succeeded by: Emily Lowan

Interim leader of the Green Party of British Columbia
- In office January 28, 2025 – September 24, 2025
- Preceded by: Sonia Furstenau
- Succeeded by: Emily Lowan

Member of the Legislative Assembly for West Vancouver-Sea to Sky
- Incumbent
- Assumed office October 19, 2024
- Preceded by: Jordan Sturdy

Gibsons town councillor
- In office 2014–2018

Personal details
- Party: BC Greens
- Profession: Engineer, environmental consultant

Jeremy Valeriote is a Canadian politician who has served as a member of the Legislative Assembly of British Columbia (MLA) representing the electoral district of West Vancouver-Sea to Sky since 2024. He is the first member of the Green Party of British Columbia elected on British Columbia's mainland. Following the resignation of Sonia Furstenau, Valeriote briefly served as interim leader of the Green Party of British Columbia until the 2025 leadership election, where he was succeeded by Emily Lowan.

== Biography ==
Valeriote is a geological engineer by training who worked for more than two decades as an environmental consultant in the mining, environmental management and impact assessment sectors. He has also consulted for local government and sat on the town council in Gibsons from 2014 to 2018. He worked in the mayor's office in Squamish from 2021 to 2023.

He previously ran in the same district in the 2020 British Columbia general election, and was briefly reported as the winner of the seat that year, but after the advance ballots were counted he was found to have narrowly lost to Jordan Sturdy of the British Columbia Liberal Party.

== Electoral results ==
=== Provincial elections ===
2026 British Columbia general election: West Vancouver-Sea to Sky
** Preliminary results — Not yet official **
Party	Candidate	Votes	%	±%
Green	Jeremy Valeriote	10,503	47.56	+9.49
Conservative	Ayla Dumais	8,478	38.39	+2.78
New Democratic	Michelle Livaja	2,283	10.34	−15.97
CentreBC	Dan Wood	818	3.70	–
Total valid votes		22,082	99.90	
Total rejected ballots		22	0.10	−0.05
Turnout		22,104		
Registered voters				
Source: Elections BC
Green hold		Swing		+3.35

2024 British Columbia general election: West Vancouver-Sea to Sky
Party	Candidate	Votes	%	±%	Expenditures
Green	Jeremy Valeriote	10,438	38.08	-0.1	$65,275.93
Conservative	Yuri Fulmer	9,762	35.61	–	$86,706
New Democratic	Jen Ford	7,212	26.31	+0.6	$31,452
Total valid votes		27,412	–		
Total rejected ballots					
Turnout					
Registered voters					
Green notional hold		Swing		–	
Source: Elections BC

2020 British Columbia general election: West Vancouver-Sea to Sky
Party	Candidate	Votes	%	±%	Expenditures
Liberal	Jordan Sturdy	9,249	37.54	−5.53	$51,349.99
Green	Jeremy Valeriote	9,189	37.30	+8.66	$37,603.39
New Democratic	Keith Murdoch	6,197	25.16	−1.77	$9,806.90
Total valid votes		24,635	99.45	–	
Total rejected ballots		137	0.55	+0.14	
Turnout		24,772	56.89	−4.20	
Registered voters		43,546			
Liberal hold		Swing		–7.10	
Source: Elections BC

=== 2014 Gibsons Town Council election ===
Top 4 candidates elected

Council candidate	Vote	%
Silas White	1,529	67.99
Jeremy Valeriote	1,325	58.92
Charlene SanJenko (X)	1,244	55.31
Stafford Lumley	1,117	49.67
LeeAnn Johnson (X)	925	41.13
Dan Bouman (X)	849	37.75
Barry Janyk	832	36.99
Katie Janyk	698	31.04
Turnout	2,249	62.47

== See also ==
- 43rd Parliament of British Columbia
