= Constitution Act (British Columbia) =

Part of the constitution of British Columbia, Canada

The Constitution Act, RSBC 1996, c 66 forms part of the provincial constitution of British Columbia. Enacted in 1871, the Act outlines the powers and rules governing the executive and legislative branches of the provincial government of British Columbia. British Columbia is the only province of Canada to have such an act; the constitutions of other provinces are made up of a diffuse number of sources. Despite this, even the Constitution Act is not truly exhaustive, as certain aspects of the province's constitution are not included in it.

Prior to its enactment, the powers and rules of the British Columbia executive and legislature were derived from the British Columbia Terms of Union, which officially joined British Columbia into Canada. Those terms of union, in turn, continued the government established in the terms of union between the Colony of Vancouver Island with the Colony of British Columbia. The British Columbia Terms of Union is still part of the Constitution of Canada.
