= Next Conservative Party of British Columbia leadership election =

Political party leadership election in Canada

- TBD
Incumbent leader
Lorne Doerkson (interim)

Next Conservative Party of British Columbia leadership election
- Date: TBD
- Convention: Location TBD
- Resigning leader: Kerry-Lynne Findlay

Following the resignation of Conservative Party of British Columbia leader Kerry-Lynne Findlay on September 20, 2026, the party may hold a leadership election in the coming months. The night of Findlay's resignation, Lorne Doerkson was named interim leader, and two days later, the 2026 British Columbia general election was called. The party's board of directors said that Doerkson would be made permanent leader if he became Premier of British Columbia, though the board of directors does not have the authority to make a required change to the party’s constitution to allow for this. The party won the election. Doerkson has said once he has been sworn in as premier, he will remain party leader, calling any changes necessary for him to continue leading the party "administrative" in nature. Party president Mauro Francis said he does not anticipate any opposition to amending the party constitution so that Doerkson can remain leader.

== Background ==
Kerry-Lynne Findlay resigned as party leader on September 20, 2026. She remained the candidate for the 2026 Abbotsford-Mission provincial by-election which was to occur on September 26, 2026, triggered by the resignation of Reann Gasper. The by-election was cancelled as a result of the calling of the 2026 British Columbia general election.

== Timeline ==
=== 2026 ===
- May 30 – The 2026 Conservative Party of British Columbia leadership election occurs, and Kerry-Lynne Findlay is announced as the winner.
- August 22 – Reann Gasper announces her resignation as MLA for Abbotsford-Mission.
- August 29 – A by-election is called for Abbotsford-Mission; shortly after, Findlay announces her candidacy.
- September 18 – Peter Milobar becomes leader of CentreBC.
- September 20
  - Findlay announces her resignation as leader of the Conservative Party.
  - Lorne Doerkson, MLA for Cariboo-Chilcotin, is named interim leader by the party's board of directors.
- September 22
  - The 2026 British Columbia general election is called.
  - Interim leader Lorne Doerkson announces in a press conference that he is running for the office of premier, and he will continue to serve as premier if the Conservatives win the mandate.
- September 23 – The party's board of directors releases a statement saying it will make Doerkson permanent leader if he becomes Premier of British Columbia following the general election. NDP MLA and Attorney General Niki Sharma questioned the legality of such steps by the board, saying they could be challenged in court.
- October 24 – The 2026 British Columbia general election occurs. Doerkson leads the party to a majority government, becoming premier-designate.
- October 26 – Doerkson says he will remain party leader, downplaying any impediments to his continued leadership as "administrative" matters. He also tells reporters that he may recall the legislature for a short fall session.
- November 20 – Lorne Doerkson is sworn in as Premier of British Columbia and forms a government.

== Potential candidates ==
- Lorne Doerkson, Premier of British Columbia (2026–present), incumbent interim leader (2026–present), (Note: According to the Conservative Party's constitution, an interim leader cannot run to become the leader on a permanent basis. However, the party announced that they will consider attempting to amend the party's constitution to allow him to run in the event that the Conservatives won the 2026 general election.) and MLA for Cariboo-Chilcotin (2020–present).

=== Declined ===
- Aaron Gunn, MP for North Island—Powell River (2025–present)€
- Caroline Elliott, MLA for West Vancouver-Capilano (2026–present), 2026 leadership election runner up, former BC United vice-president
