= Emily Lowan =

Canadian politician (born 2000)

Emily Lowan MLA
- Lowan in 2026

Leader of the Green Party of British Columbia
- Incumbent
- Assumed office September 24, 2025
- Preceded by: Jeremy Valeriote (interim)

Member of the British Columbia Legislative Assembly for Saanich North and the Islands
- Incumbent
- Assumed office October 24, 2026
- Preceded by: Rob Botterell

Personal details
- Born: September 18, 2000 (age 26) Saanich Peninsula, British Columbia, Canada
- Party: BC Greens
- Education: University of Victoria (BA)

Emily Lowan MLA (born September 18, 2000) is a Canadian politician and activist who has served as leader of the Green Party of British Columbia since 2025. A member of the Legislative Assembly of British Columbia (MLA), she has represented the electoral district of Saanich North and the Islands since 2026. She is the first Generation Z leader of a major political party in Canada.

== Leader of the BC Greens (2025–present) ==
On July 3, 2025, Lowan launched her campaign for the party leadership, receiving endorsements from David Suzuki, among others. She won the election in September 2025, winning over 60% of the popular vote, becoming the first Generation Z leader of a major political party in Canadian history.

Membership in the party increased from roughly 5,500 to 10,000 during the leadership campaign primarily bringing in youth, with membership under 30 increasing tenfold. Much of this growth comes from Lowan's activity on social media sites, where she uses short-form videos to express her platform and policies.

In February 2026, under Lowan's leadership the party decided not to renew its confidence and supply agreement with the BC NDP government, accusing it of not implementing the terms of the agreement.

Lowan was announced as the Green candidate for Saanich North and the Islands in the 2026 General Election following the announcement incumbent Rob Botterell would not seek a second term.

== Political positions ==
Lowan positions herself as a progressive challenging the political establishment, similar to Zack Polanski in the United Kingdom and Zohran Mamdani in the United States.

=== Oligarchy ===
A major priority of Lowan's campaign and platform as leader is raising taxes on the wealthiest people in the province. Lowan defines “the oligarchs” as people who have at least CAD$100 million in assets. According to Lowan, “There’s about 650 individuals in B.C. that fall under that particular bracket.” She is critical of the power these individuals have over government policy and has specifically targeted her rhetoric at Lululemon founder Chip Wilson and businessman Jim Pattison.

Lowan advocates for an "ultra-wealthy fairness tax" similar to the one-time five per cent tax proposed in California on wealth over $1 billion.

Shortly after being elected leader in September 2025, Lowan held the Fight the Oligarchs Tour. The two-month-long tour took her across the province visiting small communities, meeting with community leaders, Green Party members, and the general public.

=== Labour ===
Lowan has advocated for "aggressively expanding unionization" and implementing sectoral bargaining, legislation which would allow unions to reach a collective agreement that covers all workers in a sector of the economy.

Lowan has criticized the BC NDP for their handling of the 2025 BCGEU public service strike, the longest public service strike in Canadian history. Lowan has also accused David Eby of "abandoning his traditional labour and progressive base."

She has also argued that unions must be a larger part of the government's consultation process, pointing to the BC NDP's plan to allow private liquor distribution being tainted by "corporate lobbying."

=== Climate change ===
Lowan has voiced her opposition to the memorandum of understanding (MOU) signed by Mark Carney and Danielle Smith on the construction of a new pipeline to British Columbia's North Coast.

She successfully campaigned to have the University of Victoria’s working capital fund divest $256 million of investments in fossil fuel corporations. She is the former Fossil Fuel Supply Campaigns Lead at Climate Action Network Canada.

=== Indigenous rights ===
Lowan supports the implementation of the Declaration on the Rights of Indigenous Peoples Act (DRIPA), calling for the government to "build a shared vision with First Nations on a stable, clear path forward with the implementation of DRIPA."

=== Electoral reform ===
Lowan campaigns for reforming British Columbia's electoral system, supporting proportional representation. This would involve the creation of regional ridings to which representatives would be elected based on the proportion of support their party receives in their regional riding.

== Personal life ==
Emily Lowan was born and raised on the Saanich Peninsula of Vancouver Island. She is an alumna of Claremont Secondary School in Saanich, British Columbia, as well as the University of Victoria, where she holds Bachelor of Arts degrees in political science and environmental studies. Lowan worked for Climate Action Network Canada between 2023 and 2025, where she coordinated efforts among NGOs and Indigenous groups to advocate for phasing out the use of fossil fuels.

== Electoral history ==
2026 British Columbia general election: Saanich North and the Islands
Party	Candidate	Votes	%	±%
Green	Emily Lowan	15,708	48.31	+12.16
Conservative	Ryan Windsor	10,251	31.53	+1.74
New Democratic	Kala Bryson	5,759	17.71	−14.48
CentreBC	Richard Smith	755	2.32	–
Total valid votes		32,473	99.91	
Total rejected ballots		39	0.12	0.00
Turnout		32,512		
Registered voters				
Source: Elections BC
Green hold		Swing		+6.95
