= New Westminster-Coquitlam (provincial electoral district) =

Provincial electoral district in Metro Vancouver

British Columbia electoral district
- Interactive map of riding boundaries

Provincial electoral district
- Legislature: Legislative Assembly of British Columbia
MLA
Jennifer Whiteside
New Democratic
- District created: 2023
- First contested: 2024
- Last contested: 2026

Demographics
- Population (2021): 58,003
- Area (km²): 13
- Pop. density (per km²): 4,461.8
- Census division: Metro Vancouver
- Census subdivision(s): Coquitlam (part), New Westminster

New Westminster-Coquitlam is a provincial electoral district in British Columbia, Canada. It was established in 2023 in preparation for the 2024 British Columbia general election. It mostly includes areas from the former New Westminster riding, and parts of the adjusted Coquitlam-Maillardville electoral district.

== Demographics ==
Population, 2021	58,003
Area (km^{2})	13
Pop. density (people per km^{2})	4,461
Source: BC Electoral Boundaries Commission

== Geography ==
Located in New Westminster and southwestern Coquitlam, the district comprises downtown New Westminster, including Queen's Park, Sapperton and Brunette Creek. It is bordered by the Fraser River to the south and west.

== Members of the Legislative Assembly ==
This riding has elected the following members of the Legislative Assembly:

Assembly	Years	Member	Party
New Westminster-Coquitlam; Riding created from New Westminster and Coquitlam-Maillardville
43rd	2024–2026	Jennifer Whiteside	New Democratic
44th	2026–present	Jennifer Whiteside	New Democratic

== Election results ==
2026 British Columbia general election
Party	Candidate	Votes	%	±%	Expenditures
New Democratic	Jennifer Whiteside	10,309	50.38		
Conservative	Michele Lau	6,960	34.01		
Green	Maureen Curran	3,084	15.07		
Unaffiliated	Gerry Lenoski*	—	—	—	
Total valid votes		20,353	99.46		
Total rejected ballots		110	0.54		
Turnout		20,463			
Registered voters					
New Democratic hold		Swing		−6.63	
Source: Elections BC *Note: Unaffiliated candidate Gerry Lenoski withdrew from the race, but his name remained on the ballot as ballot printing had already begun at the time of his withdrawal. Election officials informed voters at voting places that Lenoski had withdrawn as a candidate.

2024 British Columbia general election
Party	Candidate	Votes	%	±%	Expenditures
New Democratic	Jennifer Whiteside	12,757	59.13	–2.0	$38,961.23
Conservative	Ndellie Massey	6,438	29.84	+26.6	$2,659.09
Green	Maureen Curran	2,380	11.03	–7.3	$2,982.41
Total valid votes/expense limit		21,575	99.74	–	$71,700.08
Total rejected ballots		56	0.26	–	
Turnout		21,631	54.05	–	
Registered voters		40,020			
New Democratic notional hold		Swing		–14.3	
Source: Elections BC

2020 provincial election redistributed results
Party	%
New Democratic	61.1
Green	18.3
Liberal	16.5
Conservative	3.2

== See also ==
- List of British Columbia provincial electoral districts
- Canadian provincial electoral districts
