= 2026 British Columbia general election =

Canadian provincial election

- October 24, 2026

All 93 seats in the Legislative Assembly of British Columbia 47 seats needed for a majority
- Opinion polls
- Registered: 3,738,182
- Turnout: 52.0% (1,944,980) (▼6.4pp)

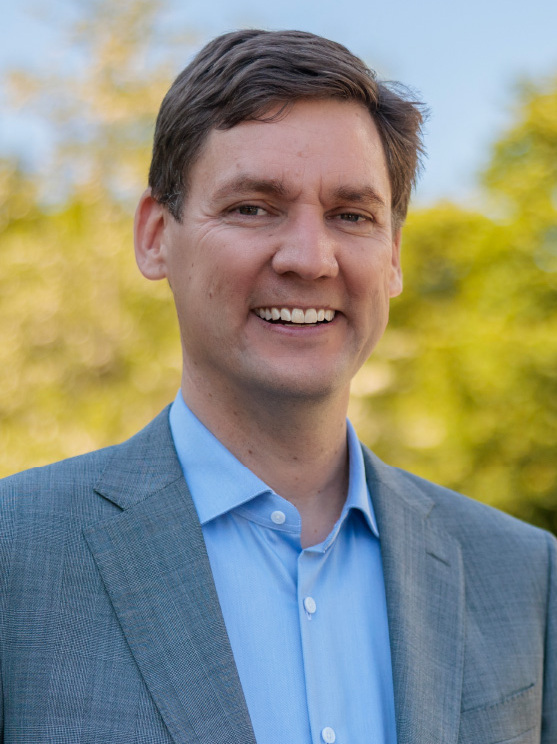

	First party	Second party	Third party
Leader	Lorne Doerkson (interim)	David Eby	Emily Lowan
Party	Conservative	New Democratic	Green
Leader since	September 20, 2026	October 21, 2022	September 24, 2025
Leader's seat	Cariboo-Chilcotin	Vancouver-Point Grey	Saanich North and the Islands (Note: Not the incumbent but stood for this seat and won)
Last election	44 seats, 43.28%	47 seats, 44.86%	2 seats, 8.24%
Seats before	36 (Note: The party had 28 seats at dissolution; however, seven MLAs from CentreBC and one independent returned the day the writs were issued.)	47	2
Seats won	64	27	2
Seat change	▲28	▼20	Steady
Popular vote	928,019	730,939	216,808
Percentage	47.71%	37.58%	11.15%
Swing	▲6.34 pp	▼7.28 pp	▲2.91 pp

- Composition of the Legislative Assembly after the election
Premier before election
David Eby
New Democratic
Premier after election
Lorne Doerkson
Conservative

The 2026 British Columbia general election was held on October 24, 2026, to elect members of the 44th Parliament of the Legislative Assembly of British Columbia. Lieutenant Governor Wendy Lisogar-Cocchia dropped the writs of election on September 22, 2026, after Premier David Eby advised her to dissolve the legislature, two years before the scheduled fixed-election date. Key issues of the election campaign included the cost of living, housing, infrastructure, U.S. tariffs, public safety, the Declaration on the Rights of Indigenous Peoples Act, government spending, education, and healthcare.

Instability had rocked the opposition Conservatives under leader John Rustad, who resigned in December 2025. Kerry-Lynne Findlay, a former federal Conservative MP, was elected as his permanent successor, but continued turmoil under her leadership led to the exodus of many Conservative MLAs. She later resigned amid a decline in polling. The election call, made just two days after, was broadly criticized by observers as opportunistic in its attempt to capitalize on this fact. Eby and the New Democratic Party (NDP), who enjoyed a slim majority in the legislature, were seen as having no clear impetus to call the election, and with the electorate angered by the writ drop and the Conservatives largely uniting behind newly-appointed interim leader Lorne Doerkson, public opinion polls taken at the start of the campaign and until election day showed a consistent lead for the Conservatives.

The election resulted in a majority government victory for the Conservatives, with the party winning 64 seats — marking the first time since the 1928 election that the party formed its own government and the first time since the 2013 election that a right-of-centre party has formed a majority government in the province. The election also marked the first time that a party led by an interim leader has won an election in Canadian history. In its worst defeat since 2001, the NDP was reduced to 27 seats, ending nine years as the province's government, with Eby resigning as party leader on election night. Emily Lowan led the Green Party to a modest gain in vote share, with Lowan herself newly elected to the Legislative Assembly. CentreBC and OneBC, led by MLAs who had left the Conservatives, lost all representation in the Legislature, with party leaders Elenore Sturko and Dallas Brodie, respectively, losing their seats by large margins.

== Date of the election ==
Section 23 of British Columbia's Constitution Act provides that general elections occur on the third Saturday in October of the fourth calendar year after the last election. The previous election was held in 2024; the next election therefore was required to occur by October 21, 2028. The same section, though, makes the fixed election date subject to the lieutenant governor's prerogative to dissolve the Legislative Assembly as they see fit (in practice, on the advice of the premier or following a vote of non-confidence).

On September 22, 2026, Premier David Eby called an election two years early, for October 24, 2026. The timing of the election was widely criticized for overlapping with the 2026 municipal elections.

== Background ==
The 2024 British Columbia general election was held on October 19, 2024. The incumbent New Democratic Party (NDP), led by premier David Eby, won a narrow majority government, marking their third consecutive term in office. The opposition BC United (formerly the BC Liberals) withdrew shortly before the election and endorsed the Conservative Party, led by John Rustad, who went on to form the official opposition. The Green Party won two seats, but leader Sonia Furstenau lost her seat. (Note: Furstenau was the incumbent MLA for Cowichan Valley but stood in Victoria-Beacon Hill in 2024.)

=== Changes among the BC Conservatives ===
On December 3, 2025, a letter was sent to the B.C. Conservative party president on behalf of 20 (of 39) of the party's MLAs calling for John Rustad to be removed as leader. The following day, Rustad announced his resignation as party leader. A caucus vote selected Trevor Halford as interim leader.

The party's leadership election in May 2026 was won by former federal Cabinet minister Kerry-Lynne Findlay. Findlay subsequently resigned the leadership of the party on September 20, 2026, after a series of MLAs left or were removed from caucus. Later that night, the party's board, following a caucus recommendation, appointed MLA Lorne Doerkson as interim leader.

Findlay was slated to run as the BC Conservative candidate in a by-election in Abbotsford-Mission on September 26 after Reann Gasper resigned to allow Findlay to run for a seat, but the election was cancelled (and early-voting ballots discarded) when Premier Eby called the 2026 general election on September 22. Eby's election call, when the opposition had no permanent leader, is without precedent in Canadian history, and political commentators and an editorial in The Globe and Mail newspaper criticized the decision for violating democratic norms. During the 43rd Legislature, two parties split from the BC Conservatives: Dallas Brodie's OneBC and Peter Milobar's unnamed breakaway party, which later effectively merged with CentreBC before Milobar and other MLAs returned to the BC Conservatives on the day the election was called.

=== BC United and CentreBC ===
In June 2026, former supporters of BC United met in an effort to reclaim the party's Liberal brand name and plan a potential comeback following the election of Kerry-Lynne Findlay as leader of the BC Conservatives. In September 2026 a grassroots group called Unite Liberal BC sought to revive BC United in order to give voters a "principled, mainstream centre-right alternative".

BC United did not nominate any candidates for the October 2026 election, but an offshoot of the party, CentreBC, nominated candidates in 35 of the 93 provincial constituencies. Kamloops Centre MLA Peter Milobar briefly led CentreBC after BC Conservative infighting during Findlay's leadership, but he and majority of the former BC Conservative MLAs returned to the party on September 22. CentreBC was founded in 2025 by former BC United MLA Karin Kirkpatrick to serve as a moderate option for B.C. voters. Former BC United MLA for Surrey-Cloverdale, Elenore Sturko, became leader of CentreBC on September 22, 2026, the day the election was called for October 24, 2026.

=== Changes in the Greens ===
Although the NDP achieved a majority in the October 2024 election, on December 13, 2024 the NDP and Greens announced a co-operation agreement that outlined a list of priorities agreed upon by the parties. On January 28, 2025, Furstenau announced her resignation as Green Party leader. Jeremy Valeriote was named interim leader until the September 2025 leadership election, which resulted in Emily Lowan becoming the youngest leader of a Canadian political party with an elected member in legislature, at 26 years of age.

== Incumbents not standing for re-election ==
MLA	Party	Seat	First elected	Date announced	Ref.
John Rustad	Conservative	Nechako Lakes	2005	December 4, 2025	
Lana Popham	New Democrat	Saanich South	2009	September 21, 2026	
Kelly Greene	New Democrat	Richmond-Steveston	2020	September 22, 2026	
Ravi Kahlon	New Democrat	Delta North	2017	September 22, 2026	
Linda Hepner	Conservative	Surrey-Serpentine River	2024	September 22, 2026	
Rob Botterell	Green	Saanich North and the Islands	2024	September 23, 2026	
Brenda Bailey	New Democrat	Vancouver-South Granville	2020	September 23, 2026	
George Chow	New Democrat	Vancouver-Fraserview	2017	September 27, 2026	
Amelia Boultbee	New Democrat (Note: Elected as a Conservative)	Penticton-Summerland	2024	September 28, 2026	
Hon Chan	Independent (Note: Elected as a Conservative)	Richmond Centre	2024	October 2, 2026	
Tara Armstrong	Independent (Note: Elected as a Conservative. Founding member of OneBC.)	Kelowna-Lake Country-Coldstream	2024	October 3, 2026	
Brent Chapman	OneBC (Note: Elected as a Conservative)	Surrey South	2024	October 3, 2026	

== Timeline ==
43rd Parliament of British Columbia – Movement in seats held up to the election (2024–2026)
Party	2024 (election)	Gain/(loss) due to							2026 (at dissolution)
Party	2024 (election)	Resignation as MLA	Died in office	Formed new party	Changed allegiance	Left caucus	Removed from caucus	Rejoined caucus	2026 (at dissolution)
New Democratic	47		(1)		1				47
Conservative	44	(1)			(2)	(12)	(6)	5	28
CentreBC	–			8					8
Green	2								2
OneBC	–			2	1	(1)	(1)	1	2
Independent	–			(10)		13	7	(6)	4
Vacant	–	1	1						2
Total	93								93

Standings in the 43rd British Columbia Parliament
Party	Leader	House members		
Party	Leader	2024 election	At dissolution	After dissolution
New Democratic	David Eby	47	47	47
Conservative	Lorne Doerksen (interim)	44	28	36
Green	Jeremy Valeriote, parliamentary (Note: Party leader Emily Lowan does not currently hold a seat.)	2	2	2
OneBC	Dallas Brodie (interim)	0	2	2
CentreBC	Elenore Sturko	0	8	1
Independent		0	4	3
Total occupied seats		93	91	91
Vacant		0	2	▲2
Total seats		93		

Party affiliation changed
Involuntary departure
█ CentreBC
█ Conservative
█ New Democratic
█ OneBC
█ Independent

43rd Parliament of British Columbia (2025–2026) – Membership and party affiliation changes
Electoral district	Before			Change	
Electoral district	Date	Reason	Member exited	New member	Date
Vancouver-Quilchena	March 7, 2025	Removed from caucus; formed new party	Dallas Brodie (Conservative → Independent → OneBC)		June 9, 2025
Vancouver-Quilchena	December 13, 2025	Removed from caucus; rejoined caucus	Dallas Brodie (Independent → OneBC)		December 21, 2025
Peace River North	March 7, 2025	Left caucus	Jordan Kealy (Conservative → Independent)		
Kelowna-Lake Country-Coldstream	March 7, 2025	Left caucus; formed new party	Tara Armstrong (Conservative → Independent → OneBC)		June 9, 2025
Kelowna-Lake Country-Coldstream	December 16, 2025	Left caucus	Tara Armstrong (OneBC → Independent)		
Surrey-Cloverdale	September 22, 2025	Removed from caucus; crossed floor to CentreBC	Elenore Sturko (Conservative → Independent → CentreBC)		September 18, 2026
Penticton-Summerland	October 20, 2025	Left caucus; crossed floor to the NDP	Amelia Boultbee (Conservative → Independent → New Democratic)		July 3, 2026
Richmond Centre	March 26, 2026	Removed from caucus	Hon Chan (Conservative → Independent)		
Kamloops Centre	August 14, 2026	Left caucus; crossed floor to CentreBC	Peter Milobar (Conservative → Independent → CentreBC) (Note: Rejoined the Conservatives after dissolution)		September 18, 2026
Abbotsford-Mission	August 22, 2026	Resigned to allow Kerry-Lynne Findlay to contest seat	Reann Gasper (Conservative)	Vacant	
Delta South	August 24, 2026	Left caucus; crossed floor to CentreBC	Ian Paton (Conservative → Independent → CentreBC)		September 18, 2026
Prince George-Valemount	August 25, 2026	Left caucus; crossed floor to CentreBC	Rosalyn Bird (Conservative → Independent → CentreBC)		September 18, 2026
Richmond-Bridgeport	August 26, 2026	Left caucus; crossed floor to CentreBC	Teresa Wat (Conservative → Independent → CentreBC)		September 18, 2026
Courtenay-Comox	August 26, 2026	Left caucus	Brennan Day (Conservative → Independent)		
Abbotsford South	August 27, 2026	Left caucus; crossed floor to CentreBC	Bruce Banman (Conservative → Independent → CentreBC)		September 18, 2026
Vancouver-Strathcona	August 28, 2026	Died in office	Joan Phillip (New Democratic)	Vacant	
Chilliwack-Cultus Lake	August 31, 2026	Left caucus; crossed floor to CentreBC	Áʼa꞉líya Warbus (Conservative → Independent → CentreBC)		September 18, 2026
Boundary-Similkameen	September 2, 2026	Left caucus; crossed floor to CentreBC	Donegal Wilson (Conservative → Independent → CentreBC)		September 18, 2026
Columbia River-Revelstoke	September 2, 2026	Left caucus; rejoined caucus	Scott McInnis (Conservative → Independent → Conservative)		September 21, 2026
Skeena	September 18, 2026	Removed from caucus; rejoined caucus	Claire Rattée (Conservative → Independent → Conservative)		September 21, 2026
Surrey-White Rock	September 18, 2026	Removed from caucus; rejoined caucus	Trevor Halford (Conservative → Independent → Conservative)		September 21, 2026
Nechako Lakes	September 18, 2026	Removed from caucus; rejoined caucus	John Rustad (Conservative → Independent → Conservative)		September 21, 2026
Surrey-Serpentine River	September 20, 2026	Left caucus; rejoined caucus	Linda Hepner (Conservative → Independent → Conservative)		September 21, 2026
Surrey South	September 22, 2026	Left caucus; crossed the floor to OneBC	Brent Chapman (Conservative → OneBC)		September 22, 2026

Number of members per party by date	2024	2025							2026														
Number of members per party by date	Oct 19	Mar 7	Jun 9	Sep 22	Oct 20	Dec 13	Dec 16	Dec 21	Mar 26	Jul 3	Aug 14	Aug 22	Aug 24	Aug 25	Aug 26	Aug 27	Aug 28	Aug 31	Sep 2	Sep 18	Sep 20	Sep 21	Sep 22
New Democratic	47									48							47						
Conservative	44	41		40	39				38		37	36	35	34	32	31		30	28	25	24	29	28
Green	2																						
CentreBC	0																			8			
OneBC	0		2			1	0	1															2
Independent	0	3	1	2	3	4	5	4	5	4	5		6	7	9	10		11	13	8	9	4	
Vacant	0											1					2						

=== 2024 ===
- December 12 – The BC NDP and BC Greens announce the "Co-operation and Responsible Government Accord".

=== 2025 ===
- January 28 – Green Party leader Sonia Furstenau announces her intention to resign. West Vancouver-Sea to Sky MLA Jeremy Valeriote is appointed as interim leader.
- March 7 – Dallas Brodie is removed from the Conservative caucus for comments about residential schools. Following this, Jordan Kealy and Tara Armstrong leave the Conservative caucus.
- June 9 – Brodie and Armstrong launch a new party called OneBC, with Brodie serving as interim leader and Armstrong the house leader.
- September 22 – Conservative leader John Rustad passes his leadership review with 70.66% support. Elenore Sturko is subsequently removed from the Conservative caucus.
- September 24 – Emily Lowan wins the 2025 Green Party of British Columbia leadership election.
- October 20 – Amelia Boultbee leaves the Conservative caucus to sit as an independent.
- November 15 – David Eby survives his leadership review with 82% support.
- December 3 – Rustad is removed as Conservative leader by the party's board of directors and caucus. He is replaced by Surrey-White Rock MLA Trevor Halford as interim leader. Rustad disputes the legitimacy of his removal.
- December 4 – Rustad announces his resignation as leader.
- December 13 – Brodie is removed as interim leader of OneBC.
- December 16 – Armstrong leaves OneBC to become an independent. The party loses representation in the legislature.
- December 21 – Brodie reassumes the leadership of OneBC after its board resigns following negotiations. The party regains representation in the legislature but with fewer than two members, it does not have official party status.

=== 2026 ===
- February 9 – The BC Greens decide not to renew their "Co-operation and Responsible Government Accord" with the BC NDP.
- March 26 – Hon Chan is removed from the Conservative caucus and sits as an independent.
- May 30 – Kerry-Lynne Findlay wins the 2026 Conservative Party of British Columbia leadership election.
- July 3 – Boultbee joins the New Democratic Party caucus.
- August 14 – Peter Milobar leaves the Conservative caucus to sit as an independent.
- August 22 – Reann Gasper steps down as MLA, allowing party leader Findlay to run for her seat in a September by-election.
- August 24 – Ian Paton leaves the Conservative caucus to sit as an independent.
- August 25 – Rosalyn Bird leaves the Conservative caucus to sit as an independent.
- August 26 – Teresa Wat and Brennan Day leave the Conservative caucus to sit as independents.
- August 27 – Bruce Banman leaves the Conservative caucus to sit as an independent.
- August 28 – Joan Philip dies.
- August 31 – Áʼa:líya Warbus leaves the Conservative caucus to sit as an independent.
- September 2 – Donegal Wilson and Scott McInnis leave the Conservative caucus to sit as independents.
- September 18 – Trevor Halford, Claire Rattée and John Rustad are removed from the Conservative caucus for calling on Findlay to resign. Eight MLAs join CentreBC, with Peter Milobar becoming leader.
- September 20 – Linda Hepner leaves the Conservative caucus to sit as an independent. Later that day, Kerry-Lynne Findlay resigns as Conservative leader. Lorne Doerkson becomes the interim leader of the Conservative Party.
- September 21 – John Rustad, Scott McInnis, Trevor Halford, Claire Rattée, and Linda Hepner return to the Conservative caucus.
- September 22 – Prior to the election call, Brent Chapman crosses the floor from the Conservatives to OneBC; Eby announces a snap election to be held on October 24, 2026. After the election call, independent Brennan Day and all CentreBC MLAs except for Elenore Sturko rejoin the Conservatives.
- October 3 – Candidate nominations closed.
- October 17 – 2026 British Columbia municipal elections.
- October 16–21 – Advanced voting is scheduled.
- October 24 – Election Day.
- November 6–10 – The final count is conducted by Elections BC.
- November 18 – The final results are returned.

== Campaign ==
=== Party slogans ===
Party	Slogan
█ New Democratic	"Build BC Strong"
█ Conservative	"Strong Leadership for Serious Times"
█ Green	"Believe in Better"
█ OneBC	"Excellence in British Columbia"
█ CentreBC	"Balanced Government for British Columbia"

=== Party platforms ===
2026 British Columbia election – issues and respective party platforms
Issue	█ New Democratic	█ Conservative	█ Green	█ OneBC	█ CentreBC
Taxation and public finance	Raise income tax by 2% for incomes above $190,405 but less than $1 million.; Introduce a new tax bracket of 24.5% for incomes above $1 million.; Suspend the provincial gas tax by 10 cents per litre.; Introduce a new tax credit for companies hiring young adults for their first full-time job.; Increase the speculation and vacancy tax by 1%.; Create a 2% tax on condos unsold for more than a year.	More than double the Basic Personal Amount to $32,000.; Suspend the PST on Canadian alcohol, business equipment and software.; Introduce a new tax credit for companies hiring young adults for their first full-time job.; Reverse changes to property tax deferment program.; Create a panel to recommend simplifying taxes.	Introduce a one-time 5-20% tax on wealth more than $50 million.; Establish a 2-5% annual tax on wealth more than $50 million.; Give local governments the power to tax unused farmland.	Cut personal and corporate income tax by 25%.; Reduce the PST from 7% to 2%.	Balance the budget by 2034-35.; Reduce the lowest income tax bracket from 5.6% to 5.06%.; Boost the tax credit for renters from $400 to $600.; Introduce a $400-a-month caregiver benefit.
Economy, jobs, and cost of living	Stop surveillance pricing.; Provide interest-free loans up to $1 million for businesses hit by U.S. tariffs.; Cap retail margins on essential groceries.; Provide $60 million to the B.C. Manufacturing Jobs Fund.; Launch a $120 million forestry jobs protection fund.; Invest in an independent, regional wholesale food terminal in the Lower Mainland.	Create a "red tape reduction" ministry.	Develop a poverty elimination plan.; Raise government assistance rates.	Speed up permit approval times.	Cap B.C. Hydro rate increases at inflation.; Provide $60 million to the B.C. Manufacturing Jobs Fund.
Public safety	Double the repeat-offending program.; Expand the Civil Forfeiture Office to target gang properties.; Hire 50 Crown prosecutors.; Create an extortion, racketeering, and gang violence unit.; Combat antisemitism by spending $50,000 to strengthen security at Jewish schools and synagogues.	Train 250 municipal cops.; Add 500 RCMP officers and 150 civilian staff.; Hire 50 Crown prosecutors.; Send police to hard-hit neighbourhoods.; Implement an anti-extortion action plan.; Expand electronic monitoring for parolees.; Increase penalties for fraudsters and abusers of seniors.	Decriminalize possession of drugs for personal use.	Prioritize prosecuting violent and repeat offenders.; Prevent downgrading of charges against violent offenders.; Protect ports from international smuggling.	Deploy 500 more police officers and 60 new Crown prosecutors.; Charge public drug users and repeat offenders within 100 days.; Launch an independent review of bail policy.; Launch safe downtown teams in 20 cities by 2028.
Healthcare	Ban user fees for publicly insured, medically necessary services.; Build 7 long-term care projects.; Consistently fund 2 Downtown Eastside centres.; Deliver 860 addiction treatment beds, 2,000 involuntary care beds, and 35 Foundry mental health resource centres.; Triple recruitment of American doctors and nurses.; Add 500 healthcare workers for seniors at home.; Provide free shingles vaccine to people aged 50 and above.; Invest in 8 MRI machines and 10 CT scanners.; Streamline the waitlist system.; Build an in-patient unit at Kelowna General Hospital.; Establish a menopause clinic; Establish a perinatal unit.	Prevent cuts to healthcare.; Stop ER and maternity closures.; Increase access to Naloxone, psychiatric services and residential treatment.; Expand publicly-funded home care and HandyDART.; Provide free shingles vaccine.; Help low-income seniors afford hearing aids.; Create a $50 million fund for rural medical practices.; Hire and train more doctors and nurses.; Tap experts to report on wait times and find solutions.; Complete Surrey Hospital and B.C. Cancer Centre.; Build a new women and children's hospital in Surrey.	Establish a community health centre in all ridings.; Expand publicly-funded long-term care facilities in rural areas.; Expand access to supervised consumption sites.; Offer mental health crisis as a fourth option for 911 calls.; Provide pharmaceutical alternatives to toxic drugs.; Increase funding for voluntary treatment and resources for youth aging out of foster care.; Improve access to respite care, day programs, and at-home care services.; Expand early screening for dementia.	Allow private sector, pay-for-service options to co-exist alongside public system.; Shift spending from administration and human resources to front line services.; Convert drug consumption sites to recovery sites.; Reopen Riverview Hospital for an involuntary drug detox program.	Establish 12 crisis centres.; Provide a family doctor or nurse practitioner for every person by 2032.; Provide counselling for 100,000 people a year.; Double assessments of internationally trained doctors.; License out-of-province doctors within 30 days.; Phase out private agency nurses.; Ensure mental treatment within 14 days.; Deliver same-day botox for urgent cases by 2028.; Expand detox and treatment by 600 beds by 2030.; Expand long-term care by 1,000 beds by 2031.; Expand Coquitlam's Red Fish Healing Centre by 130 beds.; Open 1,000 supportive homes.; Create 1.5 million more home support hours per year.; Half home-support fees for low-income seniors.
Transportation	Freeze ICBC insurance rates for 3 years.; Boost B.C. Transit funding by $40 million.; Extend the SkyTrain along King George Boulevard to Newton.; Launch a locals-first ferry reservation pilot.	Implement a hybrid auto-insurance system.; Replace the George Massey Tunnel with a 10-lane bridge.; Extend the SkyTrain along King George Boulevard to Newton.	Offer free transit to those below 25 and over 65 years of age.; Double the number of buses.; Implement regional buses on the Sea to Sky Highway.	Phase out the ICBC insurance monopoly.; End no-fault insurance.	Hold ICBC insurance rates at or below inflation until 2030.; Increase TransLink and B.C. Transit services by 15%.; Launch a 15% commuter credit for transit passes.; Rebuild intercity bus service in rural areas.; Deliver EV chargers every 80 kilometres on main highways by 2030.
Housing			Restart the Community Housing Fund and Indigenous Housing Fund.; Build 26,000 rental units a year.; Tie rent control to units rather than tenants.; End pet bans in rentals.; Protect seniors from rent increases at assisted living facilities.	Eliminate the B.C. Energy Step Code.; Block municipalities from enforcing rent control.	Offer a $240 million growth fund for cities.; Cut development costs in half for below-market projects.; Set 6-month and 8-week deadlines for rezoning and permitting, respectively.; Double the B.C. Builds program to build 20,000 below-market homes by 2031.
Education		Introduce an anti-bullying program.; Repeal the SOGI program.	Expand $10-a-day childcare.; Achieve universal free daycare by 2031.; Divert private school funding to public schools.; Hire more counsellors.; Create a school food program.; Expand SOGI to support 2SLGBTQIA+ students.; Combat misinformation.	Create a parental bill of rights.; Reinstate standardized testing and letter grades.; Scrap SOGI-123.; Remove sexually-inappropriate content from classrooms.	Expand $10-a-day childcare.; Expand capacity to support 25,000 more students by 2031.; Hire 1,500 education assistants by 2031.; Implement math screening from kindergarten to Grade 3 by 2028.; Hire 250 literacy and numeracy coaches.; Restore level grades for Grade 4 and up by 2028.
Energy and infrastructure	Double critical minerals production.; Expand the Port of Prince Rupert.; Fast-track the North Coast Transmission Line.; Boost smelting and refining capacity.; Set requirements for public infrastructure projects to use more B.C.-made materials.	Double LNG production by 2032.; Triple LNG production by 2035.; Stabilize oil and gas royalties.	End policies that encourage fossil-fuel expansion.; Reform oil and gas royalty framework to collect 50% of net profits.	Partner with Alberta and the federal government to encourage private-sector investments.; Approve a pipeline to Prince Rupert or Kitimat.	Keep industrial carbon pricing.; Add at least 2,000 megawatts to the power grid.; Make permit decisions on 10 mines by 2030.
Indigenous relations		Repeal the Declaration on the Rights of Indigenous Peoples Act (DRIPA).	Implement DRIPA through legislation.; Guarantee Indigenous language rights.; Fund Indigenous language preservation and revitalization.; Create a task force to investigate missing and murdered Indigenous women and children.; Improve the modern treaties process.	Repeal DRIPA.; Halt voluntary transfers of cash, land, and resources to Indigenous governments.; Restore English names of public landmarks.; End land acknowledgements in public institutions.	Replace DRIPA.; Fund $30 million for treaty negotiations and the settling overlapping claims.; Put a homeowner guarantee into law.
Environment, forestry, agriculture, and climate change	Match Canadian Red Cross donations up to $20 million for wildfires.; Pledge $50 million to permanently protect rare old-growth forests.	Buy firefighting aircraft.; Ease approvals required for controlled burns.; Remove red tape slowing response to wildfire emergencies.; Invest in early wildfire detection and prevention technologies.	Fund a new climate action plan.; Fund assessment and preparation for natural disasters.; End logging in old growth and large second-growth forests.; Increase funding for parks and trails by 50%.; Create a $30 million fund to improve trails and campsites.; Restrict foreign and corporate farmland ownership.; Fund an Agricultural Public Land Bank.	Increase the allowable yearly cut.; Reduce stumpage fees for lumber companies.	Double funding for FireSmart program.; Allot $25 million a year for thinning trees and prescribed burns.; Pledge an annual harvest of 40 million cubic metres by 2030.; Fund local wood production.

== Debates ==
Leaders' debates of the 2026 British Columbia general election
No.	Date	Place	Organizer(s)	Topic	Moderator	Language	Participants					References
P Participant N Non-invitee							David Eby	Lorne Doerkson	Emily Lowan	Dallas Brodie	Elenore Sturko	References
1	October 14, 2026	Vancouver	CBC, CTV, Citytv, Global BC, CHEK	Various	Shachi Kurl	English	P	P	P	N (Note: Not invited due to running an insufficient number of candidates, but was given the opportunity to present a pre-recorded statement)	N (Note: Not invited due to running an insufficient number of candidates, but was given the opportunity to present a pre-recorded statement)	

== Candidates ==
=== Contests ===
Only the Conservatives fielded candidates in all 93 districts. The NDP contested 92, as they failed to nominate a candidate in Peace River North because of incomplete paperwork. The Conservatives removed candidates in Victoria-Beacon Hill and Vancouver-Strathcona over social media posts, but they remained on the ballot as their removals occurred after the nomination deadline. Four candidates were endorsed by OneBC but listed as unaffiliated due to "paperwork technicalities".

As BC United failed to field at least two candidates for the second election in succession (having not fielded any in the 2024 election), the party faces automatic de-registration under Section 168 of the Election Act. This also applies to the former BC Liberal name, as its use was barred in 2024. As of polling day, October 24, the party had been removed from the list of registered parties by Elections BC.

Candidate contests (2026)
Candidates nominated	Electoral districts	Party							
Candidates nominated	Electoral districts	Con	NDP	Green	CentreBC	OneBC	Ind	Other	Total
2	4	4	3	–	–	–	1	–	8
3	33	33*	33	22	4	4	2†	1	99
4	38	38*	38	36	17	16	3†	4	152
5	14	14	14	11	10	11	4†	6	70
6	4	4	4	4	4	2	3	3	24
Totals	93	93	92	73	35	33	13	14	353

* - includes candidates subsequently disavowed by Conservatives

† - includes races where OneBC failed to identify their candidates

Candidates for the 2026 British Columbia general election 93 seats in the Legislative Assembly of British Columbia
Party	Leader	Candidates
Conservative	Lorne Doerkson (interim)	93
New Democratic	David Eby	92
Green	Emily Lowan	73
CentreBC	Elenore Sturko	35
OneBC	Dallas Brodie (interim)	33
Independent/Unaffiliated	—N/a	13
Libertarian	Alex Joehl	4
Communist	Robert Crooks	4
Christian Heritage	Christian McCay	3
CanWest	Wei Ping Chen	2
Freedom	Amrit Birring	1

== Endorsements ==
Endorsements received by each party
Type	New Democrat	Conservative	Green
Media			The Ubyssey
Public figures	Grand Chief Stewart Phillip, Union of BC Indian Chiefs (endorsed David Eby for premier)	Doug McCallum, Mayor-elect of Surrey; Aaron Gunn, MP for North Island-Powell River	Grand Chief Stewart Phillip, Union of BC Indian Chiefs (endorsed Emily Lowan in her riding); Pete Fry, Mayor-elect of Vancouver.
Unions and business associations	Kelowna Professional Fire Fighters Association (Kelowna Centre)	Kelowna Professional Fire Fighters Association (Kelowna Mission and Kelowna-Lake Country-Coldstream)	

== Results ==
The New Democratic Party (NDP) largely lost vote shares across Vancouver Island and Greater Vancouver, in what was the party's worst result since 2001, both in terms of vote percentage and vote totals, though still considerably higher in terms of seat percentage compared to 2001. These two regions saw large shifts to the Conservative Party (CPBC), which held narrow victories by popular vote across the two regions. These vote shifts resulted in the NDP going from 47 seats from the last election to 27 seats. The CPBC held their rural seats, albeit with slightly lesser leads than the 2024 election. The CPBC gained 64 seats. The Green Party retained their two seats in Saanich North and the Islands and West Vancouver-Sea to Sky. CentreBC and OneBC placed fourth (1.6%) and fifth (1.5%) place in the popular vote respectively, and these two parties did not win any seats in the election.

Observers attributed the CPBC victory to voter disenchantment towards the NDP for calling a snap election (a week after the provincial municipal elections) without clearly articulating the necessity of the election call, and a mostly united Conservative front following the departure of Findlay as leader.

Summary of the initial results of the 2026 British Columbia general election
Party	Party leader	Candidates	Seats					Popular vote				
Party	Party leader	Candidates	2024	Dissol.	2026	Change from Dissol	% seats	Votes	Vote change	%	pp change	% where running
Conservative	Lorne Doerkson (interim)	93 (Note: Includes the results for candidates in Victoria-Beacon Hill and Vancouver-Strathcona, who were removed as candidates after the nomination deadline. They received a combined 5,724 votes.)	44	28 (Note: The party had 28 seats at dissolution; however, seven MLAs from CentreBC and one independent returned the day the writs were issued, for a total of 36 incumbents.)	64	▲36	68.82%	862,317	▼48,825	48.06%	▲4.78pp	48.06%
New Democratic	David Eby	92	47	47	27	▼20	29.03%	670,811	▼273,652	37.37%	▼7.49pp	37.59%
Green	Emily Lowan	73	2	2	2	Steady	2.15%	196,896	▲22,503	10.97	▲2.73pp	13.32%
CentreBC	Elenore Sturko	35	New	8 (Note: The party had eight seats at dissolution; however, seven MLAs returned to the BC Conservatives the day the writs were issued, so they had only one incumbent.)	0	▼8	–	29,104	New	1.62%	New	4.24%
OneBC	Dallas Brodie (interim)	33 (Note: Four candidates were endorsed by OneBC but listed as unaffiliated due to "paperwork technicalities". They received a combined 1,400 votes.)	New	2	0	▼2	–	27,056	New	1.51%	New	4.13%
Independent and No Affiliation		13 (Note: Includes four candidates were endorsed by OneBC but listed as unaffiliated due to "paperwork technicalities". They received a combined 1,400 votes.)	–	4 (Note: Independent Brennan Day returned to the Conservatives the day the writ was issued, for a total of 3 incumbents)	0	▼4	–	5,881	▼66,972	0.33%	▼3.12pp	2.81%
Libertarian	Alex Joehl	4	–	–	–	Steady	–	1,105	▼275	0.06%	▼0.01	1.33%
Communist	Robert Crooks	4	–	–	–	Steady	–	559	▼80	0.03%	Steady	0.64%
Christian Heritage	Grant S. Abraham	3	–	–	–	–	–	459	▲94	0.03%	▲0.01	0.91%
CanWest	Wei Ping Chen	2	–	–	–	Steady	–	447	New	0.02%	New	1.36%
Freedom	Amrit Birring	1	–	–	–	Steady	–	127	▼1,140	0.01%	▼0.03	0.76%
Vacant				2	—N/a							
Total valid votes								1,794,762	▼310,570	99.75%	–	–
Total rejected ballots								4,417	▲1,911	0.25%	▲ pp	–
Total		353	93	93	93	Steady	100.00%	1,799,550	▼310,108	100.00%	–	100.00%
Electorate (eligible voters)/turnout								3,738,182	▲128,894	48.14%	▼10.31pp	–
Note: Judicial recounts not yet complete
Source(s): Elections BC

=== Synopsis of results ===
Results by electoral district - 2026 BC general election
Electoral district	Winning party								Votes (Note: All parties with more than 1% of the vote, or which obtained at least 1,000 votes in one riding, are shown individually. Independent candidates and other minor parties are aggregated separately. Parties are presented in the order of total votes received.)							
Electoral district	2024	1st place	Votes	Share	Margin #	Margin %	2nd place	3rd place	Con	NDP	Green	CentBC	OneBC	Ind	Other	Total
Abbotsford South	Con	Con	11,717	63.29%	6,129	33.11%	NDP	1BC	11,717	5,588	–	–	1,207	–	–	18,512
Abbotsford West	Con	Con	10,552	61.14%	5,524	32.00%	NDP	CentBC	10,552	5,028	–	1,680	–	–	–	17,260
Abbotsford-Mission	Con	Con	12,583	56.64%	4,618	20.79%	NDP	CentBC	12,583	7,965	–	780	569	–	319	22,216
Boundary-Similkameen	Con	Con	11,855	52.47%	2,650	11.73%	NDP	1BC	11,855	9,205	–	–	1,534	–	–	22,594
Bulkley Valley-Stikine	Con	Con	4,486	50.40%	363	4.08%	NDP	CHP	4,486	4,123	–	–	–	–	292	8,901
Burnaby Centre	NDP	Con	7,465	47.25%	820	5.19%	NDP	Green	7,465	6,645	1,288	402	–	–	–	15,800
Burnaby East	NDP	NDP	8,382	44.47%	286	1.52%	Con	Green	8,096	8,382	1,818	–	554	–	–	18,850
Burnaby North	NDP	Con	9,077	46.28%	812	4.14%	NDP	Green	9,077	8,265	1,824	–	447	–	–	19,613
Burnaby South-Metrotown	NDP	Con	6,570	44.50%	64	0.43%	NDP	Green	6,570	6,506	1,268	–	419	–	–	14,763
Burnaby-New Westminster	NDP	NDP	8,417	55.63%	1,705	11.27%	Con	None	6,712	8,417	–	–	–	–	–	15,129
Cariboo-Chilcotin	Con	Con	14,988	76.76%	11,623	59.53%	NDP	Green	14,988	3,365	1,173	–	–	–	–	19,526
Chilliwack North	Con	Con	11,149	59.08%	4,850	25.70%	NDP	CentBC	11,149	6,299	–	1,422	–	–	–	18,870
Chilliwack-Cultus Lake	Con	Con	13,399	59.74%	4,371	19.49%	NDP	None	13,399	9,028	–	–	–	–	–	22,427
Columbia River-Revelstoke	Con	Con	9,390	52.85%	3,041	17.12%	NDP	Green	9,390	6,349	2,029	–	–	–	–	17,768
Coquitlam-Burke Mountain	NDP	Con	10,771	52.55%	2,720	13.27%	NDP	Green	10,771	8,051	1,226	450	–	–	–	20,498
Coquitlam-Maillardville	NDP	Con	10,353	49.30%	1,577	7.51%	NDP	Green	10,353	8,776	1,873	–	–	–	–	21,002
Courtenay-Comox	Con	NDP	14,532	45.33%	930	2.90%	Con	Green	13,602	14,532	3,134	792	–	–	–	32,060
Cowichan Valley	NDP	Con	11,714	42.67%	88	0.32%	NDP	Green	11,714	11,626	4,001	–	–	–	109	27,450
Delta North	NDP	Con	10,319	53.54%	2,489	12.92%	NDP	CentBC	10,319	7,830	–	1,123	–	–	–	19,272
Delta South	Con	Con	15,338	59.77%	7,981	31.10%	NDP	Green	15,338	7,357	2,127	–	838	–	–	25,660
Esquimalt-Colwood	NDP	NDP	12,220	43.16%	3,978	14.05%	Con	Green	8,242	12,220	6,489	1,365	–	–	–	28,316
Fraser-Nicola	Con	Con	10,095	58.25%	5,130	29.60%	NDP	Green	10,095	4,965	2,270	–	–	–	–	17,330
Juan de Fuca-Malahat	NDP	Con	9,838	41.52%	763	3.22%	NDP	Green	9,838	9,075	4,133	–	584	–	63	23,693
Kamloops Centre	Con	Con	12,414	53.01%	5,194	22.18%	NDP	Green	12,414	7,220	2,658	–	865	263	–	23,420
Kamloops-North Thompson	Con	Con	18,237	64.66%	10,037	35.59%	NDP	1BC	18,237	8,200	–	–	1,767	–	–	28,204
Kelowna Centre	Con	Con	11,689	48.16%	43	0.18%	NDP	1BC	11,689	11,646	–	–	937	–	–	24,272
Kelowna-Lake Country-Coldstream	Con	Con	11,488	47.81%	3,635	15.13%	NDP	1BC	11,488	7,853	1,983	–	2,705	–	–	24,029
Kelowna-Mission	Con	Con	14,572	58.43%	7,579	30.39%	NDP	Green	14,572	6,993	2,550	–	825	–	–	24,940
Kootenay Central	NDP	NDP	8,196	39.81%	665	3.23%	Con	Green	7,531	8,196	4,089	–	772	–	–	20,588
Kootenay-Monashee	NDP	NDP	8,862	47.80%	1,933	10.43%	Con	Green	6,929	8,862	1,928	–	820	–	–	18,539
Kootenay-Rockies	Con	Con	9,389	56.09%	4,803	28.69%	NDP	Green	9,389	4,586	1,205	671	888	–	–	16,739
Ladysmith-Oceanside	NDP	NDP	14,354	44.48%	50	0.15%	Con	Green	14,304	14,354	3,616	–	–	–	–	32,274
Langford-Highlands	NDP	NDP	9,522	44.71%	1,262	5.93%	Con	Green	8,260	9,522	2,810	476	–	105	123	21,296
Langley-Abbotsford	Con	Con	14,455	61.62%	8,841	37.69%	NDP	Green	14,455	5,614	1,994	–	1,072	–	322	23,457
Langley-Walnut Grove	Con	Con	13,330	56.77%	5,883	25.06%	NDP	Green	13,330	7,447	1,696	1,006	–	–	–	23,479
Langley-Willowbrook	Con	Con	10,720	52.41%	3,320	16.23%	NDP	Green	10,720	7,400	1,580	–	755	–	–	20,455
Maple Ridge East	Con	Con	12,926	53.44%	3,844	15.89%	NDP	Green	12,926	9,082	1,832	–	–	347	–	24,187
Maple Ridge-Pitt Meadows	NDP	Con	11,780	48.33%	907	3.72%	NDP	CentBC	11,780	10,873	–	892	829	–	–	24,374
Mid Island-Pacific Rim	NDP	NDP	12,687	47.00%	1,804	6.68%	Con	Green	10,883	12,687	3,424	–	–	–	–	26,994
Nanaimo-Gabriola Island	NDP	NDP	12,168	48.28%	3,198	12.69%	Con	Green	8,970	12,168	4,063	–	–	–	–	25,201
Nanaimo-Lantzville	NDP	NDP	12,556	46.79%	1,025	3.82%	Con	Green	11,531	12,556	2,661	–	–	–	85	26,833
Nechako Lakes	Con	Con	6,322	63.21%	3,957	39.57%	NDP	Ind	6,322	2,365	–	–	–	1,314	–	10,001
New Westminster-Coquitlam	NDP	NDP	10,309	50.65%	3,349	16.45%	Con	Green	6,960	10,309	3,084	–	–	–	–	20,353
North Coast-Haida Gwaii	NDP	NDP	4,305	61.83%	2,324	33.38%	Con	Green	1,981	4,305	677	–	–	–	–	6,963
North Island	Con	Con	12,812	47.65%	1,235	4.59%	NDP	Green	12,812	11,577	2,132	–	–	369	–	26,890
North Vancouver-Lonsdale	NDP	NDP	11,306	46.98%	1,301	5.41%	Con	Green	10,005	11,306	2,756	–	–	–	–	24,067
North Vancouver-Seymour	NDP	Con	13,298	46.73%	2,648	9.31%	NDP	Green	13,298	10,650	3,105	1,402	–	–	–	28,455
Oak Bay-Gordon Head	NDP	NDP	10,176	36.92%	1,803	6.54%	Con	Green	8,373	10,176	6,164	2,846	–	–	–	27,559
Peace River North	Con	Con	9,371	85.71%	7,808	71.41%	Ind	None	9,371	–	–	–	–	1,563	–	10,934
Peace River South	Con	Con	6,243	77.68%	5,010	62.34%	NDP	Ind	6,243	1,233	–	–	–	561	–	8,037
Penticton-Summerland	Con	Con	12,163	45.32%	1,051	3.92%	NDP	Green	12,163	11,112	2,155	–	1,411	–	–	26,841
Port Coquitlam	NDP	NDP	10,626	45.30%	425	1.81%	Con	Green	10,201	10,626	2,034	–	–	301	297	23,459
Port Moody-Burquitlam	NDP	Con	11,929	46.77%	1,169	4.58%	NDP	Green	11,929	10,760	2,103	715	–	–	–	25,507
Powell River-Sunshine Coast	NDP	NDP	13,314	48.88%	2,642	9.70%	Con	Green	10,672	13,314	3,251	–	–	–	–	27,237
Prince George-Mackenzie	Con	Con	10,473	66.03%	6,703	42.26%	NDP	Green	10,473	3,770	1,618	–	–	–	–	15,861
Prince George-North Cariboo	Con	Con	12,437	69.92%	8,800	49.47%	NDP	Green	12,437	3,637	1,714	–	–	–	–	17,788
Prince George-Valemount	Con	Con	6,965	50.45%	2,854	20.67%	NDP	Green	6,965	4,111	1,655	–	1,076	–	–	13,807
Richmond Centre	Con	Con	7,937	57.18%	3,175	22.87%	NDP	Green	7,937	4,762	836	–	–	–	346	13,881
Richmond-Bridgeport	Con	Con	10,145	67.93%	5,356	35.86%	NDP	None	10,145	4,789	–	–	–	–	–	14,934
Richmond-Queensborough	Con	Con	10,101	58.95%	4,378	25.55%	NDP	Green	10,101	5,723	1,311	–	–	–	–	17,135
Richmond-Steveston	NDP	Con	11,665	54.22%	4,122	19.16%	NDP	CentBC	11,665	7,543	–	1,696	–	470	142	21,516
Saanich North and the Islands	Green	Green	15,708	48.37%	5,457	16.80%	Con	NDP	10,251	5,759	15,708	755	–	–	–	32,473
Saanich South	NDP	Con	11,393	39.05%	1,233	4.23%	NDP	Green	11,393	10,160	7,624	–	–	–	–	29,177
Salmon Arm-Shuswap	Con	Con	16,144	54.61%	7,772	26.29%	NDP	Green	16,144	8,372	2,461	1,086	1,502	–	–	29,565
Skeena	Con	Con	5,851	51.17%	1,523	13.32%	NDP	Green	5,851	4,328	969	–	287	–	–	11,435
Surrey City Centre	NDP	Con	6,396	47.29%	384	2.84%	NDP	1BC	6,396	6,012	–	481	636	–	–	13,525
Surrey North	Con	Con	8,024	57.62%	3,413	24.51%	NDP	Green	8,024	4,611	627	343	260	61	–	13,926
Surrey South	Con	Con	13,479	61.40%	8,578	39.07%	NDP	CentBC	13,479	4,901	1,122	2,178 (Note: Elenore Sturko was previously Conservative MLA for Surrey-Cloverdale)	–	274	–	21,954
Surrey-Cloverdale	Con	Con	9,915	53.07%	3,564	19.08%	NDP	Green	9,915	6,351	1,318	629	471	–	–	18,684
Surrey-Fleetwood	NDP	Con	9,471	50.86%	2,385	12.81%	NDP	Green	9,471	7,086	1,122	413	530	–	–	18,622
Surrey-Guildford	NDP	Con	8,469	50.47%	1,564	9.32%	NDP	Green	8,469	6,905	1,079	–	–	327	–	16,780
Surrey-Newton	NDP	Con	8,003	54.72%	2,079	14.22%	NDP	CentBC	8,003	5,924	–	698	–	–	–	14,625
Surrey-Panorama	Con	Con	9,409	58.89%	4,075	25.51%	NDP	Green	9,409	5,334	807	426	–	–	–	15,976
Surrey-Serpentine River	Con	Con	10,857	58.22%	4,767	25.56%	NDP	CentBC	10,857	6,090	–	941	629	–	131	18,648
Surrey-White Rock	Con	Con	15,402	57.93%	7,658	28.80%	NDP	Green	15,402	7,744	2,055	556	635	196	–	26,588
Vancouver-Fraserview	NDP	Con	7,932	43.48%	239	1.31%	NDP	Green	7,932	7,693	2,617	–	–	–	–	18,242
Vancouver-Hastings	NDP	NDP	11,071	51.38%	5,727	26.58%	Con	Green	5,344	11,071	4,168	542	–	–	422	21,547
Vancouver-Kensington	NDP	NDP	8,316	46.86%	2,008	11.32%	Con	Green	6,308	8,316	3,121	–	–	–	–	17,745
Vancouver-Langara	NDP	Con	8,275	50.55%	1,909	11.66%	NDP	Green	8,275	6,366	1,317	413	–	–	–	16,371
Vancouver-Little Mountain	NDP	NDP	11,638	49.32%	3,693	15.65%	Con	Green	7,945	11,638	4,013	–	–	–	–	23,596
Vancouver-Point Grey	NDP	NDP	8,794	42.99%	744	3.64%	Con	Green	8,050	8,794	2,876	737	–	–	–	20,457
Vancouver-Quilchena	Con	Con	12,017	54.50%	6,036	27.38%	NDP	Green	12,017	5,981	2,065	1,127	859	–	–	22,049
Vancouver-Renfrew	NDP	NDP	8,702	54.53%	3,746	23.47%	Con	Green	4,956	8,702	1,949	351	–	–	–	15,958
Vancouver-South Granville	NDP	NDP	11,841	47.36%	4,505	18.02%	Con	Green	7,336	11,841	4,792	829	206	–	–	25,004
Vancouver-Strathcona	NDP	NDP	10,684	54.83%	5,004	25.68%	Green	Con	2,878	10,684	5,680	–	–	–	245	19,487
Vancouver-West End	NDP	NDP	9,930	51.56%	4,035	20.95%	Con	Green	5,895	9,930	3,433	–	–	–	–	19,258
Vancouver-Yaletown	NDP	Con	7,834	46.53%	884	5.25%	NDP	Green	7,834	6,950	1,493	560	–	–	–	16,837
Vernon-Lumby	NDP	Con	13,304	50.69%	3,384	12.89%	NDP	Green	13,304	9,920	1,842	–	1,178	–	–	26,244
Victoria-Beacon Hill	NDP	NDP	11,818	45.43%	1,256	4.83%	Green	Con	3,631	11,818	10,562	–	–	–	–	26,011
Victoria-Swan Lake	NDP	NDP	10,249	43.49%	1,893	8.03%	Green	Con	4,963	10,249	8,356	–	–	–	–	23,568
West Kelowna-Peachland	Con	Con	15,008	62.61%	7,941	33.13%	NDP	Green	15,008	7,067	1,895	–	–	–	–	23,970
West Vancouver-Capilano	Con	Con	16,039	67.14%	11,169	46.75%	NDP	Green	16,039	4,870	2,566	–	415	–	–	23,890
West Vancouver-Sea to Sky	Green	Green	11,834	47.79%	2,358	9.52%	Con	NDP	9,476	2,561	11,834	890	–	–	–	24,761

= open seat
= winning candidate was in previous Legislature
= incumbent had switched allegiance
= Conservative MLAs who had abandoned the party prior to dissolution, but returned after the election call
= previously incumbent in another riding
= not incumbent; was previously elected to the Legislature
= incumbency arose from byelection gain
= other incumbents renominated
= previously an MP in the House of Commons of Canada
= multiple candidates

==== Winning shares and swings ====
Summary of riding results by vote share for winning candidate and by swing
Electoral district and winning party			Vote share (Note: Share won by winning candidate, with difference noted from share achieved by the same party in 2024.)		Swing (Note: Positive indicates improvement to standing of party winning in 2024; negative points to 2024's second-place party being swung to.)		
Electoral district and winning party			%	Change (pp)	From	To	Change (pp)
Abbotsford South	Con	Hold	63.29	1.69	NDP	Con	3.34
Abbotsford West	Con	Hold	61.14	2.78	NDP	Con	5.27
Abbotsford-Mission	Con	Hold	56.64	1.26	NDP	Con	5.02
Boundary-Similkameen	Con	Hold	52.47	4.08	NDP	Con	2.95
Bulkley Valley-Stikine	Con	Hold	50.40	-1.91	Con	NDP	-4.69
Burnaby Centre	Con	Gain	47.25	4.53	NDP	Con	-9.88
Burnaby East	NDP	Hold	44.47	-7.38	NDP	Con	-4.91
Burnaby North	Con	Gain	46.28	3.28	NDP	Con	-7.20
Burnaby South-Metrotown	Con	Gain	44.50	2.92	NDP	Con	-4.09
Burnaby-New Westminster	NDP	Hold	55.63	-4.35	NDP	Con	-7.01
Cariboo-Chilcotin	Con	Hold	76.76	7.17	NDP	Con	10.18
Chilliwack North	Con	Hold	59.08	4.50	NDP	Con	4.39
Chilliwack-Cultus Lake	Con	Hold	59.74	5.17	NDP	Con	5.16
Columbia River-Revelstoke	Con	Hold	52.85	4.92	NDP	Con	6.73
Coquitlam-Burke Mountain	Con	Gain	52.55	3.40	NDP	Con	-7.49
Coquitlam-Maillardville	Con	Gain	49.30	9.73	NDP	Con	-9.87
Courtenay-Comox	NDP	Gain	45.33	6.77	Con	NDP	-1.59
Cowichan Valley	Con	Gain	42.67	5.08	NDP	Con	-1.62
Delta North	Con	Gain	53.54	13.32	NDP	Con	-12.71
Delta South	Con	Hold	59.77	4.70	NDP	Con	10.48
Esquimalt-Colwood	NDP	Hold	43.16	-8.31	NDP	Con	-4.10
Fraser-Nicola	Con	Hold	58.25	3.92	NDP	Con	5.83
Juan de Fuca-Malahat	Con	Gain	41.52	3.32	NDP	Con	-1.91
Kamloops Centre	Con	Hold	53.01	4.18	NDP	Con	7.14
Kamloops-North Thompson	Con	Hold	64.66	4.92	NDP	Con	4.38
Kelowna Centre	Con	Hold	48.16	5.31	NDP	Con	0.01
Kelowna-Lake Country-Coldstream	Con	Hold	47.81	-6.11	Con	NDP	-1.77
Kelowna-Mission	Con	Hold	58.43	6.94	NDP	Con	5.76
Kootenay Central	NDP	Hold	39.81	0.18	NDP	Con	-2.37
Kootenay-Monashee	NDP	Hold	47.80	-4.24	NDP	Con	-1.39
Kootenay-Rockies	Con	Hold	56.09	13.38	N/A (Note: Independent candidate came in second in 2024, but did not stand in 2026)		
Ladysmith-Oceanside	NDP	Hold	44.48	2.99	NDP	Con	-2.93
Langford-Highlands	NDP	Hold	44.71	-7.16	NDP	Con	-4.28
Langley-Abbotsford	Con	Hold	61.62	5.97	NDP	Con	7.89
Langley-Walnut Grove	Con	Hold	56.77	7.22	NDP	Con	10.13
Langley-Willowbrook	Con	Hold	52.41	4.17	NDP	Con	6.21
Maple Ridge East	Con	Hold	53.44	6.42	NDP	Con	7.76
Maple Ridge-Pitt Meadows	Con	Gain	48.33	3.22	NDP	Con	-6.75
Mid Island-Pacific Rim	NDP	Hold	47.00	-1.74	NDP	Con	-1.31
Nanaimo-Gabriola Island	NDP	Hold	48.28	-4.46	NDP	Con	-2.71
Nanaimo-Lantzville	NDP	Hold	46.79	-4.95	NDP	Con	-4.21
Nechako Lakes	Con	Hold	63.21	-4.23	Con	NDP	-0.34
New Westminster-Coquitlam	NDP	Hold	50.65	-8.48	NDP	Con	-6.42
North Coast-Haida Gwaii	NDP	Hold	61.83	-3.09	Con	NDP	1.77
North Island	Con	Hold	47.65	0.58	NDP	Con	1.23
North Vancouver-Lonsdale	NDP	Hold	46.98	-17.90	NDP	Con	-12.18
North Vancouver-Seymour	Con	Gain	46.73	10.94	NDP	Con	-13.14
Oak Bay-Gordon Head	NDP	Hold	36.92	-12.18	NDP	Con	-6.84
Peace River North	Con	Hold	85.71	11.34	Independent	Con	8.61
Peace River South	Con	Hold	77.68	7.83	Independent	Con	12.71
Penticton-Summerland	Con	Hold	45.32	3.95	NDP	Con	1.40
Port Coquitlam	NDP	Hold	45.30	-8.57	NDP	Con	-6.63
Port Moody-Burquitlam	Con	Gain	46.77	6.27	NDP	Con	-8.08
Powell River-Sunshine Coast	NDP	Hold	48.88	-0.74	NDP	Con	-2.12
Prince George-Mackenzie	Con	Hold	66.03	5.11	NDP	Con	4.79
Prince George-North Cariboo	Con	Hold	69.92	13.10	N/A		
Prince George-Valemount	Con	Hold	50.45	-4.75	NDP	Con	0.21
Richmond Centre	Con	Hold	57.18	5.19	NDP	Con	3.83
Richmond-Bridgeport	Con	Hold	67.93	9.74	NDP	Con	6.22
Richmond-Queensborough	Con	Hold	58.95	8.04	NDP	Con	9.39
Richmond-Steveston	Con	Gain	54.22	12.02	NDP	Con	-10.62
Saanich North and the Islands	Green	Hold	48.37	12.22	NDP	Green	13.34
Saanich South	Con	Gain	39.05	6.60	NDP	Con	-10.77
Salmon Arm-Shuswap	Con	Hold	54.61	2.49	NDP	Con	2.31
Skeena	Con	Hold	51.17	-0.03	NDP	Con	3.28
Surrey City Centre	Con	Gain	47.29	2.21	NDP	Con	-2.23
Surrey North	Con	Hold	57.62	6.95	NDP	Con	8.57
Surrey South	Con	Hold	61.40	2.56	NDP	Con	10.71
Surrey-Cloverdale	Con	Hold	53.07	4.75	NDP	Con	8.17
Surrey-Fleetwood	Con	Gain	50.86	5.94	NDP	Con	-8.25
Surrey-Guildford	Con	Gain	50.47	3.66	NDP	Con	-4.72
Surrey-Newton	Con	Gain	54.72	11.73	NDP	Con	-11.20
Surrey-Panorama	Con	Hold	58.89	9.29	NDP	Con	12.01
Surrey-Serpentine River	Con	Hold	58.22	8.52	NDP	Con	11.68
Surrey-White Rock	Con	Hold	57.93	5.61	NDP	Con	10.89
Vancouver-Fraserview	Con	Gain	43.48	6.86	NDP	Con	-10.94
Vancouver-Hastings	NDP	Hold	51.38	-12.77	NDP	Con	-6.64
Vancouver-Kensington	NDP	Hold	46.86	-14.04	NDP	Con	-9.04
Vancouver-Langara	Con	Gain	50.55	4.5	NDP	Con	-7.02
Vancouver-Little Mountain	NDP	Hold	49.32	-12.79	NDP	Con	-7.93
Vancouver-Point Grey	NDP	Hold	42.99	-13.78	NDP	Con	-9.31
Vancouver-Quilchena	Con	Hold	54.50	2.92	NDP	Con	7.35
Vancouver-Renfrew	NDP	Hold	54.53	-8.68	NDP	Con	-4.55
Vancouver-South Granville	NDP	Hold	47.36	-16.95	NDP	Con	-10.67
Vancouver-Strathcona	NDP	Hold	54.83	-13.34	NDP	Con	-5.51
Vancouver-West End	NDP	Hold	51.56	-11.45	NDP	Con	-7.42
Vancouver-Yaletown	Con	Gain	46.53	3.17	NDP	Con	-5.83
Vernon-Lumby	Con	Gain	50.69	9.72	NDP	Con	-7.31
Victoria-Beacon Hill	NDP	Hold	45.43	-1.92	NDP	Green	-4.52
Victoria-Swan Lake	NDP	Hold	43.49	-12.54	NDP	Green	-12.42
West Kelowna-Peachland	Con	Hold	62.61	11.76	NDP	Con	5.09
West Vancouver-Capilano	Con	Hold	67.14	20.46	NDP	Con	13.61
West Vancouver-Sea to Sky	Green	Hold	47.79	9.72	Con	Green	3.53

==== Changes in party shares ====
Share change analysis by party and riding (2026 vs 2024)
Riding	Conservative		NDP		Green	
Riding	%	Change (pp)	%	Change (pp)	%	Change (pp)
Abbotsford South	63.29	1.69	30.19	-4.99		
Abbotsford West	61.14	2.78	29.13	-7.74		
Abbotsford-Mission	56.64	1.26	35.85	-8.76		
Boundary-Similkameen	52.47	4.08	40.74	-1.82	–	-5.89
Bulkley Valley-Stikine	50.40	-1.91	46.32	7.46	–	-6.33
Burnaby Centre	47.25	4.53	42.06	-15.22	8.15	8.15
Burnaby East	42.95	2.43	44.47	-7.38	9.64	2.01
Burnaby North	46.28	3.28	42.14	-11.12	9.30	9.30
Burnaby South-Metrotown	44.50	2.92	44.07	-5.26	8.59	2.32
Burnaby-New Westminster	44.37	9.65	55.63	-4.35		
Cariboo-Chilcotin	76.76	7.17	17.23	-13.17	6.01	6.01
Chilliwack North	59.08	4.50	33.38	-4.28	–	-5.50
Chilliwack-Cultus Lake	59.74	5.17	40.26	-5.17		
Columbia River-Revelstoke	52.85	4.92	35.73	-8.53	11.42	3.60
Coquitlam-Burke Mountain	52.55	3.40	39.28	-11.57	5.98	5.98
Coquitlam-Maillardville	49.30	9.73	41.79	-10.01	8.92	2.60
Courtenay-Comox	42.43	3.60	45.33	6.77	9.78	-10.97
Cowichan Valley	42.67	5.08	42.35	1.85	14.58	-5.25
Delta North	53.54	13.32	40.63	-12.10	–	-6.20
Delta South	59.77	4.70	28.67	-16.26	8.29	8.29
Esquimalt-Colwood	29.11	-0.12	43.16	-8.31	22.92	3.61
Fraser-Nicola	58.25	3.92	28.65	-7.75	13.10	3.83
Juan de Fuca-Malahat	41.52	3.32	38.30	-0.49	17.44	-5.57
Kamloops Centre	53.01	4.18	30.83	-10.09	11.35	1.10
Kamloops-North Thompson	64.66	4.92	29.07	-3.83	–	-7.36
Kelowna Centre	48.16	5.31	47.98	5.29	–	-4.31
Kelowna-Lake Country-Coldstream	47.81	-6.11	32.68	-2.56	8.25	3.91
Kelowna-Mission	58.43	6.94	28.04	-4.57	10.22	5.29
Kootenay Central	36.58	4.91	39.81	0.18	19.86	1.12
Kootenay-Monashee	37.38	-1.48	47.80	-4.24	10.40	1.29
Kootenay-Rockies	56.09	13.38	27.40	5.65	7.20	2.02
Ladysmith-Oceanside	44.32	8.84	44.48	2.99	11.20	4.48
Langford-Highlands	38.79	1.39	44.71	-7.16	13.19	2.46
Langley-Abbotsford	61.62	5.97	23.93	-9.79	8.50	2.94
Langley-Walnut Grove	56.77	7.22	31.72	-13.05	7.22	2.10
Langley-Willowbrook	52.41	4.17	36.18	-8.25	7.72	0.39
Maple Ridge East	53.44	6.42	37.55	-9.09	7.57	1.23
Maple Ridge-Pitt Meadows	48.33	3.22	44.61	-10.28		
Mid Island-Pacific Rim	40.32	0.86	47.00	-1.74	12.68	0.88
Nanaimo-Gabriola Island	35.59	0.94	48.28	-4.46	16.12	3.52
Nanaimo-Lantzville	42.97	3.46	46.79	-4.95	9.92	1.17
Nechako Lakes	63.21	-4.23	23.65	-3.56	–	-5.34
New Westminster-Coquitlam	34.20	4.36	50.65	-8.48	15.15	4.12
North Coast-Haida Gwaii	28.45	-6.63	61.83	-3.09	9.72	9.72
North Island	47.65	0.58	43.05	-1.88	7.93	-0.07
North Vancouver-Lonsdale	41.57	6.45	46.98	-17.90	11.45	11.45
North Vancouver-Seymour	46.73	10.94	37.43	-15.34	10.91	5.31
Oak Bay-Gordon Head	30.38	1.49	36.92	-12.18	22.37	0.35
Peace River North	85.71	11.34	–	-5.49		
Peace River South	77.68	7.83	15.34	9.74		
Penticton-Summerland	45.32	3.95	41.40	1.16	8.03	2.79
Port Coquitlam	43.48	4.70	45.30	-8.57	8.67	2.27
Port Moody-Burquitlam	46.77	6.27	42.18	-9.88	8.24	0.81
Powell River-Sunshine Coast	39.18	3.50	48.88	-0.74	11.94	-1.54
Prince George-Mackenzie	66.03	5.11	23.77	-4.47	10.20	1.71
Prince George-North Cariboo	69.92	13.10	20.45	3.42	9.64	5.33
Prince George-Valemount	50.45	-4.75	29.77	-5.17	11.99	2.12
Richmond Centre	57.18	5.19	34.31	-2.47	6.02	6.02
Richmond-Bridgeport	67.93	9.74	32.07	-2.71	–	-3.21
Richmond-Queensborough	58.95	8.04	33.40	-10.73	7.65	7.65
Richmond-Steveston	54.22	12.02	35.06	-9.22	–	-3.44
Saanich North and the Islands	31.57	1.77	17.73	-14.45	48.37	12.22
Saanich South	39.05	6.60	34.82	-14.93	26.13	8.34
Salmon Arm-Shuswap	54.61	2.49	28.32	-2.13	8.32	1.25
Skeena	51.17	-0.03	37.85	-6.59	8.47	5.14
Surrey City Centre	47.29	2.21	44.45	-2.24	–	-6.09
Surrey North	57.62	6.95	33.11	-10.18	4.50	0.29
Surrey South	61.40	2.56	22.32	-18.84	5.11	5.11
Surrey-Cloverdale	53.07	4.75	33.99	-11.56	7.05	1.64
Surrey-Fleetwood	50.86	5.94	38.05	-10.56	6.03	-0.45
Surrey-Guildford	50.47	3.66	41.15	-5.78	6.43	2.11
Surrey-Newton	54.72	11.73	40.51	-10.66		
Surrey-Panorama	58.89	9.29	33.39	-14.72	5.05	5.05
Surrey-Serpentine River	58.22	8.52	32.66	-14.83		
Surrey-White Rock	57.93	5.61	29.13	-16.17	7.73	7.73
Vancouver-Fraserview	43.48	6.86	42.17	-15.01	14.35	8.15
Vancouver-Hastings	24.80	0.51	51.38	-12.77	19.34	8.49
Vancouver-Kensington	35.55	4.03	46.86	-14.04	17.59	10.01
Vancouver-Langara	50.55	4.50	38.89	-9.55	8.04	2.53
Vancouver-Little Mountain	33.67	3.07	49.32	-12.79	17.01	9.73
Vancouver-Point Grey	39.35	4.84	42.99	-13.78	14.06	5.34
Vancouver-Quilchena	54.50	2.92	27.13	-11.79	9.37	1.59
Vancouver-Renfrew	31.06	0.40	54.53	-8.68	12.21	6.09
Vancouver-South Granville	29.34	4.38	47.36	-16.95	19.16	8.43
Vancouver-Strathcona	14.77	-2.33	54.83	-13.34	29.15	16.09
Vancouver-West End	30.61	3.39	51.56	-11.45	17.83	8.75
Vancouver-Yaletown	46.53	3.17	41.28	-8.48	8.87	1.98
Vernon-Lumby	50.69	9.72	37.80	-4.89	7.02	7.02
Victoria-Beacon Hill	13.96	-5.19	45.43	-1.92	40.61	7.11
Victoria-Swan Lake	21.06	0.86	43.49	-12.54	35.45	12.30
West Kelowna-Peachland	62.61	11.76	29.48	1.58	7.91	7.91
West Vancouver-Capilano	67.14	20.46	20.39	-6.75	10.74	5.18
West Vancouver-Sea to Sky	38.27	2.66	10.34	-15.97	47.79	9.72

= did not field a candidate in 2024

=== Summary analysis ===
Party candidates in 2nd place
Party in 1st place	Party in 2nd place				Total
Party in 1st place	Con	NDP	Grn	Ind/Un	Total
Conservative		63		1	64
New Democratic	24		3		27
Green	2				2
Total	26	63	3	1	93

Principal races, according to 1st and 2nd-place results
Parties		Seats
█ Conservative	█ New Democratic	87
█ Conservative	█ Ind/Un	1
█ New Democratic	█ Green	3
█ Green	█ Conservative	2
Total		93

Candidates ranked 1st to 5th place, by party
Parties	1st	2nd	3rd	4th	5th
█ Conservative	64	26	3		
█ New Democratic	27	63	2		
█ Green	2	3	66	2	
█ Ind/Un		1	2	5	2
█ CentreBC			9	22	4
█ OneBC			6	23	4
█ Christian Heritage			1		2
█ Communist				3	
█ CanWest				1	1
█ Libertarian					4
█ Freedom					1

Resulting composition of the 44th Parliament of British Columbia
Source		Party			
Source		Con	NDP	Grn	Total
Seats retained	Incumbents returned	25	24	1	50
Seats retained	Incumbents returned - returned to party after election call	7			7
Seats retained	Open seats held	9	2	1	12
Seats retained	Ouster of incumbents changing allegiance	2			2
Seats changing hands	Incumbents defeated	17	1		18
Seats changing hands	Open seats gained	4			4
Total		64	27	2	93

=== Student Vote results ===
Student Vote elections are mock elections that run parallel to real elections, in which students not of voting age participate. They are administered by CIVIX Canada, in partnership with Elections BC. Student Vote elections are for educational purposes and do not count towards the actual results.

Summary of the 2026 BC Student Vote
Party	Leader	Seats			Votes		
Party	Leader	Elected	2024	±	#	%	Change (pp)
Conservative	Lorne Doerkson (interim)	41	40	▲1	34,376	32.42	▼3.71
New Democratic	David Eby	26	43	▼17	31,038	29.27	▼7.39
Green	Emily Lowan	24	10	▲14	27,310	25.75	▲6.40
CentreBC	Elenore Sturko	1	New	New	6,466	6.10	New
OneBC	Dallas Brodie (interim)	0	New	New	3,941	3.72	New
Independent		0	0	0	984	0.93	▼4.98
No Affiliation		0	0	0	478	0.45	▼4.98
Libertarian	Alex Joehl	0	0	0	520	0.49	▲0.07
Communist	Robert Crooks	0	0	0	455	0.43	▲0.19
CanWest	Wei Ping Chen	0	New	New	278	0.26	New
Christian Heritage	Rod Taylor	0	0	0	144	0.14	▲0.07
Freedom	Amrit Birring	0	0	0	54	0.05	▼0.71
Valid votes					106,044		—N/a
Rejected ballots					TBA	TBA	—N/a
Total votes cast		92 (Note: There are 93 seats overall, but as Chilliwack-Cultus Lake had no results, total adds up to 92)	93	Steady	TBA	100.00	—N/a
Source: Student Vote BC 2026 complete results

== Opinion polling ==

Opinion polls
Polling firm	Client	Dates conducted	Source	NDP	Con.	Green	OneBC	Centre	Others (Note: May implicitly include support for OneBC or CentreBC, depending on the poll)	Margin of error	Sample size	Polling method	Lead
2026 general election		Oct 24, 2026	—	37.38%	48.05%	10.97%	1.51%	1.62%	0.47%	—	1,796,615	Election	10.67
Forum Research	—N/a	Oct 23, 2026		40%	45%	12%	—	—	4%	4.0%	765	IVR	5
Mainstreet Research	—N/a	Oct 21–23, 2026		37%	43%	17%	2%	1%	—	3.0%	1,043	IVR	6
Research Co.	—N/a	Oct 21–23, 2026		40%	44%	10%	2%	2%	1%	3.5%	802	Online	4
Pallas Data	—N/a	Oct 22, 2026		39%	45%	12%	—	—	4%	3.7%	702	IVR	6
Ipsos	Global BC	Oct 20–22, 2026		39%	44%	13%	2%	1%	1%	3.3%	1,260	Online/Telephone	5
Leger	—N/a	Oct 20–22, 2026		39%	44%	13%	2%	1%	1%	3.0%	1,072	Online	5
Pollara	—N/a	Oct 15–21, 2026		37%	42%	13%	4%	3%	1%	2.1%	2,202	Online/IVR	5
Innovative Research	—N/a	Oct 15–19, 2026		38%	43%	12%	4%	2%	1%	—	1,000	Online	5
Angus Reid	—N/a	Oct 15–19, 2026		43%	46%	8%	1%	1%	1%	3%	793	Online	3
Mainstreet Research	—N/a	Oct 17–18, 2026		36%	42%	15%	5%	3%	—	3.3%	907	IVR	6
Pollara	Hotel Pacifico Podcast	Oct 15–18, 2026		36%	43%	12%	4%	3%	2%	3.1%	973	Online/IVR	7
		Oct 14, 2026	Leaders' debate is held.										
Pollara	Hotel Pacifico Podcast	Oct 8–13, 2026		36%	41%	13%	5%	4%	1%	—	1,212	Online/IVR	5
Leger	—N/a	Oct 9–12, 2026		40%	42%	9%	4%	3%	2%	3.1%	1,000	Online	2
Pallas Data	—N/a	Oct 10–11, 2026		38%	43%	11%	5%	2%	1%	4.3%	513	IVR	5
Research Co.	—N/a	Oct 9–11, 2026		42%	44%	8%	2%	2%	1%	3.5%	808	Online	2
Ipsos	Global BC	Oct 7–11, 2026		38%	43%	11%	4%	2%	2%	3.1%	1,356	Online/Telephone	5
Liaison Strategies	—N/a	Oct 7–8, 2026		37%	43%	10%	4%	3%	4%	3.1%	1,000	IVR	6
Pollara	Hotel Pacifico Podcast	Oct 1–7, 2026		38%	41%	11%	5%	4%	1%	2.6%	1,438	Online/IVR	3
Angus Reid	—N/a	Oct 1–3, 2026		43%	48%	7%	—	—	2%	3%	1,013	Online	5
Mainstreet Research	—N/a	Sep 30 - Oct 1, 2026		37.2%	44.7%	11.2%	5.7%	1.1%	—	3.4%	827	IVR	7.5
Pollara	—N/a	Sep 23–30, 2026		38%	38%	13%	5%	4%	2%	1.8%	3,017	Online/IVR	Tie
Ipsos	Global BC	Sep 25–29, 2026		40%	42%	10%	3%	3%	2%	3.7%	1,001	Online	2
Innovative Research	—N/a	Sep 25–28, 2026		41%	39%	11%	4%	3%	3%	—	500	Online	2
Leger	—N/a	Sep 24–28, 2026		36%	39%	13%	5%	5%	2%	3.1%	1,003	Online	3
Liaison Strategies	—N/a	Sep 26–27, 2026		39%	40%	11%	3%	4%	3%	3.1%	1,000	IVR	1
Angus Reid	—N/a	Sep 22–24, 2026		35%	43%	12%	4%	3%	3%	3.5%	801	Online	8
		Sep 22, 2026	A snap election is called for October 24, 2026. Peter Milobar resigns as CentreBC leader. Elenore Sturko assumes leadership of CentreBC.										
Liaison Strategies	—N/a	Sep 21–22		41%	36%	12%	4%	4%	3%	3.1%	1,000	IVR	5
		Sep 20, 2026	Kerry-Lynne Findlay resigns as leader of the Conservative Party of British Columbia; Lorne Doerkson is named the interim leader.										
		Sep 18, 2026	Peter Milobar assumes the leadership of CentreBC and it gains representation in the legislature.										
Innovative Research	—N/a	Sep 4–18, 2026		43%	39%	14%	—	—	4%	—	500	Online	4
Angus Reid	—N/a	Sep 8–15, 2026		41%	37%	13%	—	—	9%	4%	749	Online	4
Ipsos	—N/a	Sep 8–14, 2026		45%	35%	10%	2%	4%	4%	4.0%	800	Online	10
Research Co.	—N/a	Aug 12–14, 2026		44%	39%	10%	1%	5%	1%	3.5%	801	Online	5
604 Polling	—N/a	Jul 31 – Aug 8, 2026		35%	45%	12%	2%	2%	4%	2.9%	1,124	IVR	10
Yorkville Strategies	—N/a	Jul 28 – Aug 3, 2026		46%	40%	12%	1%	0%	2%	—	1,016	Online	6
Fairview Strategy	—N/a	Jul 6–17, 2026		44%	40%	12%	—	—	5%	—	896	Online	4
Angus Reid	—N/a	Jun 1–12, 2026		36%	47%	11%	—	—	6%	4%	755	Online	11
Research Co.	—N/a	Jun 3–5, 2026		42%	42%	9%	2%	3%	2%	3.5%	803	Online	Tie
Leger	—N/a	Jun 1–2, 2026		41%	45%	8%	—	—	6%	3.1%	1,002	Online	4
		May 30, 2026	Kerry-Lynne Findlay is elected leader of the Conservative Party of British Columbia.										
Angus Reid	—N/a	Apr 24–28, 2026		36%	46%	13%	—	—	4%	3%	804	Online	10
Mainstreet Research	—N/a	Apr 9–13, 2026		38.0%	32.8%	16.1%	10.9%	—	2.2%	2.8%	1,275	Smart IVR	5.2
Leger	—N/a	Apr 3–6, 2026		44%	40%	10%	3%	—	4%	3.1%	1,003	Online	4
Angus Reid	—N/a	Mar 11–17, 2026		42%	44%	9%	—	—	7%	4%	499	Online	2
Mainstreet Research	—N/a	Mar 11–13, 2026		39%	37%	12%	—	—	13%	3%	1,054	Smart IVR	2
Innovative Research	—N/a	Feb 6–Mar 3, 2026		39%	47%	10%	—	—	4%	—	991	Online	8
Pallas Data	—N/a	Feb 12–27, 2026		42%	40%	11%	5%	—	2%	2.8%	1,256	IVR	2
One Persuasion	Undisclosed	Feb 21–24, 2026		37%	41%	11%	6%	—	5%	3.1%	1,005	Online	4
Pallas Data	—N/a	Feb 12–14, 2026		42%	37%	13%	6%	—	2%	3.1%	988	IVR	5
		February 9, 2026	The BC Green Party ends its confidence and supply agreement with the BC NDP.										
Leger	—N/a	Feb 6–9, 2026		44%	39%	9%	5%	—	2%	—	1,007	Online	5
Leger	—N/a	Jan 23–26, 2026		44%	38%	9%	6%	—	3%	3.1%	1,003	Online	6
		Dec 21, 2025	Dallas Brodie reassumes leadership of OneBC.										
Mainstreet Research	—N/a	Dec 17–18, 2025		41%	41%	10%	7%	—	—	2.2%	1,902	Smart IVR	Tie
		Dec 13–16, 2025	Dallas Brodie is removed as leader of OneBC. Tara Armstrong subsequently leaves the party, and OneBC loses party status in the legislature.										
Pallas Data	Pacific Conservative Foundation	Dec 11–13, 2025		44%	39%	9%	7%	—	1%	3.2%	923	IVR	5
		Dec 3–4, 2025	John Rustad is removed as leader of the Conservative Party of British Columbia. MLA Trevor Halford becomes interim leader.										
Angus Reid	—N/a	Nov 26 – Dec 1, 2025		43%	40%	11%	—	—	8%	4%	463	Online	3
Yorkville Strategies	—N/a	Nov 24–25, 2025		40%	42%	8%	5%	—	4%	—	600	IVR	2
EKOS	—N/a	Nov 20–25, 2025		44%	35%	9%	8%	2%	3%	3.3%	889	Telephone	9
Angus Reid	—N/a	Oct 23–25, 2025		40%	41%	11%	5%	1%	1%	3%	1,044	Online	1
Abacus Data	—N/a	Oct 9–15, 2025		47%	40%	8%	1%	3%	—	3.1%	1,000	Online	7
Leger	—N/a	Oct 10–12, 2025		48%	38%	8%	—	—	7%	3.0%	1,035	Online	10
Cardinal Research	—N/a	Oct 4–6, 2025		42.5%	41.3%	10%	3.8%	—	2.5%	3%	1,088	IVR	1.2
Research Co.	—N/a	Oct 1–3, 2025		44%	38%	12%	1%	3%	1%	3.5%	801	Online	6
		Sep 24, 2025	Emily Lowan is elected leader of the Green Party of British Columbia.										
Angus Reid	—N/a	Aug 28 – Sep 5, 2025		42%	44%	10%	—	—	4%	3%	811	Online	2
Mainstreet Research	—N/a	Jun 23–24, 2025		41%	44%	7%	—	—	8%	3.2%	943	Smart IVR	3
		Jun 9, 2025	Independent MLAs Dallas Brodie and Tara Armstrong form OneBC.										
Research Co.	—N/a	Jun 7–9, 2025		43%	42%	8%	1% (Note: Poll asked about a prospective party with independent MLAs Dallas Brodie, Jordan Kealy, and Tara Armstrong. OneBC was announced after this poll was conducted.)	2%	3%	3.5%	803	Online	1
Leger	—N/a	May 23–25, 2025		45%	39%	11%	—	—	5%	3.04%	1,032	Online	6
Canadian Election Study	—N/a	Apr 29 – May 13, 2025		42%	34%	6%	—	—	18% Liberal 17% Others 1%	N/A	1,649	Online	8
Liaison Strategies	NEPMCC	May 2–4, 2025		45%	47%	7%	—	—	2%	3.45%	800	IVR	2
		Mar 28, 2025	Former MLA Karin Kirkpatrick forms CentreBC.										
Research Co.	—N/a	Mar 3–5, 2025		44%	42%	11%	—	—	3%	3.5%	802	Online	2
Pallas Data	—N/a	Feb 15, 2025		48.8%	40.7%	7.6%	—	—	2.9%	3.8%	677	IVR	8.1
		Jan 28, 2025	Sonia Furstenau resigns as leader of the Green Party of British Columbia. MLA Jeremy Valeriote becomes interim leader.										
Leger	—N/a	Jan 24–26, 2025		44%	42%	10%	—	—	4%	3.1%	1,001	Online	2
2024 general election		Oct 19, 2024	—	44.9%	43.3%	8.2%	—	—	3.6%	—	2,107,152	Election	1.6

=== Hypothetical voting intentions with BC Liberals on the ballot ===
Polling firm	Dates conducted	Source	NDP	Con.	Green	OneBC	Liberal	Centre	Others	Margin of error	Sample size	Polling method	Lead
Research Co.	Jun 3–5, 2026		35%	34%	9%	3%	15%	3%	1%	3.5%	803	Online	1

=== Riding polls ===
Polling firm	Client	Dates conducted	Source	Riding	NDP	Con.	Green	OneBC	Centre	Others	Margin of error	Sample size	Polling method	Lead
Mainstreet Research	Conservative Party of British Columbia	Oct 10–12, 2026		Surrey South	36%	47%	7%	—	7%	3% (Note: Unaffiliated candidate.)	5.4%	329	IVR	11

== See also ==
- 2025 Canadian federal election in British Columbia
