= Lorne Doerkson =

Premier of British Columbia since 2026

The Honourable Lorne Doerkson MLA
- Doerkson in 2026

38th Premier of British Columbia
- Incumbent
- Assumed office November 20, 2026
- Monarch: Charles III
- Lieutenant Governor: Wendy Lisogar-Cocchia
- Deputy: Claire Rattée
- Preceded by: David Eby

Leader of the Opposition of British Columbia
- In office September 20, 2026 – November 20, 2026
- Preceded by: Heather Maahs
- Succeeded by: Jennifer Whiteside

Interim leader of the Conservative Party of British Columbia
- Incumbent
- Assumed office September 20, 2026
- Preceded by: Kerry-Lynne Findlay

Member of the British Columbia Legislative Assembly for Cariboo-Chilcotin
- Incumbent
- Assumed office October 24, 2020
- Preceded by: Donna Barnett

Personal details
- Born: September 24, 1968 (age 58) New Westminster, British Columbia, Canada
- Party: BC Conservatives
- Other political affiliations: BC Liberals (before 2024)
- Spouse: Shelley Doerkson
- Children: 2

Lorne Isaac Doerkson MLA (born September 24, 1968) is a Canadian politician who has served as the 38th premier of British Columbia and interim leader of the Conservative Party since 2026. A member of the Legislative Assembly of British Columbia (MLA), he has represented the electoral district of Cariboo-Chilcotin since 2020.

Initially elected as a member of the BC Liberal Party, he crossed the floor in 2024 to the Conservative Party. Doerkson led the party to win a majority government in the 2026 election.

== Early life and career ==
Doerkson was born in New Westminster, British Columbia and moved to Salmon Arm, British Columbia when he was 13. At one time he was a rodeo rider. He has lived in the Cariboo-Chilcotin region for nearly three decades. He spent 20 years in the newspaper industry as a publisher with Black Press, focusing on communications and community outreach. After leaving the publishing sector, he transitioned to financial consulting with Investors Group, where he provided financial planning and advisory services.

Doerkson has been involved with several community organizations, including the Williams Lake Stampede, the Williams Lake Chamber of Commerce, the BC Community Newspaper Association, and the Hough Memorial Cancer Society. He has received two Community Booster awards from the Williams Lake Chamber of Commerce for his contributions to local initiatives.

== Political career ==
=== In Opposition ===
Doerkson was first elected as the MLA for Cariboo-Chilcotin in the 2020 British Columbia general election, representing the BC Liberal Party, which rebranded as BC United in 2022. During his first term, he served as the BC United caucus chair and critic for water, land and resource stewardship and rural development, as well as emergency management and climate readiness.

On May 13, 2024, Doerkson introduced Carter's Law, a private member's bill, to the B.C. Legislature. The bill was named after Carter Vigh, a youth who had passed away in 2023 due to an asthma attack brought on by wildfire smoke. The law sought to amend the B.C. Wildfire Act and protect British Columbians with respiratory conditions.

In May 2024, Doerkson announced his decision to join the Conservative Party of British Columbia, becoming the party's third member of the legislature. Doerkson was re-elected in the 2024 provincial election with 70.13% of the vote, defeating BC NDP candidate Michael Moses. In November 2024, he was named assistant deputy speaker of the Legislative Assembly.

=== Interim leader of the BC Conservatives ===
On September 20, 2026, following the resignation of party leader Kerry-Lynne Findlay, the board appointed Doerkson, who was visiting Amsterdam, as interim leader until a successor can be elected. On September 23, 2026, the party announced that should he become the premier following the 2026 general election, it would make efforts to amend its constitution to allow Doerkson to stay on as leader of the party. Under the current party constitution, a leadership election would need to be held and as interim leader, he would be barred from running in such an election under the current rules. The proposed constitutional changes would require a two-thirds majority vote at a meeting of the party's membership.

==== 2026 election ====
After David Eby called a snap election, Doerkson launched the Conservative Party campaign on September 22, 2026 by welcoming seven MLAs who had previously left the party, including former Conservative Party leadership candidate and CentreBC leader Peter Milobar, back to the party as candidates. His first policy announcement of the campaign was made on September 27, 2026 in Surrey, where he announced that a Conservative Party government would not increase taxes. Doerkson also announced his party's energy plan on September 28, 2026, which includes plans to double the province's liquefied natural gas (LNG) production by 2032 and triple it by 2035.

On September 29, 2026, Doerkson pledged that his party would temporarily remove the 10 per cent provincial sales tax from Canadian-produced wine, beer and spirits for the duration of the Canada–United States trade war. He also committed to maintaining the ban on U.S. produced liquor and to make more room for made-in-B.C. products. On October 1, 2026, in response to an announcement by prime minister Mark Carney and Alberta premier Danielle Smith that an oil pipeline to the West Coast would be fast tracked by Canada's Major Projects Office, Doerkson shared his support for the project, noting that it would give British Columbia's economy a "boost."

== Premier of British Columbia ==
On October 24, 2026, Doerkson became premier-designate of British Columbia after the Conservatives won a majority government in the 2026 British Columbia general election. They are projected to secure 63 out of 93 seats of the Legislative Assembly of British Columbia, unseating David Eby's NDP. Doerkson will be sworn in as a member on November 19, along with all 63 MLAs, with he and his cabinet taking office the following day.

== Political positions ==
Doerkson is described as a moderate conservative and part of his party's centre-right.

=== Taxes and resource development ===
Doerkson pledged to avoid introducing new taxes.

=== Healthcare ===
Doerkson said he supports provincial single-payer healthcare and emphasized the need to keep rural emergency departments and maternity wards open.

=== Public safety ===
Doerkson advocates ending open drug use in public places, discontinuing provincial safe-supply, increasing police and prosecutorial capacity, and expanding access to mental-health and addiction treatment.

=== Indigenous relations ===
Doerkson pledged to repeal British Columbia's Declaration on the Rights of Indigenous Peoples Act (DRIPA), arguing the legislation failed to resolve disputes and contributed to problems involving resource development and legal proceedings. The proposed repeal was opposed by Indigenous leaders, including Grand Chief Stewart Phillip, president of the Union of British Columbia Indian Chiefs, who argued the legislation provided a framework for Truth and Reconciliation.

=== Education ===
Doerkson called for repealing SOGI-related education resources and policies concerning sexual orientation and gender identity in schools, arguing it had become divisive, while maintaining schools should be a safe environment for students.

=== Abortion ===
Doerkson is pro-choice, stating abortion should be a woman's choice.

== Personal life ==
Doerkson resides in Williams Lake, British Columbia, with his wife, Shelley, where they raised their two daughters.

== Electoral history ==
2026 British Columbia general election: Cariboo-Chilcotin
Party	Candidate	Votes	%	±%	Expenditures
Conservative	Lorne Doerkson	14,988	76.56	+7.31	
New Democratic	Kathryn Askew	3,365	17.19	−13.22	
Green	Douglas Gook	1,173	5.99	—	
Total valid votes		19,526	99.73		
Total rejected ballots		52	0.27		
Turnout		19,578			
Registered voters					
Conservative hold		Swing		+10.27	
Source: Elections BC

2024 British Columbia general election: Cariboo-Chilcotin
Party	Candidate	Votes	%	±%	Expenditures
Conservative	Lorne Doerkson	13,714	69.59	–	$52,365.03
New Democratic	Michael Moses	5,992	30.41	−1.4	$23,077.93
Total valid votes/expense limit		19,706	99.54	–	$71,700.08
Total rejected ballots		92	0.46	–	
Turnout		19,798	60.04	–	
Registered voters		32,975			
Conservative notional gain from BC United		Swing		–	
Source: Elections BC

2020 British Columbia general election: Cariboo-Chilcotin
Party	Candidate	Votes	%	±%	Expenditures
Liberal	Lorne Doerkson	6,600	51.25	−7.52	$29,284.50
New Democratic	Scott Andrews	4,180	32.46	+6.23	$1,965.55
Green	David Laing	1,379	10.71	−4.29	
Independent	Katya Potekhina	457	3.55	–	$1,453.00
Libertarian	James Buckley	263	2.04	–	$0.00
Total valid votes		12,879	100.00	–	
Total rejected ballots					
Turnout					
Registered voters					
Source: Elections BC
