= Official Opposition Shadow Cabinet of the 40th Legislative Assembly of British Columbia =

Official Opposition Shadow Cabinet of British Columbia
- 40th shadow cabinet of British Columbia
- Date formed: June 14, 2013
- Date dissolved: April 11, 2017

People and organisations
- Opposition leader: Adrian Dix; John Horgan
- Member party: New Democratic Party
- Status in legislature: Official Opposition; 34 / 85(40%)

History
- Election: 2013
- Legislature term: 40th Parliament

The Shadow Cabinet of the 40th Legislative Assembly of British Columbia, comprising members of the BC New Democratic Party, was announced by Opposition leader Adrian Dix on June 14, 2013, following the 2013 general election.

== List ==
Critic	Portfolio	Duration
Adrian Dix	Leader, Official Opposition	2011–present
Doug Donaldson	Aboriginal Relations	
David Eby	Advanced Education	
Nicholas Simons	Agriculture	
Carole James	Children and Family Development	
Shane Simpson	Core Review, Gaming, Liquor Modernization, BC Pavilion Corporation, Legislative Accountability	
Gary Holman	Democratic Reform, and Deputy Critic, Environment and Deputy Critic, B.C. Ferries	
Rob Fleming	Education	
John Horgan	Energy, House Leader	
Spencer Chandra-Herbert	Environment	
Mike Farnworth	Finance	
Norm Macdonald	Forest, Lands and Natural Resource Operations	
Bill Routley	Deputy Critic, Forestry	
Judy Darcy	Health	
Jenny Kwan	Housing and CLBC	
Mable Elmore	ICBC, Deputy Critic Finance	
Bruce Ralston	International Trade, Asia Pacific Strategy, Multiculturalism, Immigration, Intergovernmental Relations.........Chair, Public Accounts Committee	
Harry Bains	Jobs, Employment, Labour and Worksafe BC	
Leonard Krog	Justice (Attorney General)	
Kathy Corrigan	Justice (Public Safety and Solicitor General)	
Selina Robinson	Local Government and Sports	
Sue Hammell	Mental Health and Addictions, Deputy House Leader	
Robin Austin	Natural Gas Development	
Jennifer Rice	Rural and Northern Health, Deputy Critic Children and Family Development	
Scott Fraser	Rural Economic Development, Mining and Fisheries	
Katrine Conroy	Seniors and Seniors Health, Columbia River Treaty, Columbia Power	
Doug Routley	Skills Training	
Lana Popham	Small Business, Tourism, Arts and Culture	
Jane Shin	Deputy Critic, Small Business, Tourism, Arts and Culture	
Michelle Mungall	Social Development	
George Heyman	Technology, Innovation, Citizens’ Services, responsible for Green Jobs, TransLink	
Claire Trevena	Transportation, Highways and B.C. Ferries	
Maurine Karagianis	Women’s Issues, Child Care and Early Learning, Shipbuilding	
Raj Chouhan	Assistant Deputy Speaker	

== See also ==
- Official Opposition Shadow Cabinet of the 38th Legislative Assembly of British Columbia
- Cabinet of Canada
- Official Opposition (Canada)
- Shadow Cabinet
- Official Opposition Shadow Cabinet (British Columbia)
