= Official Opposition Shadow Cabinet of the 38th Legislative Assembly of British Columbia =

The Shadow Cabinet of the 38th Legislative Assembly of British Columbia, constituting members of the opposition BC New Democratic Party, was formed under the leadership of Carole James in May 2005 following the general election.

== List ==
Portfolio	Shadow Minister	
Leader of the Opposition	Carole James	(2005-2010)
Opposition Caucus Chair	Jenny Kwan	(2005–)
Opposition House Leader	Mike Farnworth	(2005–)
Opposition Whip	Katrine Conroy	(2005–)
Critic for Aboriginal Relations and Reconciliation	Scott Fraser	(2005–)
Critic for Advanced Education	Gregor Robertson	(2005–)
Critic for Agriculture and Lands	Bruce Ralston	(2005–)
Critic for the Attorney General	Leonard Krog	(2005–)
Critic for Children and Family Development	Adrian Dix	(2005–)
Critic for Childcare	Diane Thorne	(2005–)
Critic for Citizen Services	Harry Lali	(2005–)
Critic for Community Services	Sue Hammell	(2005–)
Critic for Crown Corporations	Guy Gentner	(2005–)
Critic for Economic Development	Mike Farnworth	(2005–)
Critic for Education	John Horgan	(2005–)
Critic for Employment and Income Assistance	Claire Trevena	(2005–)
Critic for the Environment	Shane Simpson	(2005–)
Critic for Energy and Mines	Corky Evans	(2005–)
Critic for Ferries and Ports	Gary Coons	(2005–)
Critic for Finance	Jenny Kwan	(2005–)
Critic for Fisheries	Robin Austin	(2005–)
Critic for Forests and Range	Bob Simpson	(2005–)
Critic for Health	David Cubberley	(2005–)
Critic for Housing	Doug Routley	(2005–)
Critic for Human Rights, Multiculturalism and Immigration	Raj Chouhan	(2005–)
Critic for Intergovernmental Relations	Michael Sather	(2005–)
Critic for Labour	Chuck Puchmayr	(2005–)
Critic for Mental Health	Charlie Wyse	(2005–)
Critic for Municipal Affairs	Norm MacDonald	(2005–)
Critic for the 2010 Olympic Games	Harry Bains	(2005–)
Chair of the Public Accounts Committee	Rob Fleming	(2005–)
Critic for Public Safety and the Solicitor General	Jagrup Brar	(2005–)
Critic for Senior's Health	Katrine Conroy	(2005–)
Critic for Small Business, Revenue and Deregulation	Maurine Karagianis	(2005–)
Critic for Tourism, Sports and the Arts	Nicholas Simons	(2005–)
Critic for Transportation	David Chudnovsky	(2005–)

== See also ==
- Official Opposition Shadow Cabinet of the 40th Legislative Assembly of British Columbia
- Cabinet of Canada
- Official Opposition (Canada)
- Shadow Cabinet
