= Government House Leader (British Columbia) =

House leader of the governing party of British Columbia

Leader of the Government in the Legislative Assembly
- Incumbent; Trevor Halford since November 20, 2026
- Style: The Honourable
- Member of: Legislative Assembly; Cabinet
- Seat: British Columbia Parliament Buildings
- Appointer: Lieutenant Governor of British Columbia; on the advice of the premier
- Term length: At His Majesty's pleasure
- Salary: $0 (Note: According to the Members’ Remuneration and Pensions Act, the Government House Leader does not have a specific salary for their role. However, as a sitting member of the Legislative Assembly, they receive a $119,532.72 basic compensation.)

The Government House Leader of British Columbia is a frontbench member of the Legislative Assembly from the governing political party, who is tasked with planning and organizing the government's legislative business. The position is modelled on the federal Government House Leader in the House of Commons, and was established to lessen the workload of the Premier of British Columbia, who has executive duties outside of the legislature. The Government House Leader has a responsibility to consult with the house leaders of the opposition parties' caucuses to ensure that legislative business is conducted in an organized manner. The Government House Leader is also responsible for scheduling government bills and managing the daily legislative agenda in the Legislative Assembly.

Since at least 2009, British Columbia's government house leaders are also made members of the provincial executive council while they are serving.

== Government house leaders ==
Government house leaders since 1988
Portrait	House Leader	Constituency	Term of office		Party	Premier(s)
Portrait	House Leader	Constituency	Term start	Term end	Party	Premier(s)
	Claude Richmond	Kamloops	1988	April 1991	Social Credit	Vander Zalm (cabinet)
	Glen Clark	Vancouver-Kingsway	November 1991	September 1993	New Democratic	Mike Harcourt (cabinet)
	Moe Sihota	Esquimalt-Metchosin	1993	December 1999	New Democratic	Mike Harcourt (cabinet) Glen Clark (cabinet) Dan Miller (cabinet)
	Gary Collins	Vancouver-Fairview	June 2001	December 2004	Liberal	Gordon Campbell (cabinet)
	Mike de Jong	Abbotsford West	June 2005	October 25, 2010	Liberal	Gordon Campbell (cabinet)
	not on record		October 25, 2010	June 7, 2013	Liberal	Gordon Campbell (cabinet)
	Mike de Jong	Abbotsford West	June 7, 2013	July 18, 2017	Liberal	Christy Clark (cabinet)
	Mike Farnworth	Port Coquitlam	July 18, 2017	December 7, 2022	New Democratic	John Horgan (cabinet)
	Ravi Kahlon	Delta North	December 7, 2022	November 18, 2024	New Democratic	John Horgan (cabinet)
	Ravi Kahlon	Delta North	December 7, 2022	November 18, 2024	New Democratic	David Eby (cabinet)
	Mike Farnworth	Port Coquitlam	November 18, 2024	November 20, 2026	New Democratic	David Eby (cabinet)
	Trevor Halford	Surrey-White Rock	November 20, 2026	Incumbent	Conservative	Lorne Doerkson (cabinet)

== See also ==
- House Leader
- Government House Leader, for the equivalent position in the federal House of Commons
- Government House Leader (Ontario)
- Government House Leader (Quebec)
