= Official Opposition Shadow Cabinet (British Columbia) =

The Official Opposition Shadow Cabinet of British Columbia is composed of members of the official opposition political party in the Legislative Assembly of British Columbia who provide criticism to the administration of the government in British Columbia during question period or other sittings of the Legislature. Shadow ministers or critics are appointed to the shadow cabinet by the Leader of the Opposition.

Shadow ministers and critics have existed in British Columbian politics since the introduction of partisan politics in 1903, however the organization and membership of the shadow cabinet in British Columbia received very little media coverage prior to the 2010s.

== List ==
Official Opposition shadow cabinets since 2005
Shadow cabinets by parliamentary term	Leader	Party	Date announced	Date dissolved
Official Opposition Shadow Cabinet of the 38th Parliament	Carole James	New Democratic	June 19, 2005	April 14, 2009
Official Opposition Shadow Cabinet of the 39th Parliament	Carole James; Dawn Black (interim); Adrian Dix	New Democratic	June 11, 2009	April 16, 2013
Official Opposition Shadow Cabinet of the 40th Parliament	Adrian Dix; John Horgan	New Democratic	June 14, 2013	April 11, 2017
Official Opposition Shadow Cabinet of the 41st Parliament	Christy Clark; Rich Coleman (interim); Andrew Wilkinson	Liberal	August 3, 2017	September 21, 2020
Official Opposition Shadow Cabinet of the 42nd Parliament	Kevin Falcon	Liberal	December 8, 2022	September 21, 2024
Official Opposition Shadow Cabinet of the 42nd Parliament	Kevin Falcon	BC United	December 8, 2022	September 21, 2024
Official Opposition Shadow Cabinet of the 43rd Parliament	John Rustad; Trevor Halford (interim)	Conservative	November 20, 2024	present

== See also ==
- Cabinet of Canada
- Official Opposition (Canada)
- Shadow Cabinet
