= Mitzi Dean =

Canadian politician

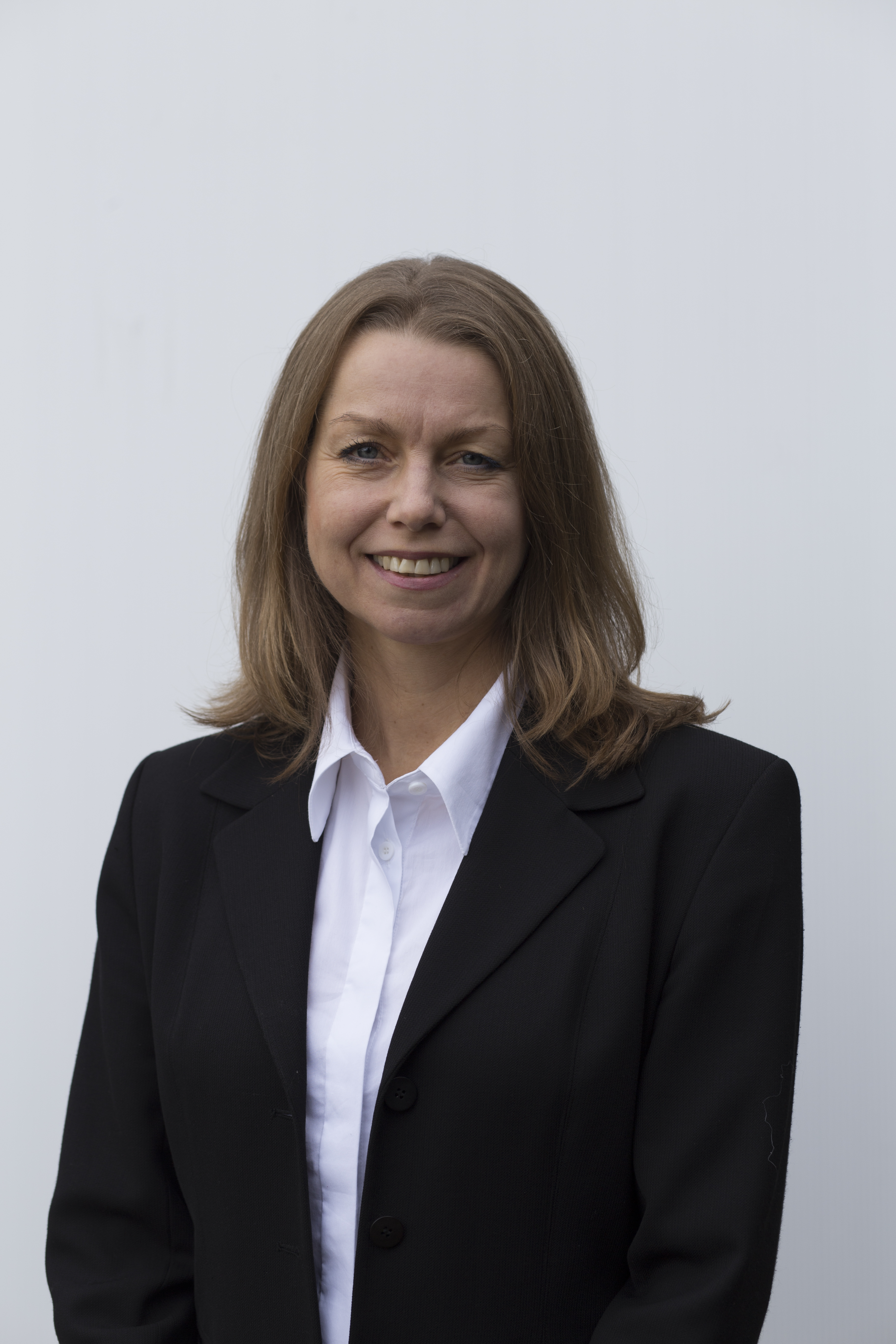

Minister of State for Child Care of British Columbia
- In office January 15, 2024 – November 18, 2024
- Premier: David Eby
- Preceded by: Grace Lore
- Succeeded by: Jodie Wickens

Minister of Children and Family Development of British Columbia
- In office November 26, 2020 – January 15, 2024
- Premier: John Horgan; David Eby
- Preceded by: Katrine Conroy
- Succeeded by: Grace Lore

Member of the British Columbia Legislative Assembly for Esquimalt-Metchosin
- In office May 9, 2017 – September 21, 2024
- Preceded by: Maurine Karagianis
- Succeeded by: Darlene Rotchford (Esquimalt-Colwood)

Personal details
- Born: 1968 or 1969 (age 57–58) Sevenoaks, England
- Party: New Democratic Party
- Education: Royal Roads University
- Profession: Administrator

Mitzi Jayne Dean (born 1968 or 1969) is a British-Canadian non-profit administrator and politician, who was elected to the Legislative Assembly of British Columbia in the 2017 provincial election and served until 2024. She represented the electoral district of Esquimalt-Metchosin as a member of the British Columbia New Democratic Party caucus. She served as Minister of Children and Family Development in British Columbia in the cabinets of John Horgan and David Eby.

== Private life ==
In the UK, Dean served in a fundraising role as a national development manager for children's services with the National Society for the Prevention of Cruelty to Children. She was born in Sevenoaks, England and worked in fundraising and development in organizations offering child protection social work and community-based social services across Great Britain for more than 20 years.

Prior to her election, Dean was appointed the executive director for Pacific Centre Family Services in 2007, having moved to Victoria from England in 2005.

In 2014, Dean received a certificate in executive study for six months of online part-time study at Royal Roads University.

== Cabinet positions ==
Dean was appointed as the province's Parliamentary Secretary of the newly created Gender Equity Secretariat, in the Ministry of Finance, in February 2018 by Premier John Horgan. She then served as the Minister of Children and Family Development. From January to November 2024, she served as Minister of State for Child Care.

== Electoral record ==
2020 British Columbia general election: Esquimalt-Metchosin
Party	Candidate	Votes	%	±%	Expenditures
New Democratic	Mitzi Dean	15,070	59.32	+13.07	$36,746.64
Green	Andy MacKinnon	6,140	24.17	−0.64	$9,644.51
Liberal	RJ Senko	3,940	15.51	−12.11	$16,844.69
Independent	Desta McPherson	254	1.00	–	$1,062.36
Total valid votes		25,404	100.00	–	
Total rejected ballots					
Turnout					
Registered voters					
Source: Elections BC

2017 British Columbia general election: Esquimalt-Metchosin
Party	Candidate	Votes	%	Expenditures
New Democratic	Mitzi Dean	11,816	46.25	$65,033
Liberal	Barb Desjardins	7,055	27.62	$52,675
Green	Andy MacKinnon	6,339	24.81	10,290
Libertarian	Josh Steffler	171	0.67	$200
Independent	Delmar Martay	102	0.40	$475
Communist	Tyson Riel Strandlund	65	0.25	$0
Total valid votes		25,548	100.00	
Total rejected ballots		84	0.33	
Turnout		25,632	65.88	
Registered voters		38,909		
Source: Elections BC
