= Jennifer Rice =

Canadian politician

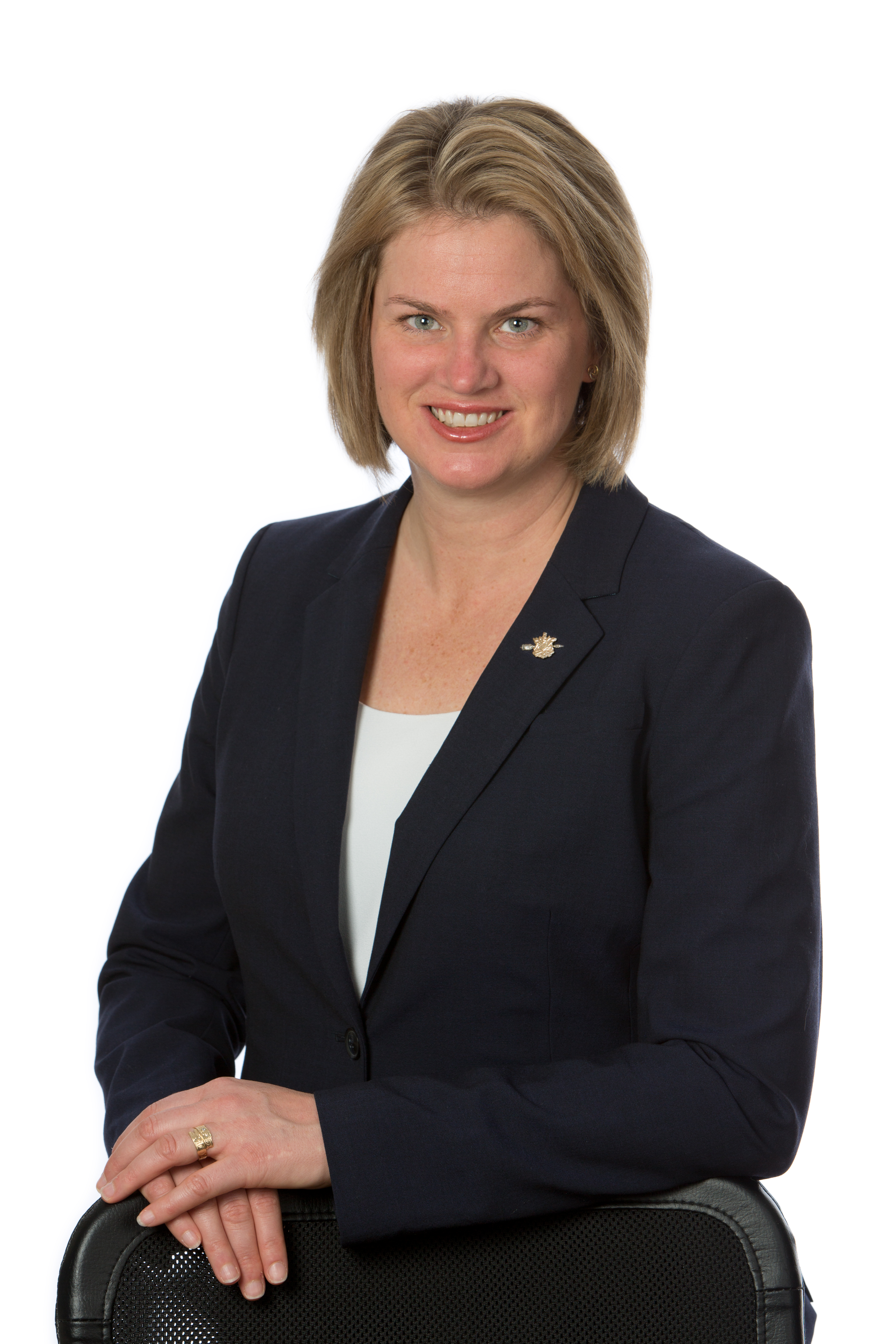
- Rice in 2017

Parliamentary Secretary for Rural Health of British Columbia
- In office January 20, 2023 – November 18, 2024
- Premier: David Eby
- Preceded by: Position established
- Succeeded by: Debra Toporowski

Parliamentary Secretary for Emergency Preparedness of British Columbia
- In office July 18, 2017 – January 20, 2023
- Premier: John Horgan; David Eby
- Preceded by: Naomi Yamamoto (As Minister of Emergency Preparedness)
- Succeeded by: Position abolished

Member of the British Columbia Legislative Assembly for North Coast
- In office May 14, 2013 – November 18, 2024
- Preceded by: Gary Coons
- Succeeded by: Tamara Davidson

Prince Rupert City Councillor
- In office November 19, 2011 – June 10, 2013

Personal details
- Born: 1973 or 1974 (age 51–52) Ottawa, Ontario, Canada
- Party: BC NDP
- Spouse: Andrea Wilmot
- Children: 2
- Profession: Biological technician

Jennifer Rice is a Canadian politician who served as a member of the Legislative Assembly of British Columbia (MLA) representing the electoral district of North Coast from 2013 to 2024. She is a member of the New Democratic Party.

During her time in the 40th Parliament of British Columbia, Rice held the role of Critic for Northern and Rural Economic Development and served as Deputy Critic for Children and Family Development. She introduced one private member’s bill, the Drinking Water Protection (Safe Water for Schools) Amendment Act, which aimed to mandate regular testing of drinking water in schools.

Before entering provincial politics, Rice served for 18 months as a municipal councillor in Prince Rupert, British Columbia. She moved to Prince Rupert to attend the Coastal Ecology Program at Northwest Community College (now Coast Mountain College) and worked in various roles, including as a biological technician, a staff member at the T. Buck Suzuki Environmental Foundation, and an instructor in scuba diving and kayaking.

== Background ==
Born and raised in Ottawa, Ontario, Rice worked at long-term care facilities and as an open water scuba diving and kayaking instructor. She moved to Prince Rupert, British Columbia in 2003 to attend Northwest Community College's applied coastal ecology program. She helped open the World Wildlife Fund's Prince Rupert office as a volunteer and a staff member. She acted as chair of the non-profit organization called the Friends of Wild Salmon, and went to work for the T. Buck Suzuki Foundation in 2009. During this time she was a vocal opponent of the Northern Gateway project. She was elected to the Prince Rupert city council in 2011, and was on council when they unanimously voted to oppose the Northern Gateway project.

Rice and her wife Andrea Wilmot have two children together.

== Provincial politics ==
After North Coast MLA Gary Coons announced his retirement in September 2012, Rice put her name forward as the NDP candidate for the riding in the next provincial election. She defeated teacher and president of the Prince Rupert District Teachers Union Joanna Larson at the January 2013 nomination election. In the May general election, Rice was challenged by Judy Fraser of the BC Liberal Party and college professor Hondo Arendt of the Green Party, though Rice was favoured to win. She won 4,617 votes to be elected the riding's MLA, and resigned as city councillor in June 2013.

=== 40th Parliament ===
Entering the 40th Parliament of British Columbia, Jennifer Rice was viewed as an MLA that provided the BC NDP with credibility on environmental issues. She was assigned to be critic on rural and northern health and deputy critic to the Ministry of Children and Family Development and appointed to the Select Standing Committee on Children and Youth. In this critic role she toured rural BC, including stops in Clearwater, Ashcroft, Quesnel, Dawson Creek, Fort Nelson, as well as Vancouver Island and the Gulf Islands, to consult with healthcare service providers, advocates, and new parents using maternity care. She also spent the third and fourth sessions on the Select Standing Committee on Health and the fifth session on the Select Standing Committee on Finance and Government Services.

Rice was vocal in drawing attention to the Highway of Tears and, in particular, advocating for implementation of the recommendation from the Missing Women Commission of Inquiry for more transportation options along Highway 16 between Prince George and Prince Rupert. Despite the Inquiry's recommendation, the provincial government's Passenger Transportation Board approved a reduction of intercity bus service, provided by Greyhound Canada, along that route in 2013. Along with fellow NDP MLAs Carole James and Maurine Karagianis, Rice traveled the highway together advocating for shuttle bus service. Over the next few years, the province committed funds to assisting communities in purchasing public transit vehicles, extending their routes towards Highway 16, and increasing the number of licensed drivers in First Nations. Regular bus service was eventually implemented and began in 2017.

In November 2014 Rice drew attention to the issue of charging passengers who use wheelchairs an extra $30 for a cabin on the Inside Passage and Haida Gwaii ferry routes, labelling the practice as unfair. In response Transportation Minister Todd Stone indicated he would reverse this practice.

Concerning liquefied natural gas (LNG), several export facilities were proposed or undergoing environmental assessments within her riding. Rice opposed the development of the Petronas Pacific Northwest LNG facility on Lelu Island, with its proposed bridge over the Flora Banks to the shipping terminal, due to its anticipated impacts to the Skeena River salmon ecosystem. Along with the region's other two NDP MLAs, Doug Donaldson of Stikine and Robin Austin of Skeena, she endorsed the signing of the Lelu Island Declaration by the Nine Allied Tribes of Lax Kw’alaams which called for permanent protection of Lelu Island and the Flora and Agnew Banks "as a refuge for wild salmon and marine resources", though the Tsimshian First Nations objected to the signing of the declaration. Rice expressed support of the development of an LNG facility within her riding given proper siting conditions.

Rice introduced a private member's bill in April 2016, Drinking Water Protection (Safe Water for Schools) Amendment Act (Bill M-215), which would require the regular testing of drinking water in schools. The bill was in response to elevated lead levels found in Prince Rupert and Kitimat schools, and had the support of the British Columbia Teachers' Federation. The bill did not advance beyond the first reading, but the government still adopted a system of reminders for school districts to test for lead on an annual basis and report back to the Ministry of Education. Independent MLA Vicki Huntington and political columnist Vaughn Palmer praised Rice for her work on drinking water safety.

=== 41st and 42nd Parliaments ===
As the 2017 general election approached, Rice was acclaimed as the BC NDP candidate in the North Coast riding. She was challenged by former Prince Rupert mayor and community relations advisor (for a company seeking to build a LNG facility) Herb Pond for the BC Liberals and Hondo Arendt again for the BC Green Party. Rice was re-elected with over 50% of the vote. With Rice's BC NDP forming the government beginning with the second session of the 41st Parliament of British Columbia, Premier John Horgan appointed Rice to be the Parliamentary Secretary for Emergency Preparedness within the Ministry of Public Safety. With the resignation of local Member of Parliament Nathan Cullen, Rice was considered as a suitable NDP nominee, however she declined.

She was re-elected in the 2020 provincial election, and stayed on as Parliamentary Secretary for Emergency Preparedness. She was re-assigned as Parliamentary Secretary for Rural Health by Premier David Eby on January 20, 2023. On May 16, 2024, Rice announced she would not be seeking a fourth term in the Legislature.

== Electoral history ==
2020 British Columbia general election: North Coast
Party	Candidate	Votes	%	±%	Expenditures
New Democratic	Jennifer Rice	4,544	72.82	+15.52	$20,456.05
Liberal	Roy Jones Jr.	1,429	22.90	−10.78	$10,919.11
Libertarian	Jody Craven	267	4.28	–	$0.00
Total valid votes		6,240	98.35	–	
Total rejected ballots		105	1.65	+0.48	
Turnout		6,345	40.45	-20.71	
Registered voters		15,686			
New Democratic hold		Swing		+13.15	
Source: Elections BC

2017 British Columbia general election: North Coast
Party	Candidate	Votes	%	±%	Expenditures
New Democratic	Jennifer Rice	5,242	57.30	+0.58	$32,367
Liberal	Herb Pond	3,081	33.67	+0.6	$60,058
Green	Hondo Arendt	826	9.03	−1.18	$945
Total valid votes		9,149	100.00		
Total rejected ballots		44	0.48		
Turnout		9,193	61.16		
Registered voters		15,030			
Source: Elections BC

2013 British Columbia general election: North Coast
Party	Candidate	Votes	%	±%	Expenditures
New Democratic	Jennifer Rice	4,617	56.72	−0.61	$67,356
Liberal	Judy Fraser	2,692	33.07	−1.91	$46,272
Green	Hondo Arendt	831	10.21	+2.52	$346
Total valid votes		8,140	100.0		
Total rejected ballots		51	0.62		
Turnout		8,191	52.85		
New Democratic hold		Swing		+0.65	
Source: Elections BC
