= Esquimalt-Colwood =

Provincial electoral district in British Columbia, Canada

British Columbia electoral district
- Location in Greater Victoria

Provincial electoral district
- Legislature: Legislative Assembly of British Columbia
MLA
Darlene Rotchford
New Democratic
- District created: 2021
- First contested: 2024
- Last contested: 2026

Demographics
- Census division: Capital
- Census subdivision(s): Colwood, Esquimalt (DM), Esquimalt (IR), New Songhees 1A, Victoria, View Royal

Esquimalt-Colwood is a provincial electoral district for the Legislative Assembly of British Columbia, Canada. Created under the 2021 British Columbia electoral redistribution, the riding was first contested in the 2024 British Columbia general election. It was created out of parts of Esquimalt-Metchosin and a part of Victoria-Beacon Hill.

It has been held by Darlene Rotchford from the NDP since 2024.

== Geography ==
The district comprises four municipalities in an arc around Esquimalt Harbour and the Royal Roads — the city of Colwood, the town of View Royal and the township of Esquimalt — plus the neighbourhood of Victoria West in the city of Victoria.

== Members of the Legislative Assembly ==
Assembly	Years	Member	Party
Esquimalt-Colwood; Riding created from Esquimalt-Metchosin and Victoria-Beacon Hill
43rd	2024–2026	Darlene Rotchford	New Democratic
44th	2026–present	Darlene Rotchford	New Democratic

== Election results ==
2026 British Columbia general election
** Preliminary results — Not yet official **
Party	Candidate	Votes	%	±%
New Democratic	Darlene Rotchford	10,955	43.25	-8.22
Conservative	Dave Johnston	7,391	29.18	-0.04
Green	Sidney Coles	5,766	22.77	+3.46
CentreBC	Sid Tobias	1,216	4.80	
Total valid votes		25,328	99.88	
Total rejected ballots		31	0.12	-0.00
Turnout		25,359		
Registered voters				
New Democratic hold		Swing		-4.09
Source: Elections BC

2024 British Columbia general election
Party	Candidate	Votes	%	±%	Expenditures
New Democratic	Darlene Rotchford	15,238	51.47	-7.9	$47,134.81
Conservative	John Wilson	8,652	29.22	–	$43,079.99
Green	Camille Currie	5,716	19.31	-4.5	$34,130.70
Total valid votes/expense limit		29,606	99.88	–	$71,700.08
Total rejected ballots		37	0.12	–	
Turnout		29,643	63.34	–	
Registered voters		46,799			
New Democratic notional hold		Swing		-18.6	
Source: Elections BC

2020 provincial election redistributed results
Party	%
New Democratic	59.4
Green	23.8
Liberal	15.9

== See also ==
- List of British Columbia provincial electoral districts
- Canadian provincial electoral districts
