= Port Coquitlam-Burke Mountain =

Defunct provincial electoral district in British Columbia, Canada

Coordinates: 49.274°N 122.746°W

Port Coquitlam-Burke Mountain was a provincial electoral district for the Legislative Assembly of British Columbia, Canada, from 2001 to 2009.

== Demographics ==
Population, 2001	55,201
Population Change, 1996–2001	9.5%
Area (km^{2})	2,247.47
Pop. Density (People per km^{2})	25

== 1999 redistribution ==
Changes from Port Coquitlam to Port Coquitlam-Burke Mountain included:

- Inclusion of Douglas Island
- Removal of Westwood and other areas in Coquitlam, east of Port Moody

== Electoral history ==
Assembly	Years	Member	Party
Port Coquitlam prior to 2001
37th	2001–2005	Karn Manhas	Liberal
38th	2005–2009	Mike Farnworth	New Democratic
Port Coquitlam from 2009

== Members of the Legislative Assembly ==
The riding's most prominent MLA was Mike Farnworth, who was also MLA for the area from 1991 to 2001. He represents the New Democratic Party of British Columbia. He served almost the entirety of the riding's existence, except from 2001 to 2005 when Karn Manhas of the Liberals defeated him in what was a landslide victory for the Liberals in that election.

== Election results ==
2005 British Columbia general election: Port Coquitlam-Burke Mountain
Party	Candidate	Votes	%	±%
NDP	Mike Farnworth	11,844	48.14%	
Liberal	Greg Moore	10,752	43.70%	
Green	Bill Aaroe	1,691	6.87%	
Social Credit	Anthony Yao	228	0.93%	
Libertarian	Lewis Dahlby	90	0.37%	
Total		24,605		

2001 British Columbia general election: Port Coquitlam-Burke Mountain
Party	Candidate	Votes	%	±	Expenditures
Liberal	Karn Manhas	9,963	45.19%		$49,642
NDP	Mike Farnworth	7,198	32.65%		$31,152
Unity	Chris Delaney	2,297	10.42%		$13,849
Green	Kelli Gallagher	1,841	8.36%	–	$44
Marijuana	Doug Hewer	446	2.02%		$394
Independent	Craig Braconnier	151	0.68%		
Reform	Clay Fanstone	150	0.68%		$468
Total valid votes		22,046	100.00%		
Total rejected ballots		54	0.24%		
Turnout		22,100	74.66%		

== See also ==
- List of British Columbia provincial electoral districts
- Canadian provincial electoral districts
