= Gary Coons =

Canadian politician and teacher

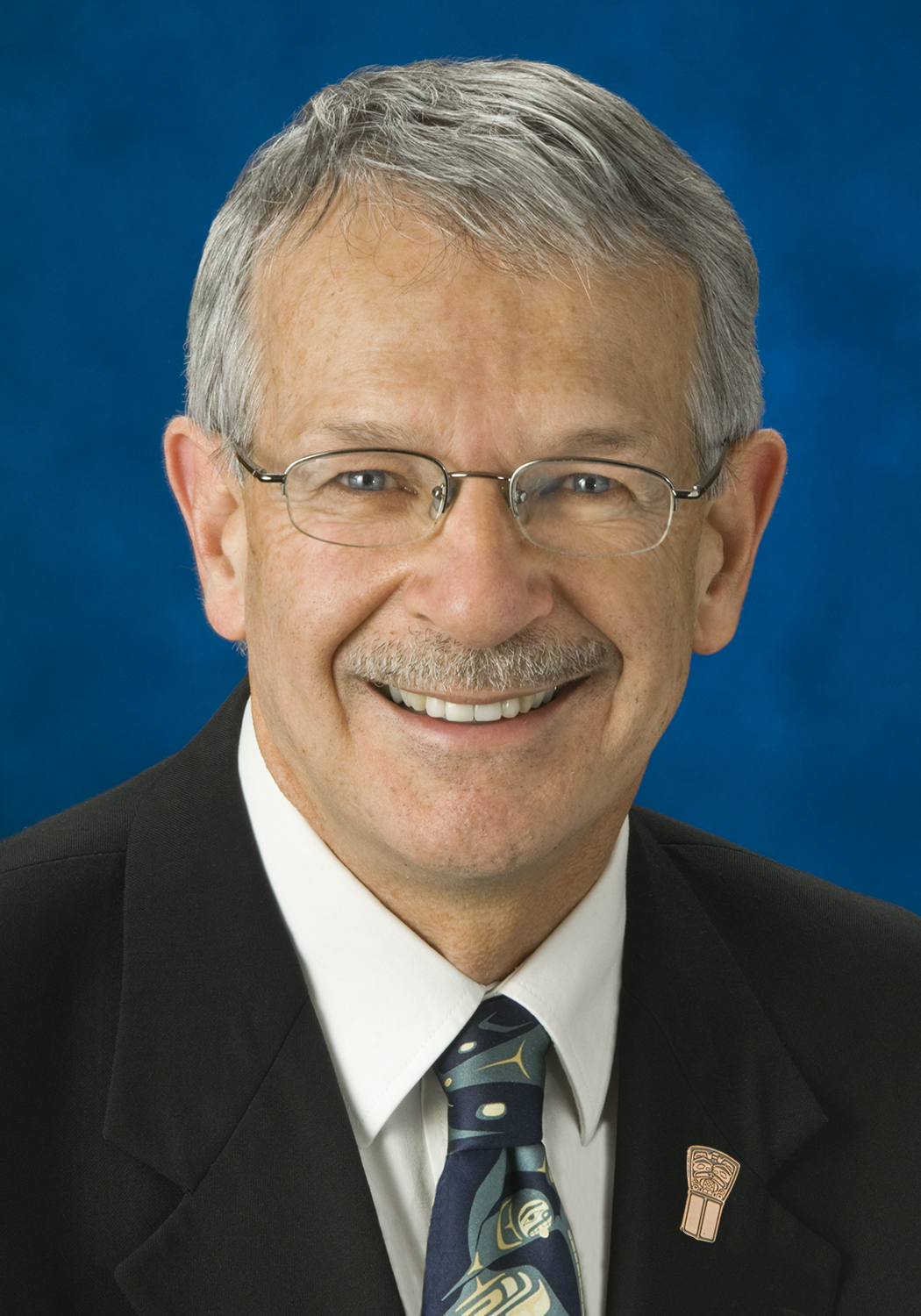

Member of the British Columbia Legislative Assembly for North Coast
- In office May 17, 2005 – May 14, 2013
- Preceded by: Bill Belsey
- Succeeded by: Jennifer Rice

Personal details
- Born: Gary Earl Coons; August 1950 (age 76) Winnipeg, Manitoba
- Party: New Democratic
- Spouse: Lois Elliot
- Education: University of Western Ontario (BA)
- Occupation: teacher

Gary Earl Coons (born 1950) is a Canadian politician and educator who served as a member of the Legislative Assembly of British Columbia (MLA) from 2005 to 2013. A member of the British Columbia New Democratic Party (BC NDP), he was elected to represent the riding of North Coast.

== Early life and education ==
Gary Coons was born in Winnipeg. Shortly after his birth, his family relocated to Lachine, Quebec, then a suburb of Montreal, before moving to Burlington, Ontario in 1967. He played junior "B" hockey with the Burlington Mohawks and graduated from Nelson High School after completing grades 11 through 13.

Coons attended the University of Western Ontario in London, earning a Bachelor of Arts in Mathematics and a Bachelor of Education, specializing in Math and Physical Education. While at university, Coons continued playing hockey, advancing to junior "A" with the St. Thomas Elgins before joining the university's Mustangs hockey team. During this time, he set a university league record for penalty minutes.

== Early career ==
After completing his education, Coons moved to Prince George, British Columbia in 1976, where he worked at a juvenile detention centre and played for the Prince George Mohawks. In 1977, he began his teaching career as a special education teacher at Booth Memorial Junior Secondary School in Prince Rupert. He also joined the Prince Rupert Kings, eventually becoming the team's captain. He briefly left teaching in 1980 to coordinate the 1981 Northern BC Winter Games, hosted in Prince Rupert. Following the event, Coons explored the commercial fishing industry as a gill netter before returning to education.

In 1982, Coons resumed teaching at Booth Memorial Junior Secondary, focusing on mathematics. By 1986, he became the head instructor at Kaien Alternate School, a role he held until 1992, when he participated in a teaching exchange program in Australia. Upon his return to Prince Rupert, Coons joined Charles Hays Secondary School as a math and physical education teacher. His passion for sports extended to community coaching in baseball, soccer, and hockey.

Coons was also active within the British Columbia Teachers' Federation (BCTF), advocating for social justice and serving in various capacities from 1983 to 2005. His first significant political involvement came in 1983 when he joined the Solidarity Coalition's protests against provincial legislation targeting human rights, labour, and education. From 2001 to 2004, Coons served as president of the Prince Rupert District Teachers' Union, a local chapter of the BCTF.

== Political career ==
Coons was nominated as the BC New Democratic Party's candidate for the North Coast riding in 2005, and defeated the incumbent Liberal candidate Bill Belsey in that May's general election to become the riding's MLA; he was re-elected in 2009. During his time in the legislature, he served as opposition critic for BC Ferries and Coastal Communities, and sat on the Special Committee for Sustainable Aquaculture, the Select Standing Committee on Aboriginal Affairs, and the Select Standing Committee on Crown Corporations. He is reported as one of thirteen NDP caucus members who forced the resignation of Carole James as party leader in December 2010.

He announced his retirement as MLA in September 2012, and was replaced in his critic role by Maurine Karagianis in February 2013 before finishing his term. He was named to the B.C. Ferry Authority's board of directors in 2021, and was appointed to a second term in 2024.

== Personal life ==
In 1981, Coons married Lois Elliot, a fellow educator in Prince Rupert who teaches at Pineridge Elementary School. The couple has two children, Hannah and Breton.

== Electoral record ==
2005 British Columbia general election: North Coast
Party	Candidate	Votes	%	±%	Expenditures
New Democratic	Gary Coons	5,845	53.77	+16.16	$55,751
Liberal	Bill Belsey	4,185	38.50	−6.75	$138,287
Green	Hondo Arendt	629	5.79	+0.63	$780
Marijuana	David Johns	211	1.94	−3.80	$100
Total valid votes		10,870	100.00		
Total rejected ballots		47	0.43		
Turnout		10,917	60.86		
New Democratic gain from Liberal		Swing		+11.46	
Source: Elections BC
