= Tamara Davidson =

Canadian politician

Tamara Davidson MLA
- Laanas
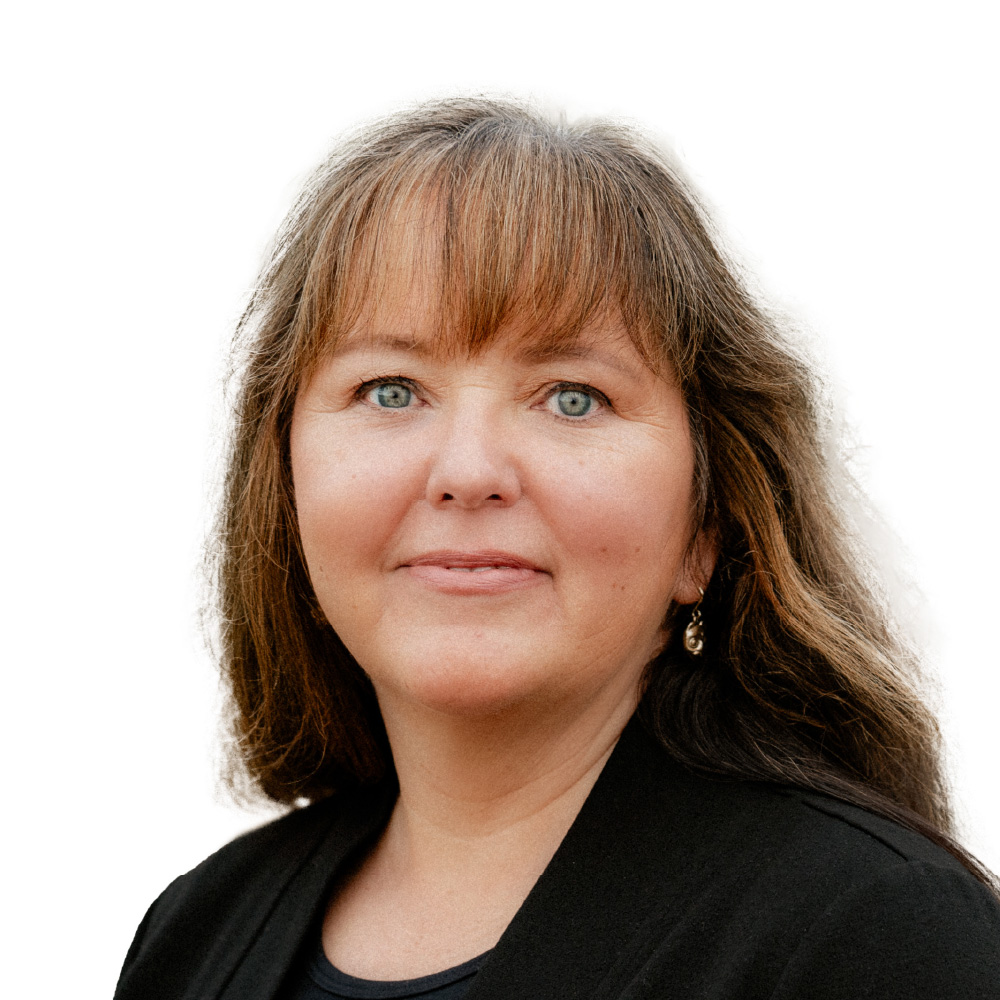
- Campaign portrait, 2024

Minister of Environment and Parks of British Columbia
- In office November 18, 2024 – November 20, 2026
- Premier: David Eby
- Preceded by: George Heyman
- Succeeded by: Áʼa꞉líya Warbus

Member of the British Columbia Legislative Assembly for North Coast-Haida Gwaii
- Incumbent
- Assumed office October 19, 2024
- Preceded by: Jennifer Rice

Personal details
- Party: New Democratic

Tamara Davidson MLA (also known by her Haida name Laanas) is a Canadian politician who has served as a member of the Legislative Assembly of British Columbia (MLA) representing the electoral district of North Coast-Haida Gwaii since 2024. She is a member of the New Democratic Party. Prior to entering provincial politics, she served on the Council of the Haida Nation.

== Electoral history ==
2026 British Columbia general election: North Coast-Haida Gwaii
** Preliminary results — Not yet official **
Party	Candidate	Votes	%	±%
New Democratic	Tamara Davidson	4,305	61.57	
Conservative	Rodney Proskiw	1,981	28.33	
Green	Francis Racy	677	9.68	
Total valid votes		6,963	99.59	
Total rejected ballots		29	0.41	
Turnout		6,992		
Registered voters				
Source: Elections BC
New Democratic hold		Swing		+1.39

2024 British Columbia general election: North Coast-Haida Gwaii
Party	Candidate	Votes	%	±%	Expenditures
New Democratic	Tamara Davidson	4,863	64.92	-7.90	$29,415.53
Conservative	Chris Sankey	2,628	35.08	–	$36,095.33
Total valid votes/expense limit		7,491	99.32	–	$71,700.08
Total rejected ballots		51	0.68	–	
Turnout		7,542	48.60	+8.15	
Registered voters		15,518			
New Democratic hold		Swing		-21.49	
Source: Elections BC
