= Jeff Bray (politician) =

Canadian politician from British Columbia (born 1964)

Member of the British Columbia Legislative Assembly for Victoria-Beacon Hill
- In office May 16, 2001 – May 17, 2005
- Preceded by: Gretchen Brewin
- Succeeded by: Carole James

Personal details
- Born: 1964 (age 61–62) Vancouver, BC
- Party: BC Liberal

Jeff Bray (born 1964) is the CEO of the Downtown Victoria Business Association. He is a former Canadian politician, who served as a BC Liberal Member of the Legislative Assembly of British Columbia from 2001 to 2005, representing the riding of Victoria-Beacon Hill.
