= Grace Lore =

Canadian politician

Grace Lore MLA
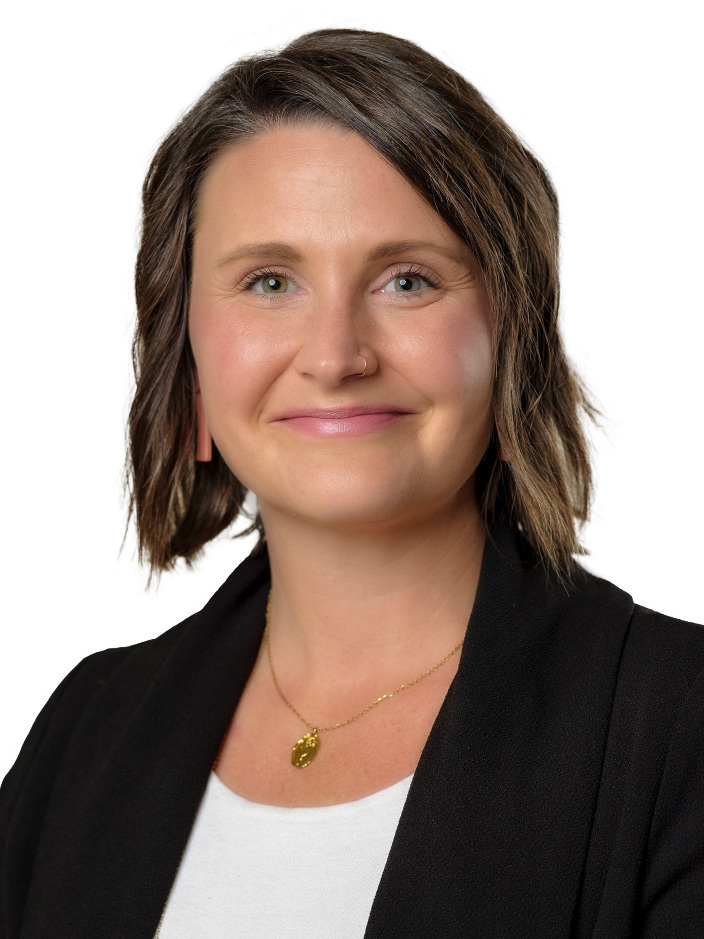
- Campaign portrait, 2024

Minister without Portfolio
- In office December 10, 2024 – November 20, 2026
- Premier: David Eby

Minister of Children and Family Development of British Columbia
- In office January 15, 2024 – December 10, 2024
- Premier: David Eby
- Preceded by: Mitzi Dean
- Succeeded by: Jodie Wickens (acting)

Minister of State for Child Care of British Columbia
- In office December 7, 2022 – January 15, 2024
- Premier: David Eby
- Preceded by: Katrina Chen
- Succeeded by: Mitzi Dean

Parliamentary Secretary for Gender Equity of British Columbia
- In office December 7, 2022 – January 15, 2024
- Premier: John Horgan; David Eby
- Preceded by: Position established
- Succeeded by: Kelli Paddon

Member of the British Columbia Legislative Assembly for Victoria-Beacon Hill
- Incumbent
- Assumed office October 24, 2020
- Preceded by: Carole James

Personal details
- Born: Calgary, Alberta, Canada
- Party: New Democratic
- Spouse: Rob Lore
- Children: 2
- Education: University of British Columbia; London School of Economics

Grace Lore MLA is a Canadian politician who has served as a member of the Legislative Assembly of British Columbia (MLA) representing the riding of Victoria-Beacon Hill since 2020. A member of the New Democratic Party, she sat in cabinet from 2022 until 2026.

== Early life and education ==
Lore was born in Calgary, Alberta. She studied political science at the University of British Columbia. Afterwards, she attended London School of Economics for her Master's before returning to UBC for her PhD. Starting in 2018, she began working as a lecturer at the University of Victoria. Lore teaches Canadian politics, gender and politics, and research methods.

== Political career ==
On December 7, 2022, Lore was appointed the Minister of State for Child Care. She was then appointed as Minister of Children and Family Development on January 15, 2024.

Lore was re-elected in the 2024 British Columbia general election, defeating Sonia Furstenau, leader of the Green Party. She was re-appointed as Minister of Children and Family Development in November 2024, but temporarily stepped down for medical reasons in December 2024.

== Personal life ==
Lore and her husband, Rob, have two children. Her son was treated for a brain tumor in 2021, only months after she was first elected.

=== Health ===
In November 2024, Lore was diagnosed with colorectal cancer and subsequently stepped back from her cabinet duties while continuing to serve as MLA. She has since undergone chemotherapy, radiation, and surgery, and has provided periodic public updates on her recovery.

== Electoral history ==
2024 British Columbia general election: Victoria-Beacon Hill
Party	Candidate	Votes	%	±%	Expenditures
New Democratic	Grace Lore	13,350	47.34	-7.4	
Green	Sonia Furstenau	9,441	33.48	+3.3	
Conservative	Tim Thielmann	5,410	19.18	–	
Total valid votes		28,201	–		
Total rejected ballots					
Turnout					
Registered voters					
New Democratic notional hold		Swing		-5.4	
Source: Elections BC

2020 British Columbia general election: Victoria-Beacon Hill
Party	Candidate	Votes	%	±%	Expenditures
New Democratic	Grace Lore	16,474	54.61	+1.56	$33,454.50
Green	Jenn Neilson	9,031	29.93	−0.45	$29,344.41
Liberal	Karen Bill	4,329	14.35	−1.14	$2,251.45
Independent	Jordan Reichert	335	1.11	+0.65	$0.00
Total valid votes		30,169	100.00	–	
Total rejected ballots		244	0.80	+0.42	
Turnout		30,413	61.46	–2.74	
Registered voters		49,484			
New Democratic hold		Swing		+1.01	
Source: Elections BC

British Columbia provincial government of David Eby
Cabinet post (1)
Predecessor	Office	Successor
Katrina Chen	Minister of State for Child Care; December 7, 2022 –	Incumbent
