= Karn Manhas =

Canadian businessman, entrepreneur and politician

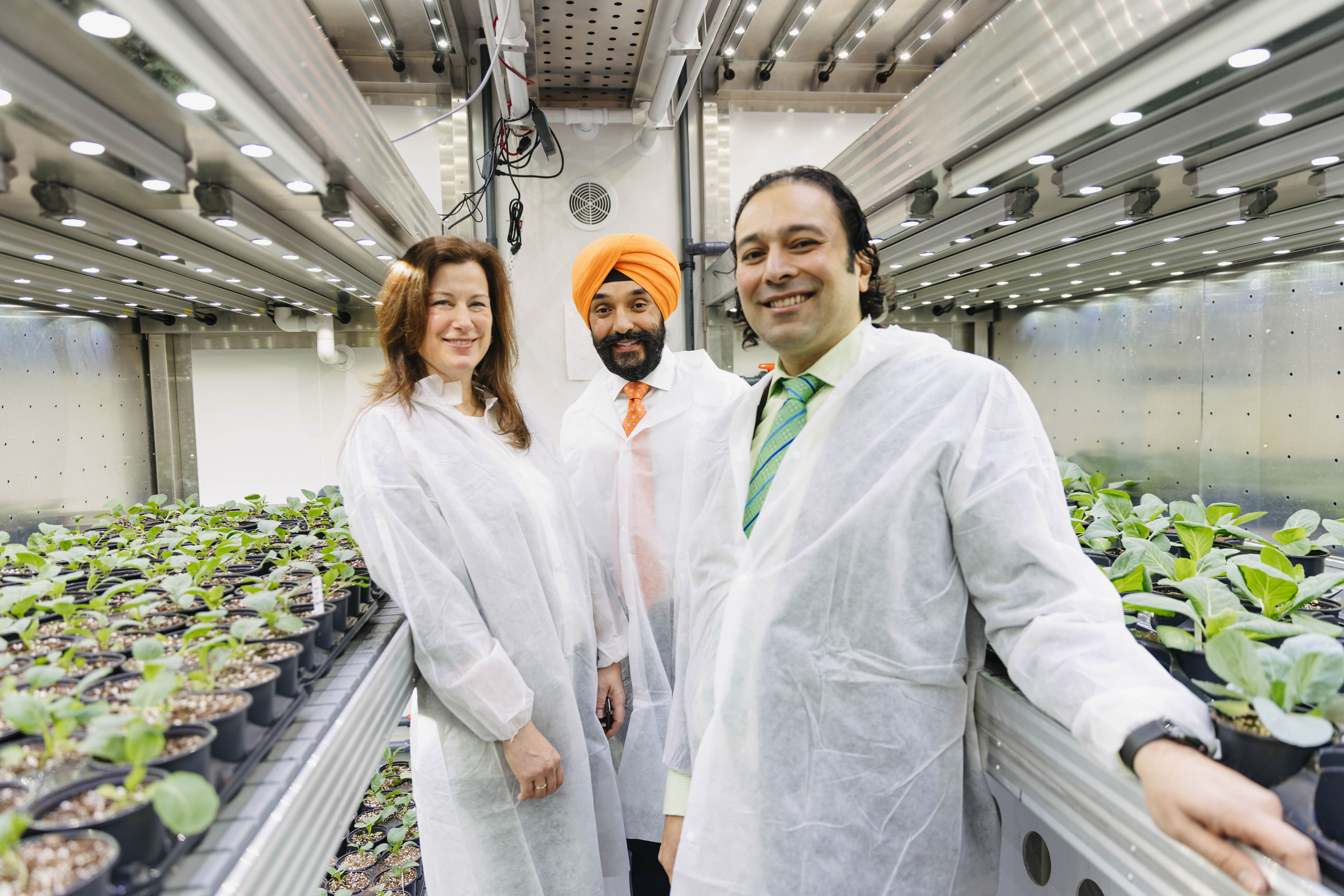
- Manhas, Annett Rozek, and Navdeep Bains in 2020

Member of the British Columbia Legislative Assembly for Port Coquitlam-Burke Mountain
- In office May 16, 2001 – May 17, 2005
- Preceded by: Mike Farnworth
- Succeeded by: Mike Farnworth

Personal details
- Born: 1976 Orange County, California
- Party: BC Liberal
- Occupation: businessman
- Known for: Founder and CEO of Terramera

Karn Manhas (born 1976) is a Canadian businessman, entrepreneur and a former politician, who served as a BC Liberal Member of the Legislative Assembly of British Columbia from 2001 until 2005, when he chose not to run again. He represented the riding of Port Coquitlam-Burke Mountain. Manhas was the youngest MLA ever elected in the history of the province of British Columbia.

Manhas holds a Juris Doctor in Law from the University of British Columbia, and a B.Sc. in biology (Genetics) and Biotechnology from McGill University. He formed a tech consulting firm, Karyon Group, which ended in 2008–2009. In 2012, he was named as one of Business In Vancouver's Top Forty Under 40 business people. He is frequently called to speak on issues of sustainability, including at TEDx and Singularity University in Vancouver.

Manhas is the founder of Terramera, a Vancouver-based ag/bio technology company that develops plant-based products, including organic biopesticides and biofertilzers. Terramera's proprietary technology known as Actigate has garnered recognition both in BC and abroad and has lifted the company onto the 2019 Global Cleantech 100 list.
