= Bill Belsey =

Canadian politician

Member of the British Columbia Legislative Assembly for North Coast
- In office May 16, 2001 – May 17, 2005
- Preceded by: Dan Miller
- Succeeded by: Gary Coons

Personal details
- Party: Liberal

Bill Belsey is a Canadian politician who served as a member of the Legislative Assembly of British Columbia (MLA) from 2001 to 2005. A member of the BC Liberal Party, he was elected to represent the riding of North Coast. Following his time in office, he continued his involvement in politics and the community, holding various leadership roles and maintaining active participation in public and private sector initiatives.

== Early life and education ==
Belsey earned a diploma in physical metallurgy from the British Columbia Institute of Technology in 1969. In 1975, he obtained certification as an Air Mix Gas Diver from the U.S. College of Oceaneering. His professional qualifications enabled him to work across British Columbia and Canada before settling in Prince Rupert in 1978.

== Early career ==
Before entering politics, Belsey worked in various industries. He served as manager of maintenance and engineering at Skeena Cellulose's pulp operations. Belsey also owned and operated three businesses on the North Coast, employing up to 50 workers. His most recent business provided testing, inspection, and diving services to the pulp and paper industry.

In addition to his professional roles, Belsey was a member of several industry and community organizations, including the Forest Industries Trade Committee, the Rupert Port Authority Nominating Committee, and the North Coast Oil and Gas Task Force.

== Political career ==
Belsey was elected as the MLA for the North Coast riding in the 2001 provincial general election. During his tenure, he served on several legislative select standing committees, including the Committee on Finance and Government Services, which he chaired, as well as the Committees on Public Accounts, Legislative Initiatives, Parliamentary Reform, Ethical Conduct, Standing Orders and Private Bills, and the Special Committee to Review the Freedom of Information and Protection of Privacy Act.

In addition to these committees, Belsey played a key role in the Government Caucus Committee on Economy and Government Operations, chaired the Land Use Planning Committee, and was an active participant in the Northern Caucus Committee and the Small Scale Salvage Review Committee. Earlier in his career, he also contributed to the Government Caucus Committee for Natural Resources and the Committee to Review the Results-Based Forest Practices Code.

Belsey lost his seat in the 2005 British Columbia general election but continued his involvement in politics, serving as vice-president of the BC Liberal Party in 2011. In 2012, he was implicated in a potential conflict of interest concerning his employer, Sun Wave Forest Products, and his correspondence with cabinet minister Pat Bell regarding regulatory matters.

== Personal life ==
Belsey married his wife, Lonie, in 1994, and together they have a blended family of four children and four grandchildren. In his free time, he enjoys gardening and fishing.

Belsey has been an active member of Rotary International, the Gizeh Temple, and the Skeena Clown Unit. His contributions to local sports include his involvement with Prince Rupert Minor Hockey, where he served as a referee, coach, vice-president, and president. He also served a term as president of the Skeena Valley Amateur Hockey Association.

== Electoral record ==
2001 British Columbia general election: North Coast
| Party | Candidate | Votes | % | ±% | Expenditures |
|---|---|---|---|---|---|
| Liberal | Bill Belsey | 4,915 | 45.25 | +19.50 | $51,617 |
| New Democratic | Colleen Fitzpatrick | 4,084 | 37.61 | −27.21 | $28,479 |
| Marijuana | Kenneth Leonard Peerless | 623 | 5.74 | – | $1,840 |
| Green | David Konsmo | 560 | 5.16 | +3.10 | $152 |
| All Nations | Emsily Victor Bolton | 526 | 4.84 | – | $8,371 |
| Unity | Clarence Hall | 152 | 1.40 | – | $730 |
| Total valid votes | | 10,860 | 100.00 | | |
| Total rejected ballots | | 46 | 0.42 | | |
| Turnout | | 10,906 | 66.27 | | |
| Liberal gain from New Democratic | | Swing | | +23.36 | |

2005 British Columbia general election: North Coast
| Party | Candidate | Votes | % | ±% | Expenditures |
|---|---|---|---|---|---|
| New Democratic | Gary Coons | 5,845 | 53.77 | +16.16 | $55,751 |
| Liberal | Bill Belsey | 4,185 | 38.50 | −6.75 | $138,287 |
| Green | Hondo Arendt | 629 | 5.79 | +0.63 | $780 |
| Marijuana | David Johns | 211 | 1.94 | −3.80 | $100 |
| Total valid votes | | 10,870 | 100.00 | | |
| Total rejected ballots | | 47 | 0.43 | | |
| Turnout | | 10,917 | 60.86 | | |
| New Democratic gain from Liberal | | Swing | | +11.46 | |
Source: Elections BC
