= North Coast-Haida Gwaii =

Provincial electoral district in British Columbia, Canada

British Columbia electoral district
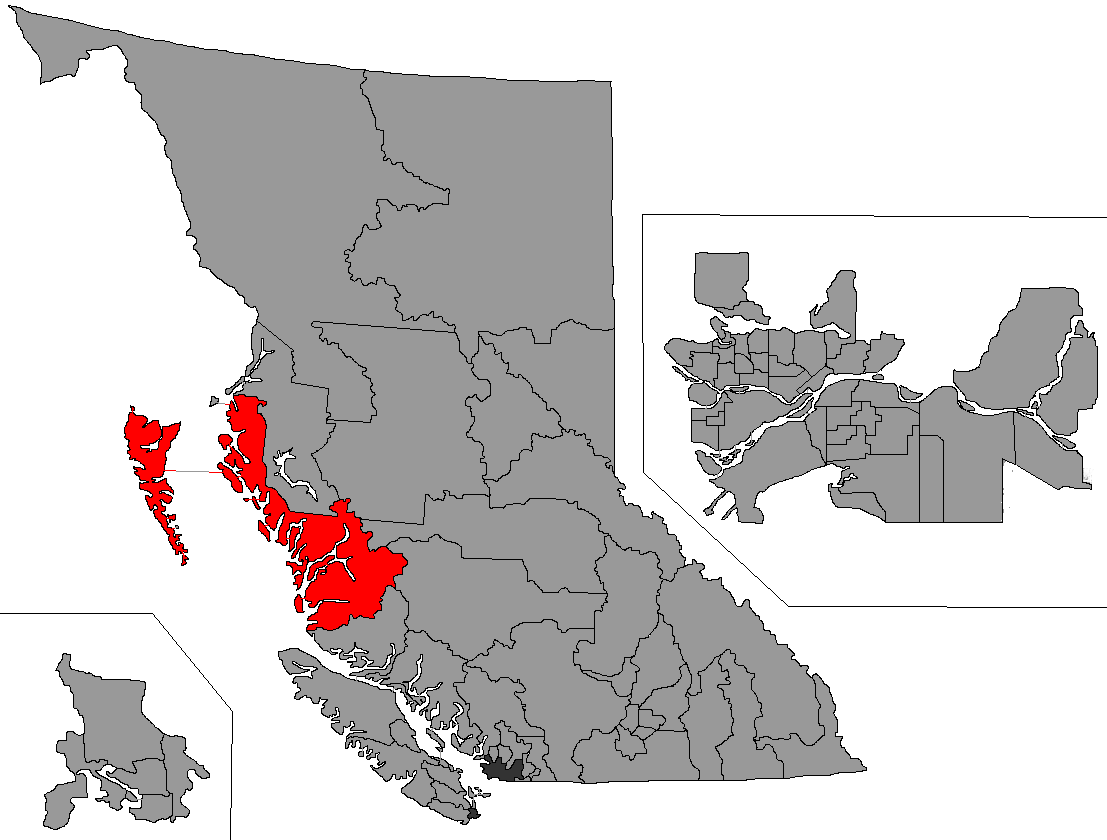

Provincial electoral district
- Legislature: Legislative Assembly of British Columbia
MLA
Tamara Davidson
New Democratic
- District created: 1990
- First contested: 1991
- Last contested: 2026

Demographics
- Population (2001): 27,992
- Area (km²): 65,972
- Pop. density (per km²): 0.42
- Census division(s): Central Coast, North Coast
- Census subdivision(s): Bella Bella, Bella Coola, Daajing Giids, Masset, Prince Rupert, Sandspit

North Coast-Haida Gwaii is a provincial electoral district for the Legislative Assembly of British Columbia, Canada.

It was created under the original name North Coast by 1990 legislation which came into effect for the 1991 election, largely out of the previous riding of Prince Rupert. Following the 2021 British Columbia electoral redistribution that took effect for the 2024 election, it adopted its present name but did not undergo any boundary changes.

== Geography ==
As of the 2024 provincial election, North Coast-Haida Gwaii comprises the entire area of the Skeena-Queen Charlotte and Central Coast Regional Districts and the southern portion of the Regional District of Kitimat-Stikine, located in the central and northern coast of British Columbia, Haida Gwaii and other islands. Communities in the electoral district consist of Prince Rupert, Bella Coola, Bella Bella, Daajing Giids (formerly Queen Charlotte), Masset, Port Edward, Klemtu and Port Clements.

== Members of the Legislative Assembly ==
Its member of the Legislative Assembly (MLA) is Tamara Davidson. She was first elected during the 2024 British Columbia general election.

Assembly	Years	Member	Party
North Coast; Riding created from Atlin, Mackenzie, Prince Rupert and Skeena
35th	1991–1996	Dan Miller	New Democratic
36th	1996–2001	Dan Miller	New Democratic
37th	2001–2005	Bill Belsey	Liberal
38th	2005–2009	Gary Coons	New Democratic
39th	2009–2013	Gary Coons	New Democratic
40th	2013–2017	Jennifer Rice	New Democratic
41st	2017–2020	Jennifer Rice	New Democratic
42nd	2020–2024	Jennifer Rice	New Democratic
North Coast-Haida Gwaii
43rd	2024–2026	Tamara Davidson	New Democratic
44th	2026–present	Tamara Davidson	New Democratic

== Election results ==
2026 British Columbia general election
** Preliminary results — Not yet official **
Party	Candidate	Votes	%	±%
New Democratic	Tamara Davidson	4,051	61.44	-3.47
Conservative	Rodney Proskiw	1,901	28.83	-6.25
Green	Francis Racy	641	9.72	
Total valid votes		6,593	99.58	
Total rejected ballots		28	0.42	-0.25
Turnout		6,621		
Registered voters				
Source: Elections BC
New Democratic hold		Swing		+1.39

2024 British Columbia general election
Party	Candidate	Votes	%	±%	Expenditures
New Democratic	Tamara Davidson	4,863	64.92	-7.90	$29,415.53
Conservative	Chris Sankey	2,628	35.08	–	$36,095.33
Total valid votes/expense limit		7,491	99.32	–	$71,700.08
Total rejected ballots		51	0.68	–	
Turnout		7,542	48.60	+8.15	
Registered voters		15,518			
New Democratic hold		Swing		-21.49	
Source: Elections BC

2020 British Columbia general election: North Coast
Party	Candidate	Votes	%	±%	Expenditures
New Democratic	Jennifer Rice	4,544	72.82	+15.52	$20,456.05
Liberal	Roy Jones Jr.	1,429	22.90	−10.78	$10,919.11
Libertarian	Jody Craven	267	4.28	–	$0.00
Total valid votes		6,240	98.35	–	
Total rejected ballots		105	1.65	+0.48	
Turnout		6,345	40.45	-20.71	
Registered voters		15,686			
New Democratic hold		Swing		+13.15	
Source: Elections BC

2017 British Columbia general election: North Coast
Party	Candidate	Votes	%	±%	Expenditures
New Democratic	Jennifer Rice	5,242	57.30	+0.58	$32,367
Liberal	Herb Pond	3,081	33.67	+0.6	$60,058
Green	Hondo Arendt	826	9.03	−1.18	$945
Total valid votes		9,149	100.00		
Total rejected ballots		44	0.48		
Turnout		9,193	61.16		
Registered voters		15,030			
Source: Elections BC

2013 British Columbia general election: North Coast
Party	Candidate	Votes	%	±%	Expenditures
New Democratic	Jennifer Rice	4,617	56.72	−0.61	$67,356
Liberal	Judy Fraser	2,692	33.07	−1.91	$46,272
Green	Hondo Arendt	831	10.21	+2.52	$346
Total valid votes		8,140	100.0		
Total rejected ballots		51	0.62		
Turnout		8,191	52.85		
New Democratic hold		Swing		+0.65	
Source: Elections BC

2011 British Columbia sales tax referendum
Side	Votes	%
Yes	4,131	67.18
No	2,018	32.82

2009 British Columbia general election: North Coast
Party	Candidate	Votes	%	±%	Expenditures
New Democratic	Gary Coons	5,097	57.33	+3.56	$63,441
Liberal	Herb Pond	3,110	34.98	−3.52	$97,880
Green	Lisa Girbav	683	7.69	+1.90	$1,616
Total valid votes		8,890	100.0		
Total rejected ballots		70	0.78		
Turnout		8,960	57.14		
New Democratic hold		Swing		+3.54	

2009 British Columbia electoral reform referendum
Side	Votes	%
FPTP	5,231	60.66
BC-STV	3,393	39.34

2005 British Columbia general election: North Coast
Party	Candidate	Votes	%	±%	Expenditures
New Democratic	Gary Coons	5,845	53.77	+16.16	$55,751
Liberal	Bill Belsey	4,185	38.50	−6.75	$138,287
Green	Hondo Arendt	629	5.79	+0.63	$780
Marijuana	David Johns	211	1.94	−3.80	$100
Total valid votes		10,870	100.00		
Total rejected ballots		47	0.43		
Turnout		10,917	60.86		
New Democratic gain from Liberal		Swing		+11.46	
Source: Elections BC

2005 British Columbia electoral reform referendum
Side	Votes	%
Yes	5,444	52.93
No	4,842	47.07

2001 British Columbia general election: North Coast
Party	Candidate	Votes	%	±%	Expenditures
Liberal	Bill Belsey	4,915	45.25	+19.50	$51,617
New Democratic	Colleen Fitzpatrick	4,084	37.61	−27.21	$28,479
Marijuana	Kenneth Leonard Peerless	623	5.74	–	$1,840
Green	David Konsmo	560	5.16	+3.10	$152
All Nations	Emsily Victor Bolton	526	4.84	–	$8,371
Unity	Clarence Hall	152	1.40	–	$730
Total valid votes		10,860	100.00		
Total rejected ballots		46	0.42		
Turnout		10,906	66.27		
Liberal gain from New Democratic		Swing		+23.36	

1996 British Columbia general election: North Coast
Party	Candidate	Votes	%	±%	Expenditures
New Democratic	Dan Miller	7,298	64.82	+5.07	$29,582
Liberal	Odd Eidsvik	2,899	25.75	+2.57	$26,079
Reform	Clarence Hall	830	7.37	–	$1,912
Green	Patrick Lemaire	232	2.06	–	$406
Total valid votes		11,259	100.0		
Total rejected ballots		84	0.74		
Turnout		11,343	63.33		
New Democratic hold		Swing		+1.25	

1991 British Columbia general election: North Coast
Party	Candidate	Votes	%	Expenditures
New Democratic	Dan Miller	6,365	59.75	$29,619
Liberal	Rocky L. Sorensen	2,469	23.18	$5,724
Social Credit	Linda D. Marshall-Lutz	1,818	17.07	$20,100
Total valid votes		10,652	100.0	
Total rejected ballots		312	2.85	
Turnout		10,964	68.37	

== See also ==
- List of British Columbia provincial electoral districts
- Canadian provincial electoral districts

Legislative Assembly of British Columbia
Preceded by Vancouver-Kingsway	Constituency represented by the premier 1999–2000	Succeeded by Vancouver-Kensington
