= Arnie Hamilton =

Canadian politician (born 1948)

MLA for Esquimalt-Metchosin
- In office 2001–2005
- Preceded by: Moe Sihota
- Succeeded by: Maurine Karagianis

Personal details
- Born: 1948 (age 77–78) North Bay, Ontario
- Party: BC Liberal
- Occupation: businessman, police officer

Arnie Hamilton (born 1948) is a former Canadian politician who served as a BC Liberal member of the Legislative Assembly of British Columbia from 2001 to 2005, representing the riding of Esquimalt-Metchosin.

== Electoral results ==
2001 British Columbia general election: Esquimalt-Metchosin
Party	Candidate	Votes	%	Expenditures
Liberal	Arnie Hamilton	9,544	45.79	$41,647
New Democratic	Maurine Karagianis	6,258	30.03	$19,636
Green	Marilyn Sundeen	3,685	17.68	$3,878
Marijuana	Christopher John Davies	534	2.56	–
Conservative	Bill Clarke	322	1.55	$941
Unity	Bob Ward	268	1.29	$367
Independent	Rick Berglund	105	0.50	$117
Independent	Scott Attrill	68	0.33	$100
Independent	Gerry McVeigh	57	0.27	$116
Total valid votes		20,841	100.00	
Total rejected ballots		86	0.41	
Turnout		20,927	69.49	
Source: Elections BC
