= Victoria-Beacon Hill =

Provincial electoral district in British Columbia, Canada

British Columbia electoral district

Provincial electoral district
- Legislature: Legislative Assembly of British Columbia
MLA
Grace Lore
New Democratic
- First contested: 1991
- Last contested: 2026

Demographics
- Population (2021): 54,375
- Area (km²): 83
- Pop. density (per km²): 655.1
- Census division: Capital Regional District
- Census subdivision: Victoria (part)

Victoria-Beacon Hill is a provincial electoral district for the Legislative Assembly of British Columbia.

== Demographics ==
Population, 2021	54,375
Area (km^{2})	83
Pop. density (people per km^{2})	655
Source: BC Electoral Boundaries Commission

== Geography ==
The riding comprises most of the city of Victoria, the provincial capital. It is bounded by the coastline to the south and west including the downtown core; by the Municipality of Oak Bay to the east, by Bay Street and Haultain Street to the north.

== History ==
Victoria-Beacon Hill was created in 1989, in time for the 1991 British Columbia general election, after the abolition of the two-member district of Victoria along with all other such dual ridings. In the 2008 boundary redistribution, Victoria-Beacon Hill kept 89 per cent of its area and added nine per cent of Victoria-Hillside.

== Members of the Legislative Assembly ==
This riding has elected the following members of the Legislative Assembly:

Assembly	Years	Member	Party
Victoria-Beacon Hill; Riding created from Victoria
35th	1991–1996	Gretchen Brewin	New Democratic
36th	1996–2001	Gretchen Brewin	New Democratic
37th	2001–2005	Jeff Bray	Liberal
38th	2005–2009	Carole James	New Democratic
39th	2009–2013	Carole James	New Democratic
40th	2013–2017	Carole James	New Democratic
41st	2017–2020	Carole James	New Democratic
42nd	2020–2024	Grace Lore	New Democratic
43rd	2024–2026	Grace Lore	New Democratic
44th	2026–present	Grace Lore	New Democratic

== Election results ==
2026 British Columbia general election
** Preliminary results — Not yet official **
Party	Candidate	Votes	%	±%
New Democratic	Grace Lore	10,407	45.67	-1.69
Green	Rajinder S. Sahota	9,189	40.32	+6.83
Conservative	Joachim Agou (Note: Removed by the party after the candidate deadline, but will remain on the ballot.)	3,193	14.01	-5.14
Total valid votes		22,789	99.57	
Total rejected ballots		99	0.43	+0.25
Turnout		22,888		
Registered voters				
New Democratic hold		Swing		-4.26
Source: Elections BC

2024 British Columbia general election
Party	Candidate	Votes	%	±%	Expenditures
New Democratic	Grace Lore	13,350	47.34	-7.4	
Green	Sonia Furstenau	9,441	33.48	+3.3	
Conservative	Tim Thielmann	5,410	19.18	–	
Total valid votes		28,201	–		
Total rejected ballots					
Turnout					
Registered voters					
New Democratic notional hold		Swing		-5.4	
Source: Elections BC

2020 provincial election redistributed results
Party	%
New Democratic	54.7
Green	30.2
Liberal	13.9

2020 British Columbia general election
Party	Candidate	Votes	%	±%	Expenditures
New Democratic	Grace Lore	16,474	54.61	+1.56	$33,454.50
Green	Jenn Neilson	9,031	29.93	−0.45	$29,344.41
Liberal	Karen Bill	4,329	14.35	−1.14	$2,251.45
Independent	Jordan Reichert	335	1.11	+0.65	$0.00
Total valid votes		30,169	100.00	–	
Total rejected ballots		244	0.80	+0.42	
Turnout		30,413	61.46	–2.74	
Registered voters		49,484			
New Democratic hold		Swing		+1.01	
Source: Elections BC

2017 British Columbia general election
Party	Candidate	Votes	%	±%	Expenditures
New Democratic	Carole James	16,057	53.05	+4.40	$2,272
Green	Kalen Harris	9,194	30.38	−3.50	$14,825
Liberal	Karen Bill	4,689	15.49	−1.47	$30,914
Libertarian	Art Lowe	190	0.63	–	$225
Independent	Jordan Reichert	102	0.34	–	$190
Independent	David Shebib	35	0.11	–	$50
Total valid votes		30,267	100.00	–	
Total rejected ballots		115	0.38	−0.11	
Turnout		30,382	64.20	+5.53	
Registered voters		47,321			
Source: Elections BC

2013 British Columbia general election
Party	Candidate	Votes	%
New Democratic	Carole James	12,697	48.82
Green	Jane Sterk	8,796	33.82
Liberal	Karen Bill	4,386	16.86
Communist	John Shaw	131	0.50
Total valid votes		26,010	100.00
Total rejected ballots		128	0.49
Turnout		26,138	58.67
Source: Elections BC

2009 British Columbia general election
Party	Candidate	Votes	%	±%
New Democratic	Carole James	13,400	55.37	−1.84
Liberal	Dallas Henault	6,375	26.34	−4.39
Green	Adam SaAB	4,106	16.97	+6.40
Independent	Saul Andersen	319	1.32	+1.32
Total valid votes		24,200		

2005 British Columbia general election
Party	Candidate	Votes	%	±%
New Democratic	Carole James	15,064	57.21	+20.31
Liberal	Jeff Bray	8,091	30.73	−6.31
Green	John William Miller	2,783	10.57	−11.15
Democratic Reform	David McCaig	157	0.60	+0.60
Independent	Benjamin McConchie	121	0.46	+0.46
Independent	Ingmar Lee	116	0.44	+0.44
Total		26,332	100.00	

2001 British Columbia general election
Party	Candidate	Votes	%	Expenditures
Liberal	Jeff Bray	9,297	37.04	$52,485
New Democratic	Carole James	9,262	36.90	$44,963
Green	Walter Meyer zu Erpen	5,453	21.72	$8,210
Marijuana	Troy Tompkins	532	2.12	$70
Unity	Gregory Paul Michael Hartnell	290	1.15	$3,817
Independent	Rob Botterell	205	0.82	$911
Communist	Kirsten Goodacre	64	0.25	$427
Total valid votes		25,103	100.00	
Total rejected ballots		153	0.53	
Turnout		25,238	68.63	

1996 British Columbia general election
Party	Candidate	Votes	%	Expenditures
New Democratic	Gretchen Brewin	11,960	52.51	$39,468
Liberal	Howard Markson	7,636	33.52	$25,991
Progressive Democrat	Richard Fahl	1,093	4.80	$1,555
Green	Stephen DeMeulenaere	1,008	4.43	$1,750
Reform	Ken Conrad	654	2.87	$6,135
Social Credit	Lance van Dyk	96	0.42	$3,796
Libertarian	Jill Kolbinson	92	0.40	$130
Independent	Sequoia Nathan Maxwell	73	0.32	$124
Natural Law	Cal Danyluk	64	0.28	$118
Western Canada Concept	Bob Ward	59	0.26	$227
Common Sense	Johnny Douglas	43	0.19	$100
Total valid votes		22,778	100.00	
Total rejected ballots		194	0.84	
Turnout		22,972	68.17	

1991 British Columbia general election
Party	Candidate	Votes	%	Expenditures
New Democratic	Gretchen Brewin	10,939	47.95	$48,796
Liberal	Karen Bill	7,434	32.59	$4,696
Social Credit	Suzanne Hansen	3,712	16.27	$46,834
Green	Michael Timney	728	3.19	$1,300
Total valid votes		22,813	100.00	
Total rejected ballots		629	2.68	
Turnout		23,442	74.06	

== See also ==
- List of British Columbia provincial electoral districts
- Canadian provincial electoral districts
