= Maurine Karagianis =

Canadian politician

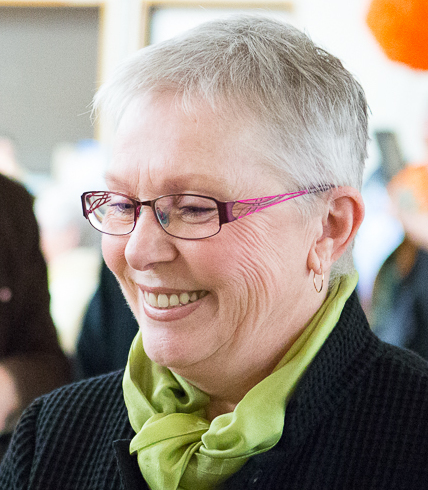

Member of the British Columbia Legislative Assembly for Esquimalt-Royal Roads Esquimalt-Metchosin (2005-2009)
- In office May 17, 2005 – May 9, 2017
- Preceded by: Arnie Hamilton
- Succeeded by: Mitzi Dean

Personal details
- Born: 1949 or 1950 (age 75–76)
- Party: New Democrat
- Occupation: businessperson, municipal councillor

Maurine Edna Karagianis (born 1949 or 1950) is a Canadian politician who formerly served as a member of the Legislative Assembly of British Columbia (MLA). A member of the British Columbia New Democratic Party (BC NDP), she represented the riding of Esquimalt-Metchosin from 2005 to 2009, and Esquimalt-Royal Roads from 2009 to 2017.

== Biography ==
Prior to entering politics, Karagianis was an entrepreneur who opened her own retail fashion store, and operated a wholesale venture and an import/export business. She was also a co-founder of the Sunshine Folkfest in Powell River, British Columbia.

She was elected as a municipal councillor in Esquimalt in 1996, and was re-elected in 1999 and 2002. During her time on council, she helped launch the Capital Regional District's Arts Committee, serving as chair until 2005. She also served three years with the provincial government as assistant to three NDP cabinet ministers beginning in 1998 – first in the Social Services ministry and then in Transportation and Highways.

With the incumbent NDP Esquimalt-Metchosin MLA Moe Sihota declining to run again in the 2001 provincial election, Karagianis was named as the party's candidate in the riding, but lost to Liberal candidate Arnie Hamilton. After the election loss, she ran a consulting company from 2001 to 2005, working with non-profit organizations and First Nations to create seniors housing in BC.

She contested the constituency of Esquimalt-Metchosin again in the 2005 election, this time garnering almost 50 percent of votes cast and 2,895 more votes than the next closest candidate to be elected the riding's MLA. In the 38th Parliament, she served as the official opposition critic for Small Business and Revenue, Children and Family Development, and Transportation in NDP leader Carole James' shadow cabinet.

She was re-elected in 2009 to the new constituency of Esquimalt-Royal Roads, and was again appointed as the critic for Children and Family Development. She was elected as Official Opposition Caucus Whip in January 2011, and served in that position until her retirement. She also replaced Gary Coons as critic for BC Ferries and Coastal Communities in February 2013.

Following her re-election in 2013, she served as critic for shipbuilding, women's issues, and child care and early learning in the 40th Parliament. She endorsed John Horgan in the 2014 NDP leadership election, and was named critic for women, seniors, and early childhood development after Horgan's acclamation as NDP leader.

She announced in August 2016 that she would not run again in the next provincial election. After finishing her final term as MLA in 2017, she was appointed Chair of the Board of Directors of the Knowledge Network in July 2018, and retired from that role in 2022.

== Electoral results ==
2013 British Columbia general election: Esquimalt-Royal Roads
Party	Candidate	Votes	%
New Democratic	Maurine Karagianis	10963	48.20
Liberal	Chris Ricketts	6511	28.63
Green	Susan Christina Low	4928	21.67
Independent	Joshua Steffler	343	1.51
Total valid votes		22745	100.00
Total rejected ballots		113	0.49
Turnout		22858	58.23
Source: Elections BC

2009 British Columbia general election: Esquimalt-Royal Roads
Party	Candidate	Votes	%	±%
New Democratic	Maurine Karagianis	11,514	52.92	+3.29
Liberal	Carl Ratsoy	6,579	30.24	-7.94
Green	Jane Sterk	3,664	16.84	+6.27
Total valid votes		21,757	100.00	
Total rejected ballots		122	0.56	
Turnout		21,879	58.27	
Source: Elections BC

2005 British Columbia general election: Esquimalt-Metchosin
Party	Candidate	Votes	%	±%
New Democratic	Maurine Karagianis	12,545	49.63	+19.60
Liberal	Tom Woods	9,650	38.18	-7.61
Green	Jane Sterk	2,672	10.57	-7.11
Democratic Reform	Graeme Rodger	409	1.62	–
Total valid votes		25,276	100.00	
Total rejected ballots		140	0.55	
Turnout		25,416	66.89	
Source: Elections BC

2001 British Columbia general election: Esquimalt-Metchosin
Party	Candidate	Votes	%	Expenditures
Liberal	Arnie Hamilton	9,544	45.79	$41,647
New Democratic	Maurine Karagianis	6,258	30.03	$19,636
Green	Marilyn Sundeen	3,685	17.68	$3,878
Marijuana	Christopher John Davies	534	2.56	–
Conservative	Bill Clarke	322	1.55	$941
Unity	Bob Ward	268	1.29	$367
Independent	Rick Berglund	105	0.50	$117
Independent	Scott Attrill	68	0.33	$100
Independent	Gerry McVeigh	57	0.27	$116
Total valid votes		20,841	100.00	
Total rejected ballots		86	0.41	
Turnout		20,927	69.49	
Source: Elections BC
