= Port Coquitlam (provincial electoral district) =

Provincial electoral district in British Columbia, Canada

British Columbia electoral district
- Interactive map of electoral district boundaries

Provincial electoral district
- Legislature: Legislative Assembly of British Columbia
MLA
Mike Farnworth
New Democratic
- First contested: 1991
- Last contested: 2026

Demographics
- Population (2021): 61,483
- Area (km²): 34.64
- Pop. density (per km²): 1,774.9
- Census division: Metro Vancouver
- Census subdivision: Port Coquitlam

Port Coquitlam is a provincial electoral district in British Columbia, represented in the Legislative Assembly of British Columbia from 1991 to 2001 and since 2009.

== Demographics ==
Population, 2021	61,483
Area (km^{2})	34
Population density (people per km^{2})	1,808
Source: BC Electoral Boundaries Commission

== Geography ==
Located in Port Coquitlam, the district follows the city's municipal boundaries to the north and west, excluding the Kwikwetlem First Nation reserve. It is bordered by the Fraser River to the south and the Pitt River to the east.

== Members of the Legislative Assembly ==
This riding has elected the following members of the Legislative Assembly:

Assembly	Years	Member	Party
Port Coquitlam; Riding created from Coquitlam-Moody
35th	1991–1996	Mike Farnworth	New Democratic
36th	1996–2001	Mike Farnworth	New Democratic
Riding dissolved into Burquitlam, Port Coquitlam-Burke Mountain and Port Moody-Westwood
Riding re-created from Port Coquitlam-Burke Mountain and Port Moody-Westwood
39th	2009–2013	Mike Farnworth	New Democratic
40th	2013–2017	Mike Farnworth	New Democratic
41st	2017–2020	Mike Farnworth	New Democratic
42nd	2020–2024	Mike Farnworth	New Democratic
43rd	2024–2026	Mike Farnworth	New Democratic
44th	2026–present	Mike Farnworth	New Democratic

== Election results ==
2026 British Columbia general election
Party	Candidate	Votes	%	±%	Expenditures
New Democratic	Mike Farnworth	9,760	45.3	-8.5	
Conservative	Keenan Adams	9,374	43.5	+4.8	
Green	Stephanie Hendy	1,833	8.5	+2.1	
Unaffiliated	Lee-Ann Bates	285	1.3	-	
Libertarian	Lewis C. Dahlby	274	1.3	-	
Total valid votes		21,526			
Total rejected ballots					
Turnout					
Registered voters					
New Democratic hold		Swing			
Source: Elections BC

2024 British Columbia general election
Party	Candidate	Votes	%	±%	Expenditures
New Democratic	Mike Farnworth	13,843	53.87	−10.27	$19,589.22
Conservative	Keenan Adams	9,967	38.79	–	$12,191.99
Green	Adam Bremner-Akins	1,644	6.40	−6.22	$1,973.77
Libertarian	Lewis Dahlby	244	0.95	−1.40	$512.50
Total valid votes/expense limit		25,698	99.85	–	$71,700.08
Total rejected ballots		38	0.15	–	
Turnout		25,736	57.70	+3.34	
Registered voters		44,601			
New Democratic hold		Swing		−24.53	
Source: Elections BC

2020 British Columbia general election
Party	Candidate	Votes	%	±%	Expenditures
New Democratic	Mike Farnworth	15,370	64.14	+8.35	$9,774.62
Liberal	Mehran Zargham	5,009	20.90	−9.15	$4,583.11
Green	Erik Minty	3,023	12.61	−0.22	$2,051.19
Libertarian	Lewis Clarke Dahlby	563	2.35	+1.37	$0.00
Total valid votes		23,965	100.00	–	
Total rejected ballots		146	0.61	+0.09	
Turnout		24,111	54.36	–8.08	
Registered voters		44,358			
New Democratic hold		Swing		+4.69	
Source: Elections BC

2017 British Columbia general election
Party	Candidate	Votes	%	±%	Expenditures
New Democratic	Mike Farnworth	14,079	55.79	+2.85	$52,164
Liberal	Susan Chambers	7,582	30.05	−6.52	$26,734
Green	Jason Hanley	3,237	12.83	–	$1,177
Libertarian	Lewis Clarke Dahlby	248	0.98	−0.63	$89
Cascadia	Billy Gibbons	88	0.35	–	$1,973
Total valid votes		25,234	100.00	–	
Total rejected ballots		131	0.52	−0.20	
Turnout		25,365	62.44	+5.18	
Registered voters		40,621			
Source: Elections BC

2013 British Columbia general election
Party	Candidate	Votes	%	±%	Expenditures
New Democratic	Mike Farnworth	11,755	52.94	−1.77	$86,221
Liberal	Barbara Lu	8,120	36.57	−2.28	$23,507
Conservative	Ryan Hague	1,525	6.87	–	$3,928
Your Political Party	Brent Williams	447	2.01	+1.34	$610
Libertarian	Jogender Dahiya	358	1.61	+0.73	$872
Total valid votes		22,205	100.00	–	
Total rejected ballots		160	0.72	+0.20	
Turnout		22,365	57.26	+2.05	
Registered voters		39,059			
Source: Elections BC

2009 British Columbia general election
Party	Candidate	Votes	%	±	Expenditures
New Democratic	Mike Farnworth	11,121	54.71%		$63,090
Liberal	Bernie Hiller	7,896	38.85%		$68,768
Green	Cole Bertsch	994	4.89%	–	$350
Libertarian	Lewis Dahlby	178	0.88%		$250
Your Political Party	Brent Williams	137	0.67%		$775
Total Valid Votes		20,326	100%		
Total Rejected Ballots		106	0.52%		
Turnout		20,432	55.21%		

Superseded by Port Coquitlam-Burke Mountain from 2001–2009

1996 British Columbia general election: Port Coquitlam
Party	Candidate	Votes	%	±	Expenditures
NDP	Mike Farnworth	14,767	46.37%		$45,109
Liberal	Irene Barr	13,310	41.80%		$52,332
Progressive Democrat	Rick Howard	1,789	5.62%	–	$1,058
Reform	Lawrence Glazer	1,335	4.19%		$2,965
Green	Debra Eilers	417	1.31%	–	$100
Libertarian	Michael Wiebe	102	0.32%		
Social Credit	Stan Mortensen	124	0.39%	–	$1,582
Total valid votes		31,844	100.00%		
Total rejected ballots		152	0.48%		
Turnout		31,996	73.48%		

1991 British Columbia general election: Port Coquitlam
Party	Candidate	Votes	%	±	Expenditures
NDP	Mike Farnworth	11,435	45.47%		$22,300
Liberal	Ernest R. Jilg	9,929	39.49%		$2,384
Social Credit	Jim Allard	3,781	15.04%	–	$49,126
Total valid votes		25,145	100.00%		
Total rejected ballots		532	2.07%		
Turnout		25,677	76.45%		

== See also ==
- List of British Columbia provincial electoral districts
- Canadian provincial electoral districts
