= Darlene Rotchford =

Canadian politician

Darlene Rotchford MLA
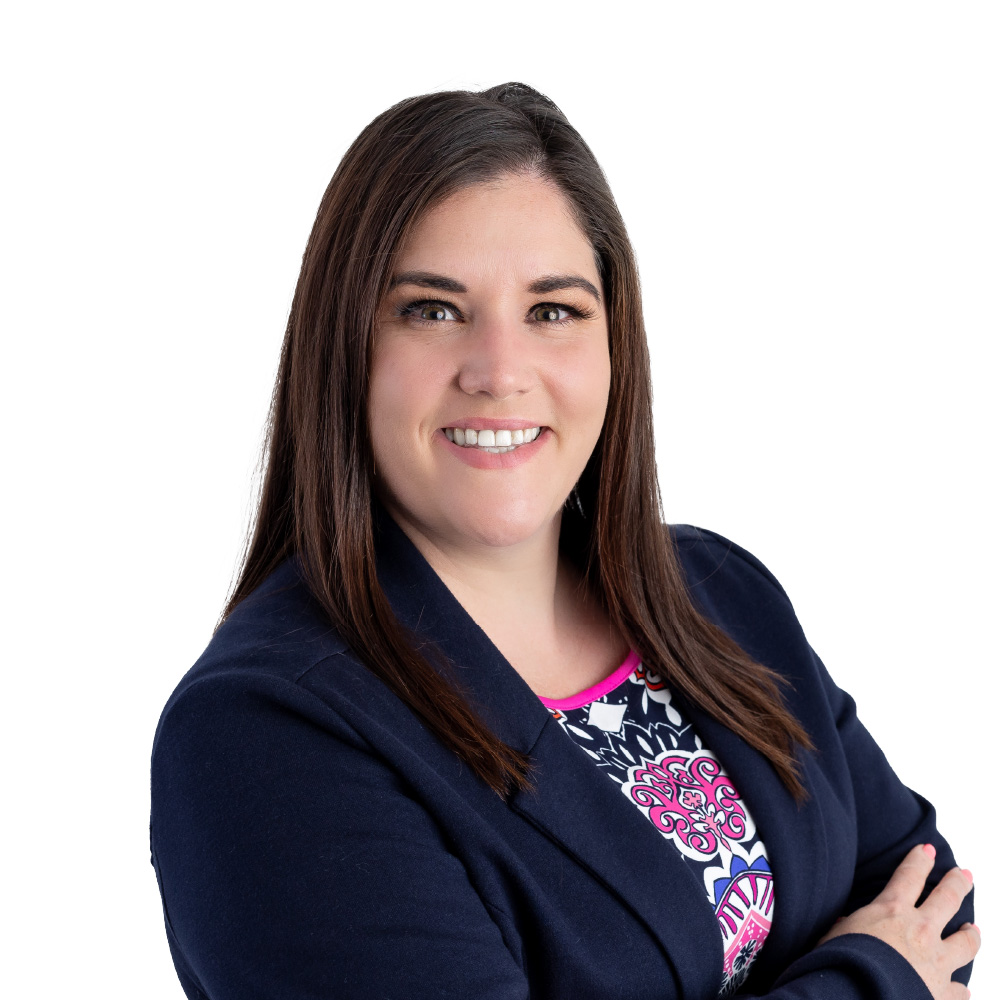
- Campaign portrait, 2024

Parliamentary Secretary for Labour of British Columbia
- Incumbent
- Assumed office November 18, 2024
- Premier: David Eby
- Preceded by: Janet Routledge

Member of the British Columbia Legislative Assembly for Esquimalt-Colwood
- Incumbent
- Assumed office October 19, 2024
- Preceded by: Constituency established

Personal details
- Party: BC NDP

Darlene Rotchford MLA is a Canadian politician who has served as a member of the Legislative Assembly of British Columbia (MLA) representing the electoral district of Esquimalt-Colwood since 2024. She is a member of the New Democratic Party.

Rotchford is a former municipal councillor in Esquimalt, a mental health and addictions worker, and a labour leader. She resigned from her councillor position after her election to the provincial legislature.

In May 2025, a private member's bill put forward by Rotchford prohibiting MLAs from simultaneously holding municipal offices such as councillors and school board trusteeships was passed with support from both the NDP and the Green Party of British Columbia.

In 2026, Rotchford endorsed Rob Ashton in that year's federal NDP leadership race.

== Electoral history ==
2026 British Columbia general election: Esquimalt-Colwood
The 2026 general election will be held on October 24.
Party	Candidate	Votes	%	±%	Expenditures
New Democratic	Darlene Rotchford				
Conservative	Dave Johnston				
Green	Sid Tobias				
CentreBC	Sidney Coles				
Total valid votes					
Total rejected ballots					
Turnout					
Registered voters					
Source: Elections BC

2024 British Columbia general election: Esquimalt-Colwood
Party	Candidate	Votes	%	±%	Expenditures
New Democratic	Darlene Rotchford	15,238	51.47	-7.9	$47,134.81
Conservative	John Wilson	8,652	29.22	–	$43,079.99
Green	Camille Currie	5,716	19.31	-4.5	$34,130.70
Total valid votes/expense limit		29,606	99.88	–	$71,700.08
Total rejected ballots		37	0.12	–	
Turnout		29,643	63.34	–	
Registered voters		46,799			
New Democratic notional hold		Swing		-18.6	
Source: Elections BC

== See also ==
- 43rd Parliament of British Columbia
