= Esquimalt-Metchosin =

Provincial electoral district in British Columbia, Canada

British Columbia electoral district

Defunct provincial electoral district
- Legislature: Legislative Assembly of British Columbia
- First contested: 1991
- Last contested: 2020

Demographics
- Population (2014): 51,450
- Area (km²): 378
- Census division: Greater Victoria
- Census subdivision(s): Esquimalt, View Royal, Colwood, and Metchosin

Esquimalt-Metchosin is a former provincial electoral district for the Legislative Assembly of British Columbia, Canada. It existed with this name from 1991 to 2009, and again from 2017 to 2024. In the gap, the overlapping electoral district was called Esquimalt-Royal Roads. The "Royal Roads" in the district's name references the maritime passage that connects the Harbour to the sea and is the namesake of Royal Roads Military College.

The riding was reconfigured and brought back in the 2015 electoral redistribution and was contested again in the 2017 election. The 2021 redistribution that took effect for the 2024 election significantly altered electoral boundaries in the western communities: Metchosin was transferred to the new district of Juan de Fuca-Malahat while the balance of the district's territory was joined to Victoria West to form Esquimalt-Colwood.

== Demographics ==
| Population, 2014 | 51,450 |
| Area (km^{2}) | 378 |

== Geography ==
The Esquimalt-Metchosin electoral district is made up of the municipalities of Esquimalt, View Royal, Colwood, and Metchosin in western Greater Victoria.

Esquimalt-Royal Roads included communities that surround Esquimalt Harbour, including Esquimalt to the east and Colwood to the west.

== History ==
Esquimalt-Metchosin
| Assembly | Years | Member | Party |
|---|---|---|---|
Esquimalt-Metchosin; Riding created from Esquimalt-Port Renfrew
| 35th | 1991–1996 | Moe Sihota | New Democratic |
| 36th | 1996–2001 | Moe Sihota | New Democratic |
| 37th | 2001–2005 | Arnie Hamilton | Liberal |
| 38th | 2005–2009 | Maurine Karagianis | New Democratic |
Esquimalt-Royal Roads
| 39th | 2009–2013 | Maurine Karagianis | New Democratic |
| 40th | 2013–2017 | Maurine Karagianis | New Democratic |
Esquimalt-Metchosin
| 41st | 2017–2020 | Mitzi Dean | New Democratic |
| 42nd | 2020–2024 | Mitzi Dean | New Democratic |

== Member of the Legislative Assembly ==
Its current MLA is Mitzi Dean, the former executive director for Pacific Centre Family Services. She was first elected in 2017. She represents the British Columbia New Democratic Party.

== Election results ==
2020 British Columbia general election
| Party | Candidate | Votes | % | ±% | Expenditures |
|---|---|---|---|---|---|
| New Democratic | Mitzi Dean | 15,070 | 59.32 | +13.07 | $36,746.64 |
| Green | Andy MacKinnon | 6,140 | 24.17 | −0.64 | $9,644.51 |
| Liberal | RJ Senko | 3,940 | 15.51 | −12.11 | $16,844.69 |
| Independent | Desta McPherson | 254 | 1.00 | – | $1,062.36 |
| Total valid votes | | 25,404 | 100.00 | – | |
| Total rejected ballots | | | | | |
| Turnout | | | | | |
| Registered voters | | | | | |
Source: Elections BC

2017 British Columbia general election
| Party | Candidate | Votes | % | Expenditures |
|---|---|---|---|---|
| New Democratic | Mitzi Dean | 11,816 | 46.25 | $65,033 |
| Liberal | Barb Desjardins | 7,055 | 27.62 | $52,675 |
| Green | Andy MacKinnon | 6,339 | 24.81 | 10,290 |
| Libertarian | Josh Steffler | 171 | 0.67 | $200 |
| Independent | Delmar Martay | 102 | 0.40 | $475 |
| Communist | Tyson Riel Strandlund | 65 | 0.25 | $0 |
| Total valid votes | | 25,548 | 100.00 | |
| Total rejected ballots | | 84 | 0.33 | |
| Turnout | | 25,632 | 65.88 | |
| Registered voters | | 38,909 | | |
Source: Elections BC

2013 British Columbia general election: Esquimalt-Royal Roads
| Party | Candidate | Votes | % |
|---|---|---|---|
| New Democratic | Maurine Karagianis | 10,963 | 48.20 |
| Liberal | Chris Ricketts | 6,511 | 28.63 |
| Green | Susan Christina Low | 4,928 | 21.67 |
| Independent | Joshua Steffler | 343 | 1.51 |

2009 British Columbia general election: Esquimalt-Royal Roads
| Party | Candidate | Votes | % | ±% |
|---|---|---|---|---|
| New Democratic | Maurine Karagianis | 11,514 | 52.92 | +3.29 |
| Liberal | Carl Ratsoy | 6,579 | 30.24 | -7.94 |
| Green | Jane Sterk | 3,664 | 16.84 | +6.27 |
| Total valid votes | | 21,757 | 100.00 | |
| Total rejected ballots | | 122 | 0.56 | |
| Turnout | | 21,879 | 58.27 | |
Source: Elections BC

2005 British Columbia general election
| Party | Candidate | Votes | % | ±% |
|---|---|---|---|---|
| New Democratic | Maurine Karagianis | 12,545 | 49.63 | +19.60 |
| Liberal | Tom Woods | 9,650 | 38.18 | -7.61 |
| Green | Jane Sterk | 2,672 | 10.57 | -7.11 |
| Democratic Reform | Graeme Rodger | 409 | 1.62 | – |
| Total valid votes | | 25,276 | 100.00 | |
| Total rejected ballots | | 140 | 0.55 | |
| Turnout | | 25,416 | 66.89 | |
Source: Elections BC

2001 British Columbia general election
| Party | Candidate | Votes | % | Expenditures |
|---|---|---|---|---|
| Liberal | Arnie Hamilton | 9,544 | 45.79 | $41,647 |
| New Democratic | Maurine Karagianis | 6,258 | 30.03 | $19,636 |
| Green | Marilyn Sundeen | 3,685 | 17.68 | $3,878 |
| Marijuana | Christopher John Davies | 534 | 2.56 | – |
| Conservative | Bill Clarke | 322 | 1.55 | $941 |
| Unity | Bob Ward | 268 | 1.29 | $367 |
| Independent | Rick Berglund | 105 | 0.50 | $117 |
| Independent | Scott Attrill | 68 | 0.33 | $100 |
| Independent | Gerry McVeigh | 57 | 0.27 | $116 |
| Total valid votes | | 20,841 | 100.00 | |
| Total rejected ballots | | 86 | 0.41 | |
| Turnout | | 20,927 | 69.49 | |
Source: Elections BC

B.C. General Election 1996: Esquimalt-Metchosin
| Party | Candidate | Votes | % | ± | Expenditures |
|---|---|---|---|---|---|
| NDP | Moe Sihota | 13,833 | 59.54% | | $48,615 |
| Liberal | Heather Landon | 6,770 | 29.14% | | $29,141 |
| Reform | Scotty Davidson | 1,179 | 5.07% | | $8,971 |
| Progressive Democrat | Ron Whims | 921 | 3.96% | – | $100 |
| Green | Adam Charlesworth | 376 | 1.62% | – | $871 |
| Natural Law | Sylvia Danyluk | 60 | 0.26% | | $118 |
| Independent | David M. Shebib | 58 | 0.25% | | |
| Communist | Bob O'Neill | 35 | 0.15% | | $528 |
| Total valid votes | | 23,232 | 100.00% | | |
| Total rejected ballots | | 92 | 0.39% | | |
| Turnout | | 23,324 | 78.60% | | |

B.C. General Election 1991: Esquimalt-Metchosin
| Party | Candidate | Votes | % | ± | Expenditures |
|---|---|---|---|---|---|
| NDP | Moe Sihota | 13,458 | 59.16% | | $84,498 |
| Liberal | Dennis B. Jones | 6,888 | 30.28% | | $2,319 |
| Social Credit | Noel V. Pemberton-Billing | 2,402 | 10.56% | – | $40,550 |
| Total valid votes | | 22,748 | 100.00% | | |
| Total rejected ballots | | 400 | 1.73% | | |
| Turnout | | 23,148 | 73.43% | | |
