= Jane Sterk =

Canadian politician (born 1947)

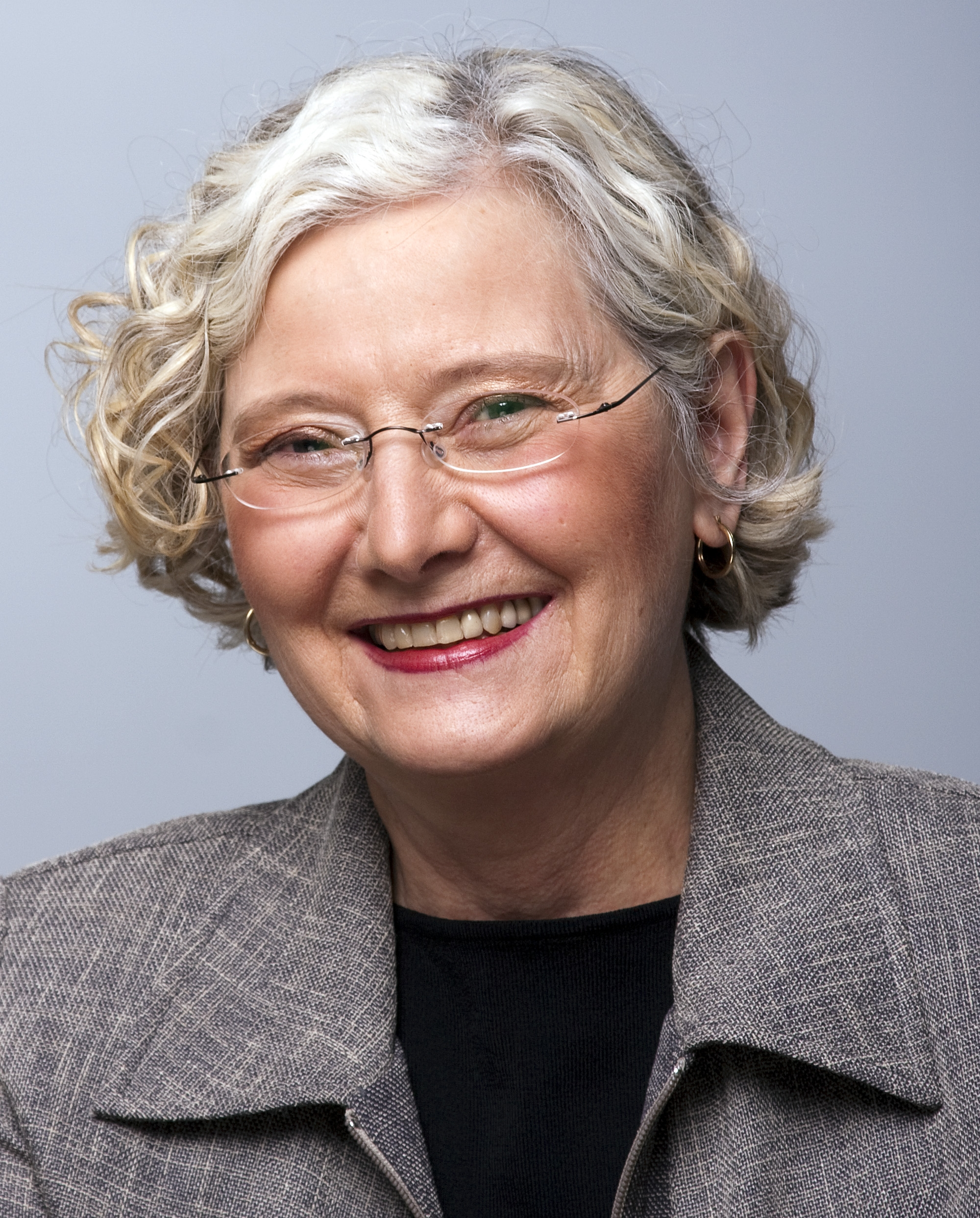

Leader of the Green Party of British Columbia
- In office 2007–2013
- Preceded by: Christopher Bennett
- Succeeded by: Adam Olsen (Interim)

Councillor, Esquimalt Township
- In office 2005–2008

Personal details
- Born: January 14, 1947 (age 79) Edmonton, Alberta, Canada
- Party: Green
- Occupation: Psychologist, businesswoman, academic, politician

Jane Sterk (born January 14, 1947) is a Canadian psychologist, businesswoman, academic, and politician. She is the former leader of the Green Party of British Columbia and a business professor at University Canada West. In the 2009 British Columbia provincial election she was a candidate in the riding of Esquimalt-Royal Roads and in the 2013 election was a candidate in Victoria-Beacon Hill. Sterk was elected councillor in the Township of Esquimalt in 2005 was elected leader of the provincial Green Party in October 2007. In the 2004 federal election and the 2005 provincial election as a candidate in the Esquimalt ridings, she placed fourth and third with 9% and 10% of the vote, respectively.

Before moving to Esquimalt in 1997, Sterk had lived in Edmonton. She earned a doctorate from the University of Alberta in counseling psychology and worked for Edmonton Public Schools and the Edmonton Board of Health. In 1983 she co-founded a business, Softwarehouse West, with a co-worker from the Board of Health. She sold computers, hardware, software, and related services until she retired to Esquimalt in 1997 intending to purchase a boat and sail recreationally. On August 13, 2013 Sterk announced she would resign as Green party leader.

== Before politics ==
Jane Sterk was born and raised in Edmonton with her father, who worked as the dean of education at the University of Alberta, and her mother, who was a pianist. At 20 years old, in 1967 she married a man named John, who went on to become a lawyer and author. Together they raised two sons. Sterk worked as a school teacher for Edmonton Public Schools for seven years. At the University of Alberta, she earned a master's degree in education and a doctorate in counseling psychology. She opened a private psychologist practice and worked for the Edmonton Board of Health.

In 1983, she opened a computer store, Softwarehouse West, with Gary Ford, a co-worker from the Edmonton Board of Health. By 1990, they employed 33 others, had $6 million in annual revenue, and had won the 1989 Alberta Small Business Owners of the Year award from the Chamber of Commerce. In 1992, the business split off its information management section, with Sterk heading the new company, USConnect Edmonton.

After working for another five years, Sterk and her husband retired in 1997 and moved to Esquimalt, British Columbia with the intention of sailing around the world. The couple purchased a boat and trained how to sail. They sailed in 1999 and passed Cape Flattery off the coast of Washington before turning back due to seasickness. After further preparation, they successfully sailed to Mexico and back in 2001.

== Politics ==
Sterk got involved in Green Party politics following her trip to Mexico, where she witnessed ocean pollution and rapid development causing environmental and social damage. She understood that sustainable and responsible development could have avoided the damage. Sterk had never belonged to a political party before and had previously voted for parties across the political spectrum, depending on the specific candidates. She joined the Green Party in 2001. She ran as the Green Party of Canada's candidate in the 2004 federal election for the Esquimalt—Juan de Fuca riding, where she came in fourth of six candidates, garnering 9.2% of the vote. She was the Green Party of British Columbia's candidate in the May 2005 provincial election in the Esquimalt-Metchosin riding. Of the four candidates in the riding, she placed third with 10.4% of the vote.

Later that year she ran for a seat on the Township of Esquimalt's city council. As a councilor she supported pedestrian rights, urban farming and using biofuels in the city vehicle fleet. She served as alternate director at the Capital Regional District. While she supported the construction of a regional sewage treatment plant, she, along with the other Esquimalt councilors, opposed locating the plant along the waterfront at Esquimalt's Macaulay Point.

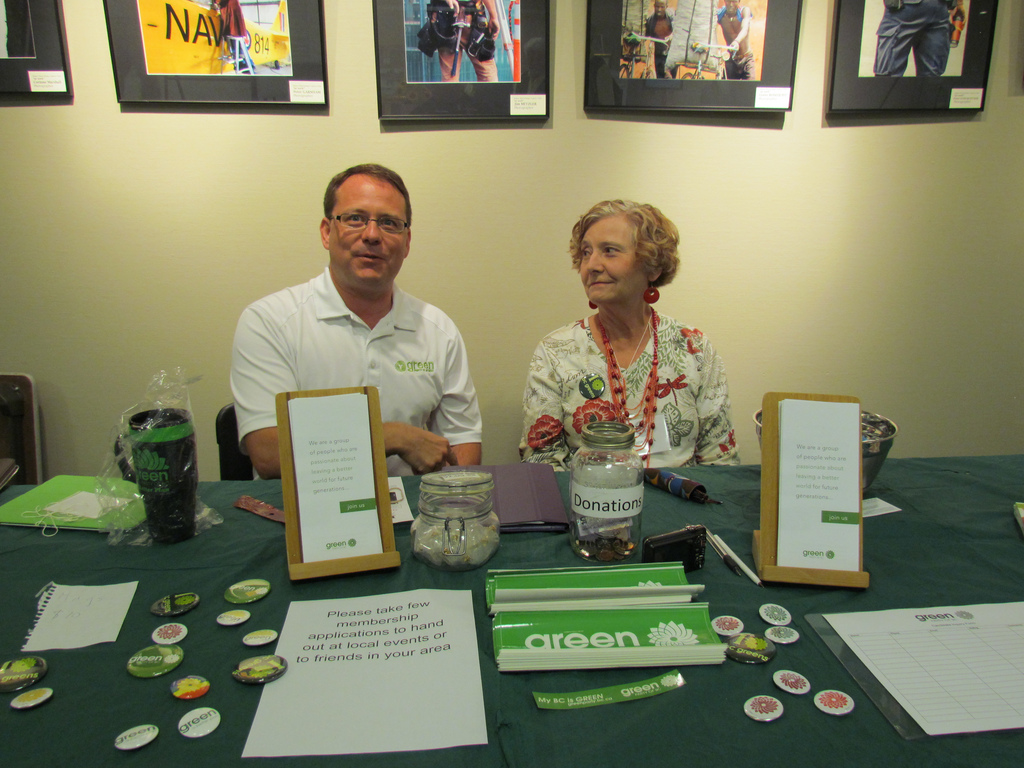
Mike Schreiner and Jane Sterk at the 2012 Green Party of Canada convention.

She served her three-year term as councilor while teaching business administration on the faculty at University Canada West and becoming leader of the Green Party of British Columbia. She took over for Christopher Bennett, who had been the interim leader of the party since the previous leader, Adriane Carr, left in September 2006 to become deputy leader of the national party. The party held a leadership vote during its annual convention in Victoria in October 2007. Competing for the leadership position against Sterk were small business owner Damian Kettlewell and filmmaker Ben West, both residents of Vancouver, community activist Jack Etkin of Victoria, and Bowen Island oceanographer Silvaine Zimmermann. The party used the preferential ballot, and Sterk won with West coming in second and Kettlewell third.

As leader Sterk set party priorities to increase membership, raise funds for the 2009 provincial election, and open a party office in Victoria. She participated in the October 2008 provincial by-election in Vancouver-Fairview and came in third with 7.2% of the popular vote. For the 2009 provincial election she ran in Esquimalt-Royal Roads the riding where she resides; she placed third behind the NDP and the BC Liberals.

Sterk was an unsuccessful candidate in Victoria-Beacon Hill in the 2013 provincial election. On August 13, 2013, she announced her resignation as party leader.

== Not-for-profit work ==
On January 1, 2014, Sterk became executive director of Cowichan Women Against Violence Society (CWAVS), in Duncan B.C. Since becoming executive director at the organization, Sterk has helped facilitate fundraisers such as the annual I Am Woman Hear Me Laff, and the annual CWAVS Gala. Prior to her work with CWAVS, Sterk's work in the public sector included consulting to non-profit organizations in the health, education and social service sectors on team building, case consultation and creating healthy work places. She offered training and continuing education courses in communication, consultation and counselling skills and improving self esteem.

== See also ==
- List of Green party leaders in Canada
