= Mike Farnworth =

Canadian politician (born 1959)

Mike Farnworth MLA
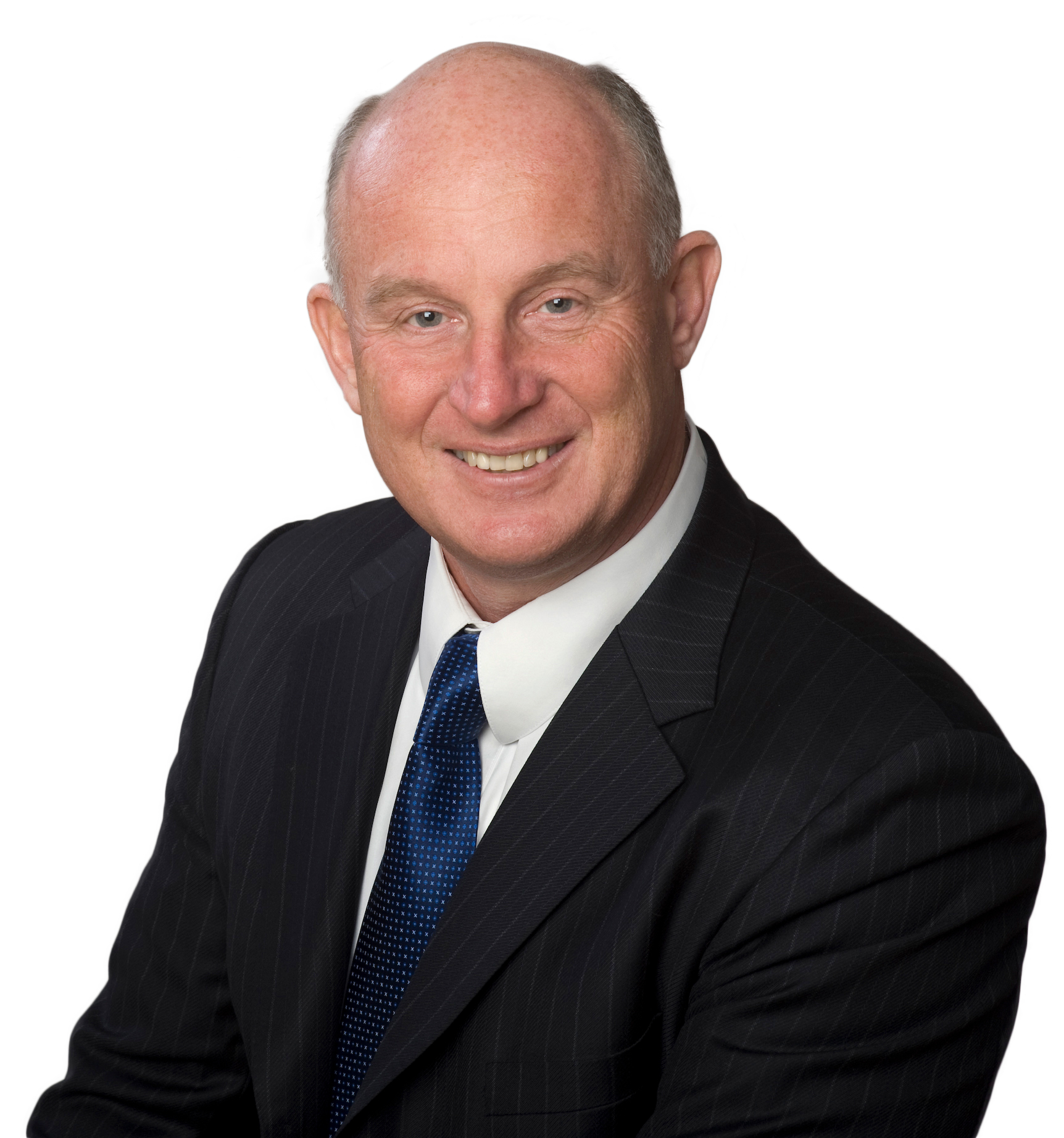
- Farnworth in 2017

Government House Leader of British Columbia
- In office November 18, 2024 – November 20, 2026
- Premier: David Eby
- Preceded by: Ravi Kahlon
- Succeeded by: Trevor Halford
- In office July 18, 2017 – December 7, 2022
- Premier: John Horgan; David Eby
- Preceded by: Mike de Jong
- Succeeded by: Ravi Kahlon

15th Deputy Premier of British Columbia
- In office October 28, 2021 – November 18, 2024
- Premier: John Horgan; David Eby
- Preceded by: Carole James (Note: Office vacant from November 2020, until October 2021.)
- Succeeded by: Niki Sharma

Dean of the Legislative Assembly of British Columbia
- Incumbent
- Assumed office October 24, 2020
- Preceded by: Linda Reid
- Succeeded by
Other ministerial positions
Minister of Transportation and Transit of British Columbia
In office November 18, 2024 – November 20, 2026
Premier	David Eby
Preceded by	Rob Fleming
Succeeded by	Trevor Halford
Minister of Public Safety and Solicitor General of British Columbia
In office July 18, 2017 – November 18, 2024
Premier	John Horgan; David Eby
Preceded by	Mike Morris
Succeeded by	Garry Begg
Minister of Social Development and Economic Security of British Columbia
In office November 1, 2000 – June 5, 2001
Premier	Ujjal Dosanjh
Preceded by	Jan Pullinger
Succeeded by	Position abolished
Minister of Health & Minister Responsible for Seniors of British Columbia
In office February 29, 2000 – November 1, 2000
Premier	Ujjal Dosanjh
Preceded by	Penny Priddy
Succeeded by	Corky Evans
Minister of Employment and Investment & Minister Responsible for Housing of British Columbia
In office February 18, 1998 – February 24, 2000
Premier	Glen Clark; Dan Miller
Preceded by	Dan Miller
Succeeded by	Gordon Wilson
Minister of Municipal Affairs and Housing of British Columbia
In office January 6, 1997 – February 18, 1998
Premier	Glen Clark
Preceded by	Dan Miller
Succeeded by	Jenny Kwan

Member of the British Columbia Legislative Assembly for Port Coquitlam Port Coquitlam-Burke Mountain (2005–2009)
- Incumbent
- Assumed office May 17, 2005
- Preceded by: Karn Manhas
- In office October 17, 1991 – May 16, 2001
- Preceded by: Constituency established
- Succeeded by: Karn Manhas

Personal details
- Born: July 23, 1959 (age 67) Bebington, England
- Party: New Democratic
- Domestic partner: Doug Vurtzinger
- Education: Simon Fraser University

Michael C. Farnworth MLA (born July 23, 1959) is a Canadian politician who has served as a member of the Legislative Assembly of British Columbia (MLA) representing the electoral districts of Port Coquitlam-Burke Mountain from 1991 to 2001 and Port Coquitlam since 2005. He has served as dean of the Legislative Assembly since 2020. A member of the New Democratic Party, he served in cabinet under premiers Glen Clark, Dan Miller, Ujjal Dosanjh, John Horgan, and David Eby in various roles including deputy premier of British Columbia and government house leader.

== Early life and education ==
Born in Bebington, England, Farnworth was raised in Port Coquitlam, British Columbia. He attended Simon Fraser University, earning a bachelor's degree in geography. Prior to entering elected office, Farnworth worked at CP Rail, Gulf Oil, and Mount Isa Mines.

== Political career ==
After serving three terms on Port Coquitlam City Council and working for Port Moody—Coquitlam Member of Parliament Ian Waddell, Farnworth ran for the BC NDP in the 1991 provincial election, in which he was first elected Member of the Legislative Assembly (MLA) for Port Coquitlam.

He was re-elected in 1996, and was appointed Minister of Municipal Affairs and Housing by Premier Glen Clark in January 1997, before becoming Minister of Employment and Investment and Minister Responsible for Housing in 1998. Under Premier Ujjal Dosanjh, Farnworth was named Minister of Health and Minister Responsible for Seniors in February 2000, before becoming Minister of Social Development and Economic Security in November that year.

He ran in the redistributed riding of Port Coquitlam-Burke Mountain in 2001, but lost his seat amidst the party's province-wide wipeout. Following the election, Farnworth worked in the Balkans and Iraq for the U.S.-based National Democratic Institute.

In the 2005 B.C. general election, Farnworth sought to take back his old seat, defeating the one-term Liberal Party incumbent Karn Manhas, and winning the riding with 11,844 votes (48.14% of valid votes). In 2009, he was re-elected to his fourth term in the recreated riding of Port Coquitlam with 54.71% of valid votes. He then ran in the 2011 NDP leadership election to replace outgoing leader Carole James; he lost to Adrian Dix after three rounds of voting.

Farnworth was returned to the legislature in the 2013 B.C. general election with more than half of the riding's popular vote, but the BC NDP lost the election despite favourable opinion polls leading up to the vote. Following Dix's resignation as party leader in September 2013, both Farnworth and John Horgan formally announced their candidacies for the post in March 2014. With a significant number of NDP MLAs backing Horgan (including Dawn Black, Joe Trasolini, and Fin Donnelly, all figures from Farnworth's own Tri-Cities area), Farnworth withdrew from the leadership race in April, leaving Horgan the sole candidate. After the deadline for nominations passed on May 1, Horgan was acclaimed leader of the BC NDP, and appointed Farnworth as opposition house leader.

Farnworth was re-elected MLA in the 2017 B.C. general election with more than 55% of the vote. In the subsequent NDP minority government, Farnworth was appointed Minister of Public Safety and Solicitor General. He retained the same cabinet posts in the NDP majority government following his re-election in 2020.

On October 28, 2021, Farnworth was appointed Deputy Premier of British Columbia by Premier John Horgan, in the wake of an announcement that Horgan was to undergo throat surgery on October 29. When Horgan stepped down as premier and was succeeded by David Eby, Farnworth retained his portfolios in Eby's cabinet.

While in Eby's cabinet, Farnworth, as Minister of Public Safety and Solicitor General, introduced Bill 34, the Restricting Public Consumption of Illegal Substances Act. The Act faced a Charter challenge from the Harm Reduction Nurses Association (HRNA), and the court issued an injunction preventing the Act from being brought into force. The provincial government attempted to appeal this ruling, but was unsuccessful. On the request of provincial officials, the federal government later revoked exemptions that allowed for public drug consumption in the first place, rendering the Act unnecessary; the province repealed the Act shortly thereafter, rendering the legal challenge moot.

In 2026, Farnworth endorsed Rob Ashton in that year's federal NDP leadership race.

== Personal life ==
Farnworth has publicly acknowledged that he is gay. He has had a relationship with his partner, Doug, for over twenty five years.

== Electoral history ==
2026 British Columbia general election: Port Coquitlam
Party	Candidate	Votes	%	±%	Expenditures
New Democratic	Mike Farnworth	10,626	45.20		
Conservative	Keenan Adams	10,201	43.39		
Green	Stephanie Hendy	2,034	8.65		
Unaffiliated (Note: Endorsed by OneBC but listed as unaffiliated due to "paperwork technicalities")	Lee-Ann Bates	301	1.28	—	
Libertarian	Lewis C. Dahlby	297	1.26	—	
Total valid votes		23,459	99.78		
Total rejected ballots		52	0.22		
Turnout		23,511			
Registered voters					
New Democratic hold		Swing		−6.65	
Source: Elections BC

2024 British Columbia general election: Port Coquitlam
Party	Candidate	Votes	%	±%	Expenditures
New Democratic	Mike Farnworth	13,843	53.87	−10.27	$19,589.22
Conservative	Keenan Adams	9,967	38.79	–	$12,191.99
Green	Adam Bremner-Akins	1,644	6.40	−6.22	$1,973.77
Libertarian	Lewis Dahlby	244	0.95	−1.40	$512.50
Total valid votes/expense limit		25,698	99.85	–	$71,700.08
Total rejected ballots		38	0.15	–	
Turnout		25,736	57.70	+3.34	
Registered voters		44,601			
New Democratic hold		Swing		−24.53	
Source: Elections BC

2020 British Columbia general election: Port Coquitlam
Party	Candidate	Votes	%	±%	Expenditures
New Democratic	Mike Farnworth	15,370	64.14	+8.35	$9,774.62
Liberal	Mehran Zargham	5,009	20.90	−9.15	$4,583.11
Green	Erik Minty	3,023	12.61	−0.22	$2,051.19
Libertarian	Lewis Clarke Dahlby	563	2.35	+1.37	$0.00
Total valid votes		23,965	100.00	–	
Total rejected ballots		146	0.61	+0.09	
Turnout		24,111	54.36	–8.08	
Registered voters		44,358			
New Democratic hold		Swing		+4.69	
Source: Elections BC

2017 British Columbia general election: Port Coquitlam
Party	Candidate	Votes	%	±%	Expenditures
New Democratic	Mike Farnworth	14,079	55.79	+2.85	$52,164
Liberal	Susan Chambers	7,582	30.05	−6.52	$26,734
Green	Jason Hanley	3,237	12.83	–	$1,177
Libertarian	Lewis Clarke Dahlby	248	0.98	−0.63	$89
Cascadia	Billy Gibbons	88	0.35	–	$1,973
Total valid votes		25,234	100.00	–	
Total rejected ballots		131	0.52	−0.20	
Turnout		25,365	62.44	+5.18	
Registered voters		40,621			
Source: Elections BC

2013 British Columbia general election: Port Coquitlam
Party	Candidate	Votes	%	±%	Expenditures
New Democratic	Mike Farnworth	11,755	52.94	−1.77	$86,221
Liberal	Barbara Lu	8,120	36.57	−2.28	$23,507
Conservative	Ryan Hague	1,525	6.87	–	$3,928
Your Political Party	Brent Williams	447	2.01	+1.34	$610
Libertarian	Jogender Dahiya	358	1.61	+0.73	$872
Total valid votes		22,205	100.00	–	
Total rejected ballots		160	0.72	+0.20	
Turnout		22,365	57.26	+2.05	
Registered voters		39,059			
Source: Elections BC

2011 British Columbia New Democratic Party leadership election
Candidate	First ballot		Second ballot		Third ballot	
Candidate	Votes	Percent	Votes	Percent	Votes	Percent
Adrian Dix	7,638	38.2%	7,748	39.3%	9,772	51.8%
Mike Farnworth	6,979	34.9%	6,951	35.2%	9,095	48.2%
John Horgan	4,844	24.2%	5,034	25.5%		
Dana Larsen	531	2.7%				

2009 British Columbia general election: Port Coquitlam
Party	Candidate	Votes	%	±	Expenditures
New Democratic	Mike Farnworth	11,121	54.71%		$63,090
Liberal	Bernie Hiller	7,896	38.85%		$68,768
Green	Cole Bertsch	994	4.89%	–	$350
Libertarian	Lewis Dahlby	178	0.88%		$250
Your Political Party	Brent Williams	137	0.67%		$775
Total Valid Votes		20,326	100%		
Total Rejected Ballots		106	0.52%		
Turnout		20,432	55.21%		

BC General Election 2005: Port Coquitlam-Burke Mountain
Party	Candidate	Votes	%	±%
NDP	Mike Farnworth	11,844	48.14%	
Liberal	Greg Moore	10,752	43.70%	
Green	Bill Aaroe	1,691	6.87%	
Social Credit	Anthony Yao	228	0.93%	
Libertarian	Lewis Dahlby	90	0.37%	
Total		24,605		

BC General Election 2001:Port Coquitlam-Burke Mountain
Party	Candidate	Votes	%	±	Expenditures
Liberal	Karn Manhas	9,963	45.19%		$49,642
NDP	Mike Farnworth	7,198	32.65%		$31,152
Unity	Chris Delaney	2,297	10.42%		$13,849
Green	Kelli Gallagher	1,841	8.36%	–	$44
Marijuana	Doug Hewer	446	2.02%		$394
Independent	Craig Braconnier	151	0.68%		
Reform	Clay Fanstone	150	0.68%		$468
Total valid votes		22,046	100.00%		
Total rejected ballots		54	0.24%		
Turnout		22,100	74.66%		

BC General Election 1996: Port Coquitlam
Party	Candidate	Votes	%	±	Expenditures
NDP	Mike Farnworth	14,767	46.37%		$45,109
Liberal	Irene Barr	13,310	41.80%		$52,332
Progressive Democrat	Rick Howard	1,789	5.62%	–	$1,058
Reform	Lawrence Glazer	1,335	4.19%		$2,965
Green	Debra Eilers	417	1.31%	–	$100
Libertarian	Michael Wiebe	102	0.32%		
Social Credit	Stan Mortensen	124	0.39%	–	$1,582
Total valid votes		31,844	100.00%		
Total rejected ballots		152	0.48%		
Turnout		31,996	73.48%		

BC General Election 1991: Port Coquitlam
Party	Candidate	Votes	%	±	Expenditures
NDP	Mike Farnworth	11,435	45.47%		$22,300
Liberal	Ernest R. Jilg	9,929	39.49%		$2,384
Social Credit	Jim Allard	3,781	15.04%	–	$49,126
Total valid votes		25,145	100.00%		
Total rejected ballots		532	2.07%		
Turnout		25,677	76.45%		

== Notes ==
British Columbia provincial government of John Horgan
Cabinet post (1)
Predecessor	Office	Successor
Mike Morris	Minister of Public Safety and Solicitor General; July 18, 2017–	Incumbent
