= Carole James =

Canadian politician (born 1957)

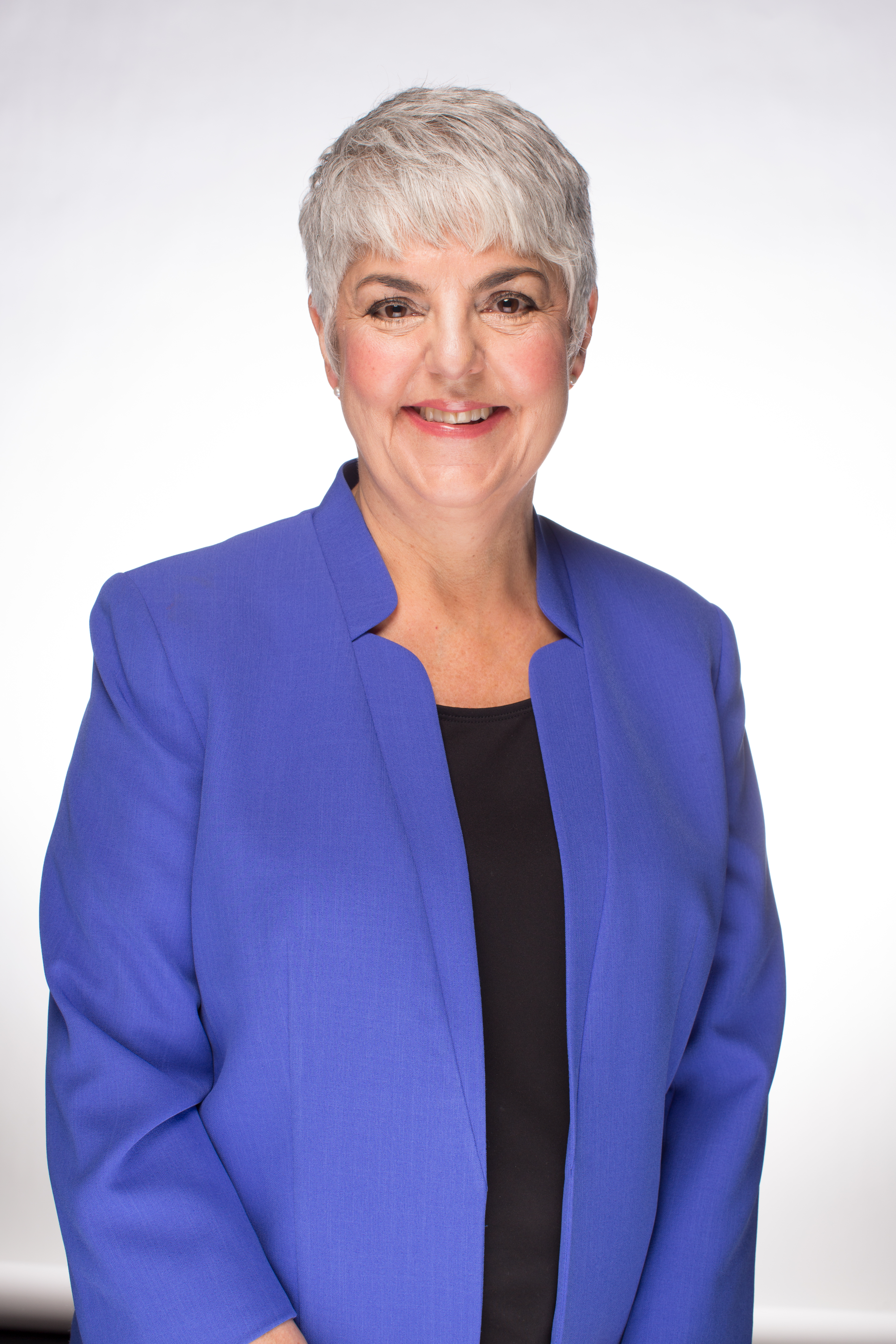

14th Deputy Premier of British Columbia
- In office July 18, 2017 – November 26, 2020
- Premier: John Horgan
- Preceded by: Rich Coleman
- Succeeded by: Mike Farnworth (Note: Office vacant between November 2020 and October 2021.)

Minister of Finance of British Columbia
- In office July 18, 2017 – November 26, 2020
- Premier: John Horgan
- Preceded by: Mike de Jong
- Succeeded by: Selina Robinson

Member of the British Columbia Legislative Assembly for Victoria-Beacon Hill
- In office May 17, 2005 – October 24, 2020
- Preceded by: Jeff Bray
- Succeeded by: Grace Lore

Leader of the Opposition of British Columbia
- In office May 17, 2005 – January 20, 2011
- Preceded by: Joy MacPhail
- Succeeded by: Dawn Black

Leader of the British Columbia New Democratic Party
- In office November 23, 2003 – January 20, 2011
- Preceded by: Joy MacPhail (interim)
- Succeeded by: Dawn Black (interim)

Personal details
- Born: Carole Alison James; December 22, 1957 (age 68) Dukinfield, England
- Party: New Democratic
- Spouse: Albert Gerow (m. 2004)
- Occupation: School trustee; social worker

Carole Alison James (born December 22, 1957) is a Canadian politician and former public administrator, who represented Victoria-Beacon Hill in the Legislative Assembly of British Columbia from 2005 to 2020. A member of the British Columbia New Democratic Party (NDP), she was the party's leader and Leader of the Opposition in British Columbia from 2005 to 2011. Following her resignation as leader, she stayed in politics and served as the 14th deputy premier of British Columbia and minister of finance under John Horgan, from 2017 to 2020.

== Background ==
James was born in Dukinfield, Cheshire, England, and raised in North Battleford, Saskatchewan, and in Victoria, British Columbia. Her father was Métis but she grew up without him and did not learn about her Indigenous heritage until after completing high school.

After graduating from high school, James and her first husband worked in institutions for the developmentally disabled in Alberta and British Columbia. As a mother of young children, Alison and Evan, she became involved in a parents' group in Victoria, which led to her first foray into politics. In 2004, James married her long-time partner, Albert Gerow, a First Nations artist and former Burns Lake municipal councillor and Royal Canadian Mounted Police officer. Gerow was the chief of the Ts'il Kaz Koh First Nation in Burns Lake. James has been a foster parent for over twenty years.

On July 13, 2006, James announced publicly that she had been diagnosed with localized uterine endometrial cancer. She underwent surgery and radiation treatment and her prognosis is considered to be excellent. In March 2020, James announced that she was diagnosed with Parkinson's disease and did not run in the 2020 British Columbia general election.

== Early career ==
James served on the Greater Victoria School Board from 1990 to 2001, including seven terms as chair, and gained a province-wide profile in her unprecedented five terms as president of the BC School Trustees Association. She also served at the national level as vice-president of the Canadian School Boards Association. From 1999 to 2001, James held the position of director of child care policy for the British Columbia government. In addition, she served on several local and provincial panels and committees.

In 2001, James ran unsuccessfully for the NDP in the riding of Victoria-Beacon Hill only losing by 35 votes to BC Liberal candidate Jeff Bray. She subsequently moved to Prince George, British Columbia, to serve as the director of child and family services for Carrier Sekani Family Services, and later as co-ordinator of the Northern Aboriginal Authority for Families.

== Political career ==
=== BC NDP leadership ===
James was elected leader of the provincial NDP on November 23, 2003. At the time of her election the party was suffering low morale in the wake of the 2001 provincial election, which had reduced the NDP to only two seats in the Legislative Assembly. During her campaign to win the party leadership, James pledged to modernize the NDP's ideology and internal structures and build a broader base of support for the party, a move which alienated some traditional supporters.

During the 2005 provincial election, James campaigned heavily on her name and image. On election night James and the NDP surprised many supporters and critics alike with a very strong electoral showing; the party winning 41.52 per cent of the popular vote (a 19.96 per cent increase from the 2001 election result) and 33 out of 79 seats in the Legislative Assembly. James won her seat in the riding of Victoria-Beacon Hill with 57.01 per cent of the vote, defeating the incumbent BC Liberal MLA Jeff Bray by an almost 2-1 margin. She was re-elected in 2009, 2013, and 2017.

=== Leadership controversy and resignation ===
On December 1, 2010, Jenny Kwan, a prominent party member, released a statement to the media criticizing James's leadership of the New Democratic Party, and calling for an immediate leadership convention. In response to Kwan's statement, James called an emergency caucus session to address opposition to her continued leadership. While the session was meant to take place on December 5, it was later postponed so that private discussions could take place with a group of thirteen caucus members opposed to James' continued leadership.

On short notice on December 6, James announced she would resign the party's leadership. She continued in the position, however, until Dawn Black was chosen to act as Interim Leader.

James served as opposition Critic for Children and Family Development under her successor, Adrian Dix. She was promoted to the Finance portfolio under John Horgan, and was also named deputy leader of the BC NDP and hence Deputy Leader of the Opposition.

=== In government ===
When the BC NDP won a minority government in 2017, James became deputy premier and Finance minister. She resigned from both positions in 2020, shortly after leaving the provincial legislature.

== Electoral record ==
2017 British Columbia general election: Victoria-Beacon Hill
Party	Candidate	Votes	%	±%	Expenditures
New Democratic	Carole James	16,057	53.05	+4.40	$2,272
Green	Kalen Harris	9,194	30.38	−3.50	$14,825
Liberal	Karen Bill	4,689	15.49	−1.47	$30,914
Libertarian	Art Lowe	190	0.63	–	$225
Independent	Jordan Reichert	102	0.34	–	$190
Independent	David Shebib	35	0.11	–	$50
Total valid votes		30,267	100.00	–	
Total rejected ballots		115	0.38	−0.11	
Turnout		30,382	64.20	+5.53	
Registered voters		47,321			
Source: Elections BC

2013 British Columbia general election: Victoria-Beacon Hill
Party	Candidate	Votes	%
New Democratic	Carole James	12,697	48.82
Green	Jane Sterk	8,796	33.82
Liberal	Karen Bill	4,386	16.86
Communist	John Shaw	131	0.50
Total valid votes		26,010	100.00
Total rejected ballots		128	0.49
Turnout		26,138	58.67
Source: Elections BC

2009 British Columbia general election: Victoria-Beacon Hill
Party	Candidate	Votes	%	±%
New Democratic	Carole James	13,400	55.37	−1.84
Liberal	Dallas Henault	6,375	26.34	−4.39
Green	Adam SaAB	4,106	16.97	+6.40
Independent	Saul Andersen	319	1.32	+1.32
Total valid votes		24,200		

2005 British Columbia general election: Victoria-Beacon Hill
Party	Candidate	Votes	%	±%
New Democratic	Carole James	15,064	57.21	+20.31
Liberal	Jeff Bray	8,091	30.73	−6.31
Green	John William Miller	2,783	10.57	−11.15
Democratic Reform	David McCaig	157	0.60	+0.60
Independent	Benjamin McConchie	121	0.46	+0.46
Independent	Ingmar Lee	116	0.44	+0.44
Total		26,332	100.00	

=== 2003 British Columbia New Democratic Party leadership election ===
First Ballot
Candidate	Votes	Percentage
Carole James	325	41.91
Nils Jensen	169	21.81
Leonard Krog	150	19.35
Steve Orcherton	87	11.23
Mehdi Najari	32	4.13
Peter Dimitrov	12	1.55
Total	775	100.00

Second Ballot
Candidate	Weighted Votes	Percentage	+/-
Carole James	395	50.90	+8.96
Leonard Krog	219	28.22	+8.87
Nils Jensen	162	20.88	–0.93
Total	776	100.00	

2001 British Columbia general election: Victoria-Beacon Hill
Party	Candidate	Votes	%	Expenditures
Liberal	Jeff Bray	9,297	37.04	$52,485
New Democratic	Carole James	9,262	36.90	$44,963
Green	Walter Meyer zu Erpen	5,453	21.72	$8,210
Marijuana	Troy Tompkins	532	2.12	$70
Unity	Gregory Paul Michael Hartnell	290	1.15	$3,817
Independent	Rob Botterell	205	0.82	$911
Communist	Kirsten Goodacre	64	0.25	$427
Total valid votes		25,103	100.00	
Total rejected ballots		153	0.53	
Turnout		25,238	68.63	

== Notes ==
British Columbia provincial government of John Horgan
Cabinet posts (2)
Predecessor	Office	Successor
Rich Coleman	Deputy Premier of British Columbia; July 18, 2017–2020	Mike Farnworth
Mike de Jong	Minister of Finance; July 18, 2017–2020	Selina Robinson
