= 2023 Conservative Party of British Columbia leadership election =

Political party leadership election in Canada

- March 31, 2023
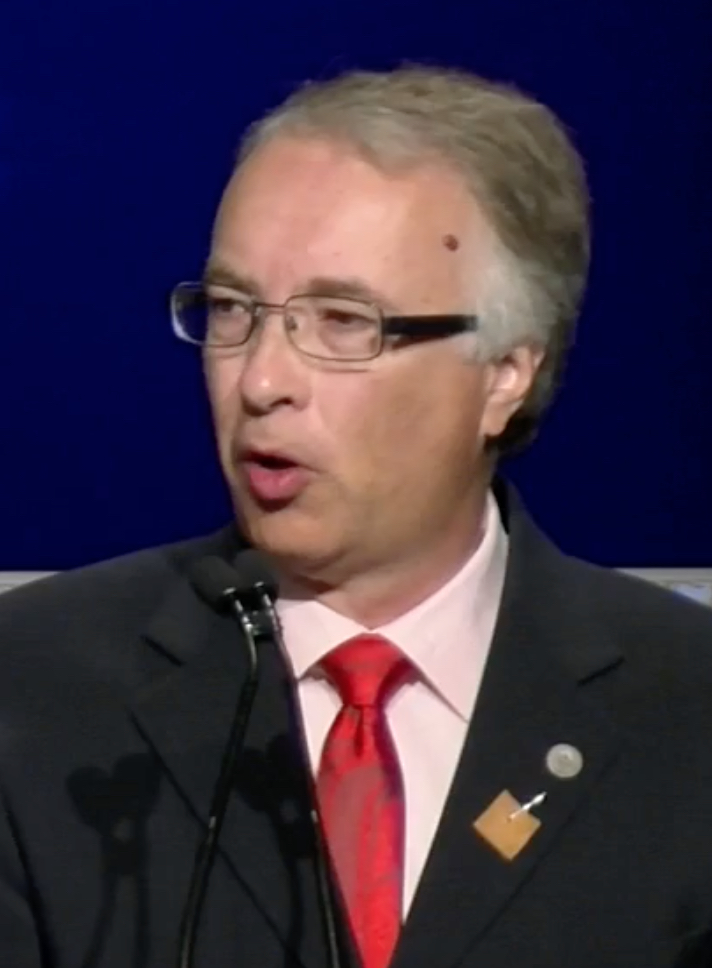
Candidate	John Rustad
First ballot	Acclaimed
Leader before election
Trevor Bolin
Elected Leader
John Rustad

2023 Conservative Party of British Columbia leadership election
- Date: March 31, 2023
- Resigning leader: Trevor Bolin
- Won by: John Rustad

A Conservative Party of British Columbia leadership election was held on March 31, 2023, to elect a new party leader, following the resignation of Trevor Bolin.

On March 31, 2023, Rustad was acclaimed as the leader after being the only person to enter the race. A "leadership celebration" took place on April 2 to celebrate Rustad's acclamation as leader.

== Acclaimed candidate ==
- John Rustad, MLA for Nechako Lakes (2005–present), MLA for Prince George–Omineca (2005–2009), Minister of Aboriginal Relations and Reconciliation (2013–2017)

== Declined ==
People who expressed interest in running but did not, include:

- Scott Anderson, Interim leader of the Conservative Party of British Columbia, 2017–2019, and former Vernon city councillor
