= Macklin McCall =

Canadian politician

Macklin McCall MLA

Government Whip of the Legislative Assembly of British Columbia
- Incumbent
- Assumed office November 20, 2026
- Premier: Lorne Doerkson
- Deputy: Jaime Stein
- Preceded by: Janet Routledge

Official Opposition Critic for Solicitor General and Public Safety of British Columbia
- In office July 2025 – November 20, 2026
- Leader: John Rustad
- Preceded by: Elenore Sturko
- Succeeded by: Vacant

Official Opposition Critic for Emergency Management of British Columbia
- In office November 20, 2024 – July 2025
- Leader: John Rustad
- Preceded by: Lorne Doerkson
- Succeeded by: Sheldon Clare

Member of the British Columbia Legislative Assembly for West Kelowna-Peachland
- Incumbent
- Assumed office October 19, 2024
- Preceded by: Constituency established

Personal details
- Party: BC Conservatives

Macklin McCall MLA is a Canadian politician who has served as a member of the Legislative Assembly of British Columbia (MLA) representing the electoral district of West Kelowna-Peachland since 2024. He is a member of the Conservative Party.

== Early life and career ==
McCall was raised on a farm in Okanagan Falls, British Columbia, spending the last 15 years in West Kelowna. He pursued higher education in criminology, psychology, and sociology at Okanagan College in Penticton.

Before entering politics, McCall was a Royal Canadian Mounted Police constable in Lake Country, West Kelowna and Kelowna for 19 years, and before that an Auxiliary Constable with the Penticton RCMP for 2 years. He worked on addressing mental health challenges firsthand particularly in a Police and Crisis Team role. In Kelowna, he worked downtown with the enforcement unit and bike patrols.

== Political career ==
On December 16, 2023, McCall was nominated as the Conservative Party candidate for West Kelowna-Peachland. He went on to win a seat in the Legislative Assembly of BC, garnering 50.9% of the votes, and defeating NDP candidate Krystal Smith.

McCall served as the Official Opposition Critic for Emergency Management from November 2024 to July 2025. Where he focused on how British Columbia responds to emergencies. He focused on and advocated for a proactive response to emergencies, not reactive.

Of note, he introduced a private members bill, the Emergency and Disaster Management Amendment Act, 2025 which would have brought in the BC Volunteer Corps to allow citizens to have basic training to assist in emergency response such as helping on spot fires or helping with police road blocks.

This bill did not pass second reading by just one vote however it was popular publicly on social media.

He then served as the Official Opposition Critic for Solicitor General and Public Safety until June 29, 2026.

He currently serves as the Chief Whip for British Columbia’s Official Opposition.

== Political views ==
=== COVID-19 pandemic ===
In 2024, McCall stated that he supported protests against the impact of public health measures on civil liberties during the COVID-19 pandemic.

== Electoral history ==
2024 British Columbia general election: West Kelowna-Peachland
Party	Candidate	Votes	%	±%	Expenditures
Conservative	Macklin McCall	13,475	50.9%		
New Democratic	Krystal Smith	7,394	27.9%	-3.5	
Unaffiliated	Stephen Johnston	5,630	21.2%		
Total valid votes		26,499	–		
Total rejected ballots					
Turnout					
Registered voters					
Source: Elections BC

== See also ==
- 43rd Parliament of British Columbia
