= Len Fox =

Len Fox may refer to:

- Len Fox (writer) (1905–2004), Australian journalist, activist, and painter
- Len Fox (politician) (1943–2018) in British Columbia for Social Credit and Reform Party
