= Paul Nettleton =

Canadian politician and lawyer

Member of the British Columbia Legislative Assembly for Prince George-Omineca
- In office May 28, 1996 – May 17, 2005
- Preceded by: Len Fox
- Succeeded by: John Rustad

Personal details
- Party: BC Liberal
- Occupation: Lawyer

Paul Nettleton is a lawyer and former politician from British Columbia, Canada. He was called to the bar in 1993.

A member of the British Columbia Liberal Party, he was elected from Prince George-Omineca to the Legislative Assembly of British Columbia in 1996 and re-elected in 2001.

On November 13, 2002 he publicly opposed the Campbell government's introduction of Bill 10 to break up and privatize the BC Hydro electric utility. He was removed from caucus several days later and sat as an Independent Liberal until the 2005 election. In that election he ran as an independent candidate in Prince George-Mount Robson, but placed third out of five with 2,158 votes. In 2006 Nettleton began to work as a "Poverty Lawyer" for Legal Services of Nunavut. In 2008 he was promoted to Executive Director for Legal Services of Nunavut where he was responsible for the delivery of legal services throughout the Territory. At that time he lived in the capital of Nunavut, Iqaluit. In November 2009, he joined the law firm of Robson O'Connor located in his hometown of Ladysmith, British Columbia. In January 2011, he became a partner in the law firm.
