= Mcfd =

- MCFD is the common abbreviation for the Ministry of Children and Family Development (British Columbia)
- The volumetric flow rate equivalent to 1,000 (or sometimes 1,000,000) cubic feet per day is often shortened to Mcfd.
