= Kristina Loewen =

Canadian politician

The Honourable Kristina Loewen MLA

Minister of Children and Family Development of British Columbia
- Incumbent
- Assumed office November 20, 2026
- Premier: Lorne Doerkson
- Preceded by: Jodie Wickens

Member of the British Columbia Legislative Assembly for Kelowna Centre
- Incumbent
- Assumed office October 19, 2024
- Preceded by: Constituency established

Personal details
- Party: BC Conservative

Kristina Loewen MLA is a Canadian politician who has served as a member of the Legislative Assembly of British Columbia (MLA) representing the electoral district of Kelowna Centre since 2024. She is a member of the Conservative Party.

== Early life and career ==
Loewen has been a part of the Kelowna community for over 25 years. She has been married to her husband Andrew for 26 years and together they have four children. As her children were growing up she was involved in fundraising and community collaboration efforts eventually heading up their preschool as president and sitting on its council for many years. She also has had extensive experience in the healthcare system first as a care-aide before becoming a doula, supporting over 200 births over a 10 year period. For the past five years before getting involved in politics, Loewen was a real estate professional.

== Political career ==
On February 17, 2024, Loewen was nominated as the Conservative Party of BC's candidate for Kelowna Centre. She went on to win her seat in the Legislative Assembly of BC defeating BC NDP candidate Loyal Woodridge. A judicial recount, which was automatically required because the difference in the final count was less than 1/500 of the total votes, confirmed her victory, with a margin of 40 votes. Loewen was criticized during the campaign after social media posts were released in which she promoted conspiracy theorists and compared pandemic restrictions to the Holocaust, as well as for her past promotion of essential oils for multi-level marketing company Young Living and refusal to engage in interviews or debates.

She currently serves in the official opposition's shadow cabinet as the Critic for Social Development and Poverty Reduction as well as the Critic for the Ministry of Children and Families. Her policy priorities include crime and safety, addiction treatment and mental health support and affordable housing and fiscal responsibility. She also championed Bailey's law and fights for more protections for victims of intimate partner violence.

== Electoral history ==
2024 British Columbia general election: Kelowna Centre
Party	Candidate	Votes	%	±%	Expenditures
Conservative	Kristina Loewen	11,033	42.85	–	$42,377.15
New Democratic	Loyal Wooldridge	10,993	42.69	+10.4	$28,338.11
Unaffiliated	Michael Humer	2,613	10.15	–	$15,530.72
Green	Bryce Tippe	1,111	4.31	-11.1	$0.00
Total valid votes/expense limit		25,750	99.87	–	$71,700.08
Total rejected ballots		33	0.13	–	
Turnout		25,783	56.49	–	
Registered voters		45,642			
Conservative notional gain from BC United		Swing		N/A (Note: Swing cannot be calculated as BC United did not run a candidate in this riding.)	
Source: Elections BC
