= West Kelowna-Peachland =

Provincial electoral district in British Columbia, Canada

British Columbia electoral district
- Interactive map of riding boundaries

Provincial electoral district
- Legislature: Legislative Assembly of British Columbia
MLA
Macklin McCall
Conservative
- District created: 2023
- First contested: 2024
- Last contested: 2026

Demographics
- Population (2021): 55,664
- Area (km²): 1,438
- Pop. density (per km²): 38.7
- Census division: Central Okanagan
- Census subdivision(s): Peachland, Tsinstikeptum 9, Tsinstikeptum 10, West Kelowna

West Kelowna-Peachland is a provincial electoral district in British Columbia that has been represented in the Legislative Assembly since 2024.

Created under the 2021 British Columbia electoral redistribution, the riding was first contested in the 2024 British Columbia general election. It was created out of parts of Kelowna West, Penticton and a small part of Fraser-Nicola.

== Demographics ==
Population, 2021	55,664
Area (km^{2})	1,438
Pop. Density (people per km^{2})	38
Source: BC Electoral Boundaries Commission

== Geography ==
The district comprises those portions of the Regional District of Central Okanagan on the west shore of Okanagan Lake, taking its name from the two municipalities that contain the bulk of its population, West Kelowna and Peachland.

== Members of the Legislative Assembly ==
This district has elected the following members of the Legislative Assembly:

Assembly	Years	Member	Party
West Kelowna-Peachland; Riding created from Fraser-Nicola, Kelowna West and Pentiction
43rd	2024–2026	Macklin McCall	Conservative
44th	2026–present	Macklin McCall	Conservative

== Election results ==
2026 British Columbia general election
The 2026 general election will be held on October 24.
Party	Candidate	Votes	%	±%	Expenditures
Conservative	Macklin McCall				
New Democratic	George Morgan				
Green	Adam Frank			–	
Total valid votes					
Total rejected ballots					
Turnout					
Registered voters					
Source: Elections BC

2024 British Columbia general election
Party	Candidate	Votes	%	±%	Expenditures
Conservative	Macklin McCall	13,475	50.9%		
New Democratic	Krystal Smith	7,394	27.9%	-3.5	
Unaffiliated	Stephen Johnston	5,630	21.2%		
Total valid votes		26,499	–		
Total rejected ballots					
Turnout					
Registered voters					
Source: Elections BC

2020 provincial election redistributed results
Party	%
Liberal	54.5
New Democratic	31.4
Green	10.4

== See also ==
- List of British Columbia provincial electoral districts
- Canadian provincial electoral districts
