= Kelowna Centre =

Provincial electoral district in British Columbia, Canada

British Columbia electoral district
- Interactive map of riding boundaries

Provincial electoral district
- Legislature: Legislative Assembly of British Columbia
MLA
Kristina Loewen
Conservative
- District created: 2023
- First contested: 2024
- Last contested: 2026

Demographics
- Population (2021): 59,446
- Area (km²): 72
- Pop. density (per km²): 825.6
- Census division: Central Okanagan
- Census subdivision: Kelowna (part)

Kelowna Centre is a provincial electoral district in British Columbia that has been represented in the Legislative Assembly of British Columbia since 2024.

Created under the 2021 British Columbia electoral redistribution, the district was first contested in the 2024 general election. It was created out of parts of Kelowna West, Kelowna-Lake Country and Kelowna-Mission.

== Demographics ==
Population, 2021	59,446
Area (km^{2})	72
Pop. Density (people per km^{2})	825
Source: BC Electoral Boundaries Commission

== Geography ==
The district consists of territory that was previously part of the Kelowna West riding, including downtown Kelowna and the Glenmore neighbourhood, as well as areas transferred from the districts of Kelowna-Mission and Kelowna-Lake Country.

== Members of the Legislative Assembly ==
Assembly	Years	Member	Party
Kelowna Centre; Riding created from Kelowna West, Kelowna-Lake Country and Kelowna-Mission
43rd	2024–2026	Kristina Loewen	Conservative
44th	2026–present	Kristina Loewen	Conservative

== Election results ==
2026 British Columbia general election
Party	Candidate	Votes	%	±%	Expenditures
Conservative	Kristina Loewen	10,791	48.22	+5.37	
New Democratic	Loyal Wooldridge	10,659	47.63	+4.94	
OneBC	Bill Desrosiers	873	3.90	-	
Total valid votes		22,323	99.75		
Total rejected ballots		56	0.25		
Turnout					
Registered voters					
Conservative hold		Swing		+5.16	
Source: Elections BC

2024 British Columbia general election
Party	Candidate	Votes	%	±%	Expenditures
Conservative	Kristina Loewen	11,033	42.85	–	$42,377.15
New Democratic	Loyal Wooldridge	10,993	42.69	+10.4	$28,338.11
Unaffiliated	Michael Humer	2,613	10.15	–	$15,530.72
Green	Bryce Tippe	1,111	4.31	-11.1	$0.00
Total valid votes/expense limit		25,750	99.87	–	$71,700.08
Total rejected ballots		33	0.13	–	
Turnout		25,783	56.49	–	
Registered voters		45,642			
Conservative notional gain from BC United		Swing		N/A (Note: Swing cannot be calculated as BC United did not run a candidate in this riding.)	
Source: Elections BC

2020 provincial election redistributed results
Party	%
Liberal	49.8
New Democratic	32.3
Green	15.4

== See also ==
- List of British Columbia provincial electoral districts
- Canadian provincial electoral districts
