= Restricted foster home =

Child fostering model

Restricted foster homes are a model of fostering children practiced in British Columbia, Canada. It involves a child being placed in a foster home with a family member, neighbour, or close family friend instead of a standard foster home placement. Restricted foster homes are unlike regular foster homes in the sense that the caregivers probably had a relationship with the child before they entered into foster care.

Restricted foster home families are typically extended family members of the child in care who have a significant relationship with the child. The name comes from the fact that the carers are restricted to caring for their own family members and will not be asked to foster other children.

Child Protection Agencies will sometimes place a child in a restricted foster home as way of maintaining consistency in the child’s life while they are away from their parents.

== Process ==
The process to become a restricted foster home is involves criminal records checks, home visits, assessment interviews, and a medical assessment done by a physician. Families are also expected to take the Foster Care Education Program which consists of a total of 53 hours of training and includes topics such as the effect of neglect and abuse on children, separation and loss, and suicide intervention and prevention.

== Training and maintenance payments ==
Restricted foster homes are one of the many parts of foster care in British Columbia. These homes are considered Ministry of Children and Family Development appointed foster homes therefore in addition to receiving the same training they also get the same monthly maintenance payments as a regular family care home does. Restricted foster homes are also eligible to receive a start up allowance to cover the initial costs of taking in an additional member into the home. They also receive access to the same support services that a regular foster home would have such as a Ministry designated resource worker, a social worker, and the option to obtain a membership with the BC Federation of Foster Parents Association.

Restricted foster homes are different than regular foster homes in the sense that their caregiver approval is based specifically on the child they are looking to care for. Therefore when the specific child leaves their home they are no longer considered a foster home unless they make the arrangements to become a regular family home.
