= Diane Black (Canadian politician) =

Canadian politician

Diane Black MLA

Member of the British Columbia Legislative Assembly for Nechako Lakes
- Incumbent
- Assumed office October 24, 2026
- Preceded by: John Rustad

Personal details
- Party: BC Conservative

Diane Black MLA is a Canadian politician who has served as a member of the Legislative Assembly of British Columbia (MLA) representing the electoral district of Nechako Lakes since 2026. She is a member of the Conservative Party.

== Early career ==
Black served as the Associate Vice President Finance for the Nicola Valley Institute of Technology.

== Political career ==
In the 2026 British Columbia general election, Black ran as the Conservative Party candidate for the electoral district of Nechako Lakes following the retirement of former party leader John Rustad. She won the seat with 64% of the vote.

== Personal life ==
Black is the great-granddaughter of Vanderhoof's first doctor of settler descent.

== Electoral history ==
2026 British Columbia general election: Nechako Lakes
Party	Candidate	Votes	%	±%	Expenditures
Conservative	Diane Black	6,322	63.21	–4.24	
New Democratic	Jesse Gervais	2,365	23.65	–3.60	
Unaffiliated	Clint Lambert	1,314	13.14	–	
Total valid votes		10,001	99.83	–	
Total rejected ballots		17	0.17	–0.03	
Turnout		10,018	53.26	–10.11	
Registered voters		18,808			
Conservative hold		Swing		+0.28	
Source: Elections BC
