= Trevor Bolin =

Canadian politician (born 1979)

Mayor-elect of Fort St. John
- Assuming office TBD
- Succeeding: Lilia Hansen

Leader of the Conservative Party of British Columbia
- In office April 8, 2019 – March 31, 2023
- Preceded by: Scott Anderson (interim)
- Succeeded by: John Rustad

Fort St. John City Councillor
- Incumbent
- Assumed office November 15, 2008

Personal details
- Born: October 10, 1979 (age 47) Fort St. John, British Columbia, Canada
- Party: BC Conservative (provincial); Independent (municipal)

Trevor Bolin (born October 10, 1979) is a Canadian politician, businessman, and author who served as the leader of the Conservative Party of British Columbia from 2019 to 2023. From 2008 to 2026, he has served on the Fort St. John city council, until being elected mayor in 2026.

== Early career ==
Bolin is a real estate agent owning RE/MAX Action Realty. He also owns Burger King locations in Fort St. John, Dawson Creek, and Grande Prairie, Alberta.

== Political career ==
On April 8, 2019, Bolin was elected leader of the Conservative Party of British Columbia.

During the 2020 general election, Bolin ran unsuccessfully as a candidate in the Peace River North electoral district during the in 2024 general election. He was defeated by Liberal candidate Dan Davies.

On March 3, 2023, he announced that he would be stepping down as leader and would serve as interim leader until a new leader is selected. He also announced that he would again run as the candidate in the Peace River North during the in 2024 general election. He continued as the interim leader until March 31, when John Rustad was acclaimed as the new leader.

In a Facebook post on June 23, 2023, Bolin announced that he would not seek the Conservative nomination in Peace River North in 2024, despite previously announcing plans to.

== Writing ==
Bolin is a published author with his first book Take Charge and Change Your Life Today being released in the United States in 2011, followed by a Canadian book tour in 2012. This publication received the Rising Star award from the publication company.

== Electoral history ==
2020 British Columbia general election: Peace River North
Party	Candidate	Votes	%	±%	Expenditures
Liberal	Dan Davies	6,746	55.76	−10.51	$32,293.82
Conservative	Trevor Bolin	4,150	34.30	–	$0.00
New Democratic	Danielle Monroe	1,202	9.94	+3.37	$739.00
Total valid votes		12,098	99.29	–	
Total rejected ballots		86	0.71		
Turnout		12,184	46.48		
Registered voters		26,216			
Source: Elections BC
