= Ministry of Children and Family Development (British Columbia) =

Provincial ministry overview
- Formed: June 5, 2001; 25 years ago
- Type: Child protection service
- Jurisdiction: Province of British Columbia
- Headquarters: Victoria, British Columbia
- Annual budget: $1.3 Billion Canadian dollar 2014-15
- Minister responsible: Kristina Loewen
- Deputy Minister responsible: David Galbraith
- Website: mcf.gov.bc.ca

Map

The Ministry of Children and Family Development (MCFD) is a ministry of the government of British Columbia in Canada. The MCFD is responsible for the child protection service across the province and is provided through 429 ministry offices in 5 regions and a number of delegated Indigenous agencies. The child protection staff are supported by the provincial office of the Child Protection Division.

== Minister ==
Since November 20, 2026, the minister of children and family development has been Kristina Loewen.

=== List of ministers ===
List of ministers
Minister	Term start	Term end	Political party	Ministry
Gordie Hogg	June 5, 2001	January 23, 2004	Liberal	Campbell
Christy Clark	January 23, 2004	September 20, 2004	Liberal	Campbell
Stan Hagen	September 20, 2004	August 15, 2006	Liberal	Campbell
Tom Christensen	August 15, 2006	June 10, 2009	Liberal	Campbell
Mary Polak	June 10, 2009	March 14, 2011	Liberal	Campbell
Mary McNeil	March 14, 2011	September 5, 2012	Liberal	C. Clark
Stephanie Cadieux	September 5, 2012	July 18, 2017	Liberal	C. Clark
Katrine Conroy	July 18, 2017	November 26, 2020	New Democratic	Horgan
Mitzi Dean	November 26, 2020	January 15, 2024	New Democratic	Horgan; Eby
Grace Lore	January 15, 2024	November 20, 2026	New Democratic	Eby
Kristina Loewen	November 20, 2026	Incumbent	Conservative	Doerkson

== Foster care ==
In British Columbia foster care is one option for providing homes for children who can't live safely with their own parents or caregivers. Foster parents provide the day-to-day care for a child on behalf of MCFD.

=== Types of care homes ===
Any child or youth placed in foster care must be placed in a MCFD approved facility. There are two main types of foster care arrangements: Family Care Homes and Specialized Homes and Support Services. These services are both directly funded by MCFD.

=== Family care homes ===
A family care home is a home that provides a family like atmosphere to children who cannot be cared for in their own home. The families in these homes provide the most parent like care to children in their care while still providing the child support with their parents and other extended family members when possible.

There are five different levels of family care homes which include: regular family care, restricted family care, and specialized family care, Levels 1, 2, and 3.

=== Restricted foster homes ===
A restricted foster home placement is that in which a child is placed in the home of a relative or someone who knows them already. The home needs to be approved by MCFD prior to placing a child in it.

=== Regular family foster home ===
A regular family foster placement is that in which a child is placed in a home approved by MCFD to provide care for the child. These placements provide care for children of various ages and abilities. They are different from restricted foster homes in the sense that these families don’t usually know the child before they are placed in their care.

=== Specialized family homes ===
A specialized family care home placement is that in which the child who requires the care has moderate to extreme behaviour, developmental delays, or health problems. The three levels of specialized care all require the caregiver to have specialized experience and training. There is also a specific approval process in place to be able to care for these types of children. Levels 2 and 3 may sometimes provide specialized intervention and assessment services.

=== Specialized residential services ===
Specialized residential services include services such as group homes, intensive child care resources, and treatment foster home programs. These services may be operated by an individual, a nonprofit organization or a private organization.

=== Funding for foster homes ===
The amount of funding a family receives for a child in their care varies according to the type of care being provided as well as the age of the child. As of July 1, 2025, a regular or restricted foster home receives a maintenance amount of $1549.20 for a child aged 0–11 and $1726.33 for a child aged 12–19. Specialized family homes receive more funding depending on what level of care they provide in the form of a service payment.

== Rights of children and youth in care ==
In December 2008, the Federation of BC Youth in Care Network released a handbook, titled Your Life – Your Rights, that explains the rights of youth in care in a youth-friendly manner.

== Criticism of MCFD for failure to protect children ==
Ted Hughes authored a report critical of MCFD and issued recommendations to prevent further deaths of children involved with MCFD. MCFD has been repeatedly been criticized for failing to implement recommendations of the Hughes Report.
