= Nechako Lakes (provincial electoral district) =

Provincial electoral district in British Columbia, Canada

British Columbia electoral district
- Interactive map of riding boundaries

Provincial electoral district
- Legislature: Legislative Assembly of British Columbia
MLA
Diane Black
Conservative
- District created: 2008
- First contested: 2009
- Last contested: 2026

Demographics
- Population (2021): 25,293
- Area (km²): 73,815
- Pop. density (per km²): 0.34
- Census division: Bulkley-Nechako
- Census subdivision(s): Burns Lake, Fort St. James, Fraser Lake, Granisle, Houston, Vanderhoof

Nechako Lakes is a provincial electoral district in British Columbia that has been represented in the Legislative Assembly of British Columbia since 2009.

Created under the 2008 British Columbia electoral redistribution, the riding was first contested in the 2009 general election. It was formed from parts of Bulkley Valley-Stikine and Prince George-Omineca.

== Demographics ==
Population, 2021	25,293
Area (km^{2})	73,815
Pop. Density (people per km^{2})	0.34
Source: BC Electoral Boundaries Commission

== Geography ==
Nechako Lakes comprises almost the entire area within the Regional District of Bulkley-Nechako, located in central British Columbia. Communities in the electoral district consist of Vanderhoof, Houston, Burns Lake, Fort St. James, Fraser Lake, and Granisle. Notable regional communities not in this electoral district include Smithers and Telkwa, which are part of the Bulkley Valley-Stikine electoral district.

== Members of the Legislative Assembly ==
This riding has elected the following members of the Legislative Assembly:

Assembly	Years	Member	Party
Nechako Lakes; Riding created from Prince George-Omineca
39th	2009–2013	John Rustad	Liberal
40th	2013–2017	John Rustad	Liberal
41st	2017–2020	John Rustad	Liberal
42nd	2020–2022	John Rustad	Liberal
42nd	2022–2023	John Rustad	Independent
42nd	2023–2024	John Rustad	Conservative
43rd	2024–2026	John Rustad	Conservative
43rd	2026–2026	John Rustad	Independent
43rd	2026–2026	John Rustad	Conservative
44th	2026–present	Diane Black	Conservative

== Election results ==
2026 British Columbia general election
** Preliminary results — Not yet official **
Party	Candidate	Votes	%	±%
Conservative	Diane Black	5,954	63.86	-3.58
New Democratic	Jesse Gervais	2,150	23.06	-4.15
Unaffiliated	Clint Lambert	1,219	13.08	–
Total valid votes		9,323	99.85	
Total rejected ballots		14	0.15	-0.06
Turnout		9,337		
Registered voters				
Source: Elections BC
Conservative hold		Swing		+0.28

2024 British Columbia general election
Party	Candidate	Votes	%	±%	Expenditures
Conservative	John Rustad	7,851	67.45	–	$33,284.32
New Democratic	Murphy Abraham	3,167	27.21	-7.13	$11,629.69
Green	Douglas Gook	622	5.34	–	$535.00
Total valid votes/expense limit		11,640	99.79	–	$71,700.08
Total rejected ballots		25	0.21	–	
Turnout		11,665	63.37	+13.46	
Registered voters		18,407			
Conservative hold		Swing		–	
Source: Elections BC

2020 British Columbia general election
Party	Candidate	Votes	%	±%	Expenditures
Liberal	John Rustad	4,611	52.24	−2.15	$17,423.82
New Democratic	Anne Marie Sam	3,031	34.34	+4.53	$9,236.20
Christian Heritage	Dan Stuart	413	4.68	–	$991.53
Libertarian	Jon Rempel	403	4.57	+0.32	$0.00
Independent	Margo Maley	368	4.17	–	$1,280.76
Total valid votes/expense limit		8,826	99.38	–	$66,123.96
Total rejected ballots		55	0.62	–0.06	
Turnout		8,881	49.91	–9.15	
Registered voters		17,794			
Liberal hold		Swing		–3.34	
Source: Elections BC

2017 British Columbia general election
Party	Candidate	Votes	%	±%	Expenditures
Liberal	John Rustad	5,307	54.39	+0.6	$43,487
New Democratic	Anne Marie Sam	2,909	29.81	+2.16	$14,578
Green	Douglas Norman Gook	878	9.00	+3.85	$163
Libertarian	Jon Rempel	438	4.49	–	$3,100
Independent	Al Trampuh	226	2.31	–	
Total valid votes		9,758	100.00		
Total rejected ballots		67	0.68		
Turnout		9,825	59.06		
Registered voters		16,636			
Source: Elections BC

2013 British Columbia general election
Party	Candidate	Votes	%	±%	Expenditures
Liberal	John Rustad	5,324	53.79	–1.97	$75,052
New Democratic	Sussanne Skidmore-Hewlett	2,737	27.65	–7.64	$56,108
Conservative	Dan Brooks	1,253	12.66	–	$52,518
Green	Colin Hamm	510	5.15	–1.15	$1,599
Advocational	Beverly Bird	74	0.75	–	$3,009
Total valid votes		9,898	100.0		
Total rejected ballots		42	0.42		
Turnout		9,940	58.46		
Liberal hold		Swing		+2.84	
Source: Elections BC

2011 British Columbia sales tax referendum
Side	Votes	%
No	4,141	53.32
Yes	3,626	46.68

2009 British Columbia general election
Party	Candidate	Votes	%	Expenditures
Liberal	John Rustad	4,949	55.76	$60,522
New Democratic	Byron Goerz	3,133	35.29	$7,480
Green	Gerard Riley	559	6.30	$350
Refederation	Mike Summers	235	2.65	$1,110
Total valid votes		8,876	99.25	
Total rejected ballots		67	0.75	
Turnout		8,943	54.80	
Source: Elections BC

== See also ==
- List of British Columbia provincial electoral districts
- Canadian provincial electoral districts

Legislative Assembly of British Columbia
Preceded by Vancouver-Quilchena	Constituency represented by the leader of the Opposition; 2024–2025	Succeeded by Surrey-White Rock
