= 2024 British Columbia general election =

Canadian provincial election

- October 19, 2024

All 93 seats in the Legislative Assembly of British Columbia 47 seats needed for a majority
- Opinion polls
- Turnout: 58.4% (2,109,658) (▲3.9 pp)
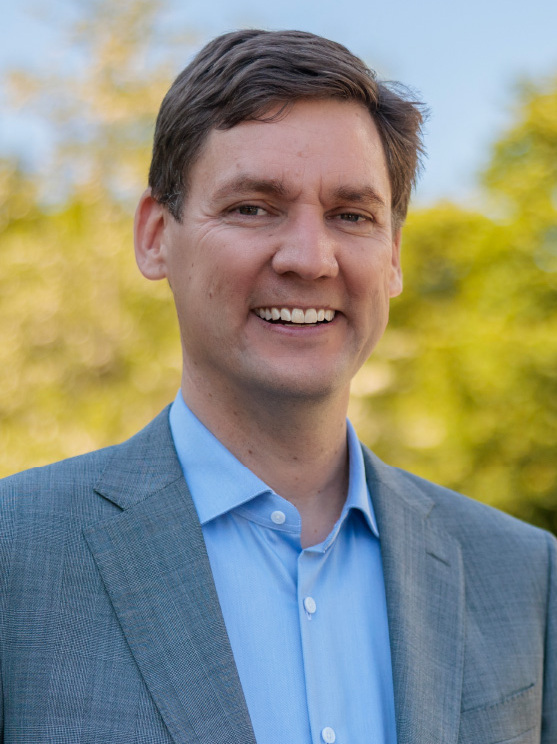

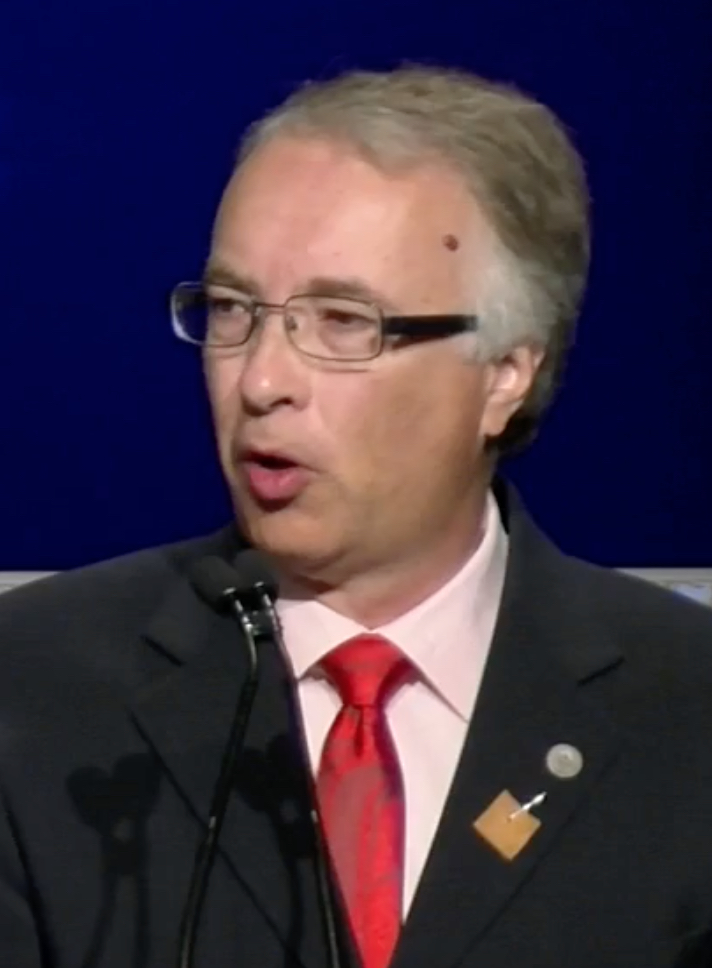

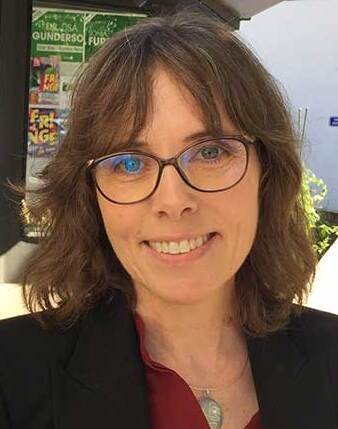
	First party	Second party	Third party
Leader	David Eby	John Rustad	Sonia Furstenau
Party	New Democratic	Conservative	Green
Leader since	October 21, 2022	March 31, 2023	September 14, 2020
Leader's seat	Vancouver-Point Grey	Nechako Lakes	Ran in Victoria-Beacon Hill (lost) (Note: Furstenau was the incumbent MLA for Cowichan Valley, opting to switch ridings.)
Last election	57 seats, 47.69%	0 seats, 1.91%	2 seats, 15.09%
Seats before	55	8	2
Seats won	47	44	2
Seat change	▼8	▲36	Steady
Popular vote	944,463	911,142	173,493
Percentage	44.86%	43.28%	8.24%
Swing	▼2.83 pp	▲41.37 pp	▼6.85 pp
- Popular vote by riding

- Composition of the Legislative Assembly after the election
Premier before election
David Eby
New Democratic
Premier after election
David Eby
New Democratic

The 2024 British Columbia general election was held on October 19, 2024, to elect 93 members (MLAs) of the Legislative Assembly to serve in the 43rd parliament of the Canadian province of British Columbia.

The election was the first to be held since a significant redistribution of electoral boundaries was finalised in 2023. The Legislative Assembly also expanded in size from 87 seats to 93 seats. The election saw a broad political realignment in British Columbia; amid a resurgence for the Conservative Party of British Columbia, the official opposition BC United (formerly the BC Liberals) withdrew from the race a little over a month before the election to avoid splitting the vote. BC United formally endorsed the Conservatives, with several BC United candidates either defecting to the Conservatives or standing as independent or unaligned candidates; this marked the party's first absence from a provincial election since 1900.

The NDP won a third term in government and second consecutive majority government, but with a net loss of eight seats. Their majority was decided by a single seat, and the riding of Surrey-Guildford was decided by 22 votes after a judicial recount, meaning that the overall result of the election was decided by 22 votes.

The Conservatives formed the official opposition, with their best electoral performance since 1928, and the first election since 1952 where they won more than two seats.

== Redistribution of electoral districts ==
The Electoral Boundaries Commission was required to complete a redistribution of seats following the 2020 general election, and the government subsequently appointed commissioners in October 2021. Their final report was completed April 3, 2023. An act was passed later that year, providing for a consequential increase in seats from 87 to 93, upon the next election. The following changes were made:

Abolished	New
Renaming of districts
Burnaby-Lougheed	Burnaby East
Cariboo North	Prince George-North Cariboo
Chilliwack	Chilliwack North
Chilliwack-Kent	Chilliwack-Cultus Lake
Kootenay East	Kootenay-Rockies
Kootenay West	Kootenay-Monashee
Maple Ridge-Mission	Maple Ridge East
Nelson-Creston	Kootenay Central
North Coast	North Coast-Haida Gwaii
Penticton	Penticton-Summerland
Port Moody-Coquitlam	Port Moody-Burquitlam
Richmond North Centre	Richmond-Bridgeport
Richmond South Centre	Richmond Centre
Shuswap	Salmon Arm-Shuswap
Stikine	Bulkley Valley-Stikine
Vancouver-Kingsway	Vancouver-Renfrew
Vancouver-Mount Pleasant	Vancouver-Strathcona
Vernon-Monashee	Vernon-Lumby
Drawn from other districts
	Surrey-Serpentine River (Note: From parts of Surrey-Cloverdale, Surrey-Panorama and Surrey-Fleetwood.)
Reorganization of districts
Burnaby-Deer Lake; Burnaby-Edmonds; New Westminster	Burnaby Centre; Burnaby-New Westminster; Burnaby South-Metrotown; New Westminster-Coquitlam
Esquimalt-Metchosin; Langford-Juan de Fuca	Esquimalt-Colwood; Juan de Fuca-Malahat; Langford-Highlands
Kamloops-North Thompson; Kamloops-South Thompson	Kamloops Centre; Kamloops-North Thompson
Kelowna-Lake Country; Kelowna West	Kelowna Centre; Kelowna-Lake Country-Coldstream; West Kelowna-Peachland
Langley; Langley East	Langley-Abbotsford; Langley-Walnut Grove; Langley-Willowbrook
Nanaimo; Nanaimo-North Cowichan; Parksville-Qualicum	Ladysmith-Oceanside; Nanaimo-Gabriola Island; Nanaimo-Lantzville
Surrey-Green Timbers; Surrey-Whalley	Surrey City Centre; Surrey North
Vancouver-Fairview; Vancouver-False Creek	Vancouver-Little Mountain; Vancouver-South Granville; Vancouver-Yaletown

== Background ==
Section 23 of British Columbia's Constitution Act provides that general elections occur on the third Saturday in October of the fourth calendar year after the last election. The same section, though, makes the fixed election date subject to the lieutenant governor's prerogative to dissolve the Legislative Assembly as they see fit (in practice, on the advice of the province's premier or following a vote of non-confidence).

=== Standings ===
42nd Parliament of British Columbia – Movement in seats held up to the election (2020–2024)
Party	2020	Gain/(loss) due to					2024
Party	2020	Leaves caucus	Resignation as MLA	Removed from caucus	Switching allegiance	Byelection hold	2024
New Democratic	57	(1)	(2)	(1)		2	55
Liberal	28		(2)	(1)	(7)	2	20
BC United (from April 12, 2023)	28		(2)	(1)	(7)	2	20
Conservative	–				8		8
Green	2						2
Independent	–	1		2	(1)		2
Total	87	–	(4)	–	–	4	87

=== Incumbents not standing for re-election ===
MLA	Party	Seat	First elected	Date announced
Dan Ashton	BC United	Penticton	2013	December 20, 2023
Harry Bains	New Democratic	Surrey-Newton	2005	July 4, 2024
Shirley Bond	BC United	Prince George-Valemount	2001	August 29, 2024
Katrine Conroy	New Democratic	Kootenay West	2005	May 10, 2024
Katrina Chen	New Democratic	Burnaby-Lougheed	2017	November 22, 2023
Doug Clovechok	BC United	Columbia River-Revelstoke	2017	February 24, 2024
Mitzi Dean	New Democratic	Esquimalt-Metchosin	2017	August 31, 2024
Mike de Jong	BC United	Abbotsford West	1994 by-election	February 14, 2024
Fin Donnelly	New Democratic	Coquitlam-Burke Mountain	2020	May 9, 2024
Kevin Falcon	BC United	Vancouver-Quilchena	2022 by-election (Note: Previously served from 2001 to 2013.)	August 28, 2024
Rob Fleming	New Democratic	Victoria-Swan Lake	2005	July 4, 2024
George Heyman	New Democratic	Vancouver-Fairview	2013	March 4, 2024
Greg Kyllo	BC United	Shuswap	2013	November 22, 2023
Michael Lee	BC United	Vancouver-Langara	2017	July 11, 2024
Norm Letnick	BC United	Kelowna-Lake Country	2009	November 22, 2023
Renee Merrifield	BC United	Kelowna-Mission	2020	May 16, 2024
Mike Morris	BC United	Prince George-Mackenzie	2013	March 21, 2023
Adam Olsen	Green	Saanich North and the Islands	2017	June 25, 2024
Bruce Ralston	New Democratic	Surrey-Whalley	2005	July 2, 2024
Murray Rankin	New Democratic	Oak Bay-Gordon Head	2020	June 3, 2024
Jennifer Rice	New Democratic	North Coast	2013	May 16, 2024
Selina Robinson	Independent (Note: Elected as member of the NDP, resigned from caucus on March 6, 2024)	Coquitlam-Maillardville	2013	February 5, 2024
Ellis Ross	BC United	Skeena	2017	January 22, 2024
Doug Routley	New Democratic	Nanaimo-North Cowichan	2005	September 26, 2023
Nicholas Simons	New Democratic	Powell River-Sunshine Coast	2005	September 1, 2023
Ben Stewart	BC United	Kelowna West	2018 by-election (Note: Previously served from 2009 to 2013.)	November 22, 2023
Todd Stone	BC United	Kamloops-South Thompson	2013	August 29, 2024
Jordan Sturdy	BC United	West Vancouver-Sea to Sky	2013	January 12, 2024
Jackie Tegart	BC United	Fraser-Nicola	2013	September 3, 2024

BC United MLA Karin Kirkpatrick originally announced on February 8, 2024, that she would not seek re-election. However, after the campaign suspension of BC United, she changed her mind and decided to run as an independent candidate.

=== Withdrawal of BC United ===
On August 28, 2024, BC United leader and Leader of the Opposition Kevin Falcon announced that the party would pull out of the campaign. Falcon endorsed the BC Conservatives, saying "John Rustad and I haven't always agreed on everything, but one thing is clear: our province cannot take another four years of the NDP". Falcon noted that this was done to prevent vote splitting in competitive ridings.

On September 20, BCU announced that it would not field any paper candidates in this campaign. Under BC's election law, they can still maintain their registration as long as they nominate candidates in the next round (tentatively scheduled for 2028).

At the time of BC United's withdrawal, the party had nominated candidates in 56 ridings. (Note: The party website listed 57 candidates at the time of the withdrawal of the party, however, Dave Sidhu was still listed as a candidate in Abbotsford West despite dropping out as a candidate earlier in August.) Mike Bernier (Peace River South) pointed out that Falcon, as leader, only had the power to withdraw the party from the forthcoming contest, but could not do so on behalf of the individual candidates. Elections BC confirmed that that was a correct interpretation of the elections law, and only the candidates could choose to withdraw or to stand as independent or unaffiliated on the ballot. Several BCU candidates were openly considering accepting a Conservative nomination. Bernier confirmed that he had spoken with Karin Kirkpatrick (West Vancouver-Capilano) about the possibility of several of the BCU candidates forming their own alliance or possible new party before the required registration deadline, or even forming a party post-election, as Legislature rules recognize a party as long as it has at least two MLAs.

Of the 56 originally nominated BC United candidates, 30 withdrew from the campaign, 9 continued to run as a Conservative candidate, while 17 continued to run as an independent or unaffilated candidate.

=== Independent wave ===
40 independent and 14 unaffiliated candidates, a record number, were in the race by the time nominations closed. 18 of those candidates were previously BC United candidates or MLAs. This is notable, as only one Independent has been elected to the Legislature in the past 60 years—Vicki Huntington (Delta South) in 2009 and 2013. At the beginning of the campaign, six incumbent MLAs announced that they intended to run as such, of which five had been with BCU and one with the NDP. Karin Kirkpatrick expressed the view that the Conservatives had brought this phenomenon on themselves in believing that BCU members would follow Falcon's lead in switching over. "That’s not how democracy works. People want to run. They’re going to run, and so they’re floundering right now."

=== Vote counting ===
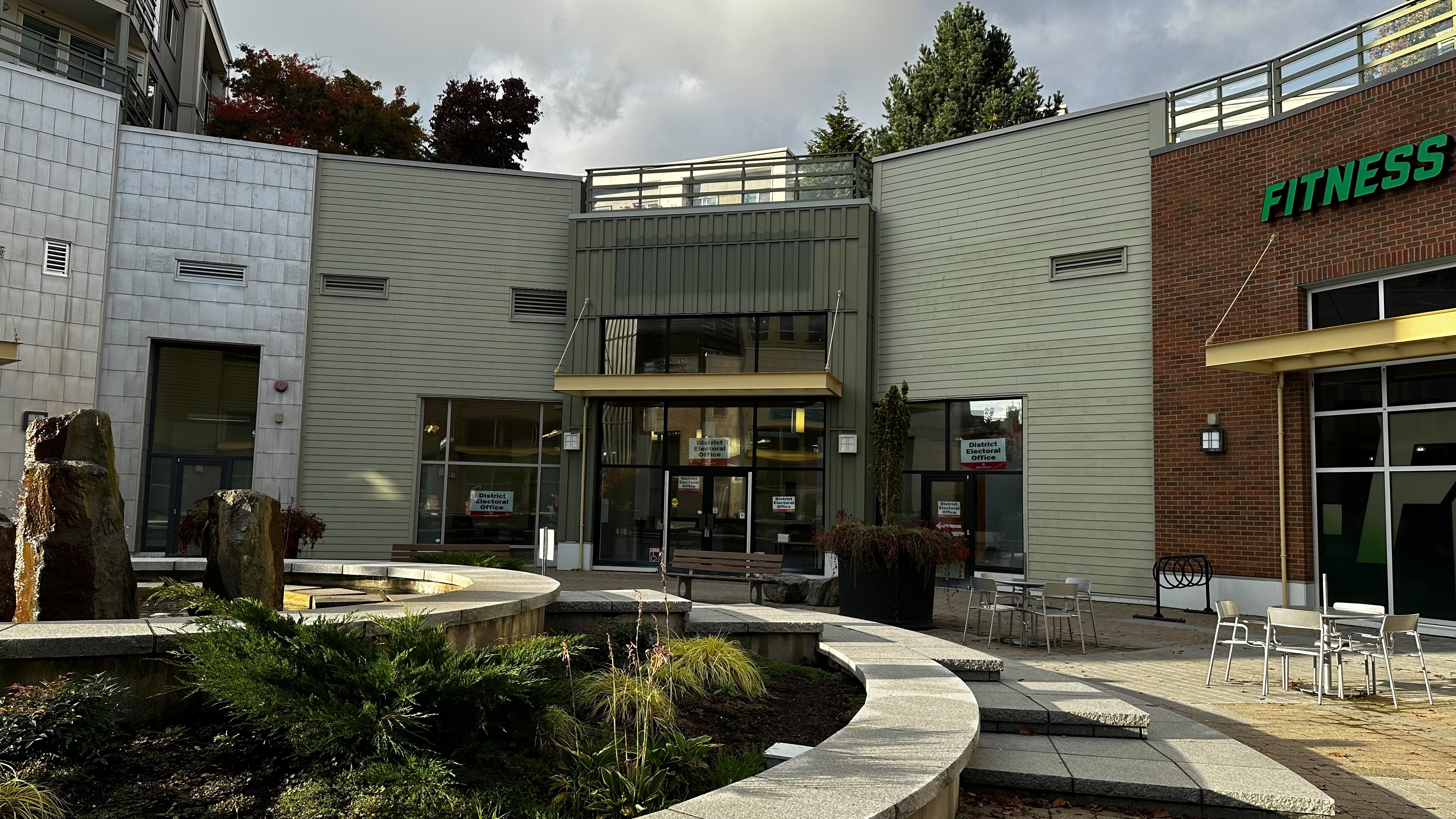
A polling place for the general election in Surrey.

After trials during by-elections in 2022, Elections BC adopted digital voter rolls and electronic tabulation machines for the first time during this election. The digital roll made it possible to cast ballots at any polling location across the province and enabled mail-in ballots returned before the last day of advance voting – October 16 – to be counted instantly (they were previously counted two weeks after Election Day, thus casting doubt in certain close results).

The tabulators facilitated the vote count process and it was projected that 98% of votes would be reported one hour after polls close, not accounting for mail-in ballots returned after the last day of advance voting, and close results subject to manual recount. Electronic vote tabulators contributed to significant increases in reporting speed.

An atmospheric river event struck southwestern British Columbia from October 18 to 20; rainfall was heaviest in the Lower Mainland on October 19, causing flooding in North Shore communities and Surrey, and several street and highway closures. Elections BC stated that paper ballots would be available at voting sites in the event of power outages, and that it had made BC Hydro aware of the locations of voting sites so that they can be prioritized in the event of an outage. While it was suggested that the weather could impact voter turnout, Elections BC stated that a record number of advance ballots had been cast for the election, while the last day of advance voting on October 16 had set a single-day record of 223,000 ballots cast.

== Timeline ==
Changes in seats held (2020–2024)
Seat	Before				Change		
Seat	Date	Member	Party	Reason	Date	Member	Party
Vancouver-Quilchena	February 7, 2022	Andrew Wilkinson	█ Liberal	Resigned	April 30, 2022	Kevin Falcon	█ Liberal
Surrey South	April 30, 2022	Stephanie Cadieux	█ Liberal	Resigned	September 10, 2022	Elenore Sturko	█ Liberal
Nechako Lakes	August 18, 2022	John Rustad	█ Liberal	Removed from caucus			█ Independent
Nechako Lakes	February 16, 2023	John Rustad	█ Independent	Crossed the floor			█ Conservative
Vancouver-Mount Pleasant	February 22, 2023	Melanie Mark	█ New Democratic	Resigned	June 24, 2023	Joan Phillip	█ New Democratic
Langford-Juan de Fuca	March 31, 2023	John Horgan	█ New Democratic	Resigned	June 24, 2023	Ravi Parmar	█ New Democratic
→ BC Liberals become BC United (April 12, 2023)
Abbotsford South	September 13, 2023	Bruce Banman	█ BC United	Crossed the floor			█ Conservative
Parksville-Qualicum	September 17, 2023	Adam Walker	█ New Democratic	Removed from caucus			█ Independent
Coquitlam-Maillardville	March 6, 2024	Selina Robinson	█ New Democratic	Left caucus			█ Independent
Cariboo-Chilcotin	May 31, 2024	Lorne Doerkson	█ BC United	Crossed the floor			█ Conservative
Surrey South	June 3, 2024	Elenore Sturko	█ BC United	Crossed the floor			█ Conservative
Richmond North Centre	July 29, 2024	Teresa Wat	█ BC United	Crossed the floor			█ Conservative
Delta South	September 3, 2024	Ian Paton	█ BC United	Crossed the floor to run for the BC Conservatives			█ Conservative
Kamloops-North Thompson	September 3, 2024	Peter Milobar	█ BC United	Crossed the floor to run for the BC Conservatives			█ Conservative
Surrey-White Rock	September 3, 2024	Trevor Halford	█ BC United	Crossed the floor to run for the BC Conservatives			█ Conservative

=== 2020 ===
- October 24 – The 2020 British Columbia general election is held, resulting in a majority government for the BC NDP.
- November 21 – Andrew Wilkinson steps aside for an interim leader to be selected for the BC Liberal Party.
- November 23 – Shirley Bond is selected as interim leader of the BC Liberal party.

=== 2021 ===
- February 17 – Wilkinson officially resigns, triggering a year-long leadership race.

=== 2022 ===
- February 5 – Kevin Falcon wins the 2022 British Columbia Liberal Party leadership election.
- June 28 – John Horgan announces his intention to step down as premier and as leader of the NDP.
- October 21 – David Eby is declared leader of the BC NDP in the 2022 leadership election by acclamation and becomes the premier-designate.
- November 16 – BC Liberal members approve the party's name change to "BC United".
- November 18 – Eby is sworn in as premier of British Columbia.

=== 2023 ===
- March 31 – John Rustad acclaimed as new leader in the 2023 Conservative Party of British Columbia leadership election to replace outgoing leader Trevor Bolin.
- April 12 – The BC Liberal Party officially changes its name to BC United.

=== 2024 ===
- January 31 – Sonia Furstenau (Cowichan Valley) announces that she will run in Victoria-Beacon Hill.
- February 5 – Selina Robinson is removed from cabinet and announces that she will not seek re-election as MLA for Coquitlam-Maillardville. Lisa Beare replaces her as Minister of Advanced Education.
- August 28 – Kevin Falcon announces the suspension of BC United's campaign, and endorses the Conservative Party.
- September 21 – Writ for general election dropped by the lieutenant governor, for October 19.
- September 28, 1 pm – Deadline for candidate nominations.
- October 19 – General election is held.
- October 26 to 28 – Final count is conducted. Mail-in and absentee ballots are counted. Recounts are completed in Surrey City Centre, Juan de Fuca-Malahat, and a partial recount in Kelowna Centre.
- October 28 – CBC News projects that the NDP will form government.
- November 7 to 8 – Judicial recounts held in Kelowna Centre, Surrey-Guildford, and a partial judicial recount in Prince George-Mackenzie.
- December 12 – The BC NDP and BC Greens announce the "Co-operation and Responsible Government Accord"

== Campaign ==
=== Party slogans ===
Party	Slogan
█ New Democratic	"Action For You"
█ Conservative	"Common Sense Change"
█ Green	"Putting People First"

=== New Democratic ===
On September 20, one day before the writ was dropped, the BC New Democratic Party unveiled their campaign bus in Surrey, which is home to some anticipated key ridings, marking the start of their campaign.

On September 23, the BC NDP released a video of Rustad saying he regrets receiving the "so-called [COVID-19] vaccine", as well as claiming the vaccine mandates were about population control. BC NDP leader David Eby criticized these statements, asserting that such beliefs are based on internet conspiracies and that Rustad could not be trusted on health policy.

On September 25, Eby promised his party would provide 25,000 new homes while financing 40% of the purchase price for first-time home buyers, at an annual cost of $1.29 billion. On September 27, he stated that the government would continue its focus on the use of prefabricated homes as a strategy to ease the housing crisis, with the government pre-approving designs for permits and developing skills training programs in consultation with the industry.

Following the Conservative Party's tax rebate proposal, the New Democrats announced their tax relief plan on September 29. Eby announced that $10,000 of individual income will be exempted from annual tax, adding that 90% of taxpayers would save $1,000 per year.

On October 1, Bowinn Ma, NDP candidate in North Vancouver-Lonsdale, announced the party would connect West Vancouver and Metrotown, Burnaby with a Bus Rapid Transit line, which will be entirely separated from traffic. In short term, they would also guarantee the existing R2 RapidBus would be extended from Phibbs Exchange to Metrotown.

On October 4, the NDP filed a petition with the Supreme Court of British Columbia seeking to compel Elections BC to change the name of the Conservative Party on ballot papers from "Conservative Party" to "B.C. Conservative Party", on the grounds that Rustad was "pretending to be part of the federal Conservative Party". A court ruling in favour of the NDP would require all ballot papers to be reprinted.

=== Conservative ===
On September 21, John Rustad chose to kick off the campaign in CRAB Park, a homeless encampment near Vancouver's Downtown Eastside. In his speech, he emphasized the severity of the addiction issue, as well as the importance of removing the carbon tax and investing in healthcare.

On September 22, Rustad announced that he would close all safe injection sites in the province, and replace them with mental health and addictions treatment centres. He referred to the sites as "drug dens", and pledged to end the decriminalization and safe supply policy introduced by the NDP government. In response, NDP leader David Eby and Green leader Sonia Furstenau both condemned the platform, pointing out the closure of safe injection sites would push the drug addicts back on streets. The following day, Elenore Sturko clarified that the party did not plan to immediately close all of the safe injection sites at once as implicated by Rustad, but transition them to treatment centres gradually. Sturko stated that "this is about transitioning people, not medicating them", and that "we need to make sure the model is supported medically".

On September 23, Rustad revealed the Conservatives' plan for tax rebates to alleviate high housing costs, which he claimed would be the greatest tax cut in BC history. The rebate would allow renters and homeowners with mortgage to exempt up to $3,000 per month from their provincial income tax. The program would start in 2026, where the exemption would begin with $1,500 per month, costing $900 million for the first year. The exemption amount would increase by $500 each year, and the final annual cost would be at $3.5 billion.

On September 25, Sturko requested an investigation by the Registrar of Lobbyists for BC against Ravi Kahlon, the incumbent Minister of Housing. She alleged the minister might be involved in a conflict of interest as his sister Parm Kahlon owns a government relations firm, where a client of the firm would be a potential partner in housing projects. Kahlon has refuted the allegation and defended that the housing company does not do work with the government.

On September 27, Rustad announced the housing platform for the Conservative Party. He committed to set deadlines for municipalities to issue rezoning, development and building permits. He also intended to repeal the BC's Step Code policy and Net-Zero mandate, which he claimed to have driven the construction cost up by 30–40%. On top of the NDP's transit-oriented policy, Rustad further assured they will amend the bill to require grocery stores and small businesses to be within walking distance of homes.

On September 28, a few hours before the candidate nomination deadline, David Eby issued an open letter requesting that Rustad to drop candidates which he considered to have "dangerous and extremist views". Eby singled out five candidates who had perpetuated conspiracy theories regarding the results of the 2020 United States presidential election, Sheldon Clare for comparing gun control to Japanese internment camps, and Bryan Breguet for his "bigoted and sexist views". Rustad declined, and suggested in a reply that Eby investigate Ravi Kahlon. The party released its agricultural plan the same day, including investments in agricultural development, financial support for yield-increasing measures and expanding the Buy BC program. Rustad also promised to review the Agricultural Land Commission.

On October 14, the Conservative Party released their education plan, including ending the SOGI 123 program (a program of materials related to gender identity and sexual orientation, which Rustad considered to be indoctrination of children), reintroducing letter grades for grades 4 to 9, and reinstating provincial standardized tests for grades 10 and 12.

During a speech to his supporters on election night, Rustad pledged to make it "as difficult as possible" for the NDP if they formed a minority government, in order to prevent "any more destruction in the province".

=== Green ===
On October 8, following the televised debate, American actor Mark Ruffalo endorsed the Green Party.

== Candidates ==
=== Candidates by party ===
Party	Leader	Candidates
New Democratic	David Eby	93
Conservative	John Rustad	93
Green	Sonia Furstenau	69
Independent / Unaffiliated (Note: 40 of them are standing as Independent, 14 of them as unaffiliated, and they are contesting in 42 ridings.)		54
Freedom	Amrit Birring	5
Libertarian	Alex Joehl	4
Communist	Kimball Cariou	3
Christian Heritage	Rod Taylor	2

Candidate contests
Candidates nominated	Constituencies	Party									
Candidates nominated	Constituencies	NDP	Con	Grn	Ind	Un	Free	Ltn	Comm	CHP	Totals
2	10	10	10								20
3	42	42	42	32	6	2	1	1			126
4	30	30	30	28	18	6	2	2	2	2	120
5	9	9	9	7	13	4	2		1		45
6	2	2	2	2	3	2		1			12
Total	93	93	93	69	40	14	5	4	3	2	323

Shelly Jan, an unaffiliated candidate in Langley-Abbotsford, withdrew after nominations were closed, but not in time to have her name removed from the printed ballots. (Note: "Shelly Jan has withdrawn as a candidate in Langley-Abbotsford...Ballot printing for the election began on September 29 and is now complete. As a result, Shelly Jan will appear on the ballot for Langley-Abbotsford.") Carlos Suarez Rubio (Langley-Walnut Grove), initially classified as unaffiliated, was later designated as an independent candidate on the ballot.

== Results ==
Final count result

On October 20 at 14:30, PDT, Elections BC completed the initial count. This count included votes cast at district electoral offices, at advance voting and on Final Voting Day. It also includes vote-by-mail ballots that were returned by mail before the end of advance voting. The remaining votes were counted during Final count, which concluded on October 28. As a result of the remaining ballots counted, the Surrey-Guildford district flipped from Conservative to NDP, resulting in a narrow NDP majority. Shortly after the final count was concluded, Lieutenant Governor Janet Austin invited David Eby to continue as Premier of British Columbia.

Judicial recounts were conducted in two electoral districts:

- Kelowna Centre
- Surrey-Guildford

A third recount was ordered in Prince George-Mackenzie, following the discovery of an uncounted ballot box containing around 861 votes. Eleven tabulator tapes were also found to have been missed, affecting the results in six districts.

The final results were not affected by these recounts since no seat was flipped. This was widely anticipated, as in the 21st century only one recount has resulted in a seat change, being that of West Vancouver-Sea to Sky in 2020.

The 2024 election was significant for several reasons:

- This was the first time since 1975 that the Conservative Party won seats.
- It was also the first general election in British Columbia, as well as any other Canadian province or territory, to elect more women than men, with 49 of 93 (52%) female MLAs. (Note: The 19th Northwest Territories Legislative Assembly had achieved a majority of women MLAs in 2021, but only after a by-election.)
- The province has not experienced such a delay in determining the eventual winner since 1952.

Final count results
Party	Leader	Candidates	Votes				Seats		
Party	Leader	Candidates	#	±	%	Change (pp)	2020	2024	±
New Democratic	David Eby	93	944,463	46,079▲	44.86	-2.83	57	47 / 93	10▼
Conservative	John Rustad	93	911,142	875,240▲	43.28	41.37	–	44 / 93	44▲
Green	Sonia Furstenau	69	174,393	110,658▼	8.24	-6.85	2	2 / 93	Steady
Independent/No affiliation		54	72,583	58,765▲	3.45	3.12			
BC United	Kevin Falcon	→ BC Liberals became BC United (April 12, 2023); Withdrew from the campaign (August 28, 2024)				-33.77	28	0 / 93	28▼
Libertarian	Alex Joehl	4	1,380	6,980▼	0.07	-0.37			
Freedom	Amrit Birring	5	1,267	1,267▲	0.04	New			
Communist	Kimball Cariou	3	639	147▼	0.03	-0.01			
Christian Heritage	Rod Taylor	2	365	3,530▼	0.02	-0.19			
Total		323	2,105,332		100.00%				
Blank and invalid votes			2,506	12,415▼					
Turnout			2,109,658	211,105▲	58.45%	4.68▲			
Registered voters			3,609,288	123,430▲					

=== Synopsis of results ===
2024 British Columbia general election – synopsis of riding results
Riding	Winning party								Turnout (Note: Including spoiled ballots)	Votes (Note: Minor political parties receiving less than 1% of the popular vote are aggregated under Other)					
Riding	2020	1st place	Votes	Share	Margin #	Margin %	2nd place (Note: Ind = Independent candidate; Un = No affiliation.)	3rd place	Turnout	NDP	Con.	Green	Ind	Other	Total
Abbotsford South	Lib	Con	13,053	61.61%	5,599	26.43%	NDP	Ind	51.72%	7,454	13,053	–	681	–	21,188
Abbotsford West	Lib	Con	11,483	58.35%	4,228	21.49%	NDP	Ind	52.14%	7,255	11,483	–	940	–	19,678
Abbotsford-Mission	NDP	Con	13,523	55.38%	2,629	10.77%	NDP	None	57.42%	10,894	13,523	–	–	–	24,417
Boundary-Similkameen	NDP	Con	11,935	48.39%	1,438	5.83%	NDP	Green	62.74%	10,497	11,935	1,454	779	–	24,665
Bulkley Valley-Stikine	NDP	Con	4,992	52.31%	1,283	13.44%	NDP	Green	64.24%	3,709	4,992	604	–	239	9,544
Burnaby Centre	New	NDP	9,780	57.28%	2,486	14.56%	Con	None	50.11%	9,780	7,294	–	–	–	17,074
Burnaby East	NDP	NDP	10,490	51.85%	2,292	11.33%	Con	Green	54.95%	10,490	8,198	1,544	–	–	20,232
Burnaby North	NDP	NDP	10,724	53.26%	2,066	10.26%	Con	Ind	53.42%	10,724	8,658	–	754	–	20,136
Burnaby South-Metrotown	New	NDP	7,560	49.33%	1,182	7.74%	Con	Green	48.85%	7,560	6,373	960	432	–	15,325
Burnaby-New Westminster	New	NDP	10,647	59.99%	4,486	25.28%	Con	Ind	51.26%	10,647	6,161	–	940	–	17,748
Cariboo-Chilcotin	Lib	Con	13,714	69.59%	7,722	39.19%	NDP	None	60.04%	5,992	13,714	–	–	–	19,706
Chilliwack North	NDP	Con	11,776	54.58%	3,651	16.92%	NDP	Green	55.07%	8,125	11,776	1,187	487	–	21,575
Chilliwack-Cultus Lake	NDP	Con	13,656	54.58%	2,290	9.15%	NDP	None	60.37%	11,366	13,656	–	–	–	25,022
Columbia River-Revelstoke	Lib	Con	8,768	47.92%	670	3.66%	NDP	Green	58.46%	8,098	8,768	1,430	–	–	18,295
Coquitlam-Burke Mountain	NDP	NDP	11,020	50.85%	368	1.70%	Con	None	54.69%	11,020	10,652	–	–	–	21,672
Coquitlam-Maillardville	NDP	NDP	11,972	51.80%	2,826	12.23%	Con	Green	56.90%	11,972	9,146	1,461	535	–	23,114
Courtenay-Comox	NDP	Con	13,481	38.83%	93	0.27%	NDP	Green	68.71%	13,388	13,481	7,202	647	–	34,718
Cowichan Valley	Green	NDP	11,795	40.51%	849	2.92%	Con	Green	63.52%	11,795	10,946	5,773	604	–	29,118
Delta North	NDP	NDP	10,988	52.73%	2,607	12.51%	Con	Green	57.89%	10,988	8,381	1,292	–	177	20,838
Delta South	Lib	Con	14,491	55.07%	2,669	10.14%	NDP	None	65.04%	11,822	14,491	–	–	–	26,313
Esquimalt-Colwood	New	NDP	15,238	51.47%	6,586	22.25%	Con	Green	63.34%	15,238	8,652	5,716	–	–	29,606
Fraser-Nicola	Lib	Con	10,326	54.34%	3,409	17.94%	NDP	Green	56.74%	6,917	10,326	1,761	–	–	19,004
Juan de Fuca-Malahat	New	NDP	9,308	38.79%	141	0.59%	Con	Green	64.81%	9,308	9,167	5,522	–	–	23,997
Kamloops Centre	New	Con	12,372	48.83%	2,003	7.91%	NDP	Green	57.59%	10,369	12,372	2,597	–	–	25,338
Kamloops-North Thompson	New	Con	17,930	59.74%	8,056	26.84%	NDP	Green	61.86%	9,874	17,930	2,209	–	–	30,013
Kelowna Centre	New	Con	11,033	42.85%	40	0.16%	NDP	Un	56.49%	10,993	11,033	1,111	2,613	–	25,750
Kelowna-Lake Country-Coldstream	New	Con	14,303	53.92%	4,953	18.67%	NDP	Ind	58.25%	9,350	14,303	1,151	1,724	–	26,528
Kelowna-Mission	Lib	Con	14,071	51.49%	5,158	18.87%	NDP	Un	60.00%	8,913	14,071	1,349	2,996	–	27,329
Kootenay Central	NDP	NDP	8,716	39.63%	1,749	7.95%	Con	Green	64.28%	8,716	6,967	4,123	2,190	–	21,996
Kootenay-Monashee	NDP	NDP	10,202	52.04%	2,586	13.19%	Con	Green	60.02%	10,202	7,616	1,785	–	–	19,603
Kootenay-Rockies	Lib	Con	8,217	42.71%	2,373	12.34%	Ind	NDP	60.79%	4,184	8,217	996	5,844	–	19,241
Ladysmith-Oceanside	New	NDP	14,144	41.49%	2,047	6.00%	Con	Ind	69.08%	14,144	12,097	2,292	5,559	–	34,092
Langford-Highlands	New	NDP	11,444	51.87%	3,193	14.47%	Con	Green	59.08%	11,444	8,251	2,368	–	–	22,063
Langley-Abbotsford	New	Con	14,341	55.65%	5,650	21.92%	NDP	Green	59.46%	8,691	14,341	1,434	1,104	200	25,770
Langley-Walnut Grove	New	Con	12,121	49.56%	1,172	4.79%	NDP	Green	58.00%	10,949	12,121	1,254	134	–	24,458
Langley-Willowbrook	New	Con	10,979	48.24%	867	3.81%	NDP	Green	55.44%	10,112	10,979	1,670	–	–	22,761
Maple Ridge East	NDP	Con	12,058	47.02%	97	0.38%	NDP	Green	57.95%	11,961	12,058	1,626	–	–	25,645
Maple Ridge-Pitt Meadows	NDP	NDP	14,480	54.89%	2,579	9.78%	Con	None	59.03%	14,480	11,901	–	–	–	26,381
Mid Island-Pacific Rim	NDP	NDP	14,042	48.74%	2,676	9.29%	Con	Green	60.37%	14,042	11,366	3,402	–	–	28,810
Nanaimo-Gabriola Island	New	NDP	14,663	52.75%	5,030	18.09%	Con	Green	59.96%	14,663	9,633	3,502	–	–	27,798
Nanaimo-Lantzville	New	NDP	15,307	51.75%	3,620	12.24%	Con	Green	66.00%	15,307	11,687	2,586	–	–	29,580
Nechako Lakes	Lib	Con	7,851	67.45%	4,684	40.24%	NDP	Green	63.37%	3,167	7,851	622	–	–	11,640
New Westminster-Coquitlam	New	NDP	12,757	59.13%	6,319	29.29%	Con	Green	54.05%	12,757	6,438	2,380	–	–	21,575
North Coast-Haida Gwaii	NDP	NDP	4,863	64.92%	2,235	29.84%	Con	None	48.60%	4,863	2,628	–	–	–	7,491
North Island	NDP	Con	14,100	47.07%	639	2.14%	NDP	Green	62.15%	13,461	14,100	2,397	–	–	29,958
North Vancouver-Lonsdale	NDP	NDP	16,759	64.88%	7,686	29.75%	Con	None	58.91%	16,759	9,073	–	–	–	25,832
North Vancouver-Seymour	NDP	NDP	16,210	52.77%	5,215	16.98%	Con	Ind	66.64%	16,210	10,995	1,722	1,794	–	30,721
Oak Bay-Gordon Head	NDP	NDP	14,519	49.10%	5,977	20.21%	Con	Green	69.80%	14,519	8,542	6,509	–	–	29,570
Peace River North	Lib	Con	11,213	74.36%	8,175	54.21%	Ind	NDP	57.16%	828	11,213	–	3,038	–	15,079
Peace River South	Lib	Con	7,182	69.84%	4,657	45.29%	Un	NDP	56.56%	576	7,182	–	2,525	–	10,283
Penticton-Summerland	Lib	Con	11,615	41.37%	317	1.13%	NDP	Un	61.49%	11,298	11,615	1,472	3,691	–	28,076
Port Coquitlam	NDP	NDP	13,843	53.87%	3,876	15.08%	Con	Green	57.70%	13,843	9,967	1,644	–	244	25,698
Port Moody-Burquitlam	NDP	NDP	13,488	52.06%	2,995	11.56%	Con	Green	58.72%	13,488	10,493	1,927	–	–	25,908
Powell River-Sunshine Coast	NDP	NDP	14,474	49.62%	4,065	13.94%	Con	Green	66.35%	14,474	10,409	3,932	356	–	29,171
Prince George-Mackenzie	Lib	Con	11,307	60.92%	6,065	32.68%	NDP	Green	59.50%	5,242	11,307	1,576	435	–	18,560
Prince George-North Cariboo	Lib	Con	11,430	56.82%	7,036	34.98%	Ind	NDP	59.97%	3,426	11,430	866	4,394	–	20,116
Prince George-Valemount	Lib	Con	9,018	55.19%	3,309	20.25%	NDP	Green	53.60%	5,709	9,018	1,612	–	–	16,339
Richmond Centre	NDP	Con	8,426	51.99%	2,465	15.21%	NDP	Un	49.07%	5,961	8,426	–	1,821	–	16,208
Richmond-Bridgeport	Lib	Con	9,908	58.19%	3,987	23.42%	NDP	Green	48.63%	5,921	9,908	547	651	–	17,027
Richmond-Queensborough	NDP	Con	10,052	50.91%	1,338	6.78%	NDP	Ind	53.01%	8,713	10,052	–	979	–	19,744
Richmond-Steveston	NDP	NDP	10,332	44.27%	484	2.07%	Con	Un	59.87%	10,332	9,848	803	2,354	–	23,337
Saanich North and the Islands	Green	Green	12,308	36.15%	1,349	3.96%	NDP	Con	68.95%	10,958	10,145	12,308	635	–	34,046
Saanich South	NDP	NDP	15,338	49.76%	5,335	17.31%	Con	Green	67.62%	15,338	10,003	5,485	–	–	30,826
Salmon Arm-Shuswap	Lib	Con	16,566	52.11%	6,888	21.67%	NDP	Ind	61.42%	9,677	16,566	2,250	3,295	–	31,788
Skeena	Lib	Con	6,243	51.20%	824	6.76%	NDP	Green	55.82%	5,419	6,243	406	–	126	12,194
Surrey City Centre	New	NDP	6,727	46.71%	236	1.64%	Con	Green	44.82%	6,727	6,491	878	160	147	14,403
Surrey North	New	Con	7,954	50.67%	1,160	7.39%	NDP	Green	49.92%	6,794	7,954	662	125	162	15,697
Surrey South	Lib	Con	13,056	58.83%	3,920	17.66%	NDP	None	56.29%	9,136	13,056	–	–	–	22,192
Surrey-Cloverdale	NDP	Con	10,268	48.32%	587	2.77%	NDP	Green	55.87%	9,681	10,268	1,150	–	153	21,252
Surrey-Fleetwood	NDP	NDP	9,923	48.60%	751	3.67%	Con	Green	54.14%	9,923	9,172	1,321	–	–	20,416
Surrey-Guildford	NDP	NDP	8,947	46.93%	22	0.12%	Con	Green	50.76%	8,947	8,925	824	370	–	19,066
Surrey-Newton	NDP	NDP	7,924	51.17%	1,266	8.18%	Con	Free	50.81%	7,924	6,658	–	533	371	15,486
Surrey-Panorama	NDP	Con	8,735	49.60%	263	1.49%	NDP	Free	53.91%	8,472	8,735	–	–	404	17,611
Surrey-Serpentine River	New	Con	9,782	49.70%	435	2.21%	NDP	Ind	54.49%	9,347	9,782	–	554	–	19,683
Surrey-White Rock	Lib	Con	14,667	52.31%	1,968	7.02%	NDP	Ltn	61.90%	12,699	14,667	–	–	671	28,037
Vancouver-Fraserview	NDP	NDP	11,896	57.18%	4,278	20.56%	Con	Green	52.42%	11,896	7,618	1,291	–	–	20,805
Vancouver-Hastings	NDP	NDP	14,237	64.15%	8,846	39.86%	Con	Green	54.01%	14,237	5,391	2,409	157	–	22,194
Vancouver-Kensington	NDP	NDP	11,713	60.90%	5,652	29.38%	Con	Green	51.57%	11,713	6,061	1,458	–	–	19,232
Vancouver-Langara	Lib	NDP	8,506	48.43%	419	2.38%	Con	Green	51.83%	8,506	8,087	969	–	–	17,562
Vancouver-Little Mountain	New	NDP	15,636	62.11%	7,931	31.50%	Con	Green	61.16%	15,636	7,705	1,833	–	–	25,174
Vancouver-Point Grey	NDP	NDP	12,538	56.77%	4,916	22.26%	Con	Green	63.43%	12,538	7,622	1,925	–	–	22,085
Vancouver-Quilchena	Lib	Con	11,464	51.58%	2,815	12.68%	NDP	Green	58.45%	8,649	11,464	1,729	385	–	22,227
Vancouver-Renfrew	NDP	NDP	10,983	63.22%	5,656	32.56%	Con	Green	48.24%	10,983	5,327	1,064	–	–	17,374
Vancouver-South Granville	New	NDP	17,208	64.31%	10,530	39.35%	Con	Green	63.82%	17,208	6,678	2,872	–	–	26,758
Vancouver-Strathcona	NDP	NDP	13,563	67.62%	10,136	50.53%	Con	Green	51.36%	13,563	3,427	2,731	–	336	20,057
Vancouver-West End	NDP	NDP	13,143	63.01%	7,466	34.79%	Con	Green	53.56%	13,143	5,677	1,893	144	–	20,857
Vancouver-Yaletown	New	NDP	9,018	49.76%	1,160	6.40%	Con	Green	50.14%	9,018	7,858	1,248	–	–	18,124
Vernon-Lumby	NDP	NDP	11,837	42.69%	476	1.72%	Con	Un	60.65%	11,837	11,361	–	4,266	265	27,729
Victoria-Beacon Hill	NDP	NDP	13,634	47.35%	3,989	13.85%	Green	Con	65.77%	13,634	5,514	9,645	–	–	28,793
Victoria-Swan Lake	NDP	NDP	14,273	56.03%	8,373	32.87%	Green	Con	62.63%	14,273	5,146	5,900	–	156	25,475
West Kelowna-Peachland	New	Con	13,475	50.85%	6,081	22.95%	NDP	Un	58.36%	7,394	13,475	–	5,630	–	26,499
West Vancouver-Capilano	Lib	Con	12,050	46.68%	5,045	19.55%	NDP	Ind	58.62%	7,005	12,050	1,435	5,326	–	25,816
West Vancouver-Sea to Sky	Lib	Green	10,438	38.08%	676	2.47%	Con	NDP	61.96%	7,212	9,762	10,438	–	–	27,412

= BC United candidates who opted to stand on other tickets
= Conservative candidates displaced on BC United candidate migration
= Retiring incumbent subsequently chose to stand again as an independent
= Open seat
= Turnout is above provincial average
= Winning candidate held seat in previous Legislature
= Ridings where BCU incumbent MLA failed to secure reelection
= Incumbent had switched allegiance
= Previously incumbent in another riding
= Not incumbent; was previously elected to the Legislature
= Incumbency arose from byelection gain
= Other incumbents renominated
= Previously an MP in the House of Commons of Canada
= Multiple candidates

=== Comparative analysis (2024 vs 2020) ===
Ternary plots of election results
2020: electoral districts won identified by NDP (orange), Liberal (red) and Green (green).

2024: electoral districts won identified by NDP (orange), Conservative (blue) and Green (green)
Strength of 1st-place finishes
2024 vs 2020

2024 (by winning party)
Strength of 2nd-place finishes
2024 vs 2020

2024 (by party finishing second)
Strength of other candidates
2024 vs 2020

2024
Marginality of election results
2024 vs 2020

2024 (by winning party)

=== Summary analysis ===
Party candidates in 2nd place
Party in 1st place	Party in 2nd place				Total
Party in 1st place	NDP	Con	Grn	Ind/Un	Total
New Democratic		45	2		47
Conservative	40			4	44
Green	1	1			2
Total	41	46	2	4	93

Principal races, according to 1st and 2nd-place results
Parties		Seats
█ New Democratic	█ Conservative	85
█ New Democratic	█ Green	3
█ Conservative	█ Ind/Un	4
█ Conservative	█ Green	1
Total		93

Candidates ranked 1st to 5th place, by party
Parties	1st	2nd	3rd	4th	5th
█ New Democratic	47	41	5		
█ Conservative	44	46	3		
█ Green	2	2	54	11	
█ Ind/Un		4	18	21	9
█ Freedom			2	3	
█ Libertarian			1	2	1
█ Communist				2	1

Resulting composition of the 43rd Parliament of British Columbia
Source		Party			
Source		NDP	Con	Grn	Total
Seats retained	Incumbents returned	22			22
Seats retained	Open seats held	9		1	10
Seats changing hands	Incumbents defeated		12	1	13
Seats changing hands	Open seats gained	2	11		13
Seats changing hands	Incumbents changing affiliation		6		6
Seats changing hands	Ouster of BCU incumbents standing as Independent/Unaffiliated		5		5
New seats	Previously incumbent - NDP	6			6
New seats	Previously incumbent - BCU		1		1
New seats	New MLAs	8	9		17
Total		47	44	2	93

== Student Vote results ==
Student Vote elections are mock elections that run parallel to real elections, in which students not of voting age participate. They are administered by CIVIX Canada, in partnership with Elections BC. Student Vote elections are for educational purposes and do not count towards the actual results.

Summary of the 2024 BC Student Vote
Party	Leader	Seats			Votes		
Party	Leader	Elected	2020	±	#	%	Change (pp)
New Democratic	David Eby	43	58	▼15	64,899	36.66	▼3.20
Conservative	John Rustad	40	1	▲39	63,973	36.13	▲33.68
Green	Sonia Furstenau	10	17	▼7	34,256	19.35	▼8.33
Independent		0	0	0	8,444	4.77	▲4.64
No Affiliation		0	0	0	2,817	1.59	▲4.64
Freedom	Amrit Birring	0	—N/a	—N/a	1,352	0.76	—N/a
Libertarian	Alex Joehl	0	0	0	752	0.42	▼1.10
Communist	Kimball Cariou	0	0	0	424	0.24	▼0.30
Christian Heritage	Rod Taylor	0	1	▼1	126	0.07	▼1.05
BC United	Kevin Falcon	0	12	▼12			
Valid votes					177,043	96.66	—N/a
Rejected ballots					6,113	3.34	—N/a
Total votes cast		93	87	▲6	183,156	100.00	—N/a
Source: Student Vote BC 2024 complete results

== Opinion polls ==
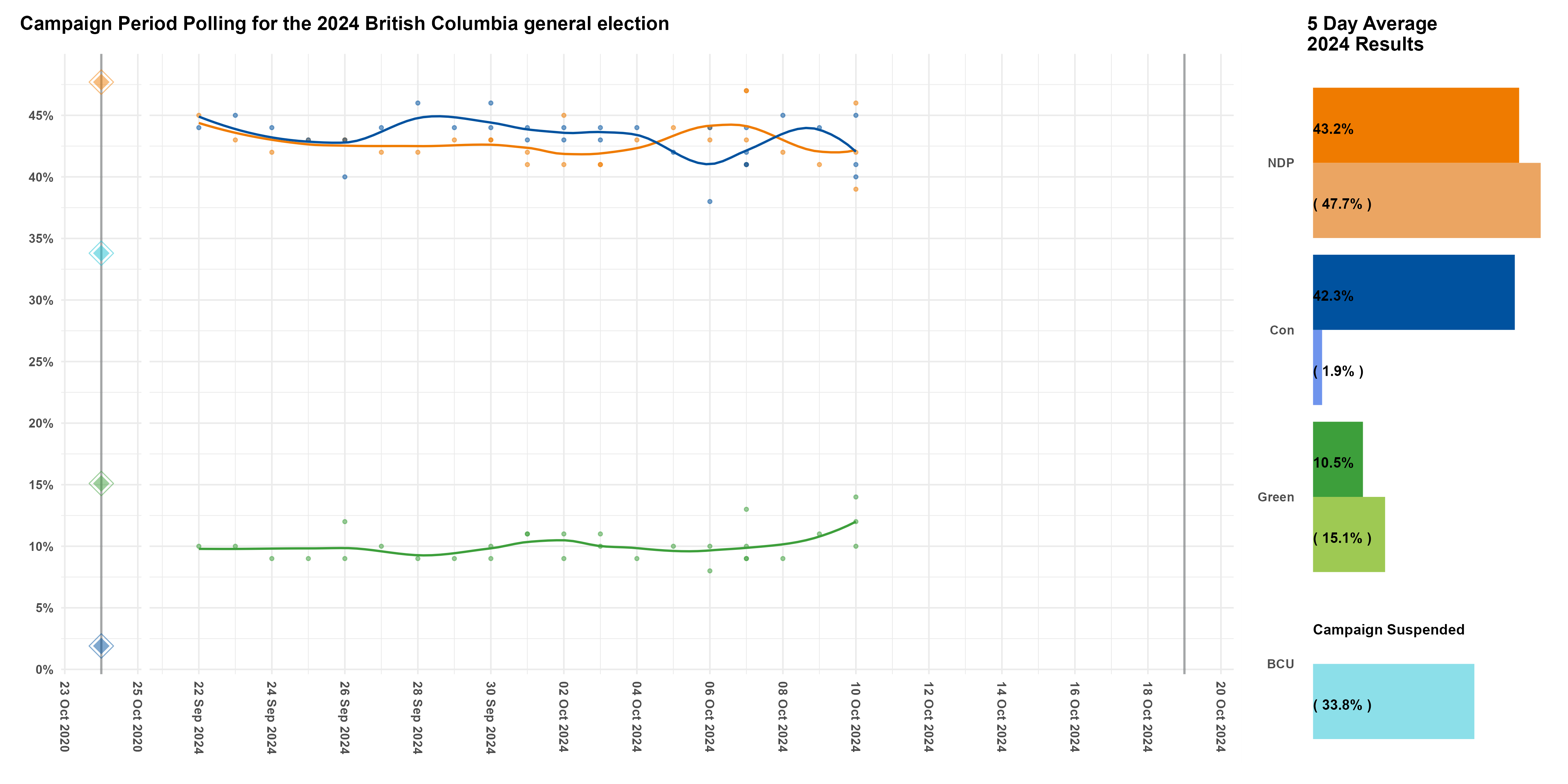
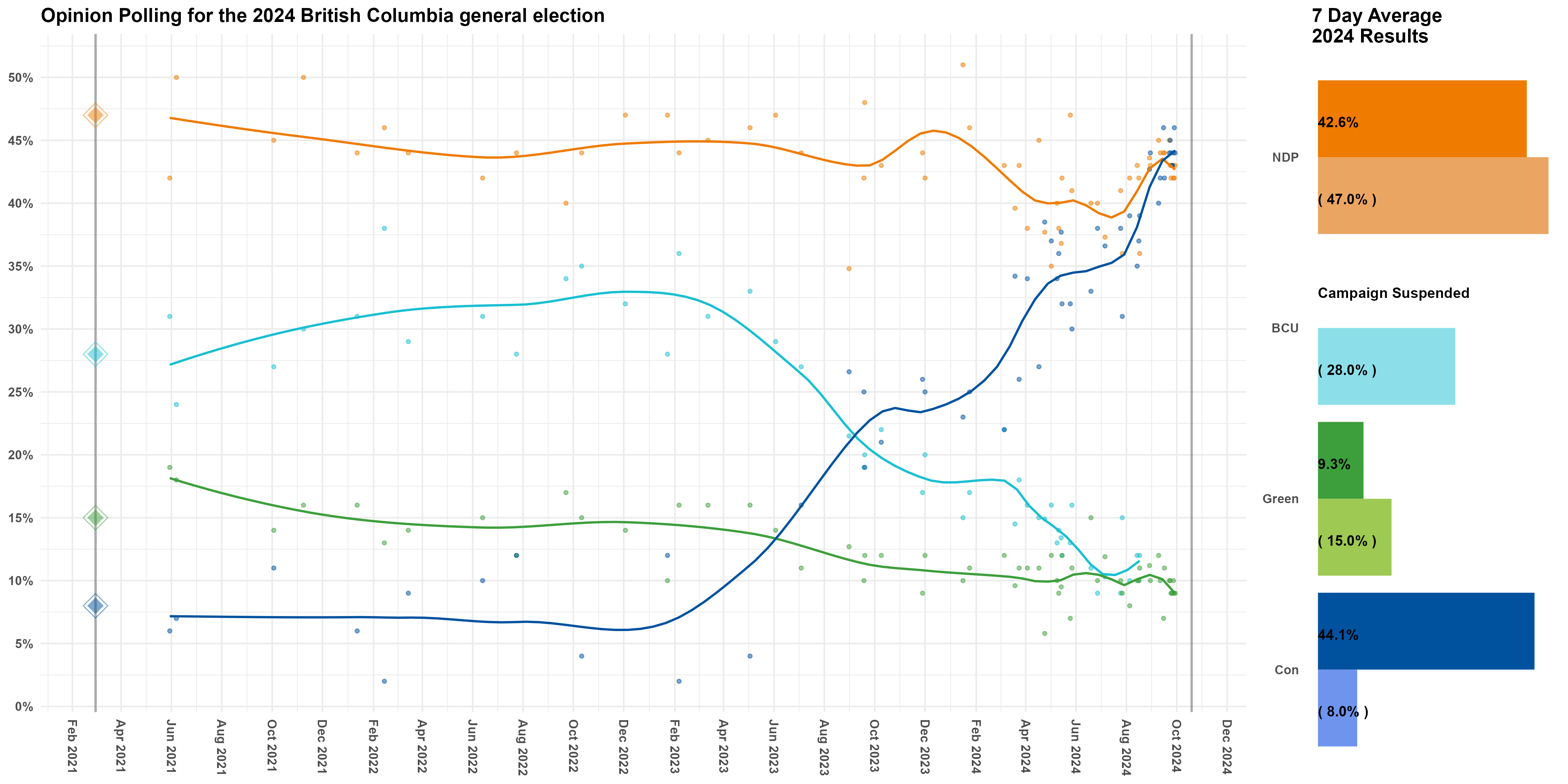

Opinion polls
Polling firm	Client	Dates conducted	Source	NDP	BCU	Green	Con.	Others	Margin of error	Sample size	Polling method	Lead
2024 general election		Oct 19, 2024	–	44.9%	—N/a	8.2%	43.3%	3.6%	–	–	–	1.6%
Research Co.	—N/a	Oct 17–18, 2024		44%	—N/a	12%	41%	3%	±3.5%	803	Online	3%
Mainstreet Research	—N/a	Oct 17–18, 2024		42%	—N/a	10%	45%	3%	±2.5%	2,064	IVR	3%
Pallas Data	—N/a	Oct 17–18, 2024		45%	—N/a	9%	42%	3%	±3.7%	712	IVR	3%
Ipsos	Global BC	Oct 16–18, 2024		44%	—N/a	11%	42%	3%	±3.1%	1,330	Online/Phone	2%
Mainstreet Research	—N/a	Oct 16–17, 2024		40%	—N/a	12%	45%	4%	±2.5%	1,651	IVR	5%
Liaison Strategies	NEPMCC	Oct 16–17, 2024		43%	—N/a	10%	45%	3%	±3.46%	803	IVR	2%
Forum Research	—N/a	Oct 15–17, 2024		42.7%	—N/a	10.8%	43.4%	3.1%	±2.2%	2,083	IVR	0.7%
Mainstreet Research	—N/a	Oct 15–16, 2024		40%	—N/a	12%	43%	5%	±2.5%	1,517	IVR	3%
Pollara	Hotel Pacifico Podcast	Oct 13–16, 2024		42%	—N/a	12%	41%	5%	—N/a	1,093	Online/IVR	1%
Leger	Vancouver Sun	Oct 14–15, 2024		46%	—N/a	9%	42%	3%	±3.1%	1,017	Online	4%
Mainstreet Research	—N/a	Oct 14–15, 2024		40%	—N/a	11%	44%	5%	±2.8%	1,220	IVR	4%
Mainstreet Research	—N/a	Oct 13–14, 2024		39%	—N/a	12%	44%	5%	±3.1%	1,038	IVR	5%
Research Co.	—N/a	Oct 12–14, 2024		45%	—N/a	11%	41%	3%	±3.5%	800	Online	4%
Spark Insights	iPolitics	Oct 9–14, 2024		42%	—N/a	12%	40%	7%	±4.9%	400	Online	2%
Pollara	Hotel Pacifico Podcast	Oct 9–14, 2024		42%	—N/a	14%	39%	5%	—N/a	1,000	Online/IVR	3%
Mainstreet Research	—N/a	Oct 12–13, 2024		40%	—N/a	10%	45%	5%	—N/a	1,303	IVR	5%
Angus Reid	—N/a	Oct 9–13, 2024		45%	—N/a	12%	40%	3%	±1.8%	2,863	Online	5%
Pallas Data	—N/a	October 12, 2024		42%	—N/a	14%	41%	4%	±3.7%	699	IVR	1%
Mainstreet Research	—N/a	Oct 11–12, 2024		40%	—N/a	10%	46%	5%	±2.8%	1,248	IVR	6%
Mainstreet Research	—N/a	Oct 10–11, 2024		40%	—N/a	10%	45%	5%	±2.7%	1,360	IVR	5%
Ipsos	Global BC	Oct 9–10, 2024		46%	—N/a	10%	41%	3%	±3.5%	1,000	Online	5%
Mainstreet Research	—N/a	Oct 9–10, 2024		39%	—N/a	12%	45%	4%	±3.2%	918	IVR	6%
Pollara	—N/a	Oct 3–10, 2024		42%	—N/a	14%	40%	4%	±2.9%	1,145	Online/IVR	2%
Mainstreet Research	—N/a	Oct 8–9, 2024		41%	—N/a	11%	44%	4%	±3.1%	1,035	IVR	3%
Pollara	Hotel Pacifico Podcast	Oct 4–7, 9, 2024		41%	—N/a	15%	40%	4%	—N/a	1,100	Online/IVR	1%
		Oct 8, 2024	Leaders debate between David Eby, John Rustad, and Sonia Furstenau									
Mainstreet Research	—N/a	Oct 7–8, 2024		42%	—N/a	9%	45%	4%	±2.9%	1,159	IVR	3%
Mainstreet Research	—N/a	Oct 6–7, 2024		43%	—N/a	9%	44%	5%	±2.9%	1,166	IVR	1%
Pollara	Hotel Pacifico Podcast	Oct 4–7, 2024		41%	—N/a	13%	41%	5%	—N/a	≈800	Online/IVR	Tie
Leger	—N/a	Oct 3–7, 2024		47%	—N/a	9%	42%	2%	±3.1%	1,002	Online	5%
Counsel Public Affairs	BC Chamber of Commerce	Oct 1–7, 2024		47%	—N/a	10%	41%	2%	±2%	2,009	Online	6%
Fairview Strategy	—N/a	Oct 4–6, 2024		44%	—N/a	10%	38%	—N/a	±3.4%	806	Online	6%
Mainstreet Research	—N/a	Oct 4–6, 2024		43%	—N/a	8%	44%	5%	±2.9%	1,192	IVR	1%
Mainstreet Research	—N/a	Oct 3–5, 2024		44%	—N/a	10%	42%	4%	±2.8%	1,277	IVR	2%
Mainstreet Research	—N/a	Oct 2–4, 2024		43%	—N/a	9%	44%	4%	±2.8%	1,279	IVR	1%
Pollara	Hotel Pacifico Podcast	Oct 2–3, 2024		41%	—N/a	10%	43%	5%	—N/a	≈400	Online/IVR	2%
Mainstreet Research	—N/a	Oct 1–3, 2024		41%	—N/a	11%	44%	5%	±2.8%	1,241	IVR	3%
Research Co.	—N/a	Sep 30 – Oct 2, 2024		45%	—N/a	9%	44%	2%	±3.5%	801	Online	1%
Mainstreet Research	—N/a	Sep 30 – Oct 2, 2024		41%	—N/a	11%	43%	5%	±2.8%	1,247	IVR	2%
Mainstreet Research	—N/a	Sep 29 – Oct 1, 2024		42%	—N/a	11%	43%	5%	±2.6%	1,259	IVR	1%
Pollara	Hotel Pacifico Podcast	Sep 27 – Oct 1, 2024		41%	—N/a	11%	44%	5%	—N/a	≈1,000	Online/IVR	3%
Mainstreet Research	—N/a	Sep 28–30, 2024		43%	—N/a	9%	44%	4%	±2.6%	1,331	IVR	1%
Leger	—N/a	Sep 27–30, 2024		43%	—N/a	10%	46%	2%	±3.1%	1,002	Online	3%
Mainstreet Research	—N/a	Sep 27–29, 2024		43%	—N/a	9%	44%	4%	±2.6%	1,331	IVR	1%
Mainstreet Research	—N/a	Sep 26–28, 2024		42%	—N/a	9%	46%	4%	±2.6%	1,302	IVR	4%
Mainstreet Research	—N/a	Sep 25–27, 2024		42%	—N/a	10%	44%	5%	±2.6%	1,247	IVR	2%
Mainstreet Research	—N/a	Sep 24–26, 2024		43%	—N/a	9%	43%	5%	±2.4%	1,651	IVR	Tie
Pollara	Hotel Pacifico Podcast	Sep 21–26, 2024		43%	—N/a	12%	40%	5%	—N/a	1,032	Online/IVR	3%
Mainstreet Research	—N/a	Sep 23–25, 2024		43%	—N/a	9%	43%	5%	±2.2%	2,065	IVR	Tie
Mainstreet Research	—N/a	Sep 23–24, 2024		42%	—N/a	9%	44%	5%	±2.4%	1,474	IVR	2%
Leger	—N/a	Sep 20–23, 2024		43%	—N/a	10%	45%	2%	±3.1%	1,001	Online	2%
Angus Reid	—N/a	Sep 20–22, 2024		45%	—N/a	10%	44%	2%	±3%	1,215	Online	1%
Leger	—N/a	Sep 13–16, 2024		44%	—N/a	11%	42%	3%	±3.1%	1,001	Online	2%
Mainstreet Research	—N/a	Sep 13–15, 2024		44%	—N/a	7%	46%	3%	±3.3%	877	IVR	2%
Research Co.	—N/a	Sep 09–11, 2024		44%	—N/a	10%	42%	3%	±3.5%	802	Online	2%
Counsel Public Affairs	B.C. Chamber of Commerce	Sep 4–9, 2024		45%	—N/a	12%	40%	3%	±2%	2,008	Online	5%
Angus Reid	—N/a	Aug 28–30, 2024		43%	—N/a	10%	44%	3%	±3%	1,049	Online	1%
Pallas Data	—N/a	Aug 29, 2024		43.6%	—N/a	11.2%	42.7%	2.5%	±3.4%	821	IVR	0.9%
		Aug 28, 2024	BC United suspends election campaign, formally endorses BC Conservatives									
Mainstreet Research	—N/a	Aug 15–17, 2024		36%	12%	11%	39%	2%	±3.2%	962	IVR	3%
Abacus Data	—N/a	Aug 14–16, 2024		42%	10%	10%	37%	1%	±3.1%	1,000	Online	5%
Counsel Public Affairs	B.C. Chamber of Commerce	Aug 6–14, 2024		43%	12%	10%	35%	1%	±2%	2,008	Online	8%
Leger	—N/a	Aug 2–5, 2024		42%	10%	8%	39%	2%	±3.1%	1,001	Online	3%
		Jul 29, 2024	BC United MLA Teresa Wat crosses the floor to the BC Conservatives.									
Sovereign North Strategies	—N/a	July 22–27, 2024		36%	15%	9%	31%	9%	±4%	775	Telephone	5%
Research Co.	—N/a	July 23–25, 2024		41%	9%	10%	38%	2%	±3.5%	801	Online	3%
Mainstreet Research	—N/a	July 4–6, 2024		37.3%	10.3%	11.9%	36.6%	3.8%	±3%	1,048	IVR	0.7%
Pollara	—N/a	June 2024		40%	9%	9%	41%	1%	—N/a	—N/a	Online	1%
Liaison Strategies	—N/a	June 26–27, 2024		40%	9%	10%	38%	3%	±2.96%	1,097	IVR	2%
Research Co.	—N/a	June 17–19, 2024		40%	11%	15%	33%	2%	±3.5%	800	Online	7%
		Jun 3, 2024	BC United MLA Elenore Sturko crosses the floor to the BC Conservatives.									
		May 31, 2024	BC United MLA and caucus chair Lorne Doerkson crosses the floor to the BC Conservatives.									
Angus Reid	—N/a	May 24–27, 2024		41%	16%	11%	30%	1%	±3%	1,203	Online	11%
Navigator Ltd.	—N/a	May 21–25, 2024		47%	13%	7%	32%	1%	±3.1%	1,000	Online	15%
Research Co.	—N/a	May 13–15, 2024		42%	12%	12%	32%	2%	±3.5%	800	Online	10%
Pallas Data	—N/a	May 14, 2024		36.8%	13.4%	9.5%	37.7%	2.6%	±3.4%	808	IVR	0.9%
Mainstreet Research	—N/a	May 8–11, 2024		38%	14%	9%	36%	3%	±3.1%	935	IVR	2%
Abacus Data	—N/a	May 6–9, 2024		40%	13%	10%	34%	2%	±3.1%	1,000	Online	6%
Yorkville Strategies	—N/a	Apr 26 – May 2, 2024		35%	16%	12%	37%	—N/a	±3.9%	618	Telephone	2%
Mainstreet Research	—N/a	Apr 23–24, 2024		37.7%	14.9%	5.8%	38.5%	3.2%	±3.2%	507	IVR	0.8%
Research Co.	—N/a	Apr 15–17, 2024		45%	15%	11%	27%	1%	±3.5%	801	Online	18%
Liaison Strategies	—N/a	Apr 2–3, 2024		38%	16%	11%	34%	2%	±2.94%	1,105	IVR	4%
Leger	—N/a	Mar 22–24, 2024		43%	18%	11%	26%	2%	±3.1%	1,002	Online	17%
Mainstreet Research	—N/a	Mar 18–19, 2024		39.6%	14.5%	9.6%	34.2%	2.1%	±3%	1,063	IVR	5.4%
Angus Reid	—N/a	Feb 28 – Mar 6, 2024		43%	22%	12%	22%	1%	±3%	682	Online	21%
Research Co.	—N/a	January 22–24, 2024		46%	17%	11%	25%	2%	±3.5%	800	Online	21%
Pollara	—N/a	January 8–16, 2024		51%	15%	10%	23%	1%	±2.2%	1,512	Online	28%
Angus Reid	—N/a	Nov 24 – Dec 1, 2023		42%	20%	12%	25%	1%	±4%	487	Online	17%
Abacus Data	—N/a	Nov 22–28, 2023		44%	17%	9%	26%	3%	±3.1%	1,000	Online	18%
Angus Reid	—N/a	Oct 2–9, 2023		43%	22%	12%	21%	1%	±2.5%	714	Online	21%
Research Co.	—N/a	Sep 17–19, 2023		48%	20%	12%	19%	1%	±3.5%	800	Online	28%
Leger	—N/a	Sep 15–18, 2023		42%	19%	10%	25%	3%	±3.1%	1,001	Online	17%
		Sep 13, 2023	BC United MLA Bruce Banman crosses the floor to the BC Conservatives.									
Mainstreet Research	—N/a	Aug 29–31, 2023		34.8%	21.5%	12.7%	26.6%	4.3%	±4%	601	IVR	8.2%
Leger	Postmedia News	Jun 30 – Jul 4, 2023		44%	27%	11%	16%	3%	±3.1%	1,000	Online	17%
		Jun 24, 2023	By-elections are held in Vancouver-Mount Pleasant and Langford-Juan de Fuca.									
Angus Reid	—N/a	May 30 – Jun 3, 2023		47%	29%	14%	—N/a	10%	—N/a	385	Online	18%
Research Co.	—N/a	May 1–3, 2023		46%	33%	16%	4%	1%	±3.5%	800	Online	13%
		Apr 12, 2023	BC Liberals change their party name to BC United.									
		Mar 31, 2023	John Rustad is acclaimed as leader of the BC Conservatives.									
Angus Reid	—N/a	Mar 6–13, 2023		45%	31%	16%	—N/a	8%	±4.0%	641	Online	14%
		Mar 3, 2023	Trevor Bolin announces that he will be stepping down as leader of the BC Conservatives.									
		Feb 16, 2023	John Rustad joins the BC Conservatives, giving the party its only MLA.									
Research Co.	—N/a	Feb 4–6, 2023		44%	36%	16%	2%	2%	±3.5%	800	Online	8%
Leger	Postmedia News	Jan 20–23, 2023		47%	28%	10%	12%	3%	±3.1%	1,003	Online	19%
Angus Reid	—N/a	Nov 28 – Dec 3, 2022		47%	32%	14%	—N/a	7%	±4.0%	658	Online	15%
		Oct 21 – Nov 18, 2022	David Eby becomes NDP leader and premier of British Columbia. BC Liberal members approve name change to "BC United".									
Research Co.	—N/a	Oct 9–11, 2022		44%	35%	15%	4%	1%	±3.5%	800	Online	9%
Angus Reid	—N/a	Q3 2022		42%	29%	13%	14%	1%	—N/a	—N/a	Online	13%
Angus Reid	—N/a	Sep 19–22, 2022		40%	34%	17%	—N/a	9%	±3.0%	656	Online	6%
Leger	Postmedia News	Jul 22–24, 2022		44%	28%	12%	12%	4%	—N/a	1,000	Online	16%
		Jun 28, 2022	John Horgan announces his intention to resign as premier of British Columbia and leader of the NDP.									
Angus Reid	—N/a	Jun 7–13, 2022		42%	31%	15%	10%	2%	±4.0%	615	Online	11%
Angus Reid	—N/a	Mar 10–15, 2022		44%	29%	14%	9%	3%	±4.0%	604	Online	15%
Research Co.	—N/a	Feb 12–14, 2022		46%	38%	13%	2%	1%	±3.5%	800	Online	8%
		Feb 5, 2022	Kevin Falcon is elected leader of the BC Liberals									
Angus Reid	—N/a	Jan 7–12, 2022		44%	31%	16%	6%	3%	±4.0%	522	Online	13%
Stratcom	—N/a	Nov 2–8, 2021		50%	30%	16%	—N/a	4%	—N/a	803	IVR	20%
Angus Reid	—N/a	Sep 29 – Oct 3, 2021		45%	27%	14%	11%	2%	±4.0%	448	Online	18%
Angus Reid	—N/a	Jun 2–7, 2021		50%	24%	18%	7%	2%	±4.0%	448	Online	26%
Insights West	—N/a	May 26–30, 2021	(Note: "Government of British Columbia Report Card — May 2021". June 2021.)	42%	31%	19%	6%	2%	±3.4%	831	Online	11%
Angus Reid	—N/a	Mar 2021		47%	28%	15%	8%	1%	—N/a	—N/a	Online	19%
Angus Reid	—N/a	Nov 24–30, 2020		48%	26%	14%	11%	1%	±1.4%	551	Online	22%
		Nov 23, 2020	Shirley Bond becomes the interim leader of the BC Liberals									
		Nov 21, 2020	Andrew Wilkinson resigns as leader of the BC Liberals									
2020 general election		Oct 24, 2020	–	47.7%	33.8%	15.1%	1.9%	1.5%	–	–	–	13.9%

== See also ==
- 2025 Canadian federal election in British Columbia
