= Prince George-Omineca =

Defunct provincial electoral district in British Columbia, Canada

Prince George-Omineca is a defunct provincial electoral district for the Legislative Assembly of British Columbia, Canada. It existed from 1991 to 2009.

== Demographics ==
Population, 2001	39,109
Population change, 1996–2001	0.9%
Area (km^{2})	40,557
Pop. density	0.96

== Members of the Legislative Assembly ==
This riding has elected the following members of the Legislative Assembly:

Prince George-Omineca
Assembly	Years	Member	Party
Riding created from Omineca
35th	1991–1996	Len Fox	Social Credit
36th	1996–2001	Paul Nettleton	Liberal
37th	2001–2005	Paul Nettleton	Liberal
38th	2005–2009	John Rustad	Liberal
Riding dissolved into Nechako Lakes, Prince George-Mackenzie and Prince George-Valemount

== Election results ==
1991 British Columbia general election: Prince George–Omineca
Party	Candidate	Votes	%	Expenditures
Social Credit	Len Fox	6,656	52.05	$35,299
New Democratic	John Ricketts	6,131	47.95	$27,257
Total valid votes		12,787	100.00	
Total rejected ballots		730	5.40	
Turnout		13,517	70.04	
Source: Elections British Columbia

1996 British Columbia general election: Prince George–Omineca
Party	Candidate	Votes	%	Expenditures
Liberal	Paul Nettleton	5,514	36.88	$48,025
New Democratic	Chuck Fraser	5,206	34.82	$32,630
Reform	Ron Ray	2,998	20.05	$6,226
Progressive Democrat	Carole Fraser	1,023	6.84	$100
Green	Todd Edward Romaine	209	1.40	$1,515
Total valid votes		14,950	100.00	
Total rejected ballots		118	0.78	
Turnout		15,068	67.79	
Source: Elections British Columbia

2001 British Columbia general election: Prince George–Omineca
Party	Candidate	Votes	%	Expenditures
Liberal	Paul Nettleton	10,469	61.65	$58,110
New Democratic	Edward John	3,156	18.58	$22,087
Unity	Eldon Matte	1,685	9.92	$27,420
Green	David Usher	1,026	6.04	$1,144
Marijuana	Will DeWolf	646	3.81	$924
Total valid votes		16,982	100.00	
Total rejected ballots		84	0.49	
Turnout		17,066	73.70	
Source: Elections British Columbia

2005 British Columbia general election: Prince George–Omineca
Party	Candidate	Votes	%	Expenditures
Liberal	John Rustad	8,622	51.71	$87,794
New Democratic	Chuck Fraser	6,180	37.06	$64,805
Green	Andrej J. DeWolf	1,393	8.35	$2,139
Democratic Reform	Erle Martz	479	2.87	$983
Total valid votes		16,674	100	
Total rejected ballots		91	0.55	
Turnout		16,765	64.22	
Source: Elections British Columbia

== See also ==
- List of British Columbia provincial electoral districts
- Canadian provincial electoral districts
