= John Rustad =

Canadian politician (born 1963)

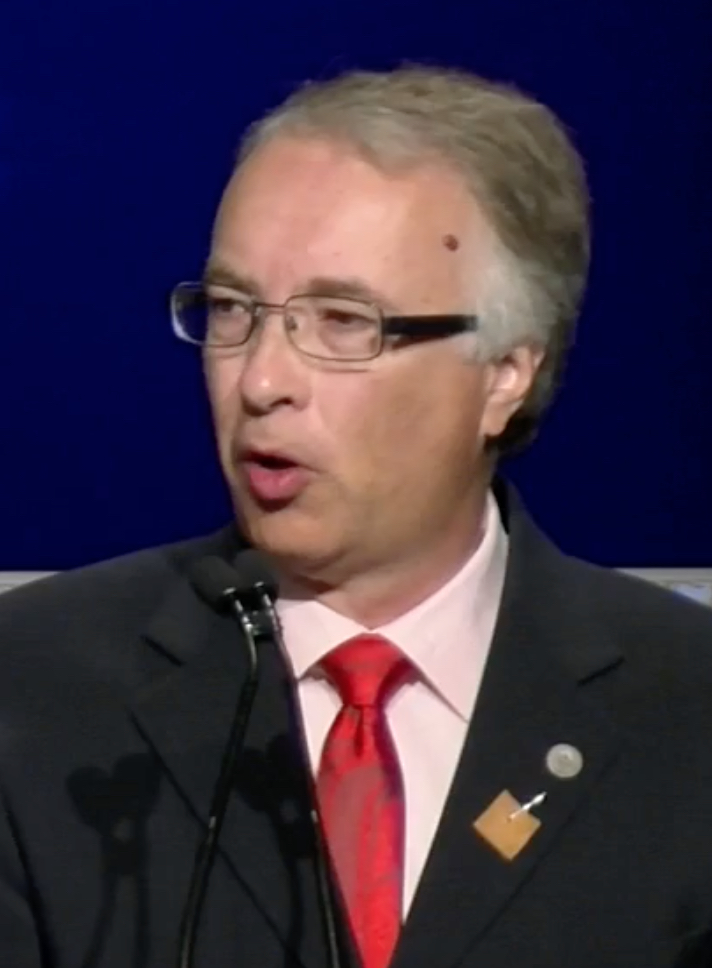
- Rustad in 2016

Leader of the Opposition of British Columbia
- In office October 19, 2024 – December 4, 2025
- Preceded by: Kevin Falcon
- Succeeded by: Trevor Halford

Leader of the Conservative Party of British Columbia
- In office March 31, 2023 – December 4, 2025
- Preceded by: Trevor Bolin
- Succeeded by: Trevor Halford (interim)
Ministerial positions
Minister of Forests, Lands and Natural Resource Operations of British Columbia
In office June 22, 2017 – July 18, 2017
Premier	Christy Clark
Preceded by	Steve Thomson
Succeeded by	Doug Donaldson
Minister of Aboriginal Relations and Reconciliation of British Columbia
In office June 10, 2013 – July 18, 2017
Premier	Christy Clark
Preceded by	Ida Chong
Succeeded by	Scott Fraser

Member of the British Columbia Legislative Assembly for Nechako Lakes Prince George-Omineca (2005–2009)
- In office May 17, 2005 – October 24, 2026
- Preceded by: Paul Nettleton
- Succeeded by: Diane Black

Personal details
- Born: August 18, 1963 (age 63) Prince George, British Columbia, Canada
- Party: BC Conservative
- Other political affiliations: BC Liberal (2005–2022); Independent (2022–2023, 2026)

John Rustad (born August 18, 1963) is a Canadian politician who served as the leader of the Conservative Party of British Columbia from 2023 to 2025 and as leader of the Opposition from 2024 to 2025. He served as the member of the Legislative Assembly (MLA) representing the electoral district of Nechako Lakes from 2009 to 2026.

A former BC Liberal before his expulsion from caucus in 2022, he was first elected to the Legislative Assembly in 2005, representing Prince George-Omineca. He served in Premier Christy Clark's cabinet as Minister of Aboriginal Relations and Reconciliation, and Minister of Forests, Lands and Natural Resource Operations.

Rustad led the Conservative Party into the 2024 British Columbia general election. The Conservatives won 44 seats, the party's best showing in over 70 years; the party hadn't won more than two seats in an election since 1953.

His position as party leader was disputed in 2025 due to a vote by the Conservative caucus to replace him as leader with Trevor Halford and a statement by the party executive declaring Rustad to be "professionally incapacitated". Rustad rejected the description and insisted he was still leader of the party, but he resigned as party leader on December 4, 2025.

On September 18, 2026, Rustad, along with former interim leader Trevor Halford and Skeena MLA Claire Rattée were removed from the Conservative caucus by party leader Kerry-Lynne Findlay. The Office of the Clerk of the Legislative Assembly confirmed that the three were no longer members of the caucus and said it had been notified by Opposition Leader Heather Maahs. Rustad was one of 13 Conservative MLAs who had either left or been removed from the caucus under Findlay's leadership. Three days later, following Findlay's resignation as party leader, Rustad, Halford and Rattée were invited to rejoin the Conservative caucus.

== Early life ==
Rustad was born and raised in Prince George, British Columbia. His father worked in forestry, and his mother was a homemaker. He has two older brothers. Prior to provincial politics, he had worked in the forestry sector for two decades, founding a consulting firm named Western Geographic Information Systems Inc. in 1995. Between 2002 and 2005, he served as a trustee with School District 57 Prince George.

== Political career ==
=== BC Liberals ===
Rustad was first elected to the legislature in 2005 as a BC Liberal candidate, representing the riding of Prince George-Omineca. Following the riding's dissolution, he was re-elected in 2009 in the current Nechako Lakes riding. In his first two terms, he served as Parliamentary Secretary for Forestry to the Minister of Forests, Lands and Natural Resource Operations, and as a member of the Environment and Land Use Committee, Legislative Review Committee, Treasury Board, Select Standing Committee on Education, Select Standing Committee on Public Accounts and Select Standing Committee on Health.

He retained his seat in the 2013 election and was appointed Minister of Aboriginal Relations and Reconciliation by Premier Christy Clark. He kept his cabinet post following his re-election in 2017, and added the role of Minister of Forests, Lands and Natural Resource Operations to his duties after Steve Thomson's election as Speaker of the Legislative Assembly. Rustad continued in both ministerial roles until that July, when the Liberal minority government was defeated in a non-confidence motion.

He was re-elected in 2020, and served as the Liberals' critic for Forests, Lands and Natural Resource Operations. After reposting a misinformation graphic on Facebook and X claiming that carbon dioxide emissions were not contributing to climate change, Rustad was removed from the Liberal caucus by leader Kevin Falcon on August 18, 2022; he then sat in the legislature as an independent politician.

=== Leader of the BC Conservatives (2023–2025) ===
On February 16, 2023, Rustad joined the BC Conservative Party, giving the party representation in the legislature. Rustad cited "irreconcilable differences" with Falcon in explaining his party change.

On March 23, 2023, Rustad announced that he was running to be the leader of the BC Conservatives. He was acclaimed as the leader of the Conservatives on March 31, 2023, succeeding Trevor Bolin.

On September 13, 2023, BC United MLA Bruce Banman crossed the floor to join the Conservatives. This gave the Conservatives the two MLAs necessary for official party status.

Under Rustad's leadership, the BC Conservatives overtook BC United in public support. An Abacus Data poll in December 2023 put the Conservatives' popular vote share at 26 percent, ahead of BC United at 17 percent but behind the BC NDP at 44 percent. Later in August 2024, two months before the provincial election, a Mainstreet Research poll placed the Conservatives' popular vote share at 39 percent, ahead of both BC United at 12 percent and the BC NDP at 36 percent.

Rustad led his party into the 2024 British Columbia general election. During the campaign, BC United suspended its campaign and endorsed the Conservatives, cementing the party as the principal opposition to the NDP. The Conservatives won 44 seats, the party's best showing in over 70 years; the party hadn't won more than two seats in an election since 1953. On November 20, Rustad established his Official Opposition Shadow Cabinet, in which every Conservative MLA received a portfolio.

In 2025, Rustad passed his leadership review with 70.66% support. On the cut-off day to vote in the leadership review, more than 2,000 memberships were purchased with the same three credit cards and from the same email domain. BC Conservative officials said that all suspicious memberships were cancelled. His leadership in the 43rd Parliament had been marked by internal party disputes, with the expulsions and departures of MLAs Dallas Brodie, Jordan Kealy, Tara Armstrong, Elenore Sturko, and Amelia Boultbee. In addition, Brodie and Armstrong formed a splinter party, named OneBC. In October 2025, the party's management committee passed a motion that called on Rustad to step down as leader; he declined to do so.

==== Resignation ====
On December 3, 2025, 20 caucus members signed a letter calling for Rustad to resign his position as leader. The party's board of directors passed a resolution ousting him as leader, and appointed Surrey-White Rock MLA Trevor Halford as interim leader. In a statement, the party said that Rustad was too "professionally incapacitated" to continue as leader. However, in the immediate aftermath, five Conservative MLAs refused to acknowledge the board's decision and said that Rustad remained party leader, and Rustad himself rejected the board's decision and declared that he was still the leader of the party. The next day, the Western Standard reported that Rustad would step down as leader, and shortly thereafter announced that he had resigned, seeking to avoid what he described as a "civil war" within the party. During his resignation speech, he announced that he would not stand for re-election at the next election.

On September 18, 2026, Rustad, Trevor Halford, and Claire Rattée were removed from the Conservative caucus by Rustad's successor as leader, Kerry-Lynne Findlay. They were readmitted to the party on September 21, following the resignation of Findlay a day prior.

== Political positions ==
=== Climate change ===
Rustad's position on the validity of climate change science is unclear. In 2024, he claimed that "climate change is real" on the CBC show Power and Politics. In the same year, he also told the Globe and Mail editorial board that it is false that human beings emitting carbon dioxide causes climate change. Regardless of his belief in climate change, Rustad does not believe that any action should be taken at the provincial level, stating, “There is nothing we can do, as a province, to be able to address this.”

=== Housing ===
In 2024, Rustad pledged to his supporters that he would scrap a housing reform implemented by BC NDP in 2023 that legalized up to four housing units on lots that previously only allowed single-family housing and six housing units on lots near rapid transit stations. He described the reform as "a very authoritarian approach."

Rustad has expressed concerns about rent control; however, in 2024, he said that his party did not intend to touch rent control.

=== Land claims ===
Rustad has said that the efforts of the provincial government of British Columbia to recognize Indigenous land claims in Canada are "a direct assault on private property".

=== Public health ===
In July 2024, Rustad has claimed that he regretted getting the COVID-19 vaccine due to a heart problem that he experienced shortly afterward, and that COVID-19 vaccine mandates were about "shaping opinion and control on the population". He has said that flu and COVID-19 vaccines need to be available for "vulnerable people".

At the same online meeting hosted by anti-vaccine groups, Rustad said that he would be open to working with other jurisdictions for a "Nuremburg 2.0" event to look into prosecuting people responsible for the province's public health measures and vaccines during the COVID-19 pandemic, referring to an idea popular in anti-vaccine groups inspired by both the Nuremberg trials and the Nuremberg Code. After reporting on the comments surfaced in October 2024, Rustad apologized and said that it was wrong to compare public health measures and Nazi German crimes.

=== SOGI 123 ===
Rustad proposed removing from schools a set of teaching materials known as SOGI 123 (Sexual Orientation and Gender Identity) which according to CBC is a collection of "guides and resources that aim to help teachers address discrimination and bullying, create supportive and inclusive environments for 2SLGBTQ+ students and acknowledge varying genders and sexual orientations".

On September 30, 2023, Rustad shared a post on social media that appeared to compare the teaching of sexuality and gender to the residential school system.

=== Transgender identity ===
In 2024, Rustad introduced the Fairness in Women and Girl's Sports Act as a private members bill. The bill would have required participants in publicly-funded sports teams to compete according to their biological sex. The bill was voted down in first reading.

== Personal life ==
Rustad married his wife Kim in 1995. Kim is a cervical cancer survivor; as a result, they did not have children.

== Electoral record ==
2024 British Columbia general election: Nechako Lakes
Party	Candidate	Votes	%	±%	Expenditures
Conservative	John Rustad	7,851	67.45	–	$33,284.32
New Democratic	Murphy Abraham	3,167	27.21	-7.13	$11,629.69
Green	Douglas Gook	622	5.34	–	$535.00
Total valid votes/expense limit		11,640	99.79	–	$71,700.08
Total rejected ballots		25	0.21	–	
Turnout		11,665	63.37	+13.46	
Registered voters		18,407			
Conservative hold		Swing		–	
Source: Elections BC

2020 British Columbia general election: Nechako Lakes
Party	Candidate	Votes	%	±%	Expenditures
Liberal	John Rustad	4,611	52.24	−2.15	$17,423.82
New Democratic	Anne Marie Sam	3,031	34.34	+4.53	$9,236.20
Christian Heritage	Dan Stuart	413	4.68	–	$991.53
Libertarian	Jon Rempel	403	4.57	+0.32	$0.00
Independent	Margo Maley	368	4.17	–	$1,280.76
Total valid votes/expense limit		8,826	99.38	–	$66,123.96
Total rejected ballots		55	0.62	–0.06	
Turnout		8,881	49.91	–9.15	
Registered voters		17,794			
Liberal hold		Swing		–3.34	
Source: Elections BC

2017 British Columbia general election: Nechako Lakes
Party	Candidate	Votes	%	±%	Expenditures
Liberal	John Rustad	5,307	54.39	+0.6	$43,487
New Democratic	Anne Marie Sam	2,909	29.81	+2.16	$14,578
Green	Douglas Norman Gook	878	9.00	+3.85	$163
Libertarian	Jon Rempel	438	4.49	–	$3,100
Independent	Al Trampuh	226	2.31	–	
Total valid votes		9,758	100.00		
Total rejected ballots		67	0.68		
Turnout		9,825	59.06		
Registered voters		16,636			
Source: Elections BC

2013 British Columbia general election: Nechako Lakes
Party	Candidate	Votes	%	±%	Expenditures
Liberal	John Rustad	5,324	53.79	–1.97	$75,052
New Democratic	Sussanne Skidmore-Hewlett	2,737	27.65	–7.64	$56,108
Conservative	Dan Brooks	1,253	12.66	–	$52,518
Green	Colin Hamm	510	5.15	–1.15	$1,599
Advocational	Beverly Bird	74	0.75	–	$3,009
Total valid votes		9,898	100.0		
Total rejected ballots		42	0.42		
Turnout		9,940	58.46		
Liberal hold		Swing		+2.84	
Source: Elections BC

2009 British Columbia general election: Nechako Lakes
Party	Candidate	Votes	%	Expenditures
Liberal	John Rustad	4,949	55.76	$60,522
New Democratic	Byron Goerz	3,133	35.29	$7,480
Green	Gerard Riley	559	6.30	$350
Refederation	Mike Summers	235	2.65	$1,110
Total valid votes		8,876	99.25	
Total rejected ballots		67	0.75	
Turnout		8,943	54.80	
Source: Elections BC

2005 British Columbia general election: Prince George–Omineca
Party	Candidate	Votes	%	Expenditures
Liberal	John Rustad	8,622	51.71	$87,794
New Democratic	Chuck Fraser	6,180	37.06	$64,805
Green	Andrej J. DeWolf	1,393	8.35	$2,139
Democratic Reform	Erle Martz	479	2.87	$983
Total valid votes		16,674	100	
Total rejected ballots		91	0.55	
Turnout		16,765	64.22	
Source: Elections British Columbia
