= Len Fox (politician) =

Canadian politician

Leonard Albert Fox (March 29, 1943 – October 8, 2018) was a businessman and politician in British Columbia. He represented Prince George-Omineca in the Legislative Assembly of British Columbia from 1991 to 1996 as a Social Credit and then Reform Party member.

He was born in Telkwa, British Columbia. In 1964, he moved from Quesnel to Vanderhoof, where he played hockey for the Vanderhoof Bears. Fox was a school trustee and served as chairman of the school board. He served three consecutive terms as mayor of Vanderhoof, beginning in November 1981. On March 14, 1994, he joined the Reform Party caucus in the provincial assembly. After leaving provincial politics, Fox was elected mayor again in 1999, serving until 2008. At the time of his death, he was the longest serving mayor of Vanderhoof.
