= Debra Toporowski =

Canadian politician

- Qwulti’stunaat 黃德美
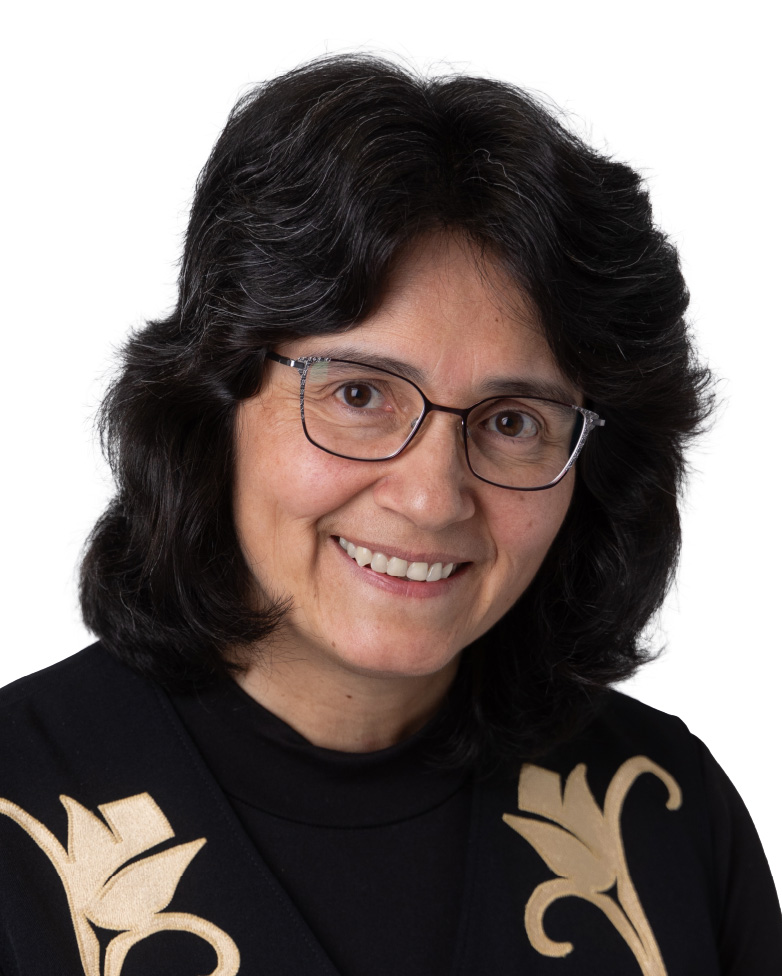
- Campaign portrait, 2024

Parliamentary Secretary for Rural Health of British Columbia
- Incumbent
- Assumed office November 18, 2024
- Premier: David Eby
- Preceded by: Jennifer Rice

Member of the British Columbia Legislative Assembly for Cowichan Valley
- In office October 19, 2024 – October 24, 2026
- Preceded by: Sonia Furstenau
- Succeeded by: Bert Chen

Personal details
- Party: New Democratic

Chinese name
- Traditional Chinese: 黃德美
- Simplified Chinese: 黄德美
Transcriptions
Standard Mandarin
- Hanyu Pinyin: Huáng Déměi
Yue: Cantonese
- Jyutping: Wong^{4} Dak^{1} Mei^{5}

Debra-Ann Patricia Toporowski (Quw’utsun: Qwulti’stunaat; traditional Chinese: 黃德美; simplified Chinese: 黄德美) is a Canadian politician who served as a member of the Legislative Assembly of British Columbia (MLA) representing the electoral district of Cowichan Valley from 2024 to 2026. A member of the New Democratic Party, she served as Parliamentary Secretary for Rural Health of British Columbia from 2024 to 2026 under Premier David Eby.

First elected as a councillor for the Cowichan Tribes in 2013, Toporowski was re-elected for five terms. She ran as a candidate for the municipal council of North Cowichan in 2018 and served two terms. At the time of her election as an MLA, she was serving as a councillor in both bodies, amid other engagements including serving as acting mayor for North Cowichan and as the director for North Cowichan on the Cowichan Valley Regional District board. Toporowski previously worked as a constituency assistant for MLAs Bill Routley and Doug Routley.

== Early life and career ==
Toporowski was born and raised in the Cowichan Valley. She is of First Nations and Chinese descent, the child of Ethel Jack and Howard Wong. She had three brothers and two sisters. Her maternal grandparents are Rosie Peter and Stephen Jack from Quamichan, and her paternal grandparents are Chung Yoi Wong and Sue Yee Wong from Duncan. Toporowski was barred from membership within the Cowichan Tribes prior to 1985, due to the provisions of the Indian Act; her mother was forced to relinquish her Indian status due to her marriage to a Chinese-Canadian man. As a result of the passage of Bill C-31, Toporowski was able to regain her status. Toporowski's name in Quw’utsun is Qwulti’stunaat.

Toporowski has been a member of the New Democratic Party since 2005, and had worked as a constituency assistant in the offices of NDP MLAs Bill Routley and Doug Routley for 12 years. Part of her duties as a constituency assistant was monitoring local government and community events in order to keep the MLA updated on local issues, and Toporowski served as a representative for them at community functions.

== Political career ==
=== Municipal politics ===
Toporowski served five terms as a councillor of the Cowichan Tribes, having first been elected in 2013. During that time she served on various committees: the Cowichan Nation Alliance, Cowichan Tribes Treaty, Cowichan Watershed Board, Cowichan Watershed Society, the Duncan Chamber of Commerce, Fishing Committee, Health Advisory Committee, Island Corridor Foundation, Justice Committee, Khowutzun Gaming Corporation, and the Quw’utsun Kw’atl’ Kwa (Ocean) Fisheries Board and Housing Committee Upon her election as MLA, she resigned her seat from the Cowichan Tribes council on November 1, 2024. She was succeeded by D'Arcy Joe Jr., who received the next highest number of votes during the previous election.

She was first elected councillor in the municipality of North Cowichan in 2018, and won a second term in 2022. Upon her election to municipal council, Toporowski became the first elected woman to hold both positions on two councils at the same time, and would serve on both councils until she was elected as MLA. During her tenure as councillor, Toporowski opposed a measure by councillor Christopher Justice which would have discouraged residential development until the passage of an official community plan. She had recused herself from a proposed development that was planned across the local hospital, citing her perceived conflict of interest. She was acting mayor at the time of her nomination as a BC NDP candidate, and served as director for North Cowichan on the Cowichan Valley Regional District (CVRD) board. She had been on a leave of absence since September 5, 2024 in order to focus on the provincial election campaign, and resigned from council on November 1, 2024 following her election as MLA. While not obligated to resign from the municipal council, Toporowski expressed her desire to focus her attention on the responsibilities as an MLA full-time.

=== Provincial politics ===
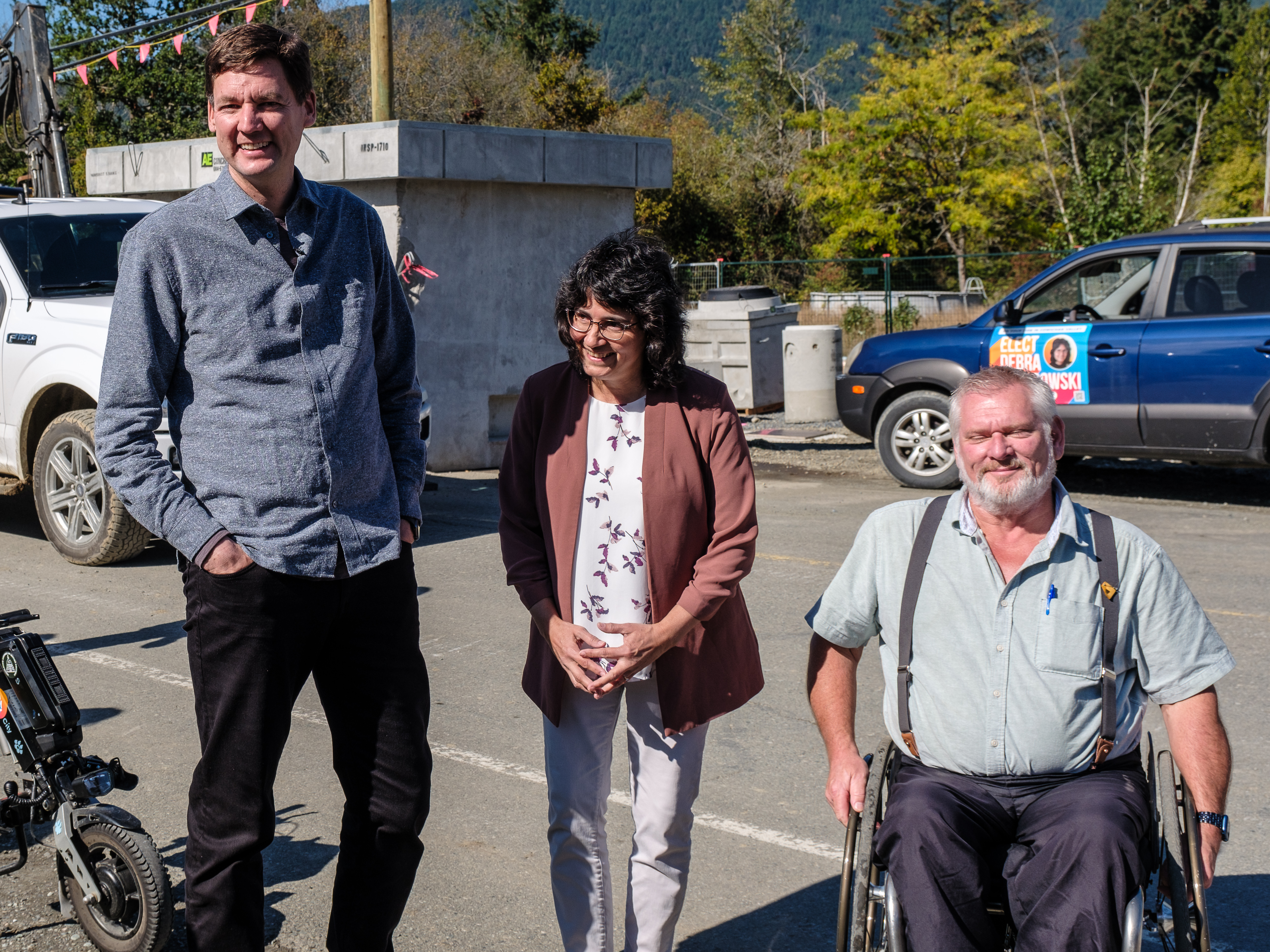
Toporowski campaigning alongside David Eby and Dana Lajeunesse

Toporowski was acclaimed as the BC NDP's candidate for the riding of Cowichan Valley on May 11, 2024, with Premier David Eby announcing such in Duncan, British Columbia. The riding had been adjusted during the 2021 British Columbia electoral redistribution, and had been represented by Green Party leader Sonia Furstenau, who was vacating her seat to run in the riding of Victoria-Beacon Hill. Toporowski faced four other candidates for the seat: Jon Coleman (unaffiliated, former BC United), Eden Haythornthwaite (independent socialist), John Koury (Conservative), and Cammy Lockwood (Green). Sarah Simpson in the Cowichan Valley Citizen described the riding as having been initially a three horse race, but with the Greens falling out following Fursteneau's departure. Hugh Chan writing for Business in Vancouver noted that due to the reconstituted boundaries, the riding had become more friendly to the NDP, with the redistribution of Green-friendly regions of the CVRD to neighbouring Juan de Fuca-Malahat including Shawnigan Lake. Chan believed that Toporowski could benefit from her membership in the Cowichan Tribes increasing turnout, but that it could be complicated by independent Jon Coleman who was also a Tribes member.

Toporowski was subject to election sign vandalism during her campaign, having her face cut out of one sign and having another melted. Describing the incident as "upsetting," she noted that signs for her municipal runs had been similarly damaged. She recalled her husband and grandson being subject to verbal harassment while putting up signs for her campaign.

Toporowski was successful in her bid for the riding, winning by a margin of 726 votes over Conservative candidate John Koury. Sarah Simpson writing for the Cowichan Valley Citizen described the count as a "back-and-forth battle" and "a true nail-biter between the Conservatives and NDP." Toporowski was one of three municipal councillors from Vancouver Island who won seats in the 2024 provincial election, alongside Darlene Rotchford and Dana Lajeunesse, leading to by-elections in all three municipal council seats. Following her election, she was named Parliamentary Secretary for Rural Health in November 2024. She succeeds Jennifer Rice, who chose not to run for re-election. She was unseated in the 2026 British Columbia general election.

== Political positions ==
Speaking with My Cowichan Valley Now during her 2018 municipal candidacy, Toporowski highlighted "water, affordable housing, and social issues" as the most important issues in North Cowichan. She emphasized balancing the needs of the protection of land, water, and air and a strong economy. Speaking with the Times Colonist, Toporowski highlighted the "lack of affordable housing and health care" as top of mind issues. In the same interview, she highlighted the shared fundamental values that she had shared with the New Democratic Party, highlighting human rights. Toporowski was described as a "champion for Indigenous watersheds and the services people count on" by Robert Barron writing in the Cowichan Valley Citizen.

Toporowski highlighted her agreement with David Eby's action plan regarding housing in British Columbia, highlighting the creation of 300,000 homes in the province. She expressed her support for rent controls and efforts to crack down on housing speculation and short-term rentals.

In an all-candidates forum on held on October 7, 2024, Toporowski highlighted community safety improvements due to bail reform, and increasing bed capacity in order to continue treatment options. She stated that her goal was to "get those struggling with addiction connected with the right care, and places when they are ready for treatment." Toporowski cited her involvement with Our Cowichan Community Health Network towards giving her insight on the gaps in services for vulnerable individuals in society.

== Personal life ==
Toporowski lives in Chemainus, and had previously lived in Duncan, British Columbia for 42 years.

== Electoral history ==
2026 British Columbia general election: Cowichan Valley
Party	Candidate	Votes	%	±%	Expenditures
Conservative	Bert Chen	11,100	42.79	+5.20	
New Democratic	Debra Toporowski	10,949	42.21	+1.70	
Green	Justin Douglas	3,750	14.46	-5.37	
Communist	James Chumsa	100	0.39	-	
Total valid votes		25,899	99.84		
Total rejected ballots		41	0.16		
Turnout					
Registered voters					
Conservative gain from New Democratic		Swing		+3.45	
Source: Elections BC

2024 British Columbia general election: Cowichan Valley
Party	Candidate	Votes	%	±%	Expenditures
New Democratic	Debra Toporowski	11,795	40.51	-4.2	$58,842.93
Conservative	John Koury	10,946	37.59	–	$22,324.63
Green	Cammy Lockwood	5,773	19.83	-19.1	$37,278.36
Independent	Eden Haythornthwaite	341	1.17	–	$5,153.95
Unaffiliated	Jon Coleman	263	0.90	–	$2,574.59
Total valid votes/expense limit		29,118	99.87	–	$71,700.08
Total rejected ballots		39	0.13	–	
Turnout		29,157	63.52	–	
Registered voters		45,901			
New Democratic notional hold		Swing		–	
Source: Elections BC

== See also ==
- 43rd Parliament of British Columbia
