= 2020 Green Party of British Columbia leadership election =

Green Party of British Columbia leadership election

2020 BC Green Party leadership election
- September 5–13, 2020
- Turnout: 85%
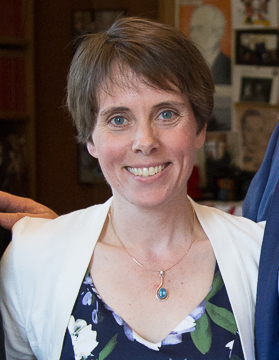

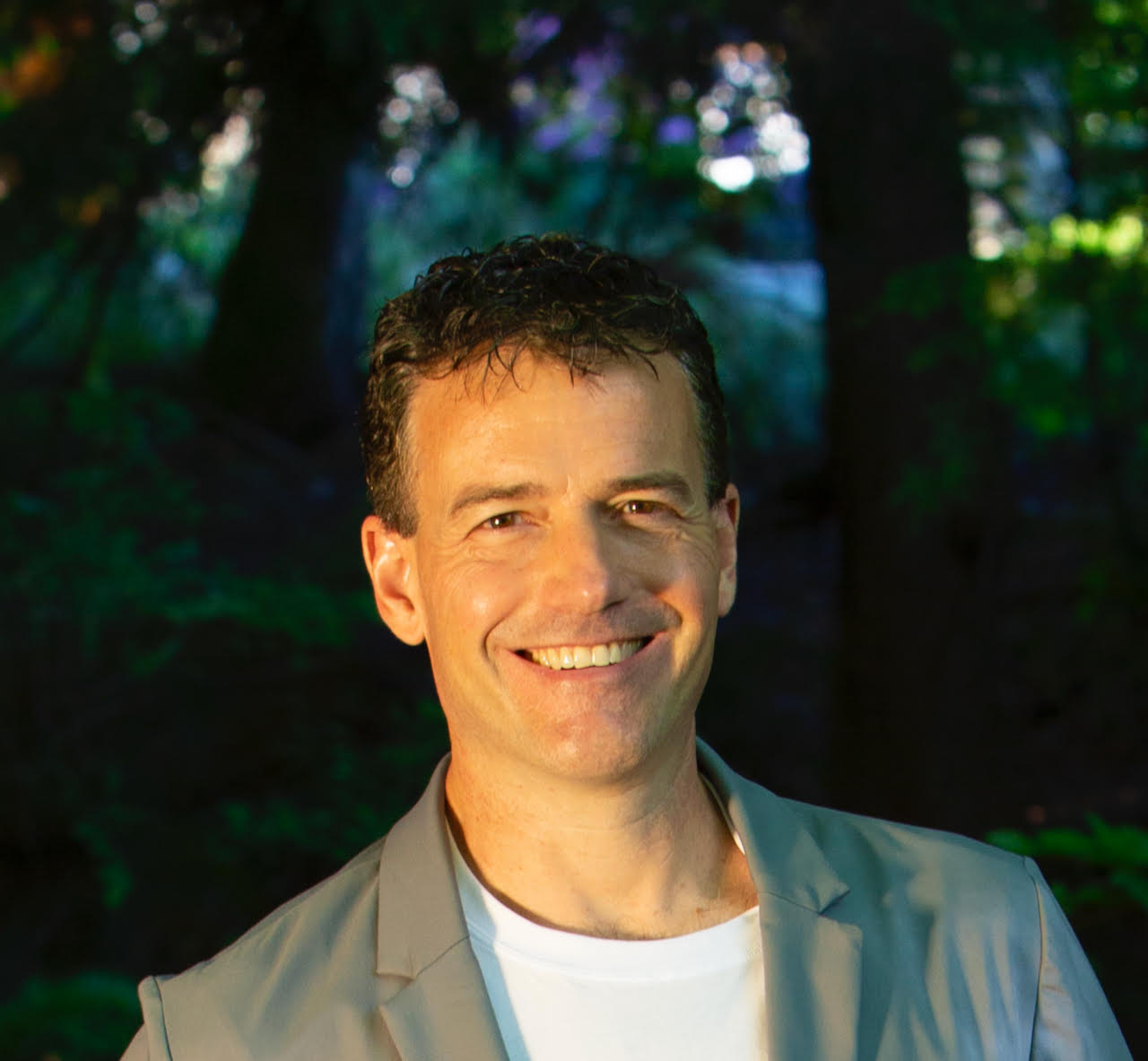

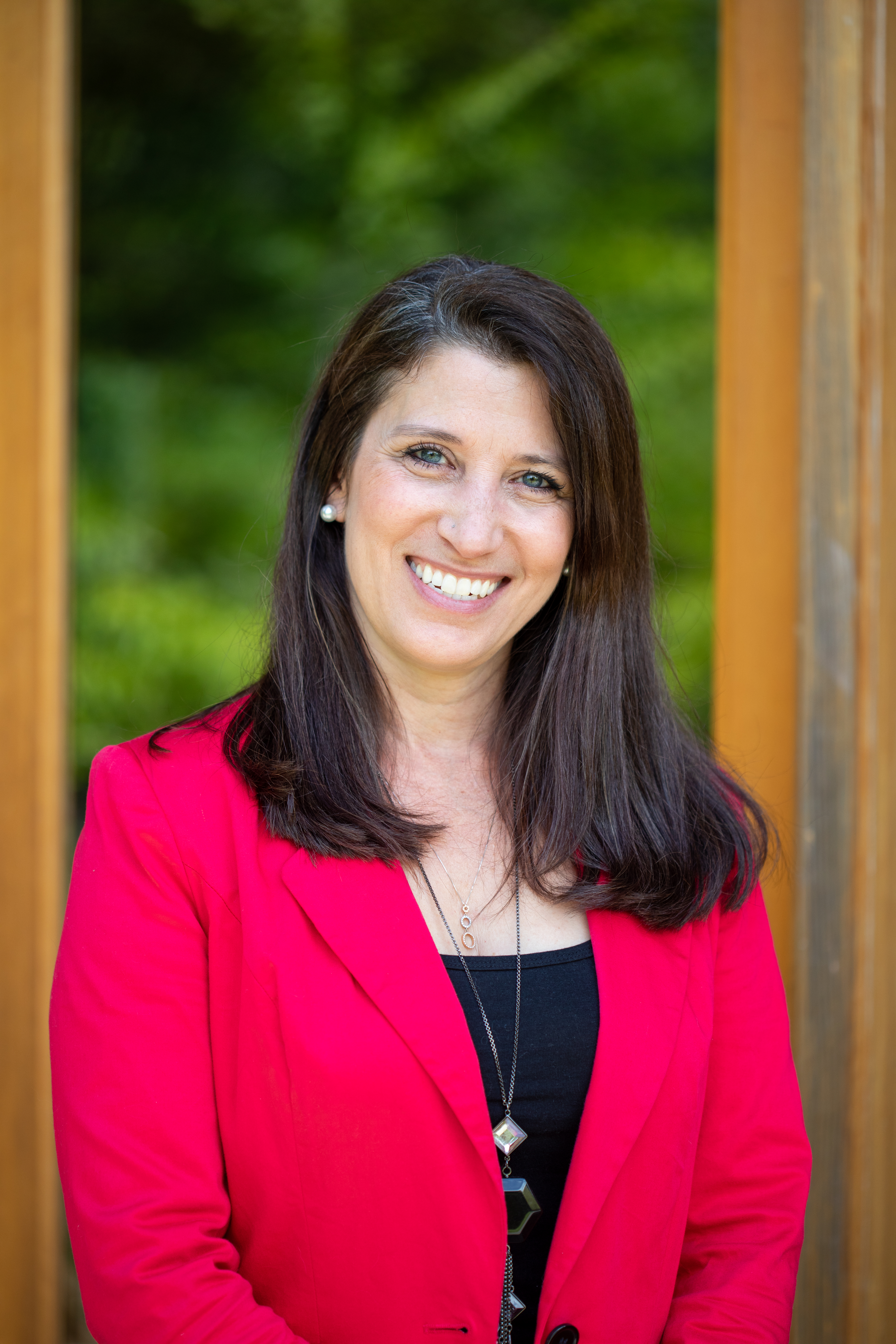
Candidate	Sonia Furstenau	Cam Brewer	Kim Darwin
Final round	2,428	2,127	Eliminated
First round	2,197	1,916	521
Previous leader
Adam Olsen (interim)
Elected leader
Sonia Furstenau

2020 Green Party of British Columbia leadership election
- Date: September 14, 2020
- Convention: Nanaimo, British Columbia
- Resigning leader: Andrew Weaver
- Won by: Sonia Furstenau
- Ballots: 2
- Candidates: 3
- Entrance fee: $16,000
- Spending limit: $300,000

The Green Party of British Columbia held an election between September 5 and 13, 2020, to elect a leader to replace Andrew Weaver, who resigned on January 6, 2020, due to a personal health issue. Adam Olsen was made interim leader shortly after Weaver's resignation. Party members cast votes online and by telephone, using ranked ballots. Members and supporters 16 years of age and older were eligible to vote.

On March 27, 2020, the election was postponed indefinitely due to the COVID-19 pandemic and the resultant state of emergency in the province. Before the postponement, voting was to take place between June 15 and 26. The deadline to enter the race was to be April 15, and debates were planned to take place after April 30, in three regions of the province. The winner was to be announced at the party's convention in Nanaimo from June 26 to 28 that year.

The campaign resumed on June 15, 2020. The party opened a second nomination period which ran from June 26 to July 27. Members and supporters had until August 21 to register in order to be able to vote by phone, and until September 2 to be able to vote online. A debate took place on September 1. Voting occurred from September 5 to 13. On September 14, 2020, it was announced that Sonia Furstenau had won the contest. Turnout among eligible voters was 85%.

== Timeline ==
=== 2019 ===
- October 7 – Andrew Weaver announces he will step down as party leader once a new leader is chosen.
- December 20 – Adam Olsen is named interim leader.

=== 2020 ===
- January 6 – The party releases the leadership contest rules.
- January 13 – Leadership contest officially begins.
- January 27 – Deputy Leader Sonia Furstenau announces her candidacy.
- March 4 – Kim Darwin announces her candidacy.
- March 27 – The election is postponed indefinitely due to the COVID-19 pandemic.
- April 15 – Original deadline for candidates to enter race. The deadline was subsequently changed to July 27 following postponement of the race.
- June 15 – The leadership race is officially re-opened following the postponement.
- July 25 – Cam Brewer announces his candidacy.
- July 27 – Deadline for candidates to apply.
- August 21 – Deadline to become a member or supporter if voting by phone.
- September 1 – Official leadership debate.
- September 2 – Deadline to become a member or supporter if online voting.
- September 5 – Voting period begins.
- September 13 – Voting period ends.
- September 14 – Leader announced.

== Results ==
Results by round
Candidate	1st round		2nd round	
Candidate	Votes cast	%	Votes cast	%
Sonia Furstenau	2,197	47.41%	2,428	53.30%
Cam Brewer	1,916	41.35%	2,127	46.70%
Kim Darwin	521	11.24%	Eliminated	
Total	4,634	100%	4,555	100%

== Debates ==
Debates among candidates for the 2020 Green Party of British Columbia leadership election
No.	Date	Place	Host	Topic	Moderator	Participants		
P Participant A Absent invitee N Non-invitee O Out of race (exploring or withdrawn)						Brewer	Darwin	Furstenau
1	September 1, 2020	Online	Green Party of British Columbia	Various	Neetu Garcha	P	P	P

== Candidates ==
=== Cam Brewer ===
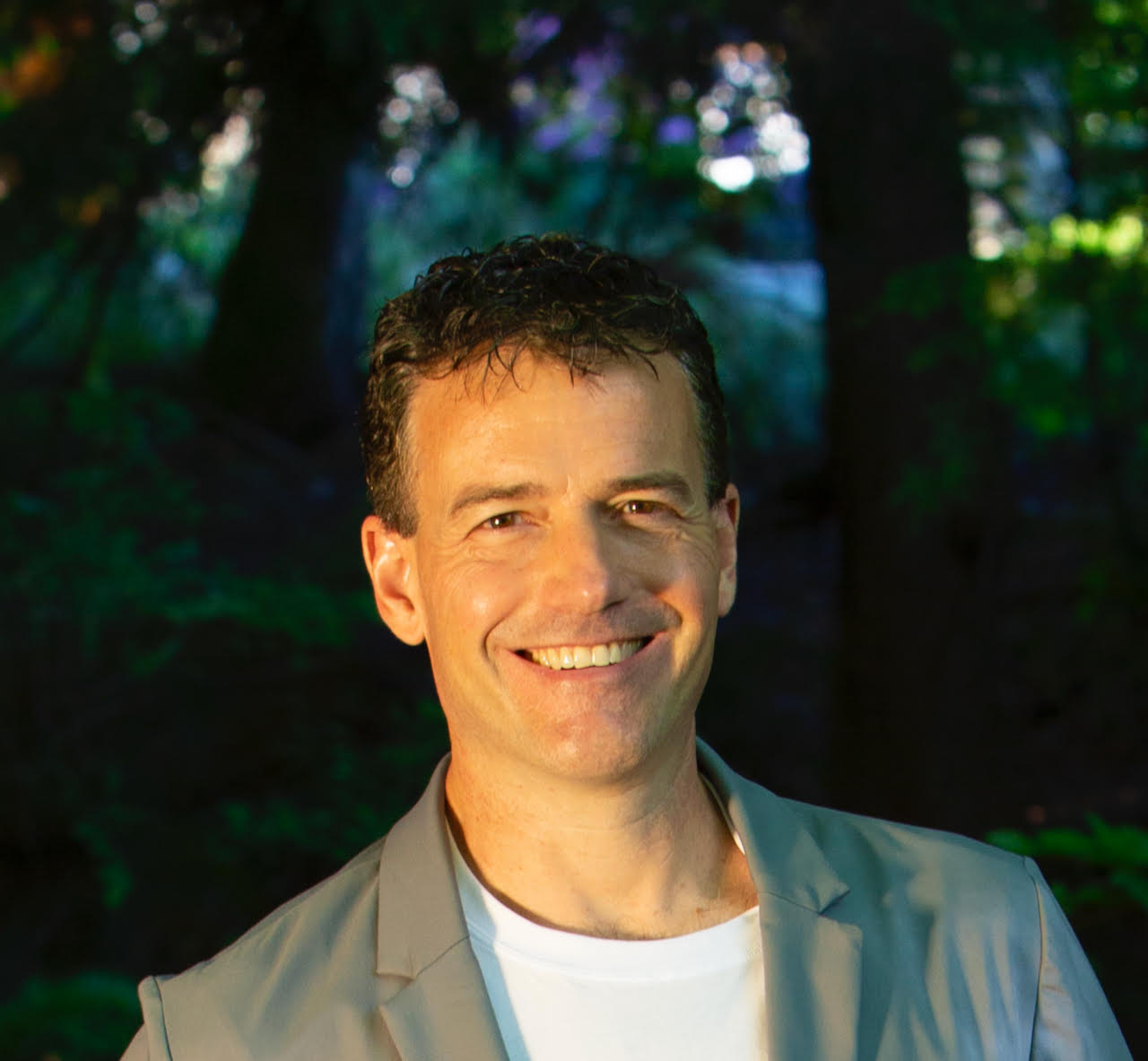
Cam Brewer

Cam Brewer is a Vancouver lawyer and Simon Fraser University adjunct professor who practices environmental and Aboriginal law.

Candidacy announced: July 25, 2020
Date registered with Elections BC:
Campaign website: cambrewer.ca

=== Kim Darwin ===
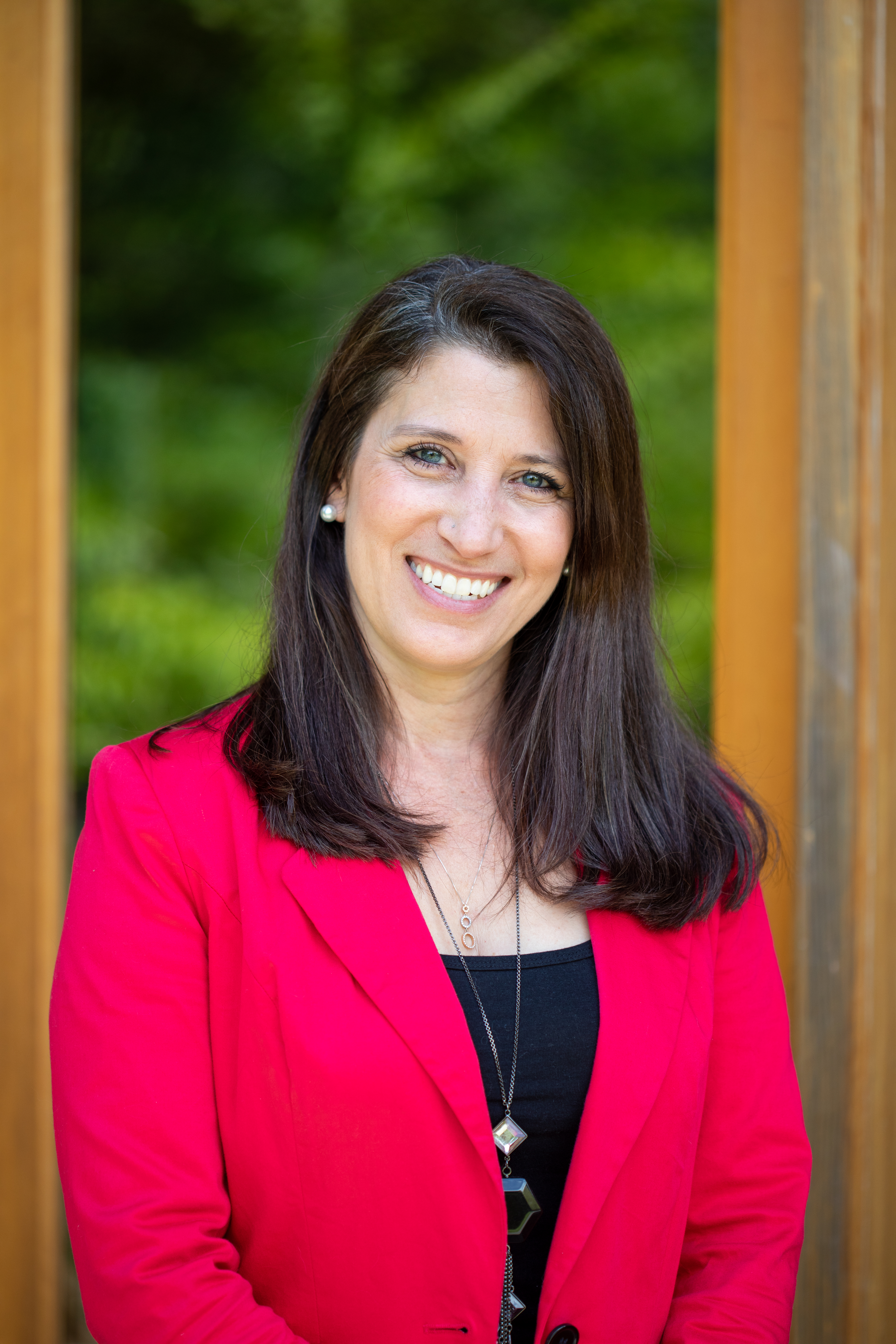
Kim Darwin

Kim Darwin is an independent mortgage consultant and former president of the Sechelt Chamber of Commerce. She served as vice chair of the Green Party of British Columbia's provincial council and stood as a candidate for Powell River-Sunshine Coast in 2017.

Candidacy announced: March 4, 2020
Date registered with Elections BC:
Campaign website: kimdarwin.ca

=== Sonia Furstenau ===
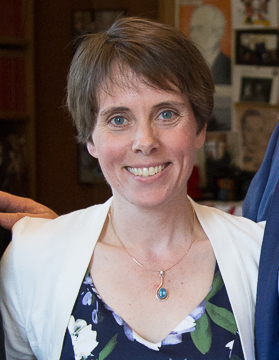
Sonia Furstenau

Sonia Furstenau, 49, is the MLA for Cowichan Valley (2017–present) and deputy leader of the party (2016–present).

Candidacy announced: January 27, 2020
Date registered with Elections BC:
Campaign website: soniafurstenau.ca

Endorsements of Sonia Furstenau
- Former provincial candidates:
  - Josh Drozda (2015 candidate for Green Party of Alberta in Leduc-Beaumont)
  - Kalen Harris (2017 candidate in Victoria-Beacon Hill)
  - Dan Hines (2017 candidate in Kamloops-North Thompson
  - James Marshall (2017 candidate in Vancouver-West End)
  - Jean-Michel Toriel (2009 candidate in Vancouver-Langara)
  - Mark Neufeld (2017 candidate in Saanich South)
- Municipal politicians:
  - Lisa Helps (Mayor of Victoria, 2014–2022)
  - Joe Keithley (Councillor, City of Burnaby)
  - Andy Mackinnion (Metchosin councillor)
  - Rik Logtenberg (Councillor, City of Nelson)
  - Sarah Potts (Councillor, City of Victoria)
- Federal MPs and candidates:
  - Bridget Burns (2019 candidate in Vancouver East)
  - Amita Kuttner (Green Party critic for science and innovation, 2019 candidate in Burnaby North—Seymour)
  - Frances Litman (2015 candidate in Esquimalt-Saanich-Sooke)
  - Paul Manly (Member of Parliament for Nanaimo—Ladysmith, 2019–present)
  - Elizabeth May (leader of the Green Party of Canada from 2006 to 2019, member of Parliament for Saanich—Gulf Islands since 2011)
- Other prominent individuals:
  - Eli Enns (President and CEO of IIISAAK Olam Foundation)
  - David Suzuki

=== Declined ===
- Jonina Campbell – deputy leader (2018–present), candidate for New Westminster in 2017.
- Adriane Carr – Vancouver city councillor (2011–2025), former deputy leader of the Green Party of Canada (2006–2014), former leader of the Green Party of British Columbia (2000–2005, 1983–1985).
- Pete Fry – Vancouver city councillor (2018–present), candidate for Vancouver-Mount Pleasant in 2016 by-election.
- Lisa Helps – Mayor of Victoria (2014–2022). Endorsed Furstenau.
- Joe Keithley – Burnaby city councillor (2018–present), candidate for Burnaby-Lougheed in 2017.
- Racelle Kooy – Green Party of Canada candidate for Victoria in 2019.
- Adam Olsen – MLA for Saanich North and the Islands (2017–2024), former interim leader (2013–2015). Became interim leader.
- Dana Taylor – former North Vancouver councillor, candidate for West Vancouver-Sea to Sky in 2017, Green Party of Canada candidate for West Vancouver—Sunshine Coast—Sea to Sky Country in 2019.
- Michael Wiebe – Vancouver city councillor (2018–2022), former commissioner of the Vancouver Park Board (2014–2018).

== See also ==
- 2020 Green Party of Canada leadership election
