= Shawnigan Lake =

Shawnigan Lake may refer to:

- Shawnigan Lake (British Columbia), a lake on Vancouver Island, Canada
- Shawnigan Lake, British Columbia, a village in the Cowichan Valley Regional District, Canada
