= Bert Chen =

Canadian politician

Bert Chen MLA

Member of the British Columbia Legislative Assembly for Cowichan Valley
- Incumbent
- Assumed office October 24, 2026
- Preceded by: Debra Toporowski

Personal details
- Party: Conservative
- Website: website

Bert Chen MLA is a Canadian politician who is the Member of the British Columbia Legislative Assembly for Cowichan Valley since the 2026 British Columbia general election. He is a small business owner on Vancouver Island.

Chen was previously a member of the national council of the Conservative Party of Canada representing Ontario. He was suspended in 2021 for launching a petition to oust then-leader Erin O'Toole hours after the party lost the 2021 Canadian general election. O’Toole suspected that China may have played a role in his ouster, although Chen denies these allegations pointing out he was born in Taipei and stating his reason for launching the petition was O'Toole's decision to run as a Red Tory in the general election (a particular example Chen cited being O'Toole's support for carbon pricing) when he ran as a Blue Tory in the 2020 Conservative Party of Canada leadership election.

== Electoral record ==
2026 British Columbia general election: Cowichan Valley
Party	Candidate	Votes	%	±%	Expenditures
Conservative	Bert Chen	11,100	42.79	+5.20	
New Democratic	Debra Toporowski	10,949	42.21	+1.70	
Green	Justin Douglas	3,750	14.46	−5.37	
Communist	James Chumsa	100	0.39	—	
Total valid votes		25,899	99.84		
Total rejected ballots		41	0.16		
Turnout					
Registered voters					
Conservative gain from New Democratic		Swing		+3.45	
Source: Elections BC
