= Bill Routley =

Canadian politician

Member of the British Columbia Legislative Assembly for Cowichan Valley
- In office May 12, 2009 – May 9, 2017
- Preceded by: Constituency established
- Succeeded by: Sonia Furstenau

Personal details
- Born: December 1948 (age 77)
- Party: New Democratic
- Spouse: Charmaine
- Children: 2
- Occupation: Mill worker, Trade union representative

Bill Routley is a Canadian politician who served as a member of the Legislative Assembly of British Columbia (MLA) representing the electoral district of Cowichan Valley from 2009 to 2017. He is a member of the New Democratic Party.

Prior to being elected as an MLA, Routley worked in Vancouver Island forest industry. He worked at the Youbou Sawmill before taking a job working for his union, the International Woodworkers of America-Canada, Local 1-80. He eventually became president of the union local, which merged with other unions to become the USW-Steelworkers Local 1-1937. At the union, Routley helped negotiate contracts, advocated for work safety measures, campaigned against raw log exports, and fought mill closure.

== Background ==
Routley, the son of a Pentecostal minister, was raised on Vancouver Island. He began a career in the forestry industry with a job at the B.C. Forest Product's Youbou (veneer) sawmill. A bad experience earlier in life, while working at a shoe store in Victoria, made Routley interested in worker rights. At Youbou Routley was elected chairman of his local union's Safety Committee and then as chairman of its Plant Committee. During that time he also acted as a School Trustee in Lake Cowichan In 1985 Routley accepted a 3-month position working at the union office in Duncan. The temporary job led to a permanent position at the office and in 1986 he became the vice-president of IWA-Canada, Local 1-80. In the late-1980s Routley and the union were involved in fighting against wasteful logging practises. Protest rallies were held to raise awareness of forest mismanagement by Fletcher Challenge Canada which led to fines against the company and they formed the "Woodworker's Survival Task Force" to investigate how to keep local sawmills operational following years of over-logging and waste.

In the 1990s, in addition to starting a home decorating business with his wife, Routley became president of the IWA-Canada, Local 1-80, conflicted with environmentalists protesting logging at Clayoquot Sound, where he viewed the postponement of logging as costing jobs, and he opposed the division of Tree Farm License 46 as detrimental to the Youbou mill which was struggling. In the summer 2000, Routley represented over 12,000 members of the IWA-Canada, Local 1-80 engaged in a 10-day strike against the Forest Industrial Relations (FIR), a corporate bargaining unit representing 70 companies. After that three-year contract expired, another strike occurred (with the exception of a few financially troubled mills) over the attempt by the FIR (which by then represented 61 companies) to impose a contract onto the union. The three-week strike ended with back-to-work legislation, the Coastal Forest Industry Dispute Settlement Act, adopted by the 37th Parliament of British Columbia. The back-to-work legislation caused a rift within the union, as it was agreed to by IWA-Canada president Dave Haggard, but opposed by the local presidents, including Routley. He also opposed union leadership during its merger into the United Steelworkers Union of America — Routley opposed the merger believing it would make the union less responsive to forestry issues. Union members approved the merger and Routley kept his position as a local president, saying "my view is we have to embrace this change". Also during the 2000s, Routley fought against increases to raw log exports which he saw as coming at the expense of Vancouver Island mills as the raw logs were being sent to more efficient mills in the United States and Asia and he directly blamed the softwood lumber deal and legislated increased allowable raw log export quotas. With TimberWest seeking to permanently close the Youbou mill, Routley and community members sought to purchase the mill as the Cowichan Lake Community Forest Co-op. The cooperative was unable to raise sufficient funds and the mill closed in 2001. The union sued the province for damages resulting from the closure arguing it violated a clause in the Tree Farm License and the province in turn sued Youbou owners TimberWest for the damages.

Routley campaigned for safety measures following a spike in occupational fatalities (43 deaths in 2005). He helped stage awareness rallies and the December 2005 Forest Fatalities Summit. He blamed a Labour Relations Board ruling during the 2004 contract bargaining that gave forestry companies the right to set flexible hours without consultation with employees which Routley linked to over-worked and exhausted employees. Routley was also critical of the bidding process for contractors used by forestry companies which he saw as contributing to the erosion of safety-related rules and procedures. The next contract negotiations occurred in 2007 with FIR now representing 31 companies affecting 7,000 union members. A 12-week strike ensued but the union won limits contracting-out of services and the ability to decline shift work that they saw as contributing to the increasing casualties. Routley recommended refusal of the contract but union members narrowly approved the deal.

In 2008, as the Great Recession was affecting the forestry industry with significant layoffs, Routley's Local 1-80 merged with Local 1-363 to form Local 1-1937. Routley, who had announced his candidacy for the newly formed provincial electoral district of Cowichan Valley, supported the merger. He resigned from his union position after he won the NDP nomination, defeating two others: health-care worker Rhoda Taylor and former Cowichan Valley Regional District rural director Richard Hughes on the first ballot.

== Provincial politics ==
In the May 2009 election, Routley faced Cathy Basskin of Cowichan Bay for the BC Liberals, Simon Lindley of Maple Bay for the Green Party, Jason Murray of Cowichan Bay for the BC Conservative Party, and Michial Moore of Shawnigan Lake for the BC Refederation Party. Routley, who was the favourite to win, had a campaign focused on contrasting major projects identified with BC Liberal Party leader and Premier Gordon Campbell like the Olympics and the Sea to Sky Highway with over-crowded health care facilities. Even though the 60-year-old Routley won his riding, his BC New Democratic Party formed the official opposition to the BC Liberals who formed a majority government.

As the 39th Parliament began, Routley was assigned the role of deputy critic of the Ministry of Forests and Range, with fellow NDP MLA Norm Macdonald as the full-time critic. The two critics toured the province to consult with stakeholders in the forestry industry in summer 2009. Their work on reviewing the proposed Forestry Service Providers Protection Act was cited as a rare instance of criticism by opposition politicians having a real, beneficial impact on proposed legislation as they successfully had the act amended to carry forward provisions from the Woodworkers Lien Act. On Vancouver Island, after Catalyst Paper refused to pay its property taxes on its Crofton mill, Routley sided in favour of municipality saying the sawmill should pay its full property tax bill.

Routley was appointed to the Select Standing Committee on Finance and Government Services. The committee toured the province to meet with stakeholders and delivered a report concerning budget priorities. He was sharply critical of the BC Liberal Party for introducing HST and campaigned for its repeal. The HST referendum returned 56% of his Cowichan Valley constituency voting to repeal the tax in favour of the PST. During the debate in the Legislative Assembly to lower the HST by 2% Routley was applauded for launching a "mini-filibuster" that prevented Premier Christy Clark from speaking on the issue.

Routley had remained loyal to party leader Carole James and greeted her resignation with sadness. During the subsequent NDP leadership election, Routley endorsed John Horgan, saying that Horgan "really gets rural issues and he has the creativity and collaborative approach that we need to find real solutions to rural problems". After Adrian Dix won and became the leader of the BC NDP, he kept Routley at the deputy critic role focusing on forestry and natural resource operation.

In January 2013 Routley underwent heart valve replacement surgery. He recovered and, at the age of 64, sought re-election. In the May 2013 election he was again challenged by candidates from the BC Liberal Party, BC Green Party and BC Conservative Party but from the beginning of the campaign Routley was viewed as the most likely to win. While Routley was re-elected, his party again formed the official opposition to a BC Liberal majority government. As the 40th Parliament began, Dix kept Routley as the deputy critic of the Ministry of Forests and Range, with fellow NDP MLA Norm Macdonald as the full-time critic. In 2014, after Dix resigned as leader of the BC NDP and the 2014 British Columbia New Democratic Party leadership election had begun, Routley endorsed John Horgan. Times Colonist columnist Les Leyne described Routley's persona in the legislature as "a well-meaning old-time union man who knows how give an amusing - and loud - speech." After making critical comments about the Duncan-Cowichan Chamber of Commerce in such a speech in 2014, Routley was forced to apologize. With the 2017 election approaching, the 68 year old Routley opted to retire and not seek reelection. Subsequently, his NDP lost his Cowichan Valley seat to Sonia Furstenau of the Green Party.

== Electoral history ==
2013 British Columbia general election: Cowichan Valley
Party	Candidate	Votes	%	±%	Expenditures
New Democratic	Bill Routley	10,696	40.14	−8.26	$59,185
Liberal	Steve Housser	9,299	34.90	−0.81	$46,299
Green	Kerry Davis	5,102	19.15	+7.36	$19,753
Conservative	Damir Wallener	1,223	4.59	+1.03	$9,705
Independent	Heather Alanna Campbell	326	1.22	–	$1,050
Total valid votes		26,646	100.00	–	
Total rejected ballots		86	0.32	−0.05	
Turnout		26,732	61.90	−0.64	
Registered voters		43,183			
Source: Elections BC

2009 British Columbia general election: Cowichan Valley
Party	Candidate	Votes	%	Expenditures
New Democratic	Bill Routley	12,548	48.40	$83,418
Liberal	Cathy Basskin	9,258	35.71	$55,515
Green	Simon Lindley	3,058	11.79	$8,900
Conservative	Jason Murray	924	3.56	$1,594
Refederation	Michial Rupert Moore	139	0.54	$343
Total valid votes		25,927	100.00	
Total rejected ballots		97	0.37	
Turnout		26,024	62.54	
Registered voters		41,612		
