= Murray Coell =

Canadian politician

Member of the British Columbia Legislative Assembly for Saanich North and the Islands
- In office May 28, 1996 – May 14, 2013
- Preceded by: Clive Tanner
- Succeeded by: Gary Holman

Minister of Human Resources of British Columbia
- In office June 5, 2001 – January 26, 2004
- Premier: Gordon Campbell
- Succeeded by: Stan Hagen

Minister of Community, Aboriginal and Women’s Services of British Columbia
- In office January 26, 2004 – June 16, 2005
- Premier: Gordon Campbell
- Preceded by: George Abbott
- Succeeded by: Tom Christensen (Aboriginal Relations and Reconciliation), Ida Chong (Women’s and Seniors’ Services)

Minister of Advanced Education of British Columbia
- In office June 16, 2005 – June 10, 2009
- Premier: Gordon Campbell
- Preceded by: Ida Chong
- Succeeded by: Moira Stilwell

Minister responsible for Research and Technology of British Columbia
- In office June 16, 2005 – June 23, 2008
- Premier: Gordon Campbell

Minister of Labour Market Development of British Columbia
- In office June 23, 2008 – June 10, 2009
- Premier: Gordon Campbell
- Succeeded by: Moira Stilwell

Minister of Labour of British Columbia
- In office June 10, 2009 – October 25, 2010
- Premier: Gordon Campbell
- Preceded by: Iain Black
- Succeeded by: Iain Black

Minister of Environment of British Columbia
- In office October 25, 2010 – March 14, 2011
- Premier: Gordon Campbell
- Preceded by: Barry Penner
- Succeeded by: Terry Lake

Personal details
- Born: 1954 or 1955 (age 71–72)
- Party: Liberal

Murray Coell (born 1955 or 1954) is a Canadian politician. He is a former member of the British Columbia Legislative Assembly, representing the riding of Saanich North and the Islands, a suburb of Victoria, from 1996 through 2012. He is a BC Liberal. He previously served as the Minister of Environment, Minister of Labour, Minister of Advanced Education and Labour Market Development; Minister of Human Resources; Minister of Community, Aboriginal and Women's Services; and Minister of Advanced Education and Minister Responsible for Research and Technology.

Coell was first elected to the British Columbia legislature in 1996 and has been re-elected in 2001, 2005, and 2009. He announced in 2012 that he would not run for re-election.

Prior to being elected to provincial office, Coell was mayor of Saanich, British Columbia for six years. He has also served as chair of the Capital Regional District. Before entering politics, Coell was a social worker and a small business owner. He has a Bachelor of Arts in social welfare from the University of Victoria.

== Election results ==
1996 British Columbia general election: Saanich North and the Islands
Party	Candidate	Votes	%
Liberal	Murray Coell	13,374	47.57%
New Democratic	Lynda Laushway	10,546	37.51%
Reform	Ross Imrie	1,627	5.79%
Progressive Democrat	Gary Lundy	1,533	5.45%
Green	Wally du Temple	898	3.19%
Natural Law	Paul Tessier	72	0.26%
Western Canada Concept	Zino Del Monte	63	0.22%
Total valid votes		28,113	100.00%
Total rejected ballots		120	0.43%
Turnout		28,233	77.89%

2001 British Columbia general election: Saanich North and the Islands
Party	Candidate	Votes	%
Liberal	Murray Coell	15,406	54.29
Green	Andrew Lewis	7,211	25.41
New Democratic	Paul Sam	5,011	17.66
Marijuana	Christina Racki	491	1.73
Independent	Balther Johannes Jensen	257	0.91

2005 British Columbia general election: Saanich North and the Islands
Party	Candidate	Votes	%
Liberal	Murray Coell	13,265	44.01
New Democratic	Christine Hunt	11,265	37.37
Green	Ken Rouleau	4,557	15.12
Democratic Reform	Ian Douglas Bruce	1,056	3.50

2009 British Columbia general election: Saanich North and the Islands
Party	Candidate	Votes	%	±%
Liberal	Murray Coell	13,120	44.91	+0.9
New Democratic	Gary Holman	12,875	44.07	+6.9
Green	Tom Bradfield	3,220	11.02	−4.1
Total valid votes		29,215		
