= Memory Island Provincial Park =

Provincial park of British Columbia, Canada

- IUCN category II (national park)
- Location within Vancouver Island Location within British Columbia Location within Cowichan Valley Regional District
- Interactive map of Memory Island Provincial Park
- Location: Shawnigan Lake, British Columbia, Canada
- Nearest city: Shawnigan Lake
- Coordinates: 48°36′41″N 123°38′01″W
- Area: 0.915 ha (2.26 acres)
- Established: 23 August 1945
- Governing body: BC Parks
- Website: Memory Island Provincial Park

Memory Island Provincial Park is a provincial park located on Vancouver Island in British Columbia, Canada. It was established by BC Parks on 23 August 1945 to protect a small island located at the southern end of Shawnigan Lake.

== Name origin ==
It was named as a memorial to two Victoria men - Allan Mayhew and Kenneth Scharff - who lost their lives in World War II.

== Geography ==
Covering only 0.915 hectares (2.26 acres), Memory Island is the second smallest provincial park in British Columbia after Seton Portage Historic Provincial Park.
