= Brookes Shawnigan Lake =

Location
- Canada
- Coordinates: 48.6358°N 123.6304°W

Information
- School type: IB World School
- Founded: 2009
- Grades: 7–12
- Enrollment: 150 (2015)
- Website: shawnigan.brookes.org

Brookes Shawnigan Lake is an independent private boarding school located in Shawnigan Lake, British Columbia, Canada. Founded in 2009, originally under the name Dwight International School, it offers the International Baccalaureate diploma program to students from grades 7 through 12. Brookes Shawnigan Lake is a member of the Brookes Education Group, a global family of schools with campuses in Canada, the United Kingdom, the United States, India, Russia, and Korea.

== History ==
Brookes Shawnigan Lake is located on the eastern shore of Shawnigan Lake, on Vancouver Island, British Columbia, Canada. The school's property has been used for educational purposes as far back as 1927, starting as the Strathcona Lodge Girls Boarding School. The Maxwell International Baháʼí School was established on the spot in 1988 by the National Spiritual Assembly of the Baháʼís of Canada in honour of architect William Sutherland Maxwell and his wife May, two of the earliest Baháʼís in Canada. A co-ed Baháʼí school, it offered boarding students and day students instruction from grades 7–12. Its educational philosophy was based on the principles of the Baháʼí Faith. Students attended from all over the world. Maxwell International School closed on its 20th anniversary in 2008.

Dwight International School was founded at the site in 2009 having purchased the Maxwell International property following its closure. Dwight International School became Dwight School Canada in 2012. Dwight School Canada was a member of the global family of Dwight Schools, and in 2015 became one of the founding schools of the Brookes Education Group. Dwight School Canada was re-branded as Brookes Shawnigan Lake in 2016.

== Academics ==
Brookes Shawnigan Lake is a member of the International Baccalaureate Organization and offers the 2 year IB Diploma Programme to graduating students. The school received its IB World School status in February 2010 from Switzerland's International Baccalaureate Organisation. In 2016, Brookes entered the candidacy phase to begin offering the IB Middle Years Programme to grades 7-10, and expects to become fully authorized for this programme by 2018.
