= Gary Holman =

Gary Holman may refer to:

- Gary Holman (baseball) (born 1944), baseball player
- Gary Holman (politician), Canadian politician
