= Sonia Furstenau =

Canadian politician (born 1970)

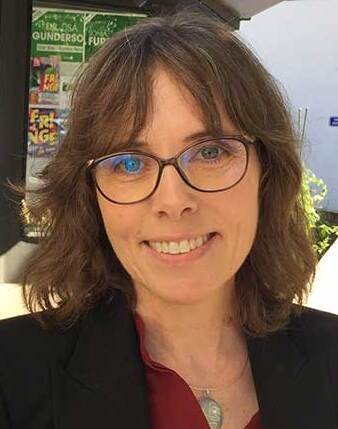
- Furstenau in 2024

Leader of the Green Party of British Columbia
- In office September 14, 2020 – January 28, 2025
- Preceded by: Adam Olsen (interim)
- Succeeded by: Jeremy Valeriote (interim)

Deputy Leader of the Green Party of British Columbia
- In office November 2, 2016 – September 14, 2020 Serving with Jonina Campbell
- Leader: Andrew Weaver
- Preceded by: Adam Olsen
- Succeeded by: Jonina Campbell

Member of the British Columbia Legislative Assembly for Cowichan Valley
- In office May 9, 2017 – September 21, 2024
- Preceded by: Bill Routley
- Succeeded by: Debra Toporowski

Personal details
- Born: June 8, 1970 (age 56) Edmonton, Alberta, Canada
- Party: Green Party of British Columbia
- Spouse: Blaise Salmon
- Children: 1
- Education: University of Victoria
- Profession: High school teacher

Sonia Furstenau (born June 8, 1970) is a Canadian former politician who served as leader of the Green Party of British Columbia from 2020 to 2025. She also served as the MLA for Cowichan Valley from 2017 to 2024; she was defeated after attempting to switch constituencies.

== Early life and career ==
Furstenau was raised in Edmonton, the child of German immigrants. She attended McKernan Elementary/Junior-High School, where she was in Grade 2 in 1977–78. She went on a trip to Germany with her father, including his native East Germany, where she learned to appreciate the value of democracy by observing the lack of it. She later helped her mother protest against dumping in the vicinity of Elk Island National Park in the early 1990s.

Furstenau attended the University of Victoria starting at age 20, attaining an MA in History and a Bachelor of Education. After teaching in Victoria-area schools, her work took her to Shawnigan Lake in 2011. Here she encountered the dumping of toxic soil close to the water supply, which led her to citizen involvement and to becoming a director of the Cowichan Valley Regional District (see below).

Prior to holding elected office, Furstenau was a high school teacher in Victoria and Shawnigan Lake.

== Political career ==
In 2014, Furstenau started her political career when she was elected to serve as a director of Electoral Area B within the Cowichan Valley Regional District. This was after two years working with the Shawnigan Residents' Association to protest and appeal a British Columbia provincial permit that allowed the siting of a landfill on the banks of the community's source of drinking water, Shawnigan Lake.

Furstenau was elected to the Legislative Assembly of British Columbia in the 2017 provincial election to represent the electoral district of Cowichan Valley. On November 2, 2016, Green Party leader Andrew Weaver announced that Furstenau would replace Adam Olsen as one of the deputy leaders of the party. After Weaver stepped down as party leader, Furstenau announced her candidacy for the leadership of the party; she was elected leader on September 14, 2020.

On January 31, 2024, Furstenau announced that she would run in Victoria-Beacon Hill during the 2024 provincial general election. In the election, Furstenau was defeated in the riding of Victoria-Beacon Hill, a long-time NDP stronghold, by NDP incumbent Grace Lore. On October 22, Furstenau announced that she would stay on a BC Green leader and assist in the preparations of the new Green caucus. The Green Party later signed a confidence and supply agreement with the NDP in exchange for policy from the Green platform to be implemented.

On January 28, 2025, she announced her intention to resign as leader of the BC Green Party.

== Personal life ==
Furstenau is married to Blaise Salmon who works as a financial planner and has been elected as the local director for the Mill Bay/Malahat district of the Cowichan Valley Regional District. She raised a child as a single mother while at university, taking on book-keeping jobs to support herself and her child.

== Electoral record ==
2024 British Columbia general election: Victoria-Beacon Hill
Party	Candidate	Votes	%	±%	Expenditures
New Democratic	Grace Lore	13,350	47.34	-7.4	
Green	Sonia Furstenau	9,441	33.48	+3.3	
Conservative	Tim Thielmann	5,410	19.18	–	
Total valid votes		28,201	–		
Total rejected ballots					
Turnout					
Registered voters					
New Democratic notional hold		Swing		-5.4	
Source: Elections BC

2020 British Columbia general election: Cowichan Valley
Party	Candidate	Votes	%	±%	Expenditures
Green	Sonia Furstenau	13,059	44.21	+6.97	$64,313.52
New Democratic	Rob Douglas	11,875	40.20	+8.57	$55,431.43
Liberal	Tanya Kaul	4,606	15.59	–12.07	$15,360.48
Total valid votes		29,540	100.00	–	
Total rejected ballots		150	0.51	+0.18	
Turnout		29,690	59.85	–7.73	
Registered voters		49,606			
Green hold		Swing		–0.80	
Source: Elections BC

2017 British Columbia general election: Cowichan Valley
Party	Candidate	Votes	%	±%	Expenditures
Green	Sonia Furstenau	11,449	37.24	+18.09	$35,322
New Democratic	Lori Lynn Iannidinardo	9,723	31.63	−8.51	$54,416
Liberal	Steve Housser	8,502	27.66	−7.24	$70,112
Independent	Ian Morrison	502	1.63	–	$8,140
Libertarian	James Robert Anderson	302	0.98	–	$398
Independent	Samuel Lockhart	145	0.47	–	$0
Independent	Eden Haythornthwaite	119	0.39	–	$996
Total valid votes		30,742	100.00	–	
Total rejected ballots		100	0.33	+0.01	
Turnout		30,842	67.58	+5.68	
Registered voters		45,641			
Source: Elections BC
