= Gary Holman (politician) =

Canadian politician

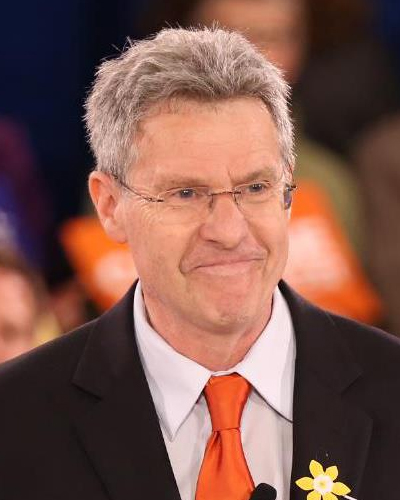
- Gary Holman, April 2013

Member of the British Columbia Legislative Assembly for Saanich North and the Islands
- In office May 14, 2013 – May 9, 2017
- Preceded by: Murray Coell
- Succeeded by: Adam Olsen

Personal details
- Party: New Democratic Party
- Profession: Economist

Gary Holman is a Canadian politician, currently Salt Spring Island Director for the Capital Regional District. He served formerly in the Legislative Assembly of British Columbia from 2013 to 2017. He represented the electoral district of Saanich North and the Islands as a member of the British Columbia New Democratic Party.

Holman narrowly won the seat in the 2013 provincial election, in an almost perfect three-way split with the Liberal and Green candidates. He was defeated in the 2017 election by Adam Olsen, the same Green candidate he had faced in 2013.

He was previously the party's candidate in the same district in the 2009 election, losing narrowly to then-incumbent MLA Murray Coell.

Prior to being an MLA, Holman served for six years as the Capital Regional District director for Salt Spring Island, and is credited for getting the island's first BC Transit bus started. He rejoined the CRD's Board in the 2019 local government elections.

Holman is an economist with a master's degree from Simon Fraser University, and has worked as a consulting economist for various initiatives across BC, including the Nisga'a Treaty.

Holman was the party's lead spokesperson on democratic reform, and the deputy spokesperson for BC Ferries and the environment.

== Electoral record ==
2017 British Columbia general election: Saanich North and the Islands
| Party | Candidate | Votes | % | ±% | Expenditures |
|---|---|---|---|---|---|
| Green | Adam Olsen | 14,775 | 41.95 | +9.88 | $68,851 |
| New Democratic | Gary Holman | 10,764 | 30.56 | −2.71 | $70,266 |
| Liberal | Stephen P. Roberts | 9,321 | 26.46 | −6.30 | $71,305 |
| Independent | Jordan Templeman | 364 | 1.03 | – | $1,127 |
| Total valid votes | | 35,224 | 100.00 | – | |
| Total rejected ballots | | 79 | 0.22 | −0.08 | |
| Turnout | | 35,303 | 74.14 | +4.93 | |
| Registered voters | | 47,615 | | | |
Source: Elections BC

2013 British Columbia general election: Saanich North and the Islands
| Party | Candidate | Votes | % |
|---|---|---|---|
| New Democratic | Gary Holman | 10,515 | 33.27 |
| Liberal | Stephen P. Roberts | 10,352 | 32.76 |
| Green | Adam Olsen | 10,136 | 32.07 |
| Independent | Scott McEachern | 599 | 1.90 |
| Total valid votes | | 31,602 | 100.00 |
| Total rejected ballots | | 94 | 0.30 |
| Turnout | | 31,696 | 69.21 |
Source: Elections BC

2009 British Columbia general election: Saanich North and the Islands
| Party | Candidate | Votes | % | ±% |
|---|---|---|---|---|
| Liberal | Murray Coell | 13,120 | 44.91 | +0.9 |
| New Democratic | Gary Holman | 12,875 | 44.07 | +6.9 |
| Green | Tom Bradfield | 3,220 | 11.02 | −4.1 |
| Total valid votes | | 29,215 | | |
