= Adam Olsen =

Canadian politician

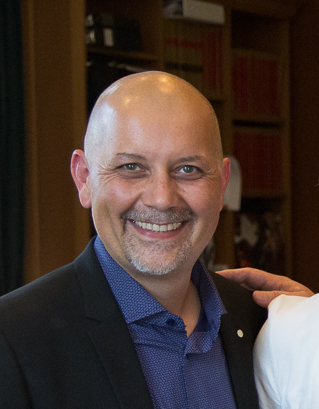
- Olsen in 2017

Interim leader of the Green Party of British Columbia
- In office January 6, 2020 – September 14, 2020
- Preceded by: Andrew Weaver
- Succeeded by: Sonia Furstenau
- In office August 25, 2013 – December 9, 2015
- Preceded by: Jane Sterk
- Succeeded by: Andrew Weaver

Member of the British Columbia Legislative Assembly for Saanich North and the Islands
- In office May 9, 2017 – September 21, 2024
- Preceded by: Gary Holman
- Succeeded by: Rob Botterell

Personal details
- Born: January 10, 1976 (age 50) Brentwood Bay, British Columbia
- Party: Green

Adam Olsen (born January 10, 1976) is a Canadian politician, who was elected to the Legislative Assembly of British Columbia in the 2017 provincial election. He represented the electoral district of Saanich North and the Islands as a member of the Green Party of British Columbia caucus until 2024.

== Political career ==
Olsen was elected to the Legislative Assembly of British Columbia in the general 2017 provincial election in the riding of Saanich North and the Islands. Olsen previously ran in the same district in the 2013 provincial election, losing narrowly to Gary Holman. Following the election, he served as the party's interim leader between the resignation of Jane Sterk and the election of Andrew Weaver.

Olsen joins the first minority government in British Columbia since the 1952 elections. In the 2017 British Columbia general election the Liberal Party won 43 seats, the New Democratic Party won 41 seats, and the Green Party won three seats. As no single party won a majority of seats, the Green Party was approached by both the BC Liberal Party and BC NDP to determine whether they would support a minority government or a coalition government headed by either party. No grand coalition or agreement between the two large parties, excluding the Greens, was seriously considered. On May 29, NDP leader John Horgan and Green leader Andrew Weaver announced that the Greens would provide confidence and supply to an NDP minority government, a position which was endorsed the following day by the members of both caucuses.

On October 7, 2019, Andrew Weaver announced he will step down as party leader once a new leader has been chosen. On December 20, 2019, Olsen was appointed interim leader, following the resignation of Andrew Weaver. He took office effective January 6, 2020.

Olsen is a member of the Tsartlip First Nation in Brentwood Bay and served as a two-term Central Saanich Councillor prior to his election.

== Electoral record ==
2020 British Columbia general election: Saanich North and the Islands
Party	Candidate	Votes	%	±%	Expenditures
Green	Adam Olsen	17,897	51.97	+10.02	$51,642.52
New Democratic	Zeb King	9,990	29.01	−1.55	$39,975.02
Liberal	Stephen P. Roberts	6,547	19.01	−7.45	$38,138.02
Total valid votes		34,434	100.00	–	
Total rejected ballots		159	0.46	+0.24	
Turnout		34,593	67.66	−6.48	
Registered voters		51,126			
Source: Elections BC

2017 British Columbia general election: Saanich North and the Islands
Party	Candidate	Votes	%	±%	Expenditures
Green	Adam Olsen	14,775	41.95	+9.88	$68,851
New Democratic	Gary Holman	10,764	30.56	−2.71	$70,266
Liberal	Stephen P. Roberts	9,321	26.46	−6.30	$71,305
Independent	Jordan Templeman	364	1.03	–	$1,127
Total valid votes		35,224	100.00	–	
Total rejected ballots		79	0.22	−0.08	
Turnout		35,303	74.14	+4.93	
Registered voters		47,615			
Source: Elections BC

2013 British Columbia general election: Saanich North and the Islands
Party	Candidate	Votes	%
New Democratic	Gary Holman	10,515	33.27
Liberal	Stephen P. Roberts	10,352	32.76
Green	Adam Olsen	10,136	32.07
Independent	Scott McEachern	599	1.90
Total valid votes		31,602	100.00
Total rejected ballots		94	0.30
Turnout		31,696	69.21
Source: Elections BC
