= Saanich North and the Islands =

Provincial electoral district in British Columbia, Canada

British Columbia electoral district
- Interactive map of riding boundaries

Provincial electoral district
- Legislature: Legislative Assembly of British Columbia
MLA
Emily Lowan
Green
- First contested: 1991
- Last contested: 2026

Demographics
- Population (2021): 57,901
- Area (km²): 1,506
- Pop. density (per km²): 38.4
- Census division: Capital Regional District
- Census subdivision(s): Central Saanich, East Saanich, North Saanich, Salt Spring Island, Sidney, Southern Gulf Islands

Saanich North and the Islands is a provincial electoral district in British Columbia that has been represented in the Legislative Assembly of British Columbia since 1991.

Established under the 1991 electoral redistribution, the district was first contested in the 1991 general election. It was created following the division of the previous two-member district of Saanich and the Islands.

== Demographics ==
Population, 2021	57,901
Area (km^{2})	1,506
Pop. density (people per km^{2})	38
Source: BC Electoral Boundaries Commission

== Geography ==
Saanich North and the Islands consists of the Southern Gulf Islands as well as the municipalities of North Saanich, Central Saanich, and Sidney on Vancouver Island.

== Members of the Legislative Assembly ==
This riding has elected the following members of the Legislative Assembly:

Assembly	Years	Member	Party
Saanich North and the Islands; Riding created from Saanich and the Islands
35th	1991–1996	Clive Tanner	Liberal
36th	1996–2001	Murray Coell	Liberal
37th	2001–2005	Murray Coell	Liberal
38th	2005–2009	Murray Coell	Liberal
39th	2009–2013	Murray Coell	Liberal
40th	2013–2017	Gary Holman	New Democratic
41st	2017–2020	Adam Olsen	Green
42nd	2020–2024	Adam Olsen	Green
43rd	2024–2026	Rob Botterell	Green
44th	2026–present	Emily Lowan	Green

== Election results ==
2026 British Columbia general election
The 2026 general election will be held on October 24.
Party	Candidate	Votes	%	±%	Expenditures
Green	Emily Lowan				
New Democratic	Kala Bryson				
Conservative	Ryan Windsor				
CentreBC	Richard Smith			–	
Total valid votes					
Total rejected ballots					
Turnout					
Registered voters					
Source: Elections BC

2024 British Columbia general election
Party	Candidate	Votes	%	±%	Expenditures
Green	Rob Botterell	12,308	36.15	−16.8	$183,083.43
New Democratic	Sarah Riddell	10,958	32.19	+3.6	$97,019.73
Conservative	David Busch	10,145	29.79	–	$128,604.88
Independent	Amy Haysom	635	1.87	–	$4,257.36
Total valid votes		34,046	99.88	–	
Total rejected ballots		41	0.12	−0.34	
Turnout		34,087	68.95	+1.29	
Registered voters		49,437			
Green notional hold		Swing		−10.2	
Source: Elections BC

2020 provincial election redistributed results
Party	%
Green	52.9
New Democratic	28.6
Liberal	18.5

2020 British Columbia general election
Party	Candidate	Votes	%	±%	Expenditures
Green	Adam Olsen	17,897	51.97	+10.02	$51,642.52
New Democratic	Zeb King	9,990	29.01	−1.55	$39,975.02
Liberal	Stephen P. Roberts	6,547	19.01	−7.45	$38,138.02
Total valid votes		34,434	100.00	–	
Total rejected ballots		159	0.46	+0.24	
Turnout		34,593	67.66	−6.48	
Registered voters		51,126			
Source: Elections BC

2017 British Columbia general election
Party	Candidate	Votes	%	±%	Expenditures
Green	Adam Olsen	14,775	41.95	+9.88	$68,851
New Democratic	Gary Holman	10,764	30.56	−2.71	$70,266
Liberal	Stephen P. Roberts	9,321	26.46	−6.30	$71,305
Independent	Jordan Templeman	364	1.03	–	$1,127
Total valid votes		35,224	100.00	–	
Total rejected ballots		79	0.22	−0.08	
Turnout		35,303	74.14	+4.93	
Registered voters		47,615			
Source: Elections BC

2013 British Columbia general election
Party	Candidate	Votes	%
New Democratic	Gary Holman	10,515	33.27
Liberal	Stephen P. Roberts	10,352	32.76
Green	Adam Olsen	10,136	32.07
Independent	Scott McEachern	599	1.90
Total valid votes		31,602	100.00
Total rejected ballots		94	0.30
Turnout		31,696	69.21
Source: Elections BC

2009 British Columbia general election
Party	Candidate	Votes	%	±%
Liberal	Murray Coell	13,120	44.91	+0.9
New Democratic	Gary Holman	12,875	44.07	+6.9
Green	Tom Bradfield	3,220	11.02	−4.1
Total valid votes		29,215		

2005 British Columbia general election
Party	Candidate	Votes	%
Liberal	Murray Coell	13,265	44.01
New Democratic	Christine Hunt	11,265	37.37
Green	Ken Rouleau	4,557	15.12
Democratic Reform	Ian Douglas Bruce	1,056	3.50

2001 British Columbia general election
Party	Candidate	Votes	%
Liberal	Murray Coell	15,406	54.29
Green	Andrew Lewis	7,211	25.41
New Democratic	Paul Sam	5,011	17.66
Marijuana	Christina Racki	491	1.73
Independent	Balther Johannes Jensen	257	0.91

1996 British Columbia general election
Party	Candidate	Votes	%
Liberal	Murray Coell	13,374	47.57%
New Democratic	Lynda Laushway	10,546	37.51%
Reform	Ross Imrie	1,627	5.79%
Progressive Democrat	Gary Lundy	1,533	5.45%
Green	Wally du Temple	898	3.19%
Natural Law	Paul Tessier	72	0.26%
Western Canada Concept	Zino Del Monte	63	0.22%
Total valid votes		28,113	100.00%
Total rejected ballots		120	0.43%
Turnout		28,233	77.89%

1991 British Columbia general election
Party	Candidate	Votes	%
Liberal	Clive Tanner	13,633	52.53
New Democratic	Elsie McMurphy	8,745	33.70
Social Credit	Richard Holmes	2,917	11.24
Reform	Don Hutchings	557	2.15
Family Coalition	Thomas Aussenegg	99	0.38
Total valid votes		25,951	100.00
Total rejected ballots		307	1.17
Turnout		26,258	82.31

== See also ==
- List of British Columbia provincial electoral districts
- Canadian provincial electoral districts
