= Cowichan Valley (electoral district) =

Provincial electoral district in British Columbia, Canada

British Columbia electoral district
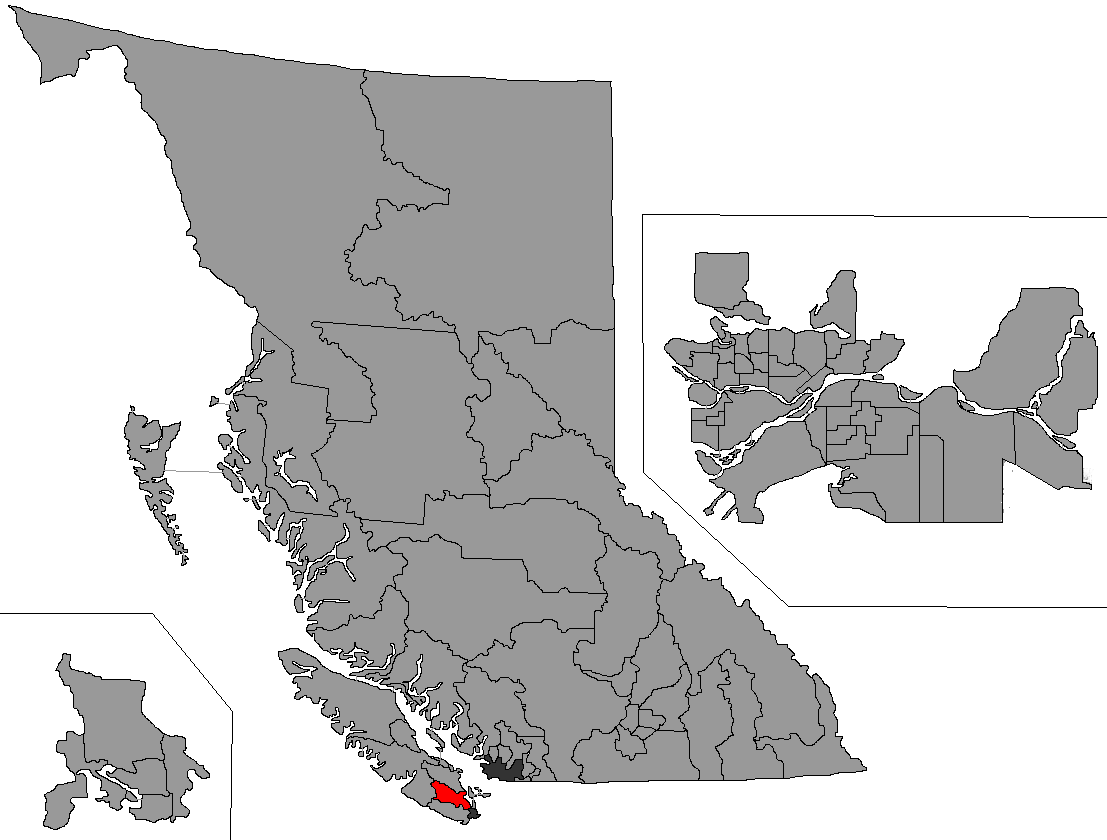

Provincial electoral district
- Legislature: Legislative Assembly of British Columbia
MLA
Bert Chen
Conservative
- District created: 2008
- First contested: 2009
- Last contested: 2026

Demographics
- Population (2006): 55,040
- Area (km²): 1,681.67
- Pop. density (per km²): 32.7
- Census division: Cowichan Valley Regional District
- Census subdivision(s): Duncan, North Cowichan, Lake Cowichan

Cowichan Valley is a provincial electoral district in British Columbia, Canada, established by the Electoral Districts Act, 2008 out of parts of Cowichan-Ladysmith and Malahat-Juan de Fuca. It was first contested in the 2009 general election in which New Democrat Bill Routley was elected MLA.

== Geography ==
Cowichan Valley is located on southern Vancouver Island, in the region surrounding the Cowichan River. Communities in the electoral district consist of Duncan, Lake Cowichan, Shawnigan Lake, Mill Bay, Cobble Hill, Maple Bay, and the southern portion of North Cowichan.

== Members of the Legislative Assembly ==
Cowichan Valley
Assembly	Years	Member	Party
Riding created from Cowichan-Ladysmith and Malahat-Juan de Fuca
39th	2009–2013	Bill Routley	New Democratic
40th	2013–2017	Bill Routley	New Democratic
41st	2017–2020	Sonia Furstenau	Green
42nd	2020–2024	Sonia Furstenau	Green
43rd	2024–2026	Debra Toporowski	New Democratic
44th	2026–present	Bert Chen	Conservative

== Election results ==
View source data.

2026 British Columbia general election
Party	Candidate	Votes	%	±%	Expenditures
Conservative	Bert Chen	11,100	42.79	+5.20	
New Democratic	Debra Toporowski	10,949	42.21	+1.70	
Green	Justin Douglas	3,750	14.46	-5.37	
Communist	James Chumsa	100	0.39	-	
Total valid votes		25,899	99.84		
Total rejected ballots		41	0.16		
Turnout					
Registered voters					
Conservative gain from New Democratic		Swing		+3.45	
Source: Elections BC

2024 British Columbia general election
Party	Candidate	Votes	%	±%	Expenditures
New Democratic	Debra Toporowski	11,795	40.51	-4.2	$58,842.93
Conservative	John Koury	10,946	37.59	–	$22,324.63
Green	Cammy Lockwood	5,773	19.83	-19.1	$37,278.36
Independent	Eden Haythornthwaite	341	1.17	–	$5,153.95
Unaffiliated	Jon Coleman	263	0.90	–	$2,574.59
Total valid votes/expense limit		29,118	99.87	–	$71,700.08
Total rejected ballots		39	0.13	–	
Turnout		29,157	63.52	–	
Registered voters		45,901			
New Democratic notional hold		Swing		–	
Source: Elections BC

2020 provincial election redistributed results
Party	%
New Democratic	44.7
Green	38.9
Liberal	16.4

2020 British Columbia general election: Cowichan Valley
Party	Candidate	Votes	%	±%	Expenditures
Green	Sonia Furstenau	13,059	44.21	+6.97	$64,313.52
New Democratic	Rob Douglas	11,875	40.20	+8.57	$55,431.43
Liberal	Tanya Kaul	4,606	15.59	–12.07	$15,360.48
Total valid votes		29,540	100.00	–	
Total rejected ballots		150	0.51	+0.18	
Turnout		29,690	59.85	–7.73	
Registered voters		49,606			
Green hold		Swing		–0.80	
Source: Elections BC

2017 British Columbia general election: Cowichan Valley
Party	Candidate	Votes	%	±%	Expenditures
Green	Sonia Furstenau	11,449	37.24	+18.09	$35,322
New Democratic	Lori Lynn Iannidinardo	9,723	31.63	−8.51	$54,416
Liberal	Steve Housser	8,502	27.66	−7.24	$70,112
Independent	Ian Morrison	502	1.63	–	$8,140
Libertarian	James Robert Anderson	302	0.98	–	$398
Independent	Samuel Lockhart	145	0.47	–	$0
Independent	Eden Haythornthwaite	119	0.39	–	$996
Total valid votes		30,742	100.00	–	
Total rejected ballots		100	0.33	+0.01	
Turnout		30,842	67.58	+5.68	
Registered voters		45,641			
Source: Elections BC

2013 British Columbia general election: Cowichan Valley
Party	Candidate	Votes	%	±%	Expenditures
New Democratic	Bill Routley	10,696	40.14	−8.26	$59,185
Liberal	Steve Housser	9,299	34.90	−0.81	$46,299
Green	Kerry Davis	5,102	19.15	+7.36	$19,753
Conservative	Damir Wallener	1,223	4.59	+1.03	$9,705
Independent	Heather Alanna Campbell	326	1.22	–	$1,050
Total valid votes		26,646	100.00	–	
Total rejected ballots		86	0.32	−0.05	
Turnout		26,732	61.90	−0.64	
Registered voters		43,183			
Source: Elections BC

2009 British Columbia general election: Cowichan Valley
Party	Candidate	Votes	%	Expenditures
New Democratic	Bill Routley	12,548	48.40	$83,418
Liberal	Cathy Basskin	9,258	35.71	$55,515
Green	Simon Lindley	3,058	11.79	$8,900
Conservative	Jason Murray	924	3.56	$1,594
Refederation	Michial Rupert Moore	139	0.54	$343
Total valid votes		25,927	100.00	
Total rejected ballots		97	0.37	
Turnout		26,024	62.54	
Registered voters		41,612		

== See also ==
- List of British Columbia provincial electoral districts
- Canadian provincial electoral districts
