= Shawnigan Lake (British Columbia) =

Body of water in British Columbia, Canada

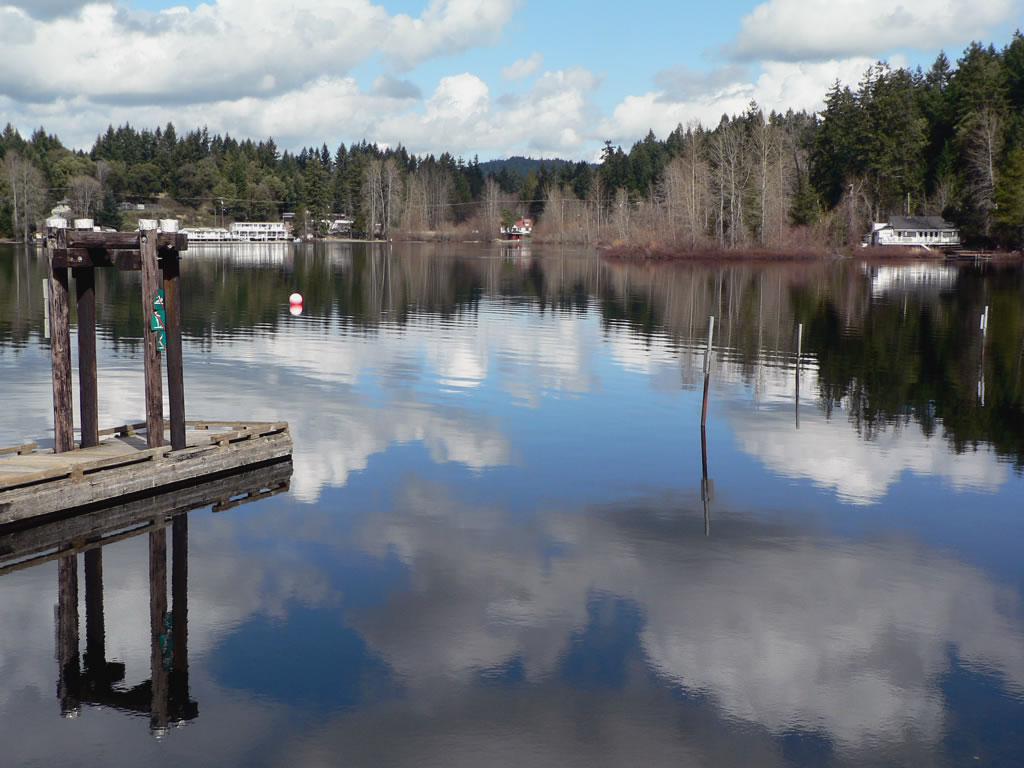

- Location within Vancouver Island
- Location: Vancouver Island, British Columbia
- Coordinates: 48°37′40″N 123°38′20″W
- Basin countries: Canada

Shawnigan Lake is a lake on southern Vancouver Island, located to the west of Saanich Inlet and to the south of the Cowichan Valley region. Its aboriginal name in the Hul'qumi'num language is Showe'luqun.

== Geology and soils ==
Bedrock around the southern two-thirds of the lake is meta-igneous rock of Lower Paleozoic age which is rich in mafic minerals except along southeastern shores where felsic minerals dominate. Bands of marble up to several meters thick are scattered within this metamorphic complex. Around northern shores are volcanic rocks of variable composition from the Jurassic period.

Soils around the lake are mostly well drained or rapidly drained gravelly sandy loams or gravelly loamy sands with brown podzolic profile development. Some meet the definition of podzols under the current Canadian system of soil classification. A small area of peat lies near the southern end of the community of Shawnigan Lake.

== Ecology ==
Fish in the lake include rainbow trout, cutthroat trout, kokanee salmon and smallmouth bass. Their populations are sufficient to support a recreational fishery.

== Features ==
Memory Island Provincial Park, a small islet in the lake, was founded in memorial to two Lake residents lost during the Second World War. Also, a local park (Old Mill Park) contains the remains of a lumber mill that was built to support the fledgling village when it was founded nearly one hundred years ago. The mill burned in a fire several years after construction, and the old wooden supports from the mill are still visible in the lake.

== Climate ==
Climate data for Shawnigan Lake, 1981–2010 normals
Month	Jan	Feb	Mar	Apr	May	Jun	Jul	Aug	Sep	Oct	Nov	Dec	Year
Record high °C (°F)	15.0 (59.0)	18.3 (64.9)	22.2 (72.0)	30.0 (86.0)	33.9 (93.0)	35.6 (96.1)	37.2 (99.0)	36.1 (97.0)	33.5 (92.3)	28.3 (82.9)	20.0 (68.0)	16.0 (60.8)	37.2 (99.0)
Mean daily maximum °C (°F)	6.3 (43.3)	7.8 (46.0)	10.4 (50.7)	13.6 (56.5)	17.2 (63.0)	20.2 (68.4)	23.3 (73.9)	23.6 (74.5)	20.5 (68.9)	14.1 (57.4)	8.5 (47.3)	5.6 (42.1)	14.3 (57.7)
Daily mean °C (°F)	3.4 (38.1)	4.1 (39.4)	6.1 (43.0)	8.7 (47.7)	12.1 (53.8)	15.1 (59.2)	17.7 (63.9)	17.9 (64.2)	14.9 (58.8)	10.0 (50.0)	5.6 (42.1)	3.1 (37.6)	9.9 (49.8)
Mean daily minimum °C (°F)	0.5 (32.9)	0.4 (32.7)	1.7 (35.1)	3.8 (38.8)	7.0 (44.6)	10.0 (50.0)	12.0 (53.6)	12.0 (53.6)	9.3 (48.7)	5.8 (42.4)	2.6 (36.7)	0.5 (32.9)	5.5 (41.9)
Record low °C (°F)	−21.1 (−6.0)	−16.7 (1.9)	−11.7 (10.9)	−5.6 (21.9)	−3.9 (25.0)	0.0 (32.0)	3.9 (39.0)	3.3 (37.9)	−3.9 (25.0)	−7.2 (19.0)	−15.6 (3.9)	−15 (5)	−21.1 (−6.0)
Average precipitation mm (inches)	215.3 (8.48)	134.7 (5.30)	119.2 (4.69)	71.0 (2.80)	50.6 (1.99)	40.0 (1.57)	23.2 (0.91)	27.9 (1.10)	33.3 (1.31)	114.7 (4.52)	225.4 (8.87)	194.6 (7.66)	1,250 (49.21)
Average rainfall mm (inches)	195.1 (7.68)	120.7 (4.75)	112.5 (4.43)	70.9 (2.79)	50.6 (1.99)	40.0 (1.57)	23.2 (0.91)	27.9 (1.10)	33.3 (1.31)	114.1 (4.49)	214.2 (8.43)	179.7 (7.07)	1,182.2 (46.52)
Average snowfall cm (inches)	20.3 (8.0)	14.1 (5.6)	6.8 (2.7)	0.1 (0.0)	0.0 (0.0)	0.0 (0.0)	0.0 (0.0)	0.0 (0.0)	0.0 (0.0)	0.7 (0.3)	11.2 (4.4)	14.9 (5.9)	67.9 (26.7)
Average precipitation days (≥ 0.2 mm)	20.4	16.3	18.7	16.4	13.7	10.5	6.1	5.9	8.2	15.6	21.6	20.0	173.3
Average rainy days (≥ 0.2 mm)	18.9	15.2	18.3	16.4	13.7	10.5	6.1	5.9	8.2	15.5	20.9	18.8	168.4
Average snowy days (≥ 0.2 cm)	3.0	2.2	1.2	0.04	0.0	0.0	0.0	0.0	0.0	0.08	1.4	3.1	11.02
Source: Environment Canada

== See also ==
- List of lakes of British Columbia
