= Shawnigan Lake, British Columbia =

Village in British Columbia, Canada

Shawnigan Lake
- Location of Shawnigan Lake in British Columbia Shawnigan Lake (British Columbia)
- Coordinates: 48°39′13″N 123°37′23″W
- Country: Canada
- Province: British Columbia

Government
  - Area Director: Sierra Acton

Population (2016)
  - Total: 8,558
  - Density: 27.9/km^{2} (72/sq mi)
- Postal code: V8H & V0R 2W0

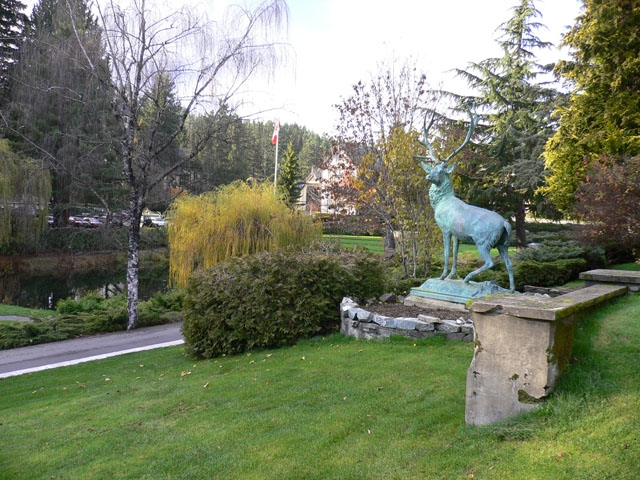
Shawnigan Lake School

Shawnigan Lake is the name of a village on British Columbia's Vancouver Island. The name Shawnigan is an adaptation of the Hul'qumi'num name Showe'luqun, for the lake and the village. It is part of Electoral Area B in the Cowichan Valley Regional District. As of 2016, the permanent population of Shawnigan Lake is 8,558.

A popular recreation destination, its population typically doubles during the summer, as the lake and village are summer vacation spots for residents of Vancouver Island.

== History ==
In 1883, construction of a railway line between Esquimalt and Nanaimo began. Prior to that, Shawnigan Lake was largely unsettled and the only supplies were delivered by a weekly steamship to Cowichan Bay. In 1886, John A. Macdonald traveled to Shawnigan to personally hammer in the last spike at Cliffside. With the new influx of supplies, settlers, and visitors Shawnigan Lake quickly grew. A mill was started in 1890 by a former E & N railway employee. By 1900, the other main industry was tourism, with two hotels being built in Shawnigan for the visitors who would take the train up from Victoria. Shawnigan Lake's forestry industry closed in the mid-twentieth century due to both the loss of the mill, which was destroyed by fire (for the third time) and decreased demand. Portions of the mill can still be seen in Shawnigan's Old Mill Park. The main railway, no longer active as of 2011, served the community twice daily (once northbound, and once southbound) and was a passenger-only train service operated by Via Rail Canada.

== Geography ==
Shawnigan Lake is located approximately 48 km (30 mi) north of Victoria, and borders the communities of Cobble Hill and Mill Bay. Several new residential developments have been built, both in the Shawnigan Lake area as well as in surrounding areas. The village of Shawnigan Lake, located on the eastern shore, contains two small general stores, three restaurants, several beaches and various small businesses including a barber, gas station, pharmacy and two coffee shops. There is a museum, run by the Shawnigan Lake Historical Society. The north-west end of the village also includes many summer cabins and a large lakeside park. The south end of the lake is largely undeveloped, discounting the lakeshore itself, with scattered farmland and numerous hiking trails.

Residents of Shawnigan Lake also have access to nearby communities such as Mill Bay and Langford and Duncan that offer more shopping, employment, and educational opportunities.

== Schools ==
With the exception of two private boarding schools, Shawnigan Lake School and St John's Academy the site of former schools Brooke's Shawnigan Lake Dwight School Canada and Maxwell International School), the area's only remaining school, Discovery Elementary, is located at the north end of the lake. Elsie Miles Elementary, located within the village proper, was closed in mid-2006 due to age and declining enrollment.

== Attractions ==
The west end of Shawnigan Lake sits on an abandoned CN Rail line that was torn up in the 1980s. This line includes the historic Kinsol Trestle which stands as one of the world's largest wooden railway trestles, has been rehabilitated by the Cowichan Valley Regional District (CVRD) along with the help of local residents, which included many fundraising efforts. It was opened to the public in the summer of 2011.

Old Mill Park on the east side is a popular beach for swimming. Shawnigan Lake has no significant parkland outside of the park noted above, a Provincial Park on the west side, and one small regional park in the village itself. Several beaches and small day-use areas are scattered around the lake, and a large island in the south end of the lake, dubbed 'Memory Island' in honor of two lake residents that were lost in World War II, is one such area.

The Shawnigan Lake Museum, located in the heart of the village, has been operating since 1983.

George Pringle Memorial Camp, now Camp Pringle, was founded in 1950 as a tribute to Rev. George Charles Fraser Pringle 1874–1949. Camp Pringle provides week-long vacations for children and youth of all denominations. George Pringle was born in Galt, Ontario. His father George was a shoemaker born in Edinburgh, Scotland, a descendant of the Pringles of Earlston. His mother, Mary Cowan was born in Prince Edward Island. He was a Presbyterian minister (though Camp Pringle is and was under the auspices of the United Church of Canada) and an author. He sought adventure during the Yukon gold rush, served in Atlin, in northern British Columbia, also as a chaplain overseas, during the World War I, and was in charge of the Loggers Mission in British Columbia. From his boat "Sky Pilot" he ministered to some 75 logging camps and communities. George died in Vancouver in 1949 and is buried in Mountain View Cemetery (Vancouver).

== Climate ==
Climate data for Shawnigan Lake, 1981–2010 normals
Month	Jan	Feb	Mar	Apr	May	Jun	Jul	Aug	Sep	Oct	Nov	Dec	Year
Record high °C (°F)	15.0 (59.0)	18.3 (64.9)	22.2 (72.0)	30.0 (86.0)	33.9 (93.0)	35.6 (96.1)	37.2 (99.0)	36.1 (97.0)	33.5 (92.3)	28.3 (82.9)	20.0 (68.0)	16.0 (60.8)	37.2 (99.0)
Mean daily maximum °C (°F)	6.3 (43.3)	7.8 (46.0)	10.4 (50.7)	13.6 (56.5)	17.2 (63.0)	20.2 (68.4)	23.3 (73.9)	23.6 (74.5)	20.5 (68.9)	14.1 (57.4)	8.5 (47.3)	5.6 (42.1)	14.3 (57.7)
Daily mean °C (°F)	3.4 (38.1)	4.1 (39.4)	6.1 (43.0)	8.7 (47.7)	12.1 (53.8)	15.1 (59.2)	17.7 (63.9)	17.9 (64.2)	14.9 (58.8)	10.0 (50.0)	5.6 (42.1)	3.1 (37.6)	9.9 (49.8)
Mean daily minimum °C (°F)	0.5 (32.9)	0.4 (32.7)	1.7 (35.1)	3.8 (38.8)	7.0 (44.6)	10.0 (50.0)	12.0 (53.6)	12.0 (53.6)	9.3 (48.7)	5.8 (42.4)	2.6 (36.7)	0.5 (32.9)	5.5 (41.9)
Record low °C (°F)	−21.1 (−6.0)	−16.7 (1.9)	−11.7 (10.9)	−5.6 (21.9)	−3.9 (25.0)	0.0 (32.0)	3.9 (39.0)	3.3 (37.9)	−3.9 (25.0)	−7.2 (19.0)	−15.6 (3.9)	−15 (5)	−21.1 (−6.0)
Average precipitation mm (inches)	215.3 (8.48)	134.7 (5.30)	119.2 (4.69)	71.0 (2.80)	50.6 (1.99)	40.0 (1.57)	23.2 (0.91)	27.9 (1.10)	33.3 (1.31)	114.7 (4.52)	225.4 (8.87)	194.6 (7.66)	1,250 (49.21)
Average rainfall mm (inches)	195.1 (7.68)	120.7 (4.75)	112.5 (4.43)	70.9 (2.79)	50.6 (1.99)	40.0 (1.57)	23.2 (0.91)	27.9 (1.10)	33.3 (1.31)	114.1 (4.49)	214.2 (8.43)	179.7 (7.07)	1,182.2 (46.52)
Average snowfall cm (inches)	20.3 (8.0)	14.1 (5.6)	6.8 (2.7)	0.1 (0.0)	0.0 (0.0)	0.0 (0.0)	0.0 (0.0)	0.0 (0.0)	0.0 (0.0)	0.7 (0.3)	11.2 (4.4)	14.9 (5.9)	67.9 (26.7)
Average precipitation days (≥ 0.2 mm)	20.4	16.3	18.7	16.4	13.7	10.5	6.1	5.9	8.2	15.6	21.6	20.0	173.3
Average rainy days (≥ 0.2 mm)	18.9	15.2	18.3	16.4	13.7	10.5	6.1	5.9	8.2	15.5	20.9	18.8	168.4
Average snowy days (≥ 0.2 cm)	3.0	2.2	1.2	0.04	0.0	0.0	0.0	0.0	0.0	0.08	1.4	3.1	11.02
Source: Environment Canada

== Notable residents ==
- E. J. Hughes (1913–2007), a local artist. He was awarded the Order of Canada in 2001.
- Sonia Furstenau, MLA for Cowichan Valley
