= Green Party of British Columbia =

Provincial political party in Canada

- Leader: Emily Lowan
- Founded: 1983; 43 years ago
- Headquarters: Victoria, British Columbia
- Membership (2025): ▲8,641
- Ideology: Green politics
- Seats in the Legislative Assembly: 2 / 93

Website
- bcgreens.ca

The Green Party of British Columbia, or simply the BC Greens, is a provincial political party in British Columbia, Canada. It was founded in 1983 and is based in Victoria. The party won its first seat in the Legislative Assembly of British Columbia in the 2013 provincial election.

== Principles ==
The Green Party of BC promotes the principles of participatory democracy, sustainability, social justice, respect for diversity, ecological wisdom, and nonviolence.

== History ==
=== Founding and early years (1983–1992) ===
The first Green Party in North America was formed in British Columbia, Canada on February 6, 1983. It registered as a provincial society and a political party shortly before the 1983 provincial election. It fielded four candidates and received 0.19% of the vote under the leadership of Adriane Carr. In a federal by-election in the riding of Mission—Port Moody the same year, Betty Nickerson was the Green Party of Canada's first federal candidate, but the party's status was not yet recognized by Elections Canada. She appears in electoral records as an "independent" candidate.

Carr stepped back from active involvement in the party in 1985, and the party abolished the position of leader. Thereafter, it was represented in the media by three spokespersons. In the 1986 provincial election, the party won 0.23% of the vote and fielded nine candidates. In 1988, in response to a proposal to field only female candidates in the following election, Carr and her husband Paul George returned briefly to active involvement to defeat the proposal. From 1988 to 1992, the party was deeply divided between supporters of Carr and Greenpeace founder Jim Bohlen and its Ecofeminist Caucus. During this period, its internal politics were dominated by a compromise faction led by electoral reform activist Steve Kisby.

However, this period of relative stability ended with the party's failure to make a breakthrough in the 1991 provincial election, despite increasing its province-wide vote share to 0.86% and fielding a slate of 42 candidates.

=== Parker years (1993–1999) ===
In 1993, the party elected a new leader, 21-year-old Stuart Parker, who revitalized the party with youthful new members. He managed to take the party to running close to a full slate in the 1996 election, but was only able to garner only 2% support province-wide, despite receiving the endorsement of prominent environmentalist David Suzuki. Green hopes for a breakthrough in the Kootenay riding of Nelson-Creston with candidate Andy Shadrack yielded a result of only 11%. Parker's first term (1993–96) was characterized by near-continuous touring of rural BC which had, up to that point, negligible or highly intermittent organization outside of the Okanagan and Comox Valleys. This touring paid off in yielding on-going organization throughout the province, enabling the party to come just four candidates short of a full slate.

The direction of the party under Parker was set by many disgruntled ex–British Columbia New Democratic Party members, and the policies of the party under Parker were notably leftist. During Parker's second term as leader, the party rose to a peak of 11% in public opinion polls between 1996 and 1999, almost exclusively at the NDP's expense. Although he was arrested in logging road blockades in 1993 and 1997, Parker's Greens actually invested more resources in opposing the BC Benefits package of welfare reforms and working on other social issues than it did on any significant environmental issue.

While remaining sharply critical of Glen Clark's NDP government, Parker spearheaded highly controversial negotiations to form municipal electoral alliances with NDP-affiliated parties in 1998 after vote-splitting all but wiped out leftist representation at the local level in Vancouver and Victoria in 1996. These negotiations, approved by Clark, yielded tripartite agreements between local labour councils, Greens and New Democrats in Vancouver and Victoria, leading to Red-Green coalitions contesting the 1999 municipal elections in both cities with the support of organized labour. Neither coalition formed government but both made substantial gains, resulting in the election in Victoria, BC, of Art Vanden Berg, the first person in Canadian history to run as a Green and be elected to City Council. In Vancouver, the coalition effort also elected Parks Commissioner Roslyn Cassells.

=== Carr years (2000–2006) ===
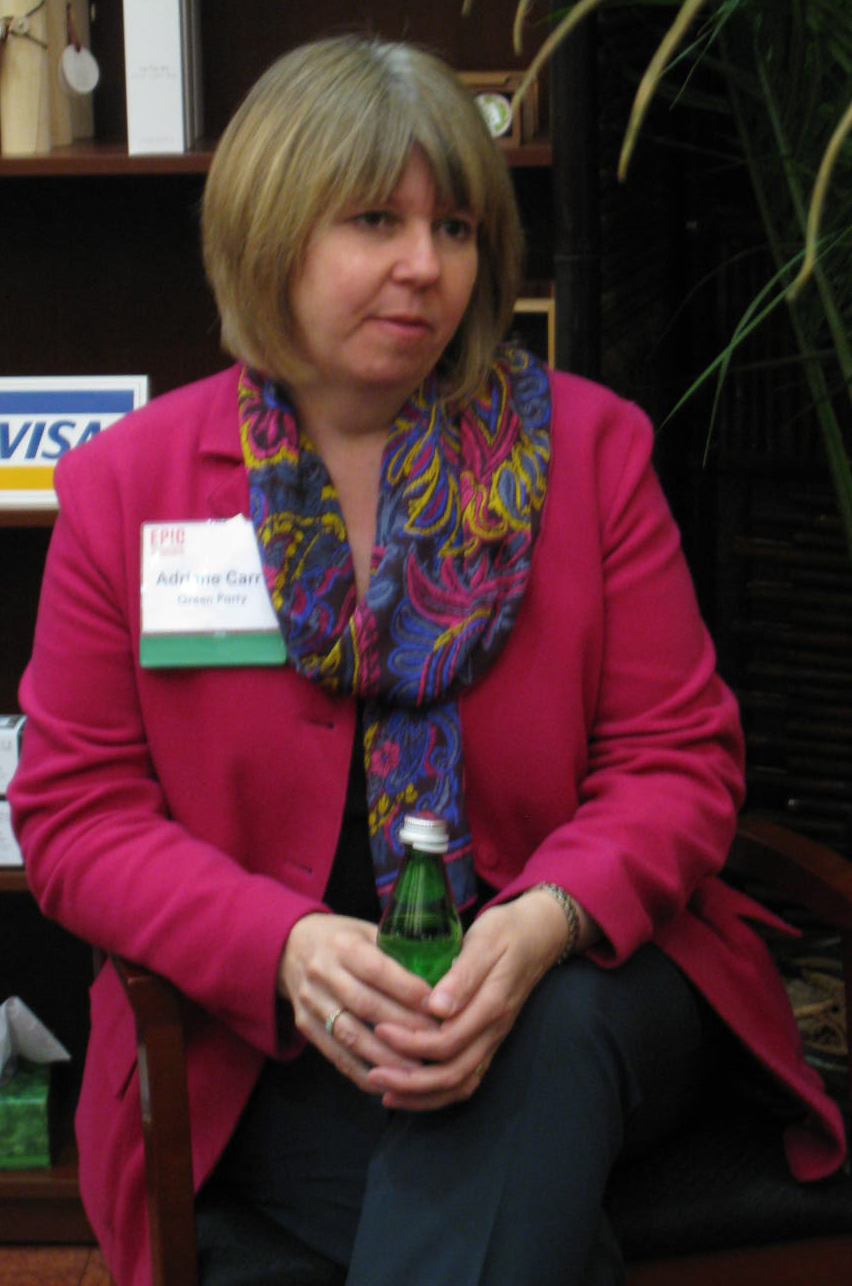
Adriane Carr, party founder and leader (1983–1985, 2000–2006)

The party's increased poll standing, new position on collaboration with its longtime rivals and impending electoral success attracted the attention of a number of prominent environmentalists, led by Carr, who began a campaign in 1999 to remove the party's then leadership. The group conducted a bitter year-long public campaign that included an unsuccessful lawsuit against the party and later-disproven allegations against the party's leader and board of directors including fraud, vote-rigging and even theft. Although the group was defeated at the party's 1999 convention, it triumphed in 2000. Shortly thereafter, the party elected Carr as its new leader; since 2001, the party leader has ceased to be subject to annual review votes, the process by which Parker was removed. Following the 2000 convention, all of the party's elected municipal representatives and some other members resigned.

With the high-profile changes at the top, the party was able to improve on its 9% poll standing at the beginning of 2000 and reached 12% of the popular vote in the May 2001 provincial election. In spite of that significant support, it won no seats in the provincial legislature – a fact which has been cited as an argument against the first-past-the-post voting system used in BC elections.

Although she had sponsored a series of resolutions at the party's 2000 convention condemning what many saw as the party's distraction with social and governance policy at the expense of work on environmental issues, electoral reform moved to the top of Carr's agenda as leader. Disagreeing with Fair Voting BC's decision to devote the movement's energies to backing the new BC Liberal government's plan to move forward with the Citizens' Assembly process it had developed in 1997, Carr founded a rival electoral reform organization called Free Your Vote to utilize the province's citizen initiative legislation (which technically allows citizens to force referendums on legislation if they gather a sufficient number of signatures).

Despite facing public condemnation from FVBC's Loenen, Free Your Vote recruited hundreds of volunteers for the province-wide effort, building a far larger citizen organization than either ECCO or FVBC. It also gained the support of many leftists, including the official endorsement of the BC Nurses' and other unions. The campaign also faced its share of difficulties, such as leaked internal memos from the party's organizing chair explaining that organizers knew the petition drive would fail, but were simply using it to build the party's organizational base. Although the campaign only submitted enough signatures in four of the province's 79 ridings, Free Your Vote was successful in mobilizing new support for reform. But it also appears to have hardened the party's support for a single model of proportional representation (mixed-member, closed-list) and public condemnation of others.

Following the failure of her preferred Free Your Vote, Carr focused her energy on a lively province-wide campaign opposing the 2010 Winter Olympic Games bid. But once the games were awarded to BC, the party was unable to find province-wide issues that resonated strongly with voters. Between 2003 and 2005, the party's presence was notably low key as Carr returned to the constant touring mode that had characterized Parker's first term.

In the 2005 provincial election, the GPBC's vote declined to 9% province-wide from 12% four years previously. Despite being rated highly for her debate performance by media commentators, Carr's performance was poorly rated by the public and her own vote share declined to 25% in her home constituency of Powell River-Sunshine Coast, 17% behind the victorious NDP candidate. Only in the constituencies of Vancouver-Burrard, West Vancouver-Garibaldi and Kelowna-Mission did the party's popularity increase.

These measures seemed insufficient to quiet increasing internal dissatisfaction with her leadership. Prior to the first annual convention following the reinstitution of the practice of requiring leaders to step down and run to succeed themselves each electoral cycle (this policy, along with annual confidence votes, had been previously repealed in 2001), Carr announced her resignation on September 24, 2006. As predicted by those familiar with Carr's long-standing relationship with the newly elected Green Party of Canada leader Elizabeth May, Carr accepted the paid position of deputy leader of the Green Party of Canada. She then ran as a federal candidate in the riding of Vancouver Centre but did not win.

=== Sterk and Weaver (2007–2020) ===
Andrew Weaver in conversation with Silver Donald Cameron

The Green Party of British Columbia held a leadership election on October 21, 2007, after the resignation of Carr in September 2006. Christopher Bennett was appointed interim leader until the leadership election was held. Former Vancouver-Hastings candidate Ian Gregson was the first to announce his candidacy.

Jane Sterk, a municipal councillor, university professor and small business owner, was elected leader of the BC Greens at their 2007 Convention at Royal Roads University in Victoria. She assumed the role from interim leader Christopher Ian Bennett.

The Greens maintain they receive support from all over the political spectrum. In the federal election of 2004, former Social Credit Member of the Legislative Assembly (MLA) and media personality Rafe Mair confounded many by openly supporting the Green Party. The Greens have often been labelled as right-wing at the same time as being labelled left-wing by opponents.

The Greens' strength is concentrated on Southern Vancouver Island and the Gulf Islands, The Okanagan, Sea-to-Sky region and in high density areas of Vancouver. In 1991, the party's strongest showing was 4.4% in Rossland-Trail; in 1996, 11% in Nelson-Creston, in 2001 and 2005, in Carr's riding of Powell River-Sunshine Coast where she received 27% and 25% respectively, and in 2009 in West Vancouver-Sea-to-Sky with 22%.

The Greens won their first ever seat with Andrew Weaver winning in Oak Bay-Gordon Head in the May 2013 general election. Despite a slight drop in overall popular vote, the party climbed to 11.15% in the 61 ridings where they ran candidates. Weaver won 40% of the vote in his riding, and the party also surpassed 20% of the vote in Esquimalt-Royal Roads, Nelson-Creston, Saanich North and the Islands, Victoria-Beacon Hill, and Victoria-Swan Lake.

On August 13, 2013, Sterk announced she would retire from politics after the 2013 Annual General Meeting, held on August 24, 2013. Adam Olsen, former candidate in Saanich North and the Islands served as interim leader until December 9, 2015, when Weaver was acclaimed to the full-time position.

In the May 2017 general election, Weaver, Adam Olsen and Sonia Furstenau were elected to the provincial legislature, with the party winning 16.84% of the popular vote. The Green Party signed a confidence and supply agreement with the NDP in exchange for policy concessions on environmental and social issues. The NDP and Greens then defeated the incumbent Liberal government by one vote in a no confidence vote, with the NDP then being invited to form government.

On October 7, 2019, Andrew Weaver announced he would step down as party leader once a new leader had been chosen and would not run in the next British Columbia election anticipated to take place in 2021. On December 20, 2019, Olsen was named interim leader, effective January 6, 2020. On January 16, 2020, Weaver resigned from caucus to sit as an independent member of the legislature.

The party was scheduled to hold a leadership election from June 15 to 26, 2020, but the election was postponed indefinitely due to the COVID-19 pandemic in British Columbia. It had been planned that the winner would be announced at the party's convention in Nanaimo. The leadership contest was relaunched on June 15, 2020. Sonia Furstenau was elected as leader on September 14, 2020.

=== Furstenau (2020–2025) ===
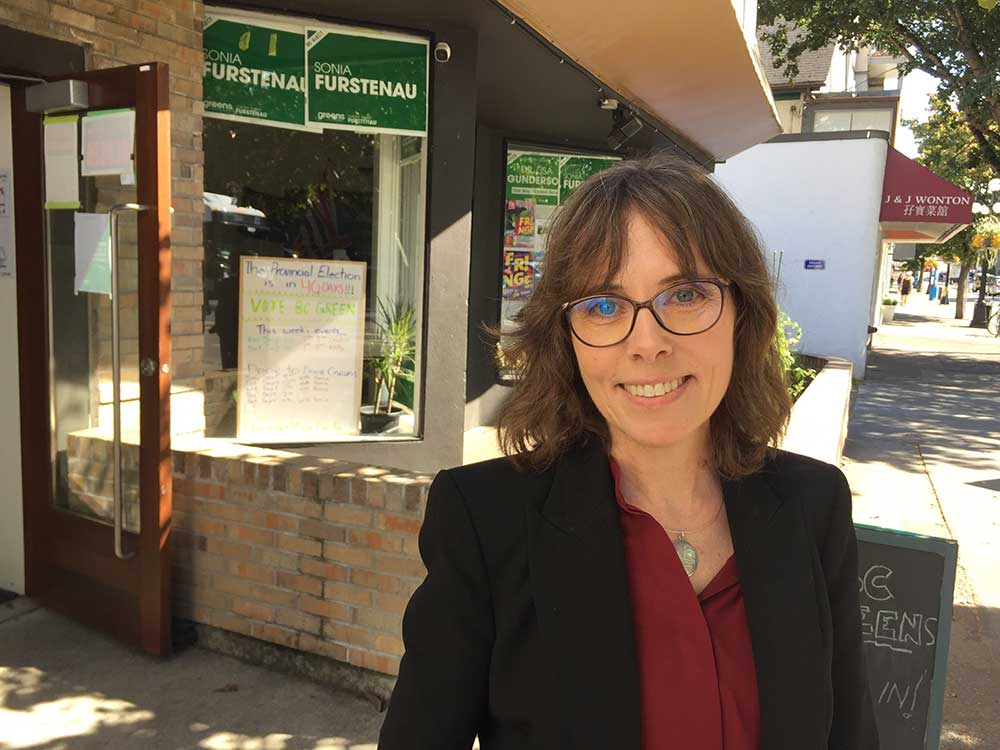
Sonia Furstenau outside her campaign office in 2024

Sonia Furstenau was elected as leader on September 14, 2020. A week after her selection as leader, the 2020 general election was called. Furstenau and Adam Olsen were returned to the Legislature. The electoral district of West Vancouver-Sea to Sky was originally called for Green candidate Jeremy Valeriote; the winning margin was small enough to trigger an automatic judicial recount. After the recount, it was determined that Liberal Jordan Sturdy had held the seat.

In January 2024, Furstenau announced that she would run in Victoria-Beacon Hill riding during the provincial general election later that year. She was defeated but remained as leader following the election. She subsequently negotiated a cooperation agreement with the NDP in exchange for agreement that some policies from the Green platform would be implemented. On January 28, 2025, Furstenau announced her intention to resign as leader. Jeremy Valeriote became interim leader.

=== Lowan (since 2025) ===
The party held a leadership election in September 2025, which was won by organizer and activist Emily Lowan. In February 2026, the party decided not to renew its confidence and supply agreement with the BC NDP government, accusing it of not implementing the terms of the agreement. In the 2026 British Columbia general election, the party won two seats and gained in vote share, with Lowan winning her seat of Saanich North and the Islands.

== Leaders ==
#	Leader	Term start	Term end
1	Adriane Carr	1983	1985
Position abolished between 1985–1992 (Note: Three speakers, instead of a single leader, were elected during these years.)
2	Stuart Parker	1993	2000
*	Tom Hetherington (interim)	2000	2000
3	Adriane Carr	2000	2006
*	Christopher Bennett (interim)	2007	2007
4	Jane Sterk	2007	2013
*	Adam Olsen (interim)	2013	2015
5	Andrew Weaver	2015	2020
*	Adam Olsen (interim)	2020	2020
6	Sonia Furstenau	2020	2025
*	Jeremy Valeriote (interim)	2025	2025
7	Emily Lowan	2025	(incumbent)

== MLAs ==
The following Green Party MLAs have represented electoral districts in British Columbia:

Name	District	Term	Citation
Andrew Weaver	Oak Bay-Gordon Head	2013–2020	
Sonia Furstenau	Cowichan Valley	2017–2024	
Adam Olsen	Saanich North and the Islands	2017–2024	
Rob Botterell	Saanich North and the Islands	2024–2026	
Jeremy Valeriote	West Vancouver-Sea to Sky	2024–present	
Emily Lowan	Saanich North and the Islands	Since 2026	

== Election results ==
Election	Leader	Candidates run	Seats won	Votes	Vote share	Seat change	Position	Legislative role	Notes
1983	Adriane Carr	4 / 57	0 / 57	3,078	0.19%	0	7th	No seats	Social Credit majority
1986	vacant	9 / 69	0 / 69	▲4,660	▲0.24%	0	▲5th	No seats	Social Credit majority
1991	vacant	42 / 75	0 / 75	▲12,650	▲0.86%	0	▲4th	No seats	NDP majority
1996	Stuart Parker	71 / 75	0 / 75	▲31,511	▲1.99%	0	▼5th	No seats	NDP majority
2001	Adriane Carr	72 / 79	0 / 79	▲197,231	▲12.39%	0	▲3rd	No seats	Liberal majority
2005	Adriane Carr	79 / 79	0 / 79	▼161,842	▼9.17%	0	3rd	No seats	Liberal majority
2009	Jane Sterk	85 / 85	0 / 85	▼134,570	▼8.21%	0	3rd	No seats	Liberal majority
2013	Jane Sterk	61 / 85	1 / 85	▲146,607	▼8.13%	▲1	3rd	No status	Liberal majority
2017	Andrew Weaver	83 / 87	3 / 87	▲332,387	▲16.84%	▲2	3rd	No status	Liberal minority
2017	Andrew Weaver	83 / 87	3 / 87	▲332,387	▲16.84%	▲2	3rd	Confidence and supply	Support for NDP minority
2020	Sonia Furstenau	73 / 87	2 / 87	▼284,326	▼15.08%	▼1	3rd	Third party	NDP majority
2024	Sonia Furstenau	69 / 93	2 / 93	▼173,382	▼8.24%	0	3rd	Confidence and supply (2024–2026)	Support for NDP majority
2024	Sonia Furstenau	69 / 93	2 / 93	▼173,382	▼8.24%	0	3rd	Third party	NDP majority
2026	Emily Lowan	73 / 93	2 / 93	▲216,808	▲11.15%	0	3rd	Third party	Conservative majority

== See also ==
- List of British Columbia general elections
- List of Green party leaders in Canada
- List of Green politicians who have held office in Canada
- List of political parties in British Columbia
- Politics of British Columbia
