= Imagine Surrey =

Municipal political party in Surrey, British Columbia

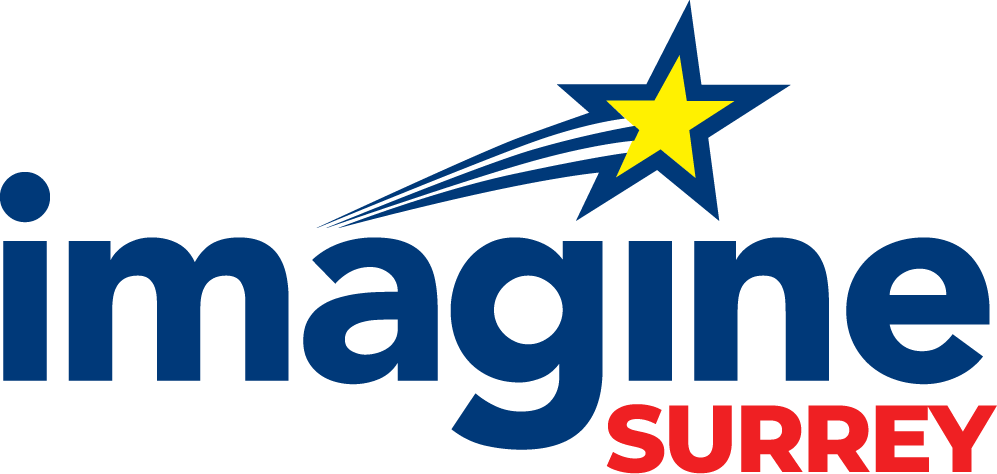
- Founder: Mike Starchuk
- Founded: December 2025
- Headquarters: Surrey, British Columbia
- Ideology: Liberalism, Social Democracy
- Political position: centre to centre-left
- Seats on the City Council: 0 / 9

Website
- Official website

Imagine Surrey is a municipal political party in Surrey, British Columbia, Canada, founded in December 2025 to contest the 2026 Surrey municipal election. The party is led by mayoral candidate Mike Starchuk, a former BC New Democratic Party MLA for Surrey-Cloverdale, former City Councillor with Surrey First, and retired Chief Fire Prevention Officer with Surrey Fire Services. The party is fielding a slate of eight candidates for City Council in 2026.

== History ==
=== Formation and 2026 election ===
Imagine Surrey was publicly launched on 8 December 2025 at an event in Surrey, where Starchuk announced his candidacy for mayor and the party's initial council candidates. The party's name was drawn from the John Lennon song "Imagine".

The party announced its candidates in stages between December 2025 and April 2026. The full slate of eight candidates for Surrey City Council was confirmed at a campaign launch in April 2026, alongside Starchuk as the mayoral candidate. The slate consists of Yousef Aldabainah, Chandan Chahal, Perminder Chohan, Narima Dela Cruz, Ashiyana Hanif, William Li, Margaret Mubanda, and Kevin Wilkie.

== 2026 Election ==
In its first election, the party's mayoral candidate Mike Starchuk finished 3rd ahead of the previously dominant Surrey First party, and behind incumbent Mayor Brenda Locke who placed second, and former Mayor Doug McCallum who won.

=== Platform and pledges ===
In March 2026, Starchuk pledged to replace Surrey's municipal motto, "The Future Lives Here," with "City of Champions" to recognize residents contributing in fields such as sport, education, public service, and humanitarian work. The party's 2026 platform is organized around five pillars: Safe Streets, Fast Commutes, Smart Investments, Lower Costs, and Strong Services. The party has also stated that "crushing extortion" is its top priority.

Imagine Surrey positioned itself as a non-incumbent alternative in the 2026 race, stating that it seeks to "challenge the status quo under the same old players and parties at Surrey City Hall." At the party's April campaign launch, Starchuk drew contrasts with the three other major candidates expected to contest the mayoralty.

Of incumbent Mayor Brenda Locke, Starchuk cited the cost of legal actions related to the Surrey Police Service transition. Of former Mayor Doug McCallum, who announced his own mayoral bid in April 2026 under the Safe Surrey Coalition banner, Starchuk cited a record of service reductions and land sales during the city's population growth. Of Surrey First Councillor Linda Annis, Starchuk criticized her past support for light-rail transit and her proposed "core review" of city services.

On October 5th, the party released a 50 page platform entitled 'Contract for a Better Surrey' which detailed 79 commitments.

The party gained the endorsements of labour unions, prominent individuals such as former MLAs Bruce Ralston and Harry Bains, and civil society organizations.

== Electoral results ==
Mayoral
Election year	Candidate	Votes	%	Position	Result
2026	Mike Starchuk	17,282	12.92	3rd	Not elected

Surrey City Council
Election year	Votes	%	Seats	+/–
2026	114,901	12.5	0 / 8	0

== See also ==
- 2026 Surrey municipal election
- Safe Surrey Coalition
- Surrey First
- Surrey Connect
