= Mike Starchuk =

Canadian politician

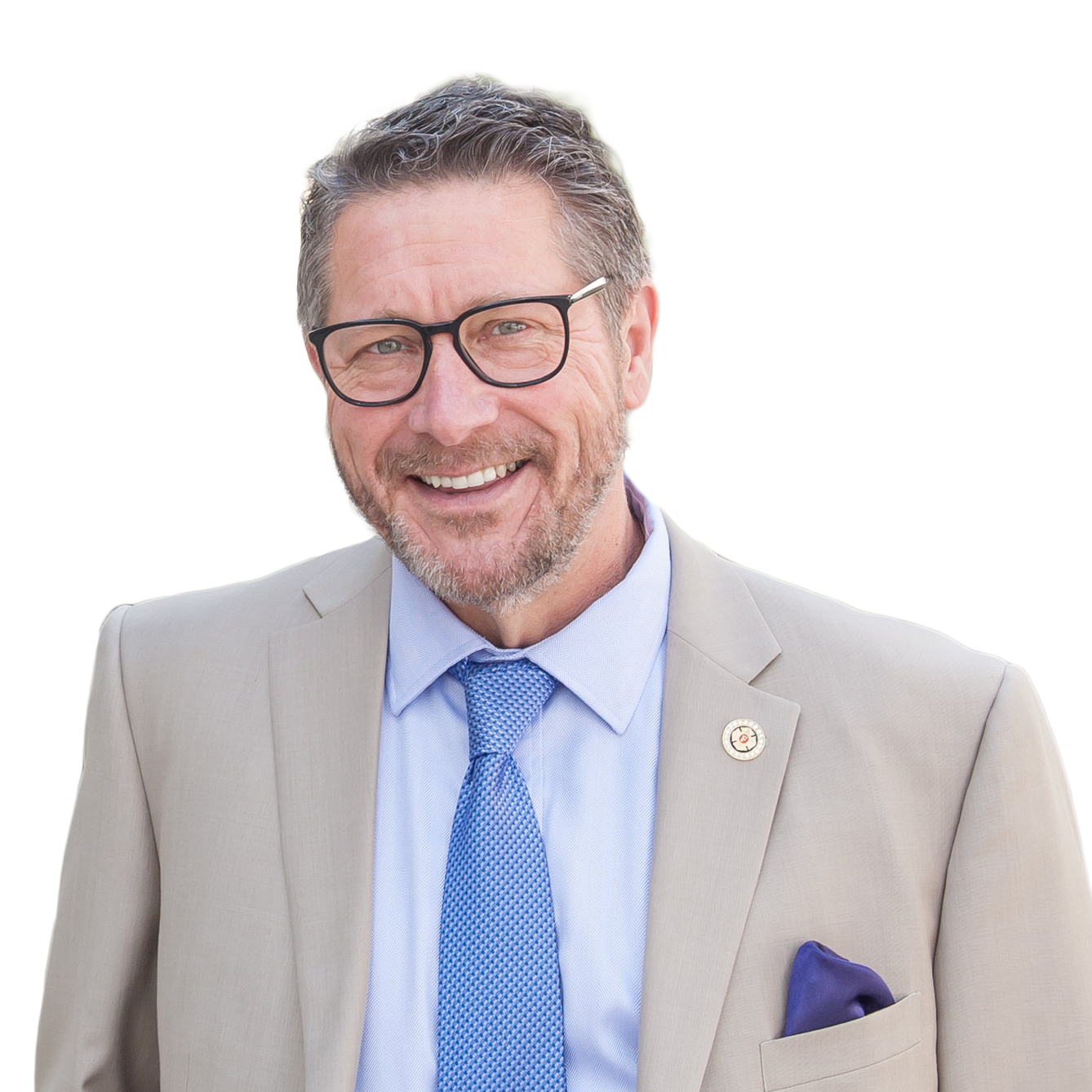

Member of the British Columbia Legislative Assembly for Surrey-Cloverdale
- In office October 24, 2020 – September 21, 2024
- Preceded by: Marvin Hunt
- Succeeded by: Elenore Sturko

Surrey City Councillor
- In office 2014–2018

Personal details
- Born: Vancouver, British Columbia
- Party: Imagine Surrey (since 2025); New Democratic; Surrey First (until 2018)
- Profession: Firefighter

Mike Starchuk is a Canadian politician who served as a member of the Legislative Assembly of British Columbia from 2020 to 2024, representing the electoral district of Surrey-Cloverdale as part of the British Columbia New Democratic Party.

== Biography ==
Born in Vancouver, Starchuk moved to Surrey in the 1960s, graduating from Princess Margaret Secondary School before attending Douglas College. He joined the Surrey Fire Service as a firefighter, ultimately becoming the city's chief fire prevention officer before retiring in 2014.

Running as a Surrey First candidate, he was elected to Surrey City Council at the 2014 municipal election. During his time as councillor, he served as chair of the city's Environmental Sustainability Advisory Committee, Agricultural and Food Security Committee, and Seniors Committee. He lost his re-election bid in 2018.

Starchuk ran in the 2020 provincial election as a New Democratic Party candidate in Surrey-Cloverdale, and defeated the incumbent Liberal candidate Marvin Hunt to become the riding's member of the Legislative Assembly. In the 42nd Parliament, he served on the Select Standing Committees on Health, Aboriginal Affairs, and Finance and Government Services. He ran for re-election in 2024, but lost to Conservative candidate Elenore Sturko.

In December 2025, Starchuk founded Imagine Surrey and became its candidate for mayor in the 2026 Surrey municipal election; he finished in third place behind Doug McCallum and Brenda Locke.

== Electoral record ==
=== Provincial elections ===
2024 British Columbia general election: Surrey-Cloverdale
Party	Candidate	Votes	%	±%	Expenditures
Conservative	Elenore Sturko	10,268	48.3%	+44.82	
New Democratic	Mike Starchuk	9,681	45.6%	–6.5	
Green	Pat McCutcheon	1,150	5.4%	–3.3	
Freedom	Judy Meilleur	153	0.7%		
Total valid votes		21,252	–		
Total rejected ballots					
Turnout					
Registered voters					
Conservative gain from New Democratic		Swing		+44.82	
Source: Elections BC

2020 British Columbia general election: Surrey-Cloverdale
Party	Candidate	Votes	%	±%	Expenditures
New Democratic	Mike Starchuk	12,992	52.10	+13.54	$56,040.91
Liberal	Marvin Hunt	8,758	35.12	−12.86	$38,284.81
Green	Rebecca Smith	2,169	8.70	−3.63	$2,758.94
Conservative	Aisha Bali	867	3.48	–	$0.00
Independent	Marcella Williams	149	0.60	–	$1,431.11
Total valid votes		24,935	100.00	–	
Total rejected ballots		206	0.82	+0.09	
Turnout		25,141	55.16	−6.65	
Registered voters		45,575			
New Democratic gain from Liberal		Swing		+13.20	
Source: Elections BC

=== Municipal elections ===
2026 Surrey municipal election: Mayor
Party	Candidate	Votes	%	±%	Elected
Safe Surrey Coalition	Doug McCallum	42,745	31.96	+4.65	✓
Surrey Connect	Brenda Locke (X)	30,886	23.09	-5.05	
Imagine Surrey	Mike Starchuk	17,261	12.90	–	
Surrey First	Linda Annis	16,572	12.39	–	
Surrey Now	Tony Van Vliet	15,074	11.27	–	
Conservative	Honveer Singh Randhawa	10,603	7.93	–	
New Surrey+	Igal Ammons II	615	0.46	–	
Total valid votes		133,798			
Safe Surrey Coalition gain from Surrey Connect		Swing		+4.85	
Note: (X) indicates the incumbent mayor

Top 8 candidates elected - Incumbents marked with "(X)"

2014 British Columbia municipal elections: Surrey City Council
Party	Council candidate	Vote	%
Surrey First	Tom Gill (X)	50,386	7.48
Surrey First	Judy Villeneuve (X)	47,029	6.98
Surrey First	Barbara Steele (X)	42,464	6.30
Surrey First	Mary Martin (X)	41,986	6.23
Surrey First	Bruce Hayne (X)	39,939	5.93
Surrey First	Dave Woods	39,258	5.83
Surrey First	Mike Starchuk	38,352	5.69
Surrey First	Vera LeFranc	35,926	5.33
Safe Surrey Coalition	Rina Gill	27,448	4.07
One Surrey	Kal Dosanjh	26,465	3.93
One Surrey	Michael Bose	26,243	3.90
Safe Surrey Coalition	Justin Thind	23,923	3.55
Safe Surrey Coalition	Beau Simpson	19,357	2.87
Safe Surrey Coalition	Laurie Guerra	18,002	2.67
One Surrey	Narima Dela Cruz	17,679	2.62
One Surrey	Brian Young	16,939	2.51
One Surrey	Darlene Bowyer	15,384	2.28
Team Surrey	Brenda Locke	15,374	2.28
One Surrey	Maz Artang	13,904	2.06
One Surrey	Merv Bayda	13,615	2.02
Independent	Saira Aujla	12,360	1.83
Independent	Jim McMurtry	9,177	1.36
Team Surrey	Stephen Gammer	9,140	1.36
Independent	Cliff Blair	8,907	1.32
Independent	Nav Dhanoya	8,869	1.32
Independent	Tanvir S. Bhupal	8,791	1.30
Independent	Gary Hoffman	8,015	1.19
Independent	Martin Rooney	7,520	1.12
Independent	Rita Elvins	7,426	1.10
Independent	Fiona Dionne	5,525	0.82
Independent	James Duncan	5,448	0.81
Independent	Shawn Francis	5,419	0.80
Independent	Rick Scorsese	3,282	0.49
Independent	Obi Canuel	2,808	0.42
Independent	Touraj Ghanbar-Zadeh	1,387	0.21
