= 2026 Surrey municipal election =

Municipal election in Surrey, British Columbia

- October 17, 2026

8 seats on Surrey City Council + 1 mayor; 6 seats on the Surrey Board of Education (School District 36 Surrey)
- Turnout: 37.35%
- Mayoral election
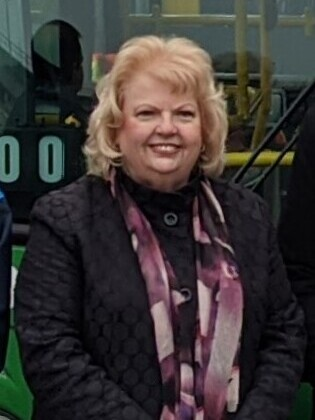

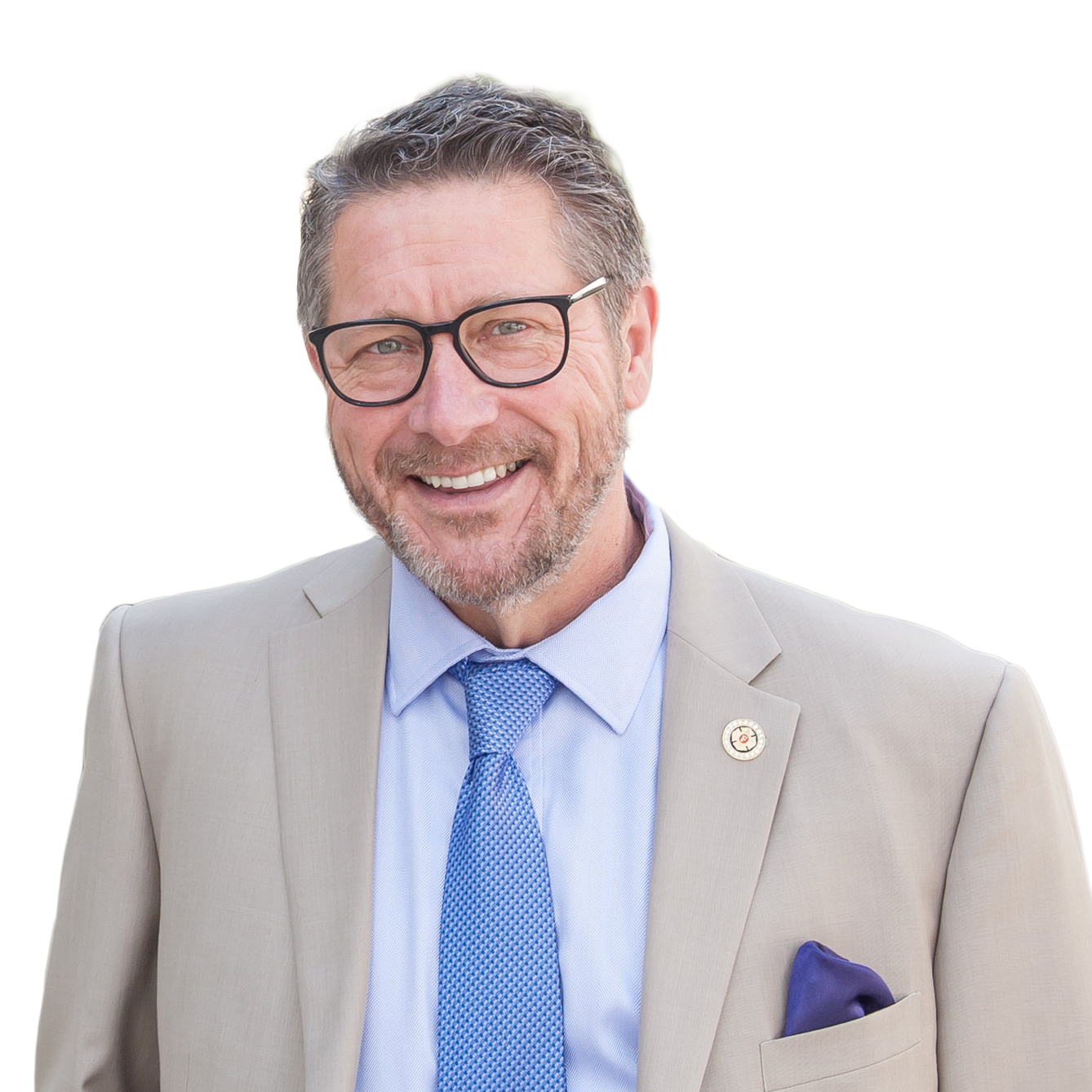
	First party	Second party	Third party
	SSC
Candidate	Doug McCallum	Brenda Locke	Mike Starchuk
Party	Safe Surrey Coalition	Surrey Connect	Imagine Surrey
Last election	27.31%, 32,338 votes	28.14%, 33,311 votes	New party
Popular vote	42,741	30,886	17,282
Percentage	31.94%	23.08%	12.92%
	Fourth party	Fifth party	Sixth party
	SF	SN	CEA
Candidate	Linda Annis	Troy Van Vliet	Honveer Singh Randhawa
Party	Surrey First	Surrey Now	Conservative Electors Association
Last election	21.05%, 24,916 votes	New party	New party
Popular vote	16,574	15,090	10,610
Percentage	12.39%	11.28%	7.93%
Mayor before election
Brenda Locke
Surrey Connect
Mayor after election
Doug McCallum
Safe Surrey Coalition
- City council election
Party	Seats	+/–
Surrey Connect	1	−3
Safe Surrey Coalition	7	+5
This lists parties that won seats. See the complete results below.
- School board election
Party	Seats	+/–
Surrey First Education	5	−1
Surrey Now	1	+1
This lists parties that won seats. See the complete results below.

The 2026 Surrey municipal election will be held on October 17, 2026, on the same day as the municipal elections held throughout British Columbia. Voters will elect a mayor along with eight city councillors and six school trustees for the Surrey Board of Education (School District 36 Surrey) through plurality-at-large voting; a seventh board of education seat, representing White Rock, is elected separately by that city.

Seven candidates are contesting the mayoralty following the close of nominations on September 11, 2026. Incumbent mayor Brenda Locke of Surrey Connect, who defeated Doug McCallum by 973 votes in the 2022 municipal election, is seeking re-election. McCallum, a former four-term mayor, returns to lead the Safe Surrey Coalition. Surrey First councillor Linda Annis is running for mayor; Surrey First's last mayoral candidate finished third in 2022. Three new parties are also contesting the election. Imagine Surrey is led by former MLA Mike Starchuk. The Conservative Electors Association, which campaigns as the Conservative Party of Surrey, is a municipal political organization whose advisory board was previously chaired by Kerry-Lynne Findlay, a former federal member of Parliament who became leader of the Conservative Party of British Columbia in May 2026; its Surrey mayoral candidate is lawyer Honveer Singh Randhawa. Surrey Now is led by Surrey builder and business owner Troy Van Vliet. Igal Ammons-II is running for mayor for the New Surrey+ Party.

Public safety and extortion-related crime, property taxes and affordability, transportation, the proposed City Centre arena, and the city's relationship with the Metro Vancouver Regional District have been the principal issues of the campaign.

== Background ==
=== 2022 election and the police transition ===
In the 2022 election, Locke defeated the incumbent McCallum by 973 votes on a platform of halting the transition from the RCMP to the Surrey Police Service. Surrey Connect won four of the eight council seats, with the Safe Surrey Coalition and Surrey First winning two each. Following the election, the provincial government ordered the policing transition to proceed despite Locke's opposition, and the Surrey Police Service became the city's police of jurisdiction in 2024. The cost and duration of the city's efforts to reverse the transition have been a recurring point of criticism of Locke from her opponents, while Locke has described the decisions of her term as difficult but necessary.

=== Issues ===
Public safety, extortion-related crime affecting the city's South Asian business community, affordability, traffic congestion, and Metro Vancouver regional governance have been identified as central issues heading into 2026. Surrey is projected to become the largest city in British Columbia within the coming term, and candidates have differed on whether municipal services and infrastructure are keeping pace with growth.

The city's plan for a City Centre Entertainment District anchored by a new arena of about 10,000 seats has divided the candidates: Surrey Connect describes it as a major city-building initiative, while Surrey First has pledged to cancel it.

In April 2026, Surrey City Council unanimously requested a provincial public inquiry into Metro Vancouver governance, citing financial stewardship concerns including a cost overrun on the North Shore Wastewater Treatment Plant from an original $700-million estimate to approximately $3.86 billion. Candidates have proposed responses ranging from board reform to withdrawal from the regional district.

=== Electoral calendar ===
Under the Local Elections Campaign Financing Act, election advertising is regulated during a pre-campaign period from July 20 to September 18, 2026, and a campaign period from September 19 to October 17, 2026. The nomination period ran from September 1 to September 11, 2026. Advance voting is scheduled for October 7, 10, 14 and 15 at ten locations, and polls on general voting day are open from 8 am to 8 pm at 52 locations.

== Campaign ==
=== Candidate announcements ===
Annis was the first to declare, on September 3, 2025, more than a year before the vote. She criticized Locke's focus on opposing the police transition and said the city was "not ready" for its growth toward one million residents. Starchuk launched Imagine Surrey on December 8, 2025, at an event in Newton, and Surrey First completed its eight-member council slate in January 2026.

The Conservative Party of Surrey named its first six council candidates in February 2026 and announced Randhawa as its mayoral candidate on March 26, with a formal launch three days later. Locke announced her re-election bid on March 5, introducing two new Surrey Connect council candidates. Imagine Surrey completed its slate at a rally in Newton on April 7, which organizers said drew 740 supporters. McCallum entered the race on April 13. Van Vliet announced his candidacy on April 19 and launched Surrey Now, with council and school board slates, on May 2 at St. John Paul II Academy in South Surrey.

The Safe Surrey Coalition introduced its council slate and a series of pledges at a South Surrey event on July 22. Locke completed the Surrey Connect slate on August 11 with former councillor Vera LeFranc and lawyer and realtor Michael Dunn; at the event she declined to match rivals' four-year property-tax freeze pledges, saying a freeze would require cuts to services or staffing.

=== Annis–Lipinski correspondence ===
In January 2026, Global News reported on text messages and emails between Annis and Surrey Police Service chief constable Norm Lipinski, obtained through a freedom of information request, in which Annis relayed complaints about impaired-driving checks that police had conducted in July 2025 outside Morgan Creek Golf Course in South Surrey, the neighbourhood where she owns a home. Lipinski replied that police had "stopped setting up there" and told senior staff the matter "requires an elevated response". Annis said she had passed along residents' concerns about several golf courses without directing the chief, that she supported roadside checks anywhere in the city, and that she would welcome an investigation. The Office of the Police Complaint Commissioner confirmed it had received multiple complaints about the matter, the provincial public safety minister asked the director of policing to assess whether follow-up was needed, and city manager Rob Costanzo described Lipinski's actions as "very serious misconduct". The police service said that after internal analysis enforcement had been moved to nearby locations on 32 Avenue and that a prevention program with alcohol-serving businesses would follow.

Lipinski left the Surrey Police Service in June 2026; the police board gave no reason for his departure, and an investigation into the correspondence had been launched. Annis called his removal "pure politics" and, in July, called on Locke and the police board not to sign a non-disclosure agreement covering his severance, which she estimated at more than $500,000.

=== Annis' dog attack and lawsuit ===
At the beginning of the campaign, it was reported that Linda Annis had not accurately disclosed information related to her dog "Ron" biting her neighour, sending him to the hospital and requiring stiches. Her dogs were unlicensed at the time of the attack, which Annis referred to as an "oversight". Ethics professor Arthur Schafer called Annis' previous statements about the incident "misleading". A lawsuit has been filed against Annis by the victim.

=== Norm Lipinski Firing ===
On June 1, 2026, Surrey Police Chief Norm Lipinski was fired. On September 28, 2026, Lipinski filed a petition in the Supreme Court of British Columbia against the Surrey Police Board seeking judicial review of his June termination, which he said had been without cause, and asking the court to set it aside as unlawful. The petition alleges that the termination, which came less than ten weeks after the province replaced five members of the board in consultation with the city, was "motivated by extraneous political considerations" unrelated to his conduct or competence, that a chief constable holds an independent office under the Police Act that cannot be terminated without cause, and that Locke had "continually undermined" him and sought his removal, citing a 2023 meeting with board administrator Mike Serr and remarks to a Surrey Police Service member in August 2024. None of the allegations has been tested in court. The board said it was reviewing the petition, would not comment publicly on a matter involving a former employee that is before the court, and was actively recruiting a new chief constable. Locke said the petition was against the board and had nothing to do with her or the city, and Surrey Connect said staffing decisions at the police service rest solely with the independent board.

Rival candidates criticized Locke over the filing. Mike Starchuk said a police chief "should never have to keep the mayor happy to keep his job".

=== Foreign-interference complaint ===
On July 28, 2026, a week into the pre-campaign period, the Safe Surrey Coalition alleged that a network of at least four Facebook pages presenting themselves as local news for Surrey, Delta and Vancouver was being operated from India, with advertising paid in Indian rupees and in some cases billed to an entity at a government research facility in Pune. Elections BC said that an initial review of the pages did not appear to show a violation of the advertising rules of the Local Elections Campaign Financing Act, and that it had not seen evidence of widespread foreign interference in British Columbia elections. McCallum filed formal complaints with Elections BC and the RCMP on July 29. Locke's campaign manager, Teddy O'Donnell, said Locke and Surrey Connect had no knowledge of the accounts and accused McCallum of seeking to "score cheap political points".

=== Close of nominations ===
When the nomination period closed on September 11, 2026, seven candidates had filed for mayor, 65 for council and 23 for school trustee.

=== Debates and forums ===
The Surrey & White Rock Board of Trade has scheduled four all-candidates forums: council candidates on September 21 and mayoral candidates on September 22 at the White Rock Community Centre, and council candidates on October 6 and mayoral candidates on October 7 at the Sheraton Vancouver Guildford Hotel.

== Mayoral election ==
=== Candidates ===
==== Igal Ammons-II (New Surrey+ Party) ====
Igal Ammons-II leads the New Surrey+ Party. In his City of Surrey candidate profile, he describes himself as a family counsellor, author, educator, inventor, innovator, and problem-solver. New Surrey+ is a first-time civic slate that also runs council candidates. Its stated goals are to build hope, unity, progress, and trust, and to shape a future for all six of Surrey’s neighbourhoods proportionally. Its candidates also highlight public safety, responsible financial management, better transportation, thoughtful development, and community spaces. The party’s most specific stated commitments are giving residents a partnership in City Hall and a pathway to homeownership.

==== Linda Annis (Surrey First) ====
Annis, first elected to council in 2018 and re-elected in 2022 with the most votes of any council candidate, is the executive director of Metro Vancouver Crime Stoppers. She has pledged to cancel the proposed City Centre arena, which the party describes as a $600-million project without a plan, budget or tenant, and to redirect spending toward neighbourhood parks, pools, rinks, fields and recreation programs. She has said she would push for a light rail system, end the city's disputes and lawsuits over the police transition, and focus council on "gangs, extortionists, and drug dealers" rather than on the provincial government or the police board. Other proposals include an advisory panel of former Surrey mayors, an economic plan centred on cutting red tape, and reforms at Metro Vancouver including a smaller board, the elimination of meeting fees for members, and a full audit of the North Shore Wastewater Treatment Plant project.

==== Brenda Locke (Surrey Connect) ====
Locke co-founded Surrey Connect in 2020 and was elected mayor in 2022 on a platform of halting the police transition. Surrey Connect is campaigning on its record in office, citing infrastructure investment including the Newton Recreation Centre and new ice sheets in Cloverdale, the establishment of the City Centre Entertainment District and the launch of the City Centre arena process, two city-supported medical clinics opened through private partnerships, and advocacy for expanded RapidBus and SkyTrain service. Locke has said a re-elected Surrey Connect council would keep property-tax increases low, citing a proposed 2026 increase of 2.6 per cent, but has declined to commit to a four-year freeze. Its candidates have pointed to commitments to hire additional public-safety personnel, upgrade the ice rinks at the South Surrey Arena, build a new pool in Cloverdale, and develop the Cloverdale Fairgrounds through a master plan.

==== Doug McCallum (Safe Surrey Coalition) ====
McCallum was mayor from 1996 to 2005 and from 2018 to 2022; the Safe Surrey Coalition won the mayoralty and seven of eight council seats in 2018 before losing to Locke by 973 votes in 2022. He has pledged to hold property-tax increases at zero per cent for four years, extend SkyTrain to Newton, and adopt a "zero tolerance" policy on criminal and extortion activity backed by an expansion of policing resources, including a dedicated helicopter for the Surrey Police Service within 90 days of taking office and a fleet of police drones. Other commitments include approving residential building permits within 60 days or waiving the permit fee, a forensic audit of city finances, an end to in-camera council meetings, new pools in Clayton Heights and City Centre and a community centre with a pool in Newton, heritage protection for Crescent Beach and Ocean Park, a two-year waiver of business licence fees for new businesses, and a "Surrey Centre Opportunity Zone" with reduced city fees. McCallum has also said that Surrey would withdraw from the Metro Vancouver Regional District under his leadership, remaining connected only for water, sewer and waste services.

==== Honveer Singh Randhawa (Conservative Electors Association) ====
Randhawa, a lawyer and founder of the Randhawa Law Centre, was the Conservative candidate in Surrey-Guildford in the 2024 British Columbia general election, losing to the NDP's Garry Begg by 22 votes; his court challenge of the result was dropped in December 2025. He has described his priorities as safer streets, lower taxes and "putting families first", and has said he would fully fund law enforcement to confront extortion. He has pledged to cut household water bills by half by funding the installation of water meters so that households can move from flat-rate to metered billing, which the campaign says would save an average of $1,427 a year. Other commitments include a "Surrey Home Protection Fund" to compensate landlords for unrecoverable Residential Tenancy Branch awards, and directing city staff to seek intervenor status in the appeal of Cowichan Tribes v. Canada, a 2025 B.C. Supreme Court decision recognizing Aboriginal title over land in Richmond, on the grounds of private property rights. Randhawa has also said he would seek to remove SOGI materials from Surrey classrooms and form a parent–citizen committee to review library materials for age-appropriateness, which the Surrey Citizen characterized as a possible ban on some library materials.

==== Mike Starchuk (Imagine Surrey) ====
Starchuk, a former Surrey firefighter who retired as the city's chief fire prevention officer, served on council from 2014 to 2018 after being elected with Surrey First and was the BC NDP MLA for Surrey-Cloverdale from 2020 to 2024. He has cited Locke's handling of the police transition as a principal reason for his candidacy. Imagine Surrey's platform is organized under five headings: safe streets, fast commutes, smart investments, lower costs and strong services. Starchuk has said extortion would be his first priority and has proposed regular public briefings on it modelled on provincial COVID-19 updates. On transportation, the party proposes converting the R6 RapidBus into a full bus rapid transit route between Newton and Scott Road Station, a new bus rapid transit route from Surrey Central to Semiahmoo via Guildford and 152 Street, three such routes by the end of a first term, and 50 kilometres (31 mi) of new sidewalks over four years beginning near schools. Other commitments include an international cricket and rugby stadium, a riverfront development, a 50 per cent cut to recreation fees for seniors with the elimination of "Super Senior" surcharges, a free swim lesson for every child aged five and under, and replacing the city's "The Future Lives Here" motto with "City of Champions".

==== Troy Van Vliet (Surrey Now) ====
Van Vliet, a builder and business owner and the principal of the development company Tavan Group, founded St. John Paul II Academy, an independent Catholic secondary school in South Surrey. Surrey Now describes its priorities as "safe streets, smart growth, strong families" and "real ownership", and Van Vliet has said he would bring a builder's approach to city hall focused on practical results and long-term planning rather than "political games".

=== Results ===
2026 Surrey municipal election: Mayor
Party	Candidate	Votes	%	±%	Elected
Safe Surrey Coalition	Doug McCallum	42,745	31.96	+4.65	✓
Surrey Connect	Brenda Locke (X)	30,886	23.09	-5.05	
Imagine Surrey	Mike Starchuk	17,261	12.90	–	
Surrey First	Linda Annis	16,572	12.39	–	
Surrey Now	Tony Van Vliet	15,074	11.27	–	
Conservative	Honveer Singh Randhawa	10,603	7.93	–	
New Surrey+	Igal Ammons II	615	0.46	–	
Total valid votes		133,798			
Safe Surrey Coalition gain from Surrey Connect		Swing		+4.85	
Note: (X) indicates the incumbent mayor

=== Opinion polling ===
Various organizations conduct opinion polls to gauge voter intention ahead of the election. The lead is the difference between the polling percentages of the first- and second-place parties.

==== Table of polls ====
Polling firm	Client	Date(s) conducted	Link	Locke (SC)	McCallum (SSC)	Annis (SF)	Starchuk (IS)	Randhawa (CEA)	Van Vliet (SN)	Others	Would not vote	Undecided	Margin of error	Sample size	Polling method	Lead
Pollara	—	Sept. 23 – Oct. 13, 2026		33%	20%	22%	25%	—	—	—	—	—	—	432	Online	8
Canada Pulse Insights	Rogers OMNI TV	Sept. 28 – Oct. 6, 2026		33%	16%	16%	12%	9%	12%	—	—	8%	±4.5%	483	Online	17
Leger	Postmedia	Sept. 23 – Sept. 26, 2026		24%	12%	7%	7%	6%	—	—	5%	34%	±2.8%	249	Online	12
		September 11, 2026	Nomination period closes; seven candidates for mayor.													
		May 2, 2026	Surrey Now launches its campaign; Troy Van Vliet launches his mayoral campaign.													
		April 13, 2026	Doug McCallum announces his re-election bid with the Safe Surrey Coalition.													
		March 26, 2026	Honveer Singh Randhawa is named Conservative Electors Association mayoral candidate for Surrey.													
		March 5, 2026	Incumbent mayor Brenda Locke announces her re-election bid with Surrey Connect.													
		December 8, 2025	Imagine Surrey is founded; Mike Starchuk launches his mayoral campaign.													
Mainstreet Research	—	Oct. 17 – Oct. 22, 2025		4%	7%	11%	— (Note: Imagine Surrey had not been formed when this poll was conducted.)	25%	—	53% (Note: Includes 4.3% for Independent, 2.5% for Surrey Forward, and 0.3% for United Surrey.)	—	—	±3.5%	803	IVR	14
		September 3, 2025	Linda Annis announces her mayoral candidacy with Surrey First.													
2022 election	—	October 15, 2022		28.14%	27.31%	21.05%	—	—	—	23.51%	—	—	—	118,908	—	0.83

Party abbreviations: SC = Surrey Connect; SSC = Safe Surrey Coalition; SF = Surrey First; IS = Imagine Surrey; CEA = Conservative Electors Association; SN = Surrey NOW

=== 2022 results ===
Results of the 2022 mayoral election are shown below. Turnout was 34.54 per cent.

Candidate	Party	Votes	%
Brenda Locke (elected)	Surrey Connect	33,311	28.14%
Doug McCallum (incumbent)	Safe Surrey Coalition	32,338	27.31%
Gordie Hogg	Surrey First	24,916	21.05%
Jinny Sims	Surrey Forward	14,895	12.58%
Sukh Dhaliwal	United Surrey	9,629	8.13%
Amrit Birring	People's Council Surrey	2,270	1.92%
John Milton Wolanski	Independent	646	0.55%
Kuldip Pelia	Independent	385	0.33%

== City council election ==
Eight seats on Surrey City Council are elected at large through plurality-at-large voting. Following the 2022 election, the council consisted of four Surrey Connect councillors (plus Mayor Locke), two Safe Surrey Coalition councillors, and two Surrey First councillors. Sixty-five candidates filed for council by the close of nominations on September 11, 2026; those running as independents or with elector organizations other than those listed below are named on the City of Surrey's candidate list.

=== Candidates by party ===
==== Conservative Electors Association ====
In Surrey, mayoral candidate Honveer Singh Randhawa leads the association's local slate of eight council candidates

- Ricky Bajwa
- Dan B. Carlos
- Mehnaz Javed
- Cordel Pullar
- Manu Sharma
- Harkirat Sidhu
- Calvin Vanderploeg
- Donna Wu

==== Imagine Surrey ====
Mayoral candidate Mike Starchuk leads a slate of eight council candidates

- Yousef Aldabainah
- Chandan Chahal
- Perminder Chohan
- Narima Dela Cruz
- Ashiyana Hanif
- William Li
- Margaret Mubanda
- Kevin Wilkie

==== Surrey First ====
Mayoral candidate Linda Annis leads the Surrey First slate of eight council candidates

- Debra Antifaev
- Mike Bose (incumbent)
- Janet Brown
- Bilal Cheema
- Jasroop Gosal
- Gagan Nahal
- Clint Stewart
- Shina Vermani

==== Surrey Connect ====
Incumbent mayor Brenda Locke leads the Surrey Connect slate of eight council candidates

- Harry Bains (incumbent)
- Michael Dunn
- Gord Hepner (incumbent)
- Pardeep Kooner (incumbent)
- Vera LeFranc
- Rob Stutt (incumbent)
- Rona Tepper
- Noemi Victorino

==== Surrey Now ====
Mayoral candidate Troy Van Vliet leads the Surrey Now slate of seven council candidates

- Gail Beszedes
- Ollivor Dickson
- Rahul Gill
- Jesse Johl
- Enrique Ponce De Leon
- Werner Spangehl
- James Yu (Note: Yu was previously announced as a Conservative Electors Association council candidate.)

==== Safe Surrey Coalition ====
Former mayor Doug McCallum leads the Safe Surrey Coalition slate of eight council candidates

- Cheney Cloke (previously candidate with Conservative Electors Association and Surrey Now)
- Doug Elford (incumbent)
- Meera Gill
- Suhana Gill
- Laurie Guerra
- Mandeep Nagra (incumbent)
- Allison Patton
- Beau Simpson

=== Results ===
Party	Council candidate	Vote	%
Surrey Connect	Harry Bains (X)	31,362	3.40
Safe Surrey Coalition	Doug Elford (X)	30,833	3.34
Safe Surrey Coalition	Meera Gill	29,883	3.34
Safe Surrey Coalition	Mandeep Singh Nagra (X)	29,692	3.22
Safe Surrey Coalition	Suhana Gill	27,820	3.02
Safe Surrey Coalition	Allison Patton	27,132	2.94
Safe Surrey Coalition	Laurie Guerra	26,554	2.88
Safe Surrey Coalition	Cheney Cloke	26,324	2.85
Surrey First	Mike Bose (X)	26,092	2.83
Safe Surrey Coalition	Beau Simpson	25,565	2.77
Surrey Connect	Gord Hepner (X)	23,821	2.58
Surrey Connect	Pardeep Kooner (X)	22,915	2.48
Surrey Connect	Rob Stutt (X)	21,822	2.37
Surrey Connect	Noemi Victorino	21,395	2.32
Surrey Connect	Michael Dunn	20,984	2.28
Surrey Connect	Vera LeFranc	20,420	2.21
Surrey First	Janet Brown	20,215	2.19
Surrey Connect	Rona Tepper	19,016	2.06
Imagine Surrey	Narima Dela Cruz	18,344	1.99
Surrey First	Bilal Cheema	17,115	1.86
Imagine Surrey	William Li	16,667	1.81
Surrey First	Gagan Nahal	16,097	1.75
Surrey First	Debra Antifaev	15,882	1.72
Surrey Now	James Yu	15,752	1.71
Conservative	Dan B. Carlos	15,719	1.70
Surrey Now	Ollivor Dickson	15,440	1.67
Surrey First	Clint Stewart	14,986	1.63
Imagine Surrey	Kevin Wilkie	14,932	1.62
Imagine Surrey	Perminder Chohan	14,354	1.56
Conservative	Donna Wu	14,350	1.56
Conservative	Ricky Bajwa	14,132	1.53
Surrey Now	Gail Beszedes	13,743	1.49
Surrey Now	Werner Spangehl	13,638	1.48
Imagine Surrey	Yousef Aldabainah-Barakat	13,298	1.44
Surrey Now	Rahul Gill	13,289	1.44
Imagine Surrey	Margaret Mubanda	13,262	1.44
Surrey Now	Enrique Ponce de Leon	13,256	1.44
Surrey Now	Jesse Johl	13,215	1.43
Imagine Surrey	Ashiyana Hanif	12,485	1.35
Surrey First	Jasroop Gosal	12,205	1.32
Conservative	Harkirat Sidhu	12,181	1.32
Conservative	Calvin Vanderploeg	12,137	1.32
Imagine Surrey	Chandan Chahal	11,559	1.25
Conservative	Manu Sharma	11,235	1.22
Surrey First	Shina Vermani	11,061	1.20
Conservative	Mehnaz Javed	10,618	1.15
Conservative	Cordel Pullar	10,010	1.09
New Surrey+	Emily Kennedy	9,152	0.99
Independent	Lisa Dawn Alexis	8,729	0.95
Independent	Isaac Daniel	4,615	0.50
Independent	Vik Uppal	4,439	0.48
Independent	Jimmy Rico	4,259	0.46
Independent	Salman Zafar	4,018	0.44
Independent	Youssef Khattab	3,805	0.41
New Surrey+	Grace Zeigler	3,584	0.39
Independent	Intikhab Ahmed	3,421	0.37
New Surrey+	Lily Tsi	3,195	0.35
New Surrey+	Christopher R. Hoffmann	3,129	0.34
Independent	Tom Said	2,897	0.31
Independent	Philip Carless	2,769	0.30
New Surrey+	Ian de Hoog	2,749	0.30
Independent	Miguel Ting	2,414	0.26
Independent	Mila Wong-Kabush	1,948	0.21
New Surrey+	Leanna Jacinta Chatwin	1,606	0.17
New Surrey+	Matthew J. Smed	1,435	0.16
New Surrey+	Messia Ditshimba	1,191	0.13

== School board election ==
Six of the seven seats on the Surrey Board of Education (School District 36 Surrey) will be contested by Surrey voters; the seventh seat, representing White Rock, is elected separately by voters in that city. Twenty-three candidates filed for trustee by the close of nominations.

=== 2022 results ===
All six Surrey seats were won by Surrey First Education candidates Terry Allen, Bob Holmes, Laurie Larsen, Garry Thind, Gary Tymoschuk, and Shawn Wilson. The White Rock seat was won by acclamation by independent trustee Laurae McNally.

=== 2026 candidates ===
==== Our Surrey ====
Our Surrey is a new slate running four candidates:

- Kyle Jones
- Vick Karan
- Dean McGee
- Anne Whitmore

==== Surrey First Education ====
All six incumbent Surrey First Education trustees are seeking re-election

- Terry Allen (incumbent)
- Bob Holmes (incumbent)
- Laurie Larsen (incumbent)
- Garry Thind (incumbent)
- Gary Tymoschuk (incumbent)
- Shawn Wilson (incumbent)

==== Surrey Now ====
Surrey Now has announced a six-candidate slate for the Surrey Board of Education

- John Banovich
- Michelle Ceniza
- Rohit D'Silva
- Vanessa Gilera
- Vincent Tighe
- Venson Wang

== Endorsements ==
=== Brenda Locke (Surrey Connect) ===
Labour organizations

- Surrey Fire Fighters Association IAFF Local 1271

=== Mike Starchuk (Imagine Surrey) ===
Former MLAs

- Harry Bains, former MLA for Surrey-Newton, former BC NDP Ministe of Labour (endorsed Mike Starchuk)
- Bruce Ralston, former MLA for Surrey-Whalley, former BC NDP Minister of Jobs, Trade and Technology, Minister of Energy, Mines and Low Carbon Innovation, and Minister of Forests (endorsed Mike Starchuk)
- Andrew Weaver, former MLA for Oak Bay–Gordon Head, former leader of the BC Green Party (endorsed Mike Starchuk and the entire Imagine Surrey slate)

Media figures

- Kevin Diakiw, former reporter with the Surrey Leader for 22 years, running as an independent candidate for Surrey-White Rock (endorsed Mike Starchuk)

Labour organizations

- New Westminster & District Labour Council, which also endorsed five Imagine Surrey council candidates
- Unifor Local 3000 (endorsed Mike Starchuk and the entire Imagine Surrey slate)

Civil society organizations

- Young British Columbians for Better Governance (endorsed the entire Imagine Surrey slate)

== See also ==
- 2022 Surrey municipal election
- Surrey City Council
- School District 36 Surrey
