= Brenda Locke =

Canadian politician

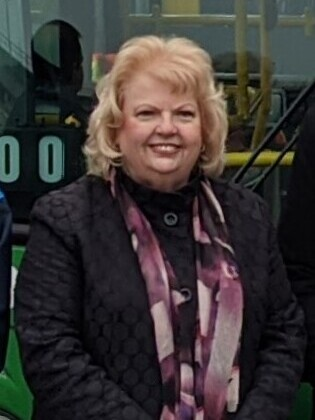
- Brenda Locke in 2024

Mayor of Surrey
- In office November 7, 2022 – November 2, 2026
- Preceded by: Doug McCallum
- Succeeded by: Doug McCallum

Surrey City Councillor
- In office November 5, 2018 – November 7, 2022

Minister of State for Mental Health and Addiction Services of British Columbia
- In office September 20, 2004 – June 16, 2005
- Premier: Gordon Campbell
- Preceded by: Susan Brice
- Succeeded by: Position abolished

Member of the Legislative Assembly for Surrey-Green Timbers
- In office May 16, 2001 – May 17, 2005
- Preceded by: Sue Hammell
- Succeeded by: Sue Hammell

Personal details
- Born: 1955 Vancouver, British Columbia, Canada
- Party: Surrey Connect (municipal); BC Liberal (provincial)
- Other political affiliations: Safe Surrey Coalition (2018–2019); TeamSurrey (2014); Liberal Party of Canada (ca. 2006–2008)
- Spouse: John (m. 1975)
- Children: 2

Brenda Joy Locke (born 1955) is a Canadian politician who served as the mayor of Surrey, British Columbia from 2022 to 2026. She was elected to the post in 2022 after defeating the incumbent Doug McCallum. She previously served on the Surrey City Council from 2018 to 2022, and represented the electoral district of Surrey-Green Timbers in the Legislative Assembly of British Columbia from 2001 to 2005 as a member of the British Columbia Liberal Party. She was Minister of State for Mental Health and Addiction Services from 2004 to 2005 in the provincial cabinet of Premier Gordon Campbell.

== Background ==
Born in Vancouver, Locke worked as the office manager for the Richmond Association for Children's Services from 1979 to 1983, then as the executive director of the BC Liquor Licensee and Retailers Association from 1985 to 2001.

Married since 1975, she and her husband John have two children together, and have been residents of Surrey since 1980.

== Political career ==
In the 2001 provincial election, Locke ran for the British Columbia Liberal Party in Surrey-Green Timbers, and defeated New Democrat incumbent Sue Hammell to become the riding's member of the Legislative Assembly. She served as chair of the Select Standing Committee on Finance and Government Services, and member of the Legislative Standing Committee on Education, the Multicultural Committee, Women's Caucus Committee and the Government Caucus Committee on Health. On September 20, 2004, she was appointed to the cabinet by Premier Gordon Campbell to serve as Minister of State for Mental Health and Addiction Services.

Locke faced Hammell again in the 2005 provincial election; this time Hammell defeated Locke to reclaim the seat. Locke subsequently ran as the federal Liberal Party candidate in Fleetwood—Port Kells in the 2006 and 2008 federal elections, but lost both times to Conservative incumbent Nina Grewal.

In the 2014 municipal election, Locke teamed up with real-estate agent Stephen Gammer under the political party, TeamSurrey, to run for city council. She came in 18th place, with 2.28% of the vote. In the 2017 provincial election, she ran for the BC Liberal party in her former seat of Surrey-Green Timbers but was defeated by Rachna Singh. While she was out of office, Locke worked as executive director for the B.C. Massage Therapist Association.

At the October 20, 2018 municipal election, Locke was elected to Surrey City Council as a part of the Safe Surrey Coalition (SSC). While she initially approved of mayor Doug McCallum's plan to replace the Surrey RCMP with a municipal police force, in the following months she became critical of McCallum's approach on the matter, culminating in her departure from the SSC on June 27, 2019 to become an independent councillor. In January 2020, along with fellow ex-SSC city councillor Jack Hundial, she founded a new political slate called Surrey Connect. She announced in July 2021 her intention to run for mayor of Surrey under the Surrey Connect banner, and proposed halting the police transition during her campaign.

On October 15, 2022, Locke defeated the incumbent McCallum to become mayor. Although city council voted to retain the services of the RCMP, the city was ordered by the provincial government in July 2023 to proceed with the police transition. That October, Locke announced in a statement the city would seek a judicial review on the provincial order. The case was dismissed by the Supreme Court of British Columbia in May 2024, and the Surrey Police Service assumed jurisdiction over the city on November 29, 2024. On October 17, 2026, Locke was defeated by Doug McCallum, who became mayor on November 2, 2026.

== Electoral record ==
B.C. General Election 2001: Surrey-Green Timbers
Party	Candidate	Votes	%	±	Expenditures
Liberal	Brenda Locke	7,539	48.95%	+15.16%	$46,658
NDP	Sue Hammell	5,592	36.31%	-13.80%	$37,237
Unity	C. Lewis Robinson	1,067	6.93%	n/a	$7,196
Marijuana	Dennis Kalsi	561	3.65%	n/a	$394
Reform	Jim Paterson	538	3.49%	-2.28%	$3,277
Communist	Harjit Singh Daudharia	103	0.67%	+0.37%	$332
Total valid votes		15,400	100.00%		
Total rejected ballots		151	0.98%		
Turnout		15,551	66.77%		

2005 British Columbia general election: Surrey-Green Timbers
Party	Candidate	Votes	%	±%
New Democratic	Sue Hammell	10,836	60.82	+24.51
Liberal	Brenda Locke	5,619	31.54	−17.41
Green	Sebastian Sajda	791	4.44	–
Marijuana	Amanda Boggan	225	1.26	−2.39
Emerged Democracy	Rob Norberg	151	0.85	–
Democratic Reform	Ravi Chand	142	0.80	–
Communist	Harjit Singh Daudharia	52	0.29	+0.38
Total		17,816	100.00	

2006 Canadian federal election: Fleetwood—Port Kells
Party	Candidate	Votes	%	±%	Expenditures
Conservative	Nina Grewal	14,577	33.47	–2.33	$72,197.70
Liberal	Brenda Locke	13,749	31.57	+2.10	$52,052.57
New Democratic	Barry Bell	10,961	25.17	–2.80	$18,396.32
Independent	Jack Cook	3,202	7.35	–	$75,818.07
Green	Duncan McDonald	1,059	2.43	–3.90	none listed
Total valid votes/expense limit		43,548	99.71	–	$76,227.74
Total rejected ballots		127	0.29	–0.26	
Turnout		43,675	59.44	+0.38	
Eligible voters		73,477			
Conservative hold		Swing		–2.22	
Source: Elections Canada

2008 Canadian federal election: Fleetwood—Port Kells
Party	Candidate	Votes	%	±%	Expenditures
Conservative	Nina Grewal	21,389	44.70	+11.22	$76,256.63
Liberal	Brenda Locke	12,502	26.13	–5.45	$64,457.86
New Democratic	Nao Fernando	10,916	22.81	–2.36	$59,346.68
Green	Brian Newbold	3,045	6.36	+3.93	$250.00
Total valid votes/expense limit		47,852	99.54	–	$88,578.77
Total rejected ballots		219	0.46	+0.16	
Turnout		48,071	55.57	–3.87	
Eligible voters		86,503			
Conservative hold		Swing		–	
Source: Elections Canada

2017 British Columbia general election: Surrey-Green Timbers
Party	Candidate	Votes	%	±%	Expenditures
New Democratic	Rachna Singh	8,945	58.29	+0.23	$58,322
Liberal	Brenda Locke	5,056	32.95	−1.57	$20,975
Green	Saira Aujla	1,112	7.25	+3.2	$7,739
No affiliation	Vikram Bajwa	163	1.06	–	$7,980
Your Political Party	Kanwaljit Singh Moti	69	0.44	–	$3,612
Total valid votes		15,345	100.00	–	
Total rejected ballots		163	1.05	−0.14	
Turnout		15,508	54.61	+2.29	
Registered voters		28,400			
Source: Elections BC

2026 Surrey municipal election: Mayor
Party	Candidate	Votes	%	±%	Elected
Safe Surrey Coalition	Doug McCallum	42,745	31.96	+4.65	✓
Surrey Connect	Brenda Locke (X)	30,886	23.09	-5.05	
Imagine Surrey	Mike Starchuk	17,261	12.90	–	
Surrey First	Linda Annis	16,572	12.39	–	
Surrey Now	Tony Van Vliet	15,074	11.27	–	
Conservative	Honveer Singh Randhawa	10,603	7.93	–	
New Surrey+	Igal Ammons II	615	0.46	–	
Total valid votes		133,798			
Safe Surrey Coalition gain from Surrey Connect		Swing		+4.85	
Note: (X) indicates the incumbent mayor
