= List of political parties in Canada =

This article lists political parties in Canada.

== Federal parties ==
In contrast with the political party systems of many nations, Canadian parties at the federal level are often only loosely connected with parties at the provincial level, despite having similar names. One exception is the New Democratic Party. The NDP is organizationally integrated, with most of its provincial counterparts including a shared membership excluding Quebec, which has no provincial counterpart.

== Provincial and territorial parties ==
=== British Columbia ===
Prior to 1903, there was no strong party discipline in the province, and governments rarely lasted more than two years as independent-minded members changed allegiances. MLAs were elected under a myriad of party labels many as Independents, and no one party held strong majorities. The first party government, in 1903, was Conservative. And disciplined party caucuses have been the backbone of BC provincial politics ever since. A list of political parties currently registered with Elections BC can be found at the Elections BC website.

=== Northwest Territories ===
From approximately 1897 to 1905, political parties were active; however, legislative government was eliminated when the provinces of Alberta and Saskatchewan were created out of the heavily populated area of Northwest Territories (NWT). Elected legislative government was re-established in 1951. Like Nunavut, NWT elects independent candidates and operates by consensus. Some candidates in recent years have asserted that they were running on behalf of a party, but territorial law does not recognize parties.

==== Historical parties 1897–1905 ====
- Northwest Territories Liberal Party
- Northwest Territories Liberal-Conservative Party

=== Nunavut ===
The territory, established in 1999, has a legislature that runs on a consensus government model. The members of the unicameral Legislative Assembly of Nunavut are elected individually; there are no parties and the legislature is consensus-based.

=== Saskatchewan ===
Saskatchewan elections have historically included candidates running as Independents, sometimes in coalitions or with affiliations to existing parties.

== Municipal parties ==
The majority of municipal politics in Canada are non-partisan, but the governments of Alberta, British Columbia and Quebec allow for municipal political parties. As such, cities including Calgary, Edmonton, Montreal, and Vancouver operate on a party system.

=== Burnaby ===
- Burnaby Citizens Association – 4
- Burnaby Green Party – 1

There are four independents.

=== Montreal ===
Montreal is one of the rare examples of a city with municipal political parties in Canada (they also exist in Vancouver). Political parties were legalized in Quebec by the PQ government in power in 1978. However, they existed long before official recognition by the provincial government.

=== Surrey ===
- Safe Surrey Coalition – 5
- Surrey First – 4

=== Vancouver ===
Municipal politics in Vancouver were historically dominated by the centre-right Non-Partisan Association, a "free enterprise coalition" originally established to oppose the influence of the democratic socialist Co-operative Commonwealth Federation. Following the 2008 municipal election, the social democratic Vision Vancouver became the dominant party in city politics for 10 years until its defeat in the 2018 election.

== See also ==
- Government of Canada
