= Marvin Hunt =

Canadian politician (born 1951)

Marvin Hunt MLA
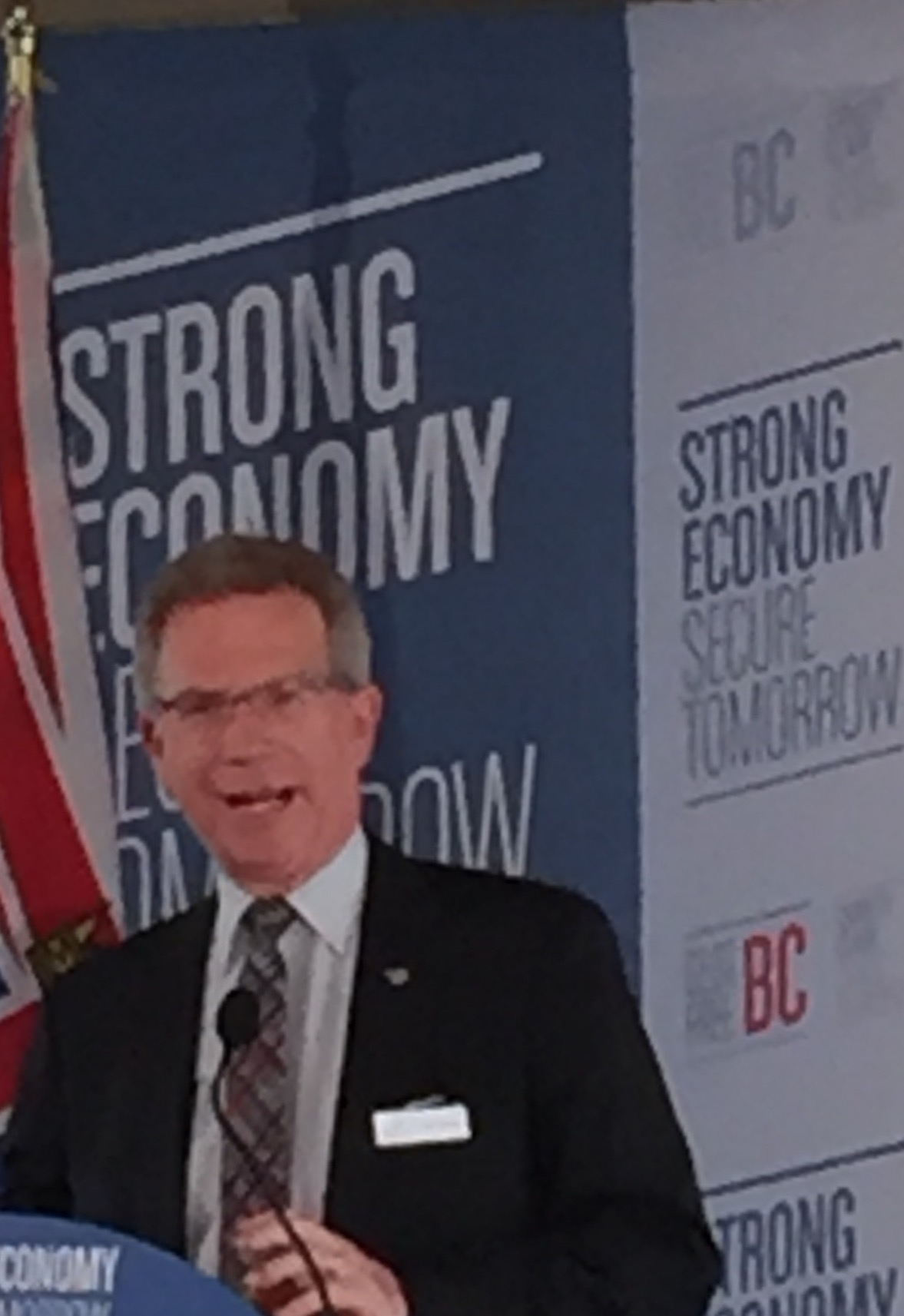
- British Columbia MLA Marvin Hunt speaking at a BC Liberal podium in 2016

Member of the British Columbia Legislative Assembly for Surrey-Cloverdale
- In office May 9, 2017 – September 21, 2020
- Preceded by: Stephanie Cadieux
- Succeeded by: Mike Starchuk

Member of the British Columbia Legislative Assembly for Surrey-Panorama
- In office May 14, 2013 – May 9, 2017
- Preceded by: Stephanie Cadieux
- Succeeded by: Jinny Sims

Surrey City Councillor
- In office 1988–2013

Personal details
- Born: 1951 or 1952 (age 74–75)
- Party: Liberal
- Other political affiliations: Surrey First
- Spouse: Ruth
- Children: 6 Angelina, David, Mark, Alicia, Josh 1 other

Marvin Hunt (born September 6, 1951) is a Canadian politician, who was elected to the Legislative Assembly of British Columbia in the 2013 provincial election for the Surrey-Panorama riding. He was re-elected in the district of Surrey-Cloverdale in the 2017 provincial election as a member of the British Columbia Liberal Party. He was defeated in the 2020 provincial election. He was also defeated as a Social Credit Party candidate in the 1986 provincial election in the riding of Surrey-Guildford-Whalley. In government, he served as the Parliamentary Secretary to the Minister of Community, Sport and Cultural Development. He also served as the Official Opposition critic for Social Development and Poverty Reduction.

Prior to his election to the legislature, Hunt was a longtime member of Surrey City Council. He was first elected as a city councillor in 1988. In 2011, Hunt joined Surrey First, headed by mayor Dianne Watts.

== Electoral record ==
2020 British Columbia general election: Surrey-Cloverdale
Party	Candidate	Votes	%	±%	Expenditures
New Democratic	Mike Starchuk	12,992	52.10	+13.54	$56,040.91
Liberal	Marvin Hunt	8,758	35.12	−12.86	$38,284.81
Green	Rebecca Smith	2,169	8.70	−3.63	$2,758.94
Conservative	Aisha Bali	867	3.48	–	$0.00
Independent	Marcella Williams	149	0.60	–	$1,431.11
Total valid votes		24,935	100.00	–	
Total rejected ballots		206	0.82	+0.09	
Turnout		25,141	55.16	−6.65	
Registered voters		45,575			
New Democratic gain from Liberal		Swing		+13.20	
Source: Elections BC

2017 British Columbia general election: Surrey-Cloverdale
Party	Candidate	Votes	%	±%	Expenditures
Liberal	Marvin Hunt	11,948	47.67	−11.86	$38,784
New Democratic	Rebecca Smith	9,738	38.86	+9.91	$6,028
Green	Aleksandra Muniak	3,100	12.37	–	$1,141
Libertarian	Peter Poelstra	276	1.10	–	$0
Total valid votes		25,062	100.00	–	
Total rejected ballots		184	0.73	+0.07	
Turnout		25,246	61.84	+4.05	
Registered voters		40,828			
Source: Elections BC

2013 British Columbia general election: Surrey-Panorama
Party	Candidate	Votes	%	±%	Expenditures
Liberal	Marvin Hunt	14,139	54.29	+0.03	$100,799
New Democratic	Amrik Mahil	9,308	35.74	−4.08	$72,318
Green	Sara Sharma	1,478	5.68	−0.24	$4,550
Conservative	Kevin Rakhra	1,037	3.98	–	$20,744
No Affiliation	Ali Zaidi	81	0.31	–	$1,056
Total valid votes		26,043	100.00		
Total rejected ballots		171	0.65		
Turnout		26,214	57.72		
Eligible voters		45,415			
Source: Elections BC
