= 2014 British Columbia municipal elections =

Canadian municipal elections

- 15 November 2014

Municipal elections were held in the Canadian province of British Columbia on November 15, 2014. Races were held in all municipalities and regional district electoral areas.

Incumbents marked with "(X)".

Selected mayoral races were as follows:

== Abbotsford ==
=== Mayoral election ===
Mayoral candidate	Vote	%
Henry Braun	16,171	50.91
Bruce Banman (X)	15,594	49.09

=== Abbotsford City Council election ===
Top 8 candidates elected

Council candidate	Vote	%
Patricia Ross (X)	14,852	7.97
Les Barkman (X)	11,955	6.42
Moe Gill (X)	11,459	6.15
Ross Siemens	11,255	6.04
Brenda Falk	10,649	5.72
Dave Loewen (X)	10,419	5.59
Kelly Chahal	9,698	5.21
Sandy Blue	9,614	5.16
Raji Buttar	8,787	4.72
Bill MacGregor (X)	8,787	4.72
Paul Redekopp	8,597	4.62
Vince Dimanno	6,302	3.38
Daljit Singh Sidhu	6,156	3.31
Doug Rempel	5,681	3.05
Tina Stewart	5,530	2.97
Lyle Caldwell	5,468	2.94
Rick Barkwell	5,364	2.88
Karen Young	4,862	2.61
Dan Bue	4,807	2.58
Gerda Peachey	3,291	1.77
Nathan Loewen	2,833	1.52
James W. Breckenridge	2,830	1.52
Ken Wuschke	2,311	1.24
Hank Roos	2,272	1.22
Marlisa Power	2,256	1.21
David Sahlstrom	2,254	1.21
Ward Draper	2,232	1.20
Aird Flavelle	2,000	1.07
Tim Felger	1,929	1.04
Raymond Kobes	1,785	0.96

== Burnaby ==
=== Mayoral election ===
Party	Mayoral candidate	Vote	%
Burnaby Citizens Association	Derek Corrigan (X)	28,113	68.85
Burnaby First Coalition	Daren Hancott	8,848	21.67
Independent	Helen Hee Soon Chang	1,845	4.52
Independent	Allen Gordon Hutton	974	2.39
Independent	Raj Gupta	680	1.67
Independent	Sylvia Gung	372	0.91

=== Burnaby City Council election ===
Top 8 candidates elected

Party	Council candidate	Vote	%
Burnaby Citizens Association	Pietro Calendino (X)	23,373	8.54
Burnaby Citizens Association	Dan Johnston (X)	23,267	8.50
Burnaby Citizens Association	Anne Kang (X)	22,164	8.10
Burnaby Citizens Association	Colleen Jordan (X)	22,158	8.09
Burnaby Citizens Association	Paul McDonell (X)	21,303	7.78
Burnaby Citizens Association	Sav Dhaliwal (X)	21,082	7.70
Burnaby Citizens Association	Nick Volkow (X)	19,700	7.20
Burnaby Citizens Association	James Wang	19,490	7.12
Burnaby First Coalition	Helen E. Ward	14,680	5.36
Burnaby First Coalition	Linda Hancott	13,983	5.11
Burnaby First Coalition	Jason Chan	12,959	4.73
Burnaby First Coalition	Matthew V. Hartney	12,130	4.43
Burnaby First Coalition	Ray Joseph Power	11,531	4.21
Burnaby First Coalition	Nick Kvenich	10,724	3.92
Burnaby First Coalition	Charter Lau	10,104	3.69
Burnaby First Coalition	Shakila Jeyachandran	8,029	2.93
Independent	Tom Tao	3,959	1.45
Independent	Jeff Kuah	3,107	1.14

== Campbell River ==
=== Mayoral election ===
Mayoral candidate	Vote	%
Andy Adams	4,370	47.41
Walter Jakeway (X)	4,249	46.10
Steve Wood	598	6.49

== Chilliwack ==
=== Mayoral election ===
Mayoral candidate	Vote	%
Sharon Gaetz (X)	10,183	72.84
Cameron Hull	2,731	19.54
Raymond Cauchi	1,066	7.63

=== Chilliwack City Council election ===
Top 6 candidates elected

Council candidate	Vote	%
Samuel Waddington	8,680	12.46
Jason Lum (X)	7,842	11.26
Ken Popove (X)	7,584	10.84
Chuck Stam (X)	7,132	10.24
Sue Attrill (X)	6,027	8.65
Chris Kloot	4,916	7.06
Patti MacAhonic	3,783	5.43
Stewart McLean (X)	3,631	5.21
Kim Harder	3,620	5.20
Gerry Goosen	3,143	4.51
Dick Harrington	3,030	4.35
Brenda Currie	2,621	3.76
Michael Kha	2,557	3.67
Phil Bruce	2,453	3.52
Brigida Crosbie	1,133	1.63
Phillip Maxwell	912	1.31
Richard Williams	619	0.89

== Coquitlam ==
=== Mayoral election ===
Mayoral candidate	Vote	%
Richard Stewart (X)	15,002	69.56
Lou Sekora	5,705	26.45
Mark Mahovlich	859	3.98

=== Coquitlam City Council election ===
Top 8 candidates elected

Party	Council candidate	Vote	%
Independent	Craig Hodge (X)	13,495	10.30
Independent	Terry O'Neill (X)	11,712	8.94
Independent	Brent Asmundson (X)	11,036	8.42
Independent	Dennis Marsden	10,372	7.91
Independent	Teri Towner	10,223	7.80
Coquitlam Citizens Association	Chris Wilson (X)	10,134	7.73
Independent	Mae Reid (X)	9,659	7.37
Coquitlam Citizens Association	Bonita Zarrillo (X)	7,960	6.07
Independent	Justin Kim	7,698	5.87
Coquitlam Citizens Association	Neal Nicholson (X)	7,284	5.56
Independent	Ben Craig	6,977	5.32
Independent	Andy Shen	6,066	4.63
Coquitlam Citizens Association	Jack Trumley	5,759	4.39
Independent	Massimo Mandarino	5,342	4.08
Coquitlam Citizens Association	Shobha Nair	5,281	4.03
Independent	Moe Kopahi	2,053	1.57

== Delta ==
=== Mayoral election ===
Party	Mayoral candidate	Vote	%
Delta Independent Voters Association	Lois Jackson (X)	Acclaimed	

=== Delta District Council election ===
Top 6 candidates elected

Party	Council candidate	Vote	%
Independent	Sylvia K. Bishop (X)	13,579	12.50
Independents Working For You	Jeannie L. Kanakos (X)	12,028	11.08
Delta Independent Voters Association	Ian L. Paton (X)	11,803	10.87
Independents Working For You	Bruce McDonald (X)	11,761	10.83
Independent	Heather C. King	11,339	10.44
Delta Independent Voters Association	Robert P. Campbell (X)	9,673	8.91
Delta Independent Voters Association	Rod B. Binder	8,781	8.09
Delta Connect Electors Association	Nicholas L. Wong	6,355	5.85
Delta Connect Electors Association	Jennifer A. Thoss	6,256	5.76
Delta Connect Electors Association	Lori A. Mayhew	5,169	4.76
Delta Connect Electors Association	Johann G. Ackermann	5,132	4.73
Independent	Peter S. Mattoo	4,894	4.59
Independent	Ron R. Calliou	1,732	1.59

== Gibsons ==
=== Mayoral election ===
The results for mayor of Gibsons were as follows:

Mayoral candidate	Votes	%
Wayne Rowe	1,419	63.09
Suzanne Senger	807	35.88

=== Gibsons Town Council election ===
The results for Gibsons Town Council were as follows:

Top 4 candidates elected

Council candidate	Vote	%
Silas White	1,529	67.99
Jeremy Valeriote	1,325	58.92
Charlene SanJenko (X)	1,244	55.31
Stafford Lumley	1,117	49.67
LeeAnn Johnson (X)	925	41.13
Dan Bouman (X)	849	37.75
Barry Janyk	832	36.99
Katie Janyk	698	31.04
Turnout	2,249	62.47

== Juan de Fuca Electoral Area ==
The results in Capital Regional District Electoral Area H (Juan de Fuca) were as follows:

=== Director election ===
Director candidate	Vote	%
Mike Hicks (X)	Acclaimed	

== Kamloops ==
=== Mayoral election ===
Mayoral candidate	Vote	%
Peter Gordon Milobar (X)	17,006	78.11
Pierre Luigi Filisetti	2,941	13.51
Benjamin John James	1,040	4.78
Dallas James Paisley	786	3.61

=== Kamloops City Council election ===
Top 8 candidates elected

Council candidate	Vote	%
Ken Lorne Christian (X)	12,473	8.11
Arjun Harjit Singh (X)	10,939	7.12
Dieter Wolfgang Duty	10,399	6.76
Donovan Grube Cavers (X)	8,957	5.83
Denis Jerome Walsh	8,549	5.56
Marg Louise Spina (X)	8,380	5.45
Tina Lange (X)	8,374	5.45
Patricia Anne Wallace (X)	7,483	4.87
Andy James Philpot	7,188	4.68
Nelly Mary Dever (X)	6,685	4.35
Mike Scott O'Reilly	6,350	4.13
Bob Donald Dieno	6,305	4.10
Peter George Sharp	6,240	4.06
Annette Rose Glover	5,184	3.37
Jenny Marie Green	4,658	3.03
Nancy Ruth Bepple	4,601	2.99
Brad James Harrison	4,145	2.70
Bernadette Stella Siracky	3,785	2.46
Daphane Anne Nelson	3,606	2.35
Cheryl Marie Phippen	3,452	2.25
Peter Paul Kerek	2,879	1.87
Dustin W. McIntyre	2,867	1.86
Tanja Marina Hasler	2,854	1.86
Andrew Jeremy Miller	2,235	1.45
Glen Thompson	1,772	1.15
Glenn Martin Hilke	1,598	1.04
Alexandra Elizabeth Proctor	1,290	0.84
Reo Roe Rocheleau	484	0.31

==== Mayoral and city council by-elections ====
Held on September 30, 2017 to replace mayor Milobar who was elected to the British Columbia legislature. Council by-elections were held to replace Ken Christian who was running for mayor and Marg Spina, who is battling breast cancer.

Mayoral candidate	Vote	%
Ken Christian	9,274	63.91
Bill McQuarrie	2,661	18.34
Stu Holland	773	5.33
Mike McKenzie	518	3.57
Glenn Hilke	480	3.31

Council candidate 2 to be elected	Vote	%
Kathy Sinclair	3,421	12.29
Ray Dhaliwal	3,292	11.83
Kevin Krueger	3,042	10.93
Gerald Kenyon Watson	2,424	8.71
Bill Sarai	2,182	7.84
Leslie Lax	2,112	7.59
Stephen Karpuk	1,678	6.03
Nancy Bepple	1,481	5.32
Caroline King	1,419	5.10
Sadie Hunter	1,333	4.79
Jeanne Marr	1,092	3.92
Dennis Giesbrecht	1,039	3.73
Jim Johal	825	2.96
Brad Serl	655	2.35
Tracy Schmidt	381	1.37
Jennifer Dawn Adams	375	1.35
Jon Eadie	258	0.93
Nicholas Adams	244	0.88
Jim Michals	241	0.87
Jesse Bochek	202	0.73
Ashlee Hudie	130	0.47

== Kelowna ==
=== Mayoral election ===
Mayoral candidate	Vote	%
Colin Basran	16,755	56.89
Sharon Shepherd	10,358	35.17
Mark Thompson	1,120	3.80
Chuck Hardy	544	1.85
Kelly Row	442	1.50
Glendon Smedley	83	0.28
Sam Condy	77	0.26
James Murphy	75	0.25

=== Kelowna City Council election ===
Top 8 candidates elected

Party	Council candidate	Vote	%
Independent	Luke Stack (X)	16,524	9.20
Independent	Gail Given (X)	15,559	8.66
Independent	Maxime DeHart (X)	15,522	8.64
Independent	Mohini Singh (X)	15,415	8.58
Independent	Brad Sieben	12,587	7.01
Independent	Tracy Gray	11,515	6.41
Independent	Ryan Donn	9,565	5.32
Independent	Charles Hodge	9,444	5.26
Independent	Beryl Itani	8,119	4.52
Independent	Laura Thurnheer	7,71	4.33
Independent	Alan Monk	6,185	3.44
Independent	David Mossman	5,262	2.93
TaxPayersFirst	Graeme James	4,835	2.69
TaxPayersFirst	Michael Gorman	4,391	2.44
Propser Kelowna	Mike McLoughlin	4,327	2.41
Propser Kelowna	Sean Upshaw	3,909	2.18
TaxPayersFirst	Carol Gran	3,803	2.12
Independent	Bobby Kennedy	3,107	1.73
Independent	Mo Rajabally	3,024	1.68
TaxPayersFirst	Dale Olson	2,491	1.39
Independent	Dayleen Van Ryswyk	2,294	1.28
TaxPayersFirst	Billie Aaltonen	2,191	1.22
Independent	Leslie Lendall	2,071	1.15
Independent	Rawle James	1,739	0.97
Independent	Connor P.J. O'Reilly	1,493	0.83
Independent	Ken Chung	1,474	0.82
Independent	Gwen Miles	1,272	0.71
Independent	Ken Finney	1,263	0.70
Independent	Cal Condy	989	0.55
Independent	Krista Jessacher	773	0.43
Independent	Red Somer	751	0.42

== Langford ==
=== Mayoral election ===
Mayoral candidate	Vote	%
Stewart Young (X)	3,727	87.02
David Shebib	556	12.98

== Langley Township ==
=== Mayoral election ===
Mayoral candidate	Vote	%
Jack Froese (X)	13,186	59.84
Rick W. Green	7,595	34.47
Serena Ju Oh	1,255	5.70

=== Langley District Council election ===
Top 8 candidates elected

Party	Council candidate	Vote	%
Independent	David H. Davis (X)	12,527	8.55
Independent	Kim Anne Richter (X)	11,415	7.79
Independent	Charlie W. Fox (X)	9,116	6.22
Independent	Petrina Kathryn Arnason	8,930	6.09
Independent	Michelle Leigh Sparrow (X)	8,598	5.87
Independent	Bob Long (X)	7,615	5.20
Independent	Blair Garnet Whitmarsh	7,550	5.15
Independent	Angie Dawn Quaale	7,526	5.13
Independent	Steve J. Ferguson (X)	7,377	5.03
Independent	Bev Jean Dornan (X)	7,310	4.99
Live Langley	Clint Lee	7,300	4.98
Independent	Dave Michael Stark	7,181	4.90
Live Langley	Kerri Ann Ross	7,063	4.82
Independent	Mel S. Kositsky	6,012	4.10
Independent	Grant Ward (X)	5,899	4.02
Independent	Jackie Teresa Mandzak	5,889	4.02
Independent	Kevin William Mitchell	5,537	3.78
Independent	Solon Tamas Bucholtz	4,695	3.20
Independent	Scott A. Nichols	3,765	2.57
Independent	Patricia Lynn Lessard	2,317	1.58
Independent	Karl William Buchanan	1,508	1.03
Independent	Zofja Anna Ettenberg	1,438	0.98

== Maple Ridge ==
=== Mayor ===
Mayoral candidate	Vote	%
Nicole R. Read	5,637	33.82
Mike J. Morden	4,825	28.95
Ernie Samuel Daykin (X)	3,958	23.75
Graham M. Mowatt	1,883	11.30
Gary Cleave	363	2.18

=== Maple Ridge District Council election ===
Top 6 candidates elected

Council candidate	Vote	%
Corisa N. Bell (X)	7,941	9.82
Bob Masse (X)	7,240	8.95
Tyler J. Shymkiw	6,133	7.58
Kiersten Liv Duncan	4,950	6.12
Gordy W. Robson	4,470	5.53
Craig R. Speirs	4,456	5.51
Sara Dawn Beckett	3,826	4.73
Chelsa A. Meadus	3,712	4.59
Don F. Mitchell	3,455	4.27
Al G. Hogarth (X)	3,350	4.14
Kristina K. Brown	3,242	4.01
J. Craig Ruthven	2,886	3.57
Faye Y. Isaac	2,572	3.18
Morgan V. Jensen	2,493	3.08
Dean A. Barbour	2,435	3.01
Todd M. Oliver	2,400	2.97
Ken E. Holland	2,396	2.96
Grover Telford	2,392	2.96
Craig R. Rudd	2,354	2.91
Grant Sanderson	1,691	2.09
Buddy Leonard Rogers	1,565	1.94
Alex K. Pope	1,447	1.79
Bruce McWilliam	1,106	1.37
Mike J. Norden	1,025	1.27
Brian Savage	898	1.11
Douglas R. Blamey	441	0.55

== Mission ==
=== Mayoral election ===
Party	Mayoral candidate	Vote	%
Independent	Randy Hawes	3,068	37.68
Independent	Tony J. Luck	2,236	27.46
Citizens for Responsible Municipal Government	Ted Adlem (X)	1,840	22.60
Independent	Wendy Bales	759	9.32
Independent	Kevin Francis	239	2.94

=== Mission District Council election ===
Top 6 candidates elected

Council candidate	Vote	%
Pam Alexis	4,267	10.81
Rhett Nicholson	4,231	10.72
Carolyn Hamilton	4,164	10.55
Danny Plecas	3,463	8.77
Jenny Stevens (X)	2,587	6.55
Jim Hinds	2,430	6.16
Terry Gidda	1,834	4.65
Shazad Shah	1,827	4.63
Jeff Jewell (X)	1,769	4.48
Ronn Harris	1,572	3.98
Bobby Brar	1,507	3.82
Michael Nenn	1,488	3.77
Terry Stobbart	1,467	3.72
Larry Nundal (X)	1,394	3.53
Attila Davalovsky	1,349	3.42
Don Forsythe	1,343	3.40
Dave Hensman (X)	1,259	3.19
Rich Vigurs	942	2.39
Barry Jeske	583	1.48

== Nanaimo ==
=== Mayoral election ===
Mayoral candidate	Vote	%
Bill McKay	6,400	29.76
Bill Holdom	4,265	19.83
Roger McKinnon	3,381	15.72
John Ruttan (X)	3,212	14.94
Gary Korpan	1,878	8.73
Jim Routledge	929	4.32
Brunie Brunie	696	3.24
Al Charles Thompson	493	2.29
Alisha J. Neumann-Ladret	234	1.09
Kendal Justus Csak	16	0.07

=== Nanaimo City Council election ===
Top 8 candidates elected

Council candidate	Vote	%
Bill Bestwick (X)	10,218	7.38
Bill Milton Yoachim	8,794	6.35
Wendy Lynne Pratt	8,307	6.00
Jim A. Kipp (X)	7,142	5.16
Jerry Hong	6,996	5.05
Ian W. Thorpe	6,745	4.87
Gordon William Fuller	6,703	4.84
Diane Brennan (X)	6,547	4.73
Fred Pattje (X)	6,447	4.65
Karen E. Hovestad	6,405	4.62
Ian Thompson	5,696	4.11
Jim James Taylor	5,658	4.08
Scott Robert Henderson	5,395	3.89
Kevin Arthur Cantelon	5,357	3.87
Paul Roland Gogo	5,171	3.73
Ted Greves (X)	4,879	3.52
Gail Adrienne	4,602	3.32
Brian E. Anderson	4,372	3.16
Leon J. Cake	4,294	3.10
Jack Arnold	3,598	2.60
Geraldine Manson	3,558	2.57
Jim Edward Goldsack	2,950	2.13
Tali J. Campbell	2,696	1.95
Stephen Cochrane	2,440	1.76
Fred Brooks	1,789	1.29
Mike G. Horn	1,780	1.28

==== City council by-election ====
Held on July 8, 2017 to replace councillor Wendy Pratt.

Council candidate	Vote	%
Sheryl Dawn Armstrong	3,611	48.86
Sacia Burton	858	11.61
Kevin Cantelon	643	8.70
Leon Cake	513	6.94
Jim Mercier	443	5.99
Brunie Brunie	378	5.12
Noah Routley	296	4.01
Kevin Bruce Storrie	239	3.23
Alexis Taylor Middleton	141	1.91
Al Thompson	82	1.11
Kelly Whiteside	75	1.01
Fred Statham	63	0.85
Neil Saunders	48	0.65

== New Westminster ==
=== Mayoral election ===
Mayoral candidate	Vote	%
Jonathan X. Cote	7,661	52.94
Wayne Wright (X)	5,149	35.58
James Crosty	1,345	9.30
Vladimir Krasnogor	315	2.18

=== New Westminster City Council election ===
Top 6 candidates elected

Council candidate	Vote	%
Chuck Puchmayr (X)	6,262	8.97
Lorrie Williams (X)	6,087	8.72
Jaimie McEvoy (X)	5,835	8.36
Bill Harper (X)	5,634	8.07
Patrick Johnstone	5,582	8.00
Mary Trentadue	5,517	7.90
Catherine Cartwright	5,165	7.40
Tej Kainth	5,111	7.32
Calvin Donnelly	4,394	6.29
David Brett	3,383	4.85
Scott McIntosh	2,579	3.69
John Ashdown	1,895	2.71
Tracey Block	1,847	2.65
Gavin Palmer	1,773	2.54
Mike Folka	1,637	2.35
Marge Ashdown	1,636	2.34
Harm Woldring	1,610	2.31
Jim Bell	1,562	2.24
Raj Gupta	1,235	1.77
Gerry Liu	791	1.13
Matt Kadioglu	269	0.39

== North Cowichan ==
Mayoral candidate	Vote	%
Jon Lefebure (X)	3,234	42.20
John Koury	3,018	39.38
Damir Wallener	1,411	18.41

== North Vancouver City ==
Party	Mayoral candidate	Vote	%
Independent	Darrell Mussatto (X)	5,488	52.5
Independent	Kerry Morris	4,598	44
Amalgamate North Van	George Sifton Pringle	375	3.6

=== North Vancouver City Council election ===
Top 6 candidates elected

Council candidate	Vote	%
Craig Keating (X)	4,885	9.22
Linda Buchanan (X)	4,666	8.77
Don Bell (X)	4,491	8.48
Pam Bookham (X)	4,392	8.29
Rod Clark (X)	4,354	8.22
Holly Back	3,588	6.77
Kathy McGrenera	3,515	6.63
Bill Bell	3,346	6.32
Amanda Nichol	3,316	6.26
Matt Clark	3,113	5.88
Tony Valente	3,102	5.86
Dorothy Bell	2,900	5.47
Iani Markis	2,095	3.95
Joe Heilman	2,087	3.94
Via Fearnley	1,805	3.41
John Harvey	877	1.49
Dave Janis	326	0.62
Ron Sostad	231	0.44

== North Vancouver District ==
=== Mayoral election ===
Mayoral candidate	Vote	%
Richard Walton (X)	Acclaimed	

=== North Vancouver District Council election ===
Top 6 candidates elected

Council candidate	Vote	%
Lisa Muri (X)	7,818	11.04
Doug MacKay-Dunn (X)	7,625	10.77
Robin Hicks (X)	6,950	9.82
Jim Hanson	6,422	9.07
Mathew Bond	5,871	8.29
Roger Bassam (X)	5,825	8.23
Linda Findlay	5,510	7.78
Wayne Hunter	4,512	6.37
Glenn MacKenzie	4,352	6.15
Kevin Macauley	4,037	5.70
Len Laycock	3,505	4.95
Connie deBoer	2,872	4.06
Amelia Hill	2,781	3.93
Hazen Colbert	2,722	3.84

== Oak Bay ==
Mayoral candidate	Vote	%
Nils Jensen (X)		
Carine Green		
David Shebib		

== Penticton ==
=== Mayoral election ===
Mayoral candidate	Vote	%
Andrew Jakubeit	5,126	61.71
John Vassilaki	3,012	36.26
Jukka Laurio	169	2.03

== Pitt Meadows ==
Mayoral candidate	Vote	%
John Becker	1	
Michael Hayes		
Gary Paller		

== Port Coquitlam ==
=== Mayoral election ===
Mayoral candidate	Vote	%
Greg Bruce Moore (X)	8,632	88.98
Eric Hirvonen	1,069	11.02

=== Port Coquitlam City Council election ===
Top 6 candidates elected

Council candidate	Vote	%
Brad West (X)	6,690	13.54
Laura Dupont	5,876	11.89
Darrell Penner (X)	5,844	11.83
Mike Forrest (X)	5,349	10.83
Glenn Pollock (X)	5,173	10.47
Dean Washington (X)	4,795	9.71
Nancy McCurrach	3,984	8.06
Michael Wright (X)	3,912	7.92
Sherry Carroll	3,042	6.16
Amritpal Gill	1,627	3.29
Riyaz Lakhani	1,371	2.78
Wayne Marklund	1,046	2.12
Erhan Demirkaya	691	1.40

== Port Moody ==
=== Mayoral election ===
Mayoral candidate	Vote	%
Mike Clay (X)	4,261	55.26
Gaetan Royer	3,450	44.74

== Prince George ==
=== Mayoral election ===
Mayoral candidate	Vote	%
Lyn Hall	10,463	54.18
Don Zurowski	8,850	45.82

=== Prince George City Council election ===
Top 8 candidates elected

Council candidate	Vote	%
Brian Skakun (X)	12,674	10.34
Murry Krause (X)	10,304	8.40
Garth Frizzell (X)	8,773	7.16
Albert Koehler (X)	8,022	6.54
Frank Everitt (X)	7,788	6.35
Jillian Merrick	6,829	5.57
Terri Patricia McConnachie	6,580	5.37
Susan Scott	6,217	5.07
Debora Munoz	6,122	4.99
Dave Wilbur (X)	5,773	4.71
Bryan Mix	4,974	4.06
Cameron Stolz (X)	4,916	4.01
Trent Derrick	3,893	3.18
Jason Luke	3,678	3.00
Monica Peacock	3,529	2.88
Alex Huber	3,227	2.63
Ron Gallo	3,130	2.55
Roy Spooner	3,029	2.47
Ravi Saxena	2,846	2.32
Harry Ulch	2,809	2.29
Gregg Kauk	2,485	2.03
Foxy De-Rossi	1,956	1.60
Coralee Larsen	1,531	1.25
Ron Roberts	771	0.63
Jeffrey Ryan Cunin	746	0.61

== Quesnel ==
Mayoral candidate	Vote	%
Bob Simpson	2128	71
Mary Sjostrom (X)	884	29

== Richmond ==
=== Mayoral election ===
Party	Mayoral candidate	Vote	%
Independent	Malcolm Brodie (X)	27,149	69.78
Richmond Reform	Richard Lee	10,667	27.42
Independent	Cliff Wei	1,088	2.80

=== Richmond City Council election ===
Top 8 candidates elected

Party	Council candidate	Vote	%
Richmond First	Bill McNulty (X)	17,417	7.08
Richmond Community Coalition	Chak Au (X)	15,742	6.40
Richmond First	Linda McPhail (X)	15,679	6.37
Richmond First	Derek Dang (X)	14,844	6.03
Independent	Harold Steves (X)	14,417	5.86
Rite Richmond	Carol Day	13,389	5.44
Richmond Community Coalition	Ken Johnston (X)	12,792	5.20
Independent	Alexa Loo	12,595	5.12
Richmond First	Andy Hobbs	12,013	4.88
Rite Richmond	Michael Wolfe	11,765	4.78
Richmond Community Coalition	Dan Baxter	9,952	4.04
Richmond Community Coalition	Kirby Graeme	9,869	4.01
Richmond Community Coalition	Sal Bhullar	8,965	3.64
Independent	Dave Semple	8,566	3.48
Richmond First	Elsa Wong	8,500	3.45
Richmond Community Coalition	Helen Quan	8,375	3.40
Richmond Reform	Sunny Ho	6,926	2.81
Renew Richmond	Grace Tsang	6,222	2.53
Independent	Roy Sakata	5,824	2.37
Independent	Jerome Dickey	4,708	1.91
Independent	Henry Juin-Hsien Yao	4,412	1.79
Independent	Jennifer Huang	3,977	1.62
Renew Richmond	Adil Awan	3,587	1.46
Independent	Janos Bergman	3,248	1.32
Independent	Don Montgomery	2,997	1.22
Independent	Laura Nastasa	2,295	0.93
Independent	Patrick S. Saunders	2,108	0.86
Independent	Kristian von Schalburg	1,619	0.66
Independent	Gary Yuill	1,406	0.57
Independent	Lee Gildemeester	1,258	0.51
Independent	Jun L. Wuyan	694	0.28

== Saanich ==
=== Mayoral election ===
Mayoral candidate	Vote	%
Richard Atwell	14,178	50.98
Frank Edward Leonard (X)	13,152	47.29
David Shebib	482	1.73

=== Saanich District Council election ===
Top 8 candidates elected

Council candidate	Vote	%
Dean Murdock (X)	14,781	8.92
Colin Plant	14,778	8.92
Susan Brice (X)	14,182	8.56
Vic Derman (X)	14,046	8.47
Fred Haynes	13,492	8.14
Judy Brownoff (X)	13,162	7.94
Vicki Sanders (X)	13,002	7.84
Leif Wergeland (X)	12,107	7.30
Rebecca Mersereau	12,077	7.29
Paul Henry Gerrard (X)	11,488	6.93
Shawn Newby	11,167	6.74
Nichola M. Wade (X)	11,066	6.68
Marsha Henderson	10,416	6.28

==== City council by-election ====
Held on September 23, 2017 to replace councillor Vic Derman who had died.

Council candidate	Vote	%
Karen Harper	2,340	24.59
Rebecca Jane Mersereau	2,238	23.52
Nathalie Chambers	1,856	19.50
Michael Geoghegan	863	9.07
Ned Taylor	597	6.27
Rob Wickson	577	6.06
Shawn Selkirk Newby	465	4.89
Marsha Henderson	334	3.51
Keith Andrew Davidoff	163	1.71
Art Pollard	83	0.87

== Salt Spring Island Electoral Area ==
The results in Capital Regional District Electoral Area F (Salt Spring Island) were as follows:

=== Director election ===
Director candidate	Vote	%
Wayne McIntyre (X)	1,923	77.63
Garth Hendren	554	22.37

== Smithers ==
Candidate	Vote	%
Taylor Bachrach (X)	Acclaimed	

== Southern Gulf Islands Electoral Area ==
The results in Capital Regional District Electoral Area G (Southern Gulf Islands) were as follows:

=== Director election ===
Director candidate	Vote	%
David Howe (X)	1,988	69.58
Stephen Cropper	869	30.42

== Surrey ==
=== Mayoral election ===
Party	Mayoral candidate	Vote	%
Surrey First	Linda Hepner	48,622	48.15
Safe Surrey Coalition	Doug McCallum	27,233	26.97
One Surrey	Barinder Rasode	21,193	20.99
Independent	Grant Rice	1,698	1.68
Independent	John Edwards	1,067	1.06
Independent	Vikram Bajwa	718	0.71
Independent	John Wolanski	451	0.45

=== Surrey City Council election ===
Top 8 candidates elected

Party	Council candidate	Vote	%
Surrey First	Tom Gill (X)	50,386	7.48
Surrey First	Judy Villeneuve (X)	47,029	6.98
Surrey First	Barbara Steele (X)	42,464	6.30
Surrey First	Mary Martin (X)	41,986	6.23
Surrey First	Bruce Hayne (X)	39,939	5.93
Surrey First	Dave Woods	39,258	5.83
Surrey First	Mike Starchuk	38,352	5.69
Surrey First	Vera LeFranc	35,926	5.33
Safe Surrey Coalition	Rina Gill	27,448	4.07
One Surrey	Kal Dosanjh	26,465	3.93
One Surrey	Michael Bose	26,243	3.90
Safe Surrey Coalition	Justin Thind	23,923	3.55
Safe Surrey Coalition	Beau Simpson	19,357	2.87
Safe Surrey Coalition	Laurie Guerra	18,002	2.67
One Surrey	Narima Dela Cruz	17,679	2.62
One Surrey	Brian Young	16,939	2.51
One Surrey	Darlene Bowyer	15,384	2.28
Team Surrey	Brenda Locke	15,374	2.28
One Surrey	Maz Artang	13,904	2.06
One Surrey	Merv Bayda	13,615	2.02
Independent	Saira Aujla	12,360	1.83
Independent	Jim McMurtry	9,177	1.36
Team Surrey	Stephen Gammer	9,140	1.36
Independent	Cliff Blair	8,907	1.32
Independent	Nav Dhanoya	8,869	1.32
Independent	Tanvir S. Bhupal	8,791	1.30
Independent	Gary Hoffman	8,015	1.19
Independent	Martin Rooney	7,520	1.12
Independent	Rita Elvins	7,426	1.10
Independent	Fiona Dionne	5,525	0.82
Independent	James Duncan	5,448	0.81
Independent	Shawn Francis	5,419	0.80
Independent	Rick Scorsese	3,282	0.49
Independent	Obi Canuel	2,808	0.42
Independent	Touraj Ghanbar-Zadeh	1,387	0.21

== Tofino ==
Mayoral candidate	Party	Vote	%
Josie Osborne	Green Party	unopposed	100

== Vancouver ==
Party	Mayoral candidate	Vote	%
Vision Vancouver	Gregor Robertson (X)	83,529	45.97
Non-Partisan Association	Kirk LaPointe	73,443	40.42
Coalition of Progressive Electors	Meena Wong	16,791	9.24
Independent	Bob Kasting	1,682	0.93
Independent	Mike Hansen	714	0.39
Independent	Jeff Hill	611	0.34
Independent	Tim Ly	556	0.31
Stop Party	Meynard Aubichon	508	0.28
Independent	Cherryse Kaur Kaiser	492	0.27
Independent	Colin Shandler	459	0.25

== Vernon ==
=== Mayoral election ===
Mayoral candidate	Vote	%
Akbal Mund	3,714	38.82
Victor Cumming	3,089	32.28
Mary-Jo O'Keefe	1,312	13.71
Klaus Tribes	1,011	10.48
Jammie Morrow	442	4.58

=== Vernon City Council election ===
Top 6 candidates elected

Council candidate	Vote	%
Brian Quiring (X)	4,275	9.59
Bob Spiers (X)	4,162	9.33
Juliette Cunningham (X)	4,120	9.24
Catherine Lord (X)	4,006	8.98
Dalvir Nahal	3,969	8.79
Scott Anderson	3,805	8.53
Kari Gares	3,581	8.03
Mark Olsen	3,514	7.88
Jack Gilroy	3,451	7.74
Shawn Lee	3,271	7.34
Janet Green	3,027	6.79
James Todd	1,568	3.52
Colt Wilson	1,127	2.53
Arthur Gourley	768	1.72

== Victoria ==
=== Mayoral election ===
Mayoral candidate	Vote	%
Lisa Helps	9,200	37.63
Dean Fortin (X)	9,111	37.27
Ida Chong	3,275	13.40
Stephen Andrew	2,380	9.74
Robert Muir Duncan	253	1.03
Jason Ross	132	0.54
David Michael Shebib	62	0.25
Riga Gordon	33	0.13

=== Victoria City Council election ===
Top 8 candidates elected

Council candidate	Vote	%
Ben Isitt (X)	14,729	10.66
Charlayne Thorton-Joe (X)	12,046	8.72
Marianne Alto (X)	12,016	8.69
Jeremy Loveday	10,852	7.85
Pamela Madoff (X)	10,354	7.49
Geoff Young (X)	9,934	7.19
Margaret Lucas	8,145	5.89
Christopher Coleman (X)	8,017	5.80
Erik Benjamin Kaye	7,295	5.28
John Luton	6,850	4.96
Hilary Groos	6,653	4.81
Justin Stephenson	5,268	3.81
Andrew J. Reeve	4,336	3.14
Steve Filipovic	3,856	2.79
Ian Hoar	3,466	2.51
Paul Servos	2,577	1.86
Ryan A. Moen	2,108	1.53
Sean Murray	1,897	1.37
Jonathan Carroll	1,739	1.26
Jeffrey Olafson	1,693	1.22
Gordon MacKinnon	1,334	0.97
Saul Andersen	1,183	0.86
John Douglas Stewart	1,107	0.80
James Harasymow	764	0.55

== West Kelowna ==
=== Mayoral election ===
Mayoral candidate	Vote	%
Doug Findlater (X)	3,600	54.28
Stephen Johnston	2,750	41.47
Mary Mandarino	282	4.25

== West Vancouver ==
Mayoral candidate	Vote	%
Michael R. Smith (X)	Acclaimed	

=== West Vancouver District Council election ===
Top 6 candidates elected

Council candidate	Vote	%
Craig Cameron (X)	5,225	12.57
Nora Gambioli (X)	5,046	12.14
Mary-Ann Booth (X)	4,392	10.57
Bill Soprovich (X)	4,080	9.82
Michael Lewis (X)	3,609	8.68
Christine Cassidy	3,233	7.78
Jim Finkbeiner	3,172	7.63
Joanna Baxter	3,169	7.63
Michael Evison	3,079	7.41
Peter Lambur	2,893	6.96
Carolanne Reynolds	1,827	4.40
Terry Platt	927	2.23
Ali Mallakin	488	1.17
Max Clough	221	0.53
Jon Johnson	198	0.48
