= Linda Hepner =

Canadian politician (born 1949)

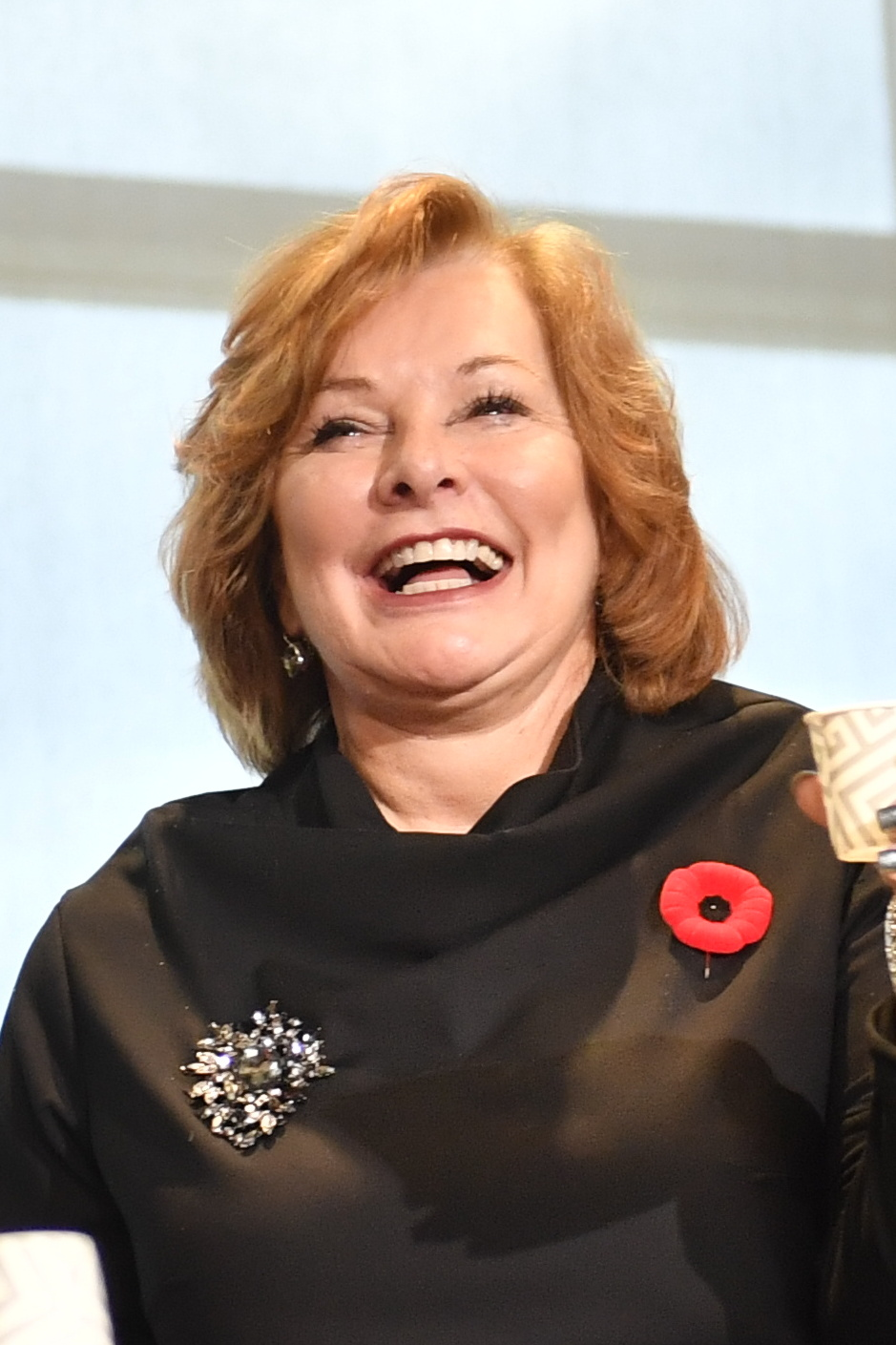
- Hepner in 2016

Member of the British Columbia Legislative Assembly for Surrey-Serpentine River
- In office October 19, 2024 – October 24, 2026
- Preceded by: Constituency established
- Succeeded by: Jessy Sahota

36th Mayor of Surrey
- In office December 8, 2014 – November 5, 2018
- Preceded by: Dianne Watts
- Succeeded by: Doug McCallum

Personal details
- Born: Linda Margaret Hepner; May 16, 1949 (age 77) Fredericton, New Brunswick, Canada
- Party: BC Conservative (before 2026, 2026–present); Surrey First (municipal)
- Other political affiliations: Independent (2026)
- Spouse: Alan McMillan
- Children: 1

Linda Margaret Hepner (born May 16, 1949) is a Canadian politician, who served as the 36th mayor of Surrey, British Columbia, as of the 2014 municipal election. As a member of the Conservative Party of British Columbia, she won a seat in 2024 provincial election and served as the member of the Legislative Assembly for Surrey-Serpentine River.

In September 2026, Hepner resigned from the Conservative Party caucus. She cited a loss of confidence in party leader Kerry-Lynne Findlay and criticized the removal that same month three other caucus members, but only 3 days later, following Findlay's resignation as party leader, she returned to caucus along with 4 other legislators.

== Personal life ==
Hepner is currently married to Alan McMillan, who is an administrator the Emily Carr Institute of Art and Design. Her only son, Gordon Hepner, is a city councillor in Surrey, and she has two grandsons through him.

== City of Surrey career ==
Hepner's career with the City of Surrey started in 1985, where she was the Manager of Economic Development, Director of Corporate Services, and Liaison to the Provincial Ombudsman. In her roles, she was responsible for the Film and Special Events section including major events such as Canada Day, Party for the Planet, and Air Canada PGA corporate events. She also supported the Council's Business Development Committee.

Hepner is a founding member of the Surrey Foundation, now known as Surrey Cares, and the Surrey Tourism Association. Her contributions include the construction of the Visitor Centre at Pacific Border Crossing and the city's Y2K Celebration.

=== City Councillor ===
Before becoming mayor, Hepner served as a Surrey city councillor for 9 years from 2005 to 2014. She was first elected to Surrey City Council in 2005 on Doug McCallum's Surrey Electors Team slate; however, McCallum himself was defeated in the mayoral race by Dianne Watts, and Hepner joined Watts' Surrey First team. During this stint, she chaired the City of Surrey's 2010 Olympic Committee which oversaw the development of a family site and oversaw Surrey's role as a place for volunteer training. This earned the city the title of the best family venue for the Olympic experience.

In addition, she led the Mayor's Committee for Red Tape Reduction in city services, the Surrey Regional Economic Summit, and the Mayor's Task Force on Investment and Job Creation. Hepner also chaired the BC Summer Games, served on the Executive Committee of the Union of BC Municipalities, and was a member of the Recycling Council of BC when developing the ReturnIt program. Other directional roles she held were in organizations including the Surrey Tourism Association, Surrey Parks and Recreation Committee, Federation of Canadian Municipalities Women in Leadership Committee, Pacific Parklands, Metro Vancouver Municipal Finance Committee, Metro Vancouver Utilities Committee, and the Surrey Development Corporation.

== Mayor of Surrey (2014–2018) ==
=== 2014 campaign and election ===
During her campaign, pollsters predicted a tight race predicting very evenly matched results. Even near the end of the campaign Hepner, Rasode, and McCallum were in a dead heat, however, results were not even close. Hepner cruised to a victory and her political slate, Surrey First, swept all eight city councillor seats. Some believe that Hepner had major advantages over her opponents including a well organized and well financed team, especially a Surrey First ground crew which mobilized quickly to get out the vote in massive numbers. Hepner also secured the significant endorsement of Dianne Watts, the outgoing mayor who had previously won 80% of the vote in the 2011 election.

The Central City Brew Pub became headquarters for election night, and upon this landslide victory, the gathering felt like a party until early morning hours.

=== Mayoral term ===
During her time as Mayor, Hepner as stated that she will "break ground" with Surrey's LRT, starting with phase 1. She promised a rider-ready LRT by 2018 during her campaign but conceded that it won't be ready by then. As a proponent of the LRT she brought to light its potential to help solve a piece of Surrey's transportation problems, defending her city's decision to build light rail rather than Skytrain. She also successfully led the initiative to relocate a large homeless population from 135A Street known as the "Surrey Strip". The camp was dismantled and over 100 people were moved to modular housing. By implementing a voluntary, individualized approach, she effectively addressed diverse issues on a case-by-case basis.

One of Hepner's most impactful achievements was guiding Surrey to be the first city in Canada to develop a Coastal Adaptation Strategy, which helped Surrey plan for future environmental challenges. In 2016 the City began to develop a Coastal Flood Adaption Strategy and in November 2019, the final strategic document was approved by council. Hepner did admit that this initiative would require a lot of money and extensive collaboration with other levels of government over funding, however she emphasized that "the cost of not investing will be much more disruptive", as widespread flooding could affect over 1,500 residents, hundred of jobs, and over $1 billion in property value and over $25 billion in truck and rail traffic.

Alongside her tenure as mayor, Hepner held positions including Vice-Chair of Metro Vancouver's Mayor's Council, Director of TransLink, and Director of Metro Vancouver. She also chaired committees including the Surrey Police Committee, the Innovation Boulevard Mental Health and Addictions Committee, and the Mayor' Task Force on Gang Reduction securing $7 million in federal funding for the task force.

After her term, Hepner decided not to seek re-election and appointed Surrey First City Councillor Tom Gill to run for mayor on the Surrey First slate. On October 20, 2018, former mayor Doug McCallum was elected to succeed her in the 2018 Surrey municipal election.

=== Achievements ===
Hepner was recognized as one of the Top 50 Influencers in British Columbia and appointed a Chair for Mental Health with Simon Fraser University. She was also honoured as an Honorary Firefighter, with a Civic Leadership Bursary awarded annually in her honour.

== Provincial political career ==
On June 20, 2024, Hepner was nominated as a Conservative Party of British Columbia candidate for the 2024 British Columbia general election, running in the Surrey-Serpentine River riding. She went on to win her seat in the Legislative Assembly of BC by 435 votes.

Hepner served as the critic for housing in the official opposition's shadow cabinet.

On September 20, 2026, Hepner resigned from the Conservative Party caucus. She cited a loss of confidence in party leader Kerry-Lynne Findlay and criticized the removal from caucus that same month of former leader John Rustad, Trevor Halford and Claire Rattée. She stated her intent continue to represent Surrey-Serpentine River independently, but 3 days later, following the resignation of Findlay after weeks internal turmoil, she returned to Conservative caucus.

== Electoral record ==
2024 British Columbia general election: Surrey-Serpentine River
Party	Candidate	Votes	%	±%	Expenditures
Conservative	Linda Hepner	9,782	49.7%	+47.8	
New Democratic	Baltej Singh Dhillon	9,347	47.5%	−3.7	
Independent	James McMurtry	554	2.8%	–	
Total valid votes		19,683	–		
Total rejected ballots					
Turnout					
Registered voters					
Conservative notional gain from New Democratic		Swing		+25.8	
Note: Changes in percentage value and swing calculated using the 2020 redistributed results.
Source: Elections BC

=== 2014 Surrey municipal election ===
Candidate	Party	Vote	%
Yes Linda Hepner	Surrey First	48,622	48.15
Doug McCallum	Safe Surrey Coalition	27,233	26.97
Barinder Rasode	One Surrey	21,193	20.99
Grant Rice	Independent	1,698	1.68
John Edwards	Independent	1,067	1.06
Vikram Bajwa	Independent	718	0.71
John Wolanski	Independent	451	0.45
