= List of mayors of Surrey, British Columbia =

Mayor of Surrey
- Incumbent; Doug McCallum since November 2, 2026
- Style: His/Her Worship; Mayor (informal)
- Member of: Surrey City Council
- Reports to: Surrey City Council
- Seat: Surrey City Hall
- Appointer: Elected by the residents of Surrey
- Term length: Four years, renewable
- Inaugural holder: Thomas Shannon
- Formation: 1880

The mayor of Surrey is the head and chief executive officer of Surrey, British Columbia, who is elected for a four-year term. The current officeholder is Doug McCallum, who has held office since November 2, 2026. The following list includes the mayors of Surrey since 1880.

== List ==
#	Mayor	Dates	Political Affiliation	Provincial Party
1	Thomas Shannon	1880		
2	William C. McDougall	1881–1882		
3	John Armstrong	1883		
4	Albert James Milton	1884		
(2)	William C. McDougall	1884–1885		
(1)	Thomas Shannon	1886–1887		
5	James Punch	1888–1890		
6	Henry Thomas Thrift and William Brown	1891		
(6); 7	William Brown and W.J. Walker	1892		
(3)	John Armstrong	1893–1897		
8	Charles Dillwyn Moggridge	1898–1900		
9	Charles Arthur Carncross	1901		
10	Daniel Johnson	1902–1903		
11	Noah Wickersham	1904		
12	Henry Bose	1905–1909		
13	Tom Sullivan	1910–1920		
14	R.D. MacKenzie	1921–1923		
15	Thomas Reid	1924–1929		
16	J.T. Brown	1930–1937		
17	John Hunter	1938–1940		
(16)	J.T. Brown	1941–1945		
18	John Russell Archibald	1946–1947		
19	Charles Schultz	1948–1955		
20	Robert Merton Nesbitt	1956–1959		
21	Frederick George Jacob Hahn	1960–1961 (Note: Resigned seat part way through the 1961 term to run in the 1961 Esquimalt—Saanich federal by-election)		
(20)	Robert Merton Nesbitt	1961 (Note: Elected in 1961 by-election)		
22	Roland John Harvey	1962–1967		
23	William Eric Stagg	1968–1969		
24	Bill Vander Zalm	1970–1976		█ Social Credit
25	Edward McKitka	1976–1978		
26	William Vogel	1978–1980		
27	Don Ross	1980–1988	█ Surrey Municipal Electors	
28	Bob Bose	1988–1996	█ Surrey Civic Electors	█ New Democratic
29	Doug McCallum	1996–2005	█ Surrey Electors Team	█ Social Credit
30	Dianne Watts	2005–2014	█ Surrey First	█ Liberal
31	Linda Hepner	2014–2018	█ Surrey First	█ Conservative
(29)	Doug McCallum	2018–2022	█ Safe Surrey Coalition	
30	Brenda Locke	2022–2026	█ Surrey Connect	█ Liberal
(29)	Doug McCallum	2026–present	█ Safe Surrey Coalition	
