= Bob Bose =

Canadian politician

Mayor of Surrey, British Columbia
- In office 1988–1996
- Preceded by: Don Ross
- Succeeded by: Doug McCallum

Personal details
- Born: c. 1932 (age 93–94)
- Party: Surrey Civic Electors

Robert J. Bose (born c. 1932) is a Canadian politician. He served as Mayor of Surrey, British Columbia from 1988 until 1996. Bose was a member of the NDP affiliated Surrey Civic Electors party. Bose lost in the 1996 elections Doug McCallum, and his defeat was attributed to the unpopularity of the provincial NDP government at the time.

Bose previously served as an alderman on the Surrey City Council from 1979–1987. After his term of mayor, he served on city council once again, from 2000–2008. He has been described as "the soul of Surrey".

His grandfather, Henry Bose, who served as Mayor of Surrey from 1905–1910, owned a farm in Surrey which has since become a local landmark.
