= Dianne Watts =

Canadian politician

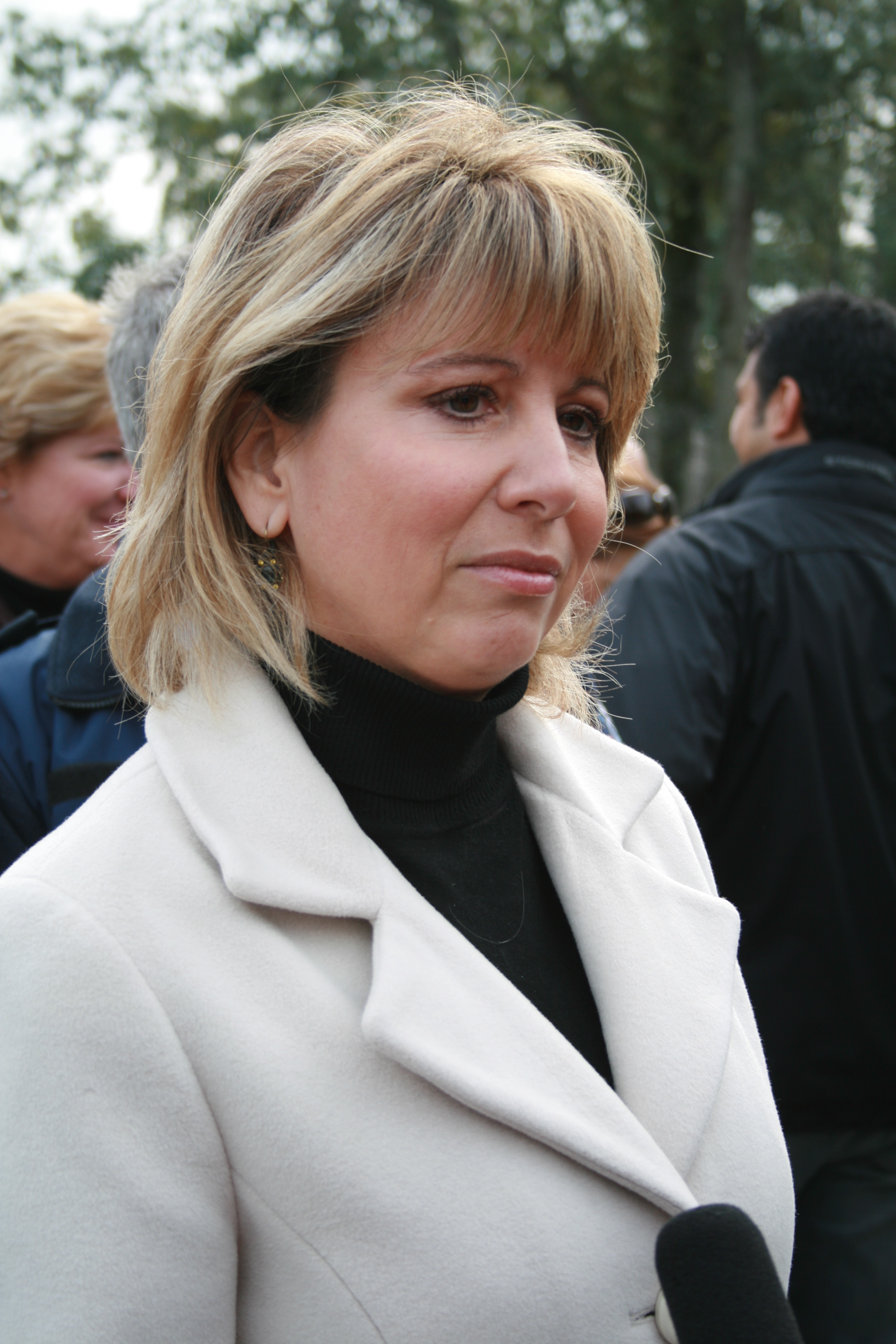

Official Opposition Critic for Employment, Workforce Development and Labour
- In office August 30, 2017 – September 24, 2017
- Leader: Andrew Scheer
- Preceded by: Pierre Poilievre
- Succeeded by: Steven Blaney

Member of Parliament for South Surrey—White Rock
- In office October 19, 2015 – September 30, 2017
- Preceded by: riding created
- Succeeded by: Gordon Hogg

35th Mayor of Surrey
- In office December 5, 2005 – December 8, 2014
- Preceded by: Doug McCallum
- Succeeded by: Linda Hepner

Surrey City Councillor
- In office December 2, 1996 – December 5, 2005

Personal details
- Born: Dianne Lynn Milan; October 30, 1959 (age 66) Vancouver, British Columbia, Canada
- Party: Surrey First (municipal); Conservative (federal); BC Liberal (provincial)
- Spouse: Brian Watts
- Children: 2
- Occupation: Politician
- Website: http://diannewattsmp.ca/

Dianne Lynn Watts (born October 30, 1959) is a former politician in British Columbia, Canada. She won her first federal election campaign in October 2015 to become a federal Member of Parliament for South Surrey—White Rock. In 2017 she resigned as MP to pursue a failed leadership bid for the BC Liberal provincial party. Previously, Watts served as the mayor of Surrey, the second-largest city in the province from 2005 to 2014. She was elected in 2005 to this office as the city's first female mayor.

== Early life ==
Watts was born on October 30, 1959. She is a second-generation Canadian with Ukrainian-Yugoslavian roots.

She studied at Mount Pleasant Elementary School and Templeton Secondary School in Vancouver's east side before moving to Kelowna.

Watts is listed in the 1974 Templeton Secondary School Annual on page 48 among 1958-born students as "Dianne Milan".

After graduating from Kelowna Secondary School, she married her first husband at the age of 18. After a divorce, she travelled and worked in Australia and other countries in the 1980s.

After her return to Canada, Watts worked as a credit manager and a materials consultant for an architecture firm during her 20s and early 30s. She married Surrey resident Brian Watts in 1992. She was a stay-at-home mother with two daughters prior to being a campaign manager for new provincial MLA and family friend Bonnie McKinnon in 1991. Watts later won a seat on city council in 1996 with Doug McCallum's Surrey Electors Team.

== Municipal politics ==
Before becoming mayor, she served on the Surrey City Council since her election in 1996.

She ran as an independent candidate, defeating incumbent Doug McCallum at the polls on November 19, 2005, who had been her political ally as recently as 2003. When she announced her intent to challenge McCallum, she claimed that a "culture of control and conflict has developed at city hall under Doug McCallum" and promised "better co-operation between the city and senior governments to bring more social services into Surrey to deal with homelessness, drug use and crime".

Her election affected regional politics as well, since she replaced McCallum on the board of the Greater Vancouver Regional District.

Watts created a political slate called "Surrey First" for the 2008 municipal elections. The slate was made up of current councillors and aspiring individuals from the community. Surrey First is not an official party and its members are reportedly free to vote their consciences on land development and other contentious issues before City Hall. On November 15, 2008, Watts defeated her lone challenger for the mayor's chair by almost 43,000 votes and all six members of her Surrey First slate—Judy Villeneuve, Tom Gill, Barbara Steele, Linda Hepner, Mary Martin and newcomer Barinder Rasode—won seats on Surrey City Council.

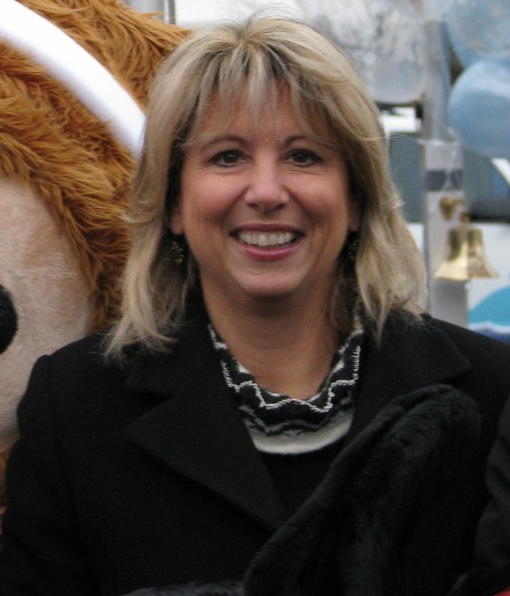
Dianne Watts at Winterfest 2008

She served a term as chair of the Mayor's Council on Regional Transportation (the board which oversees TransLink). She had also been touted as a possible future Premier of British Columbia. Watts was ultimately selected as "the fourth-best mayor in the world, according to the 2010 World Mayor Prize."

Watts was a driving force behind the controversial 2011 Surrey Regional Economic Summit, in which former US presidents George Bush and Bill Clinton were featured speakers. Amnesty International, the Canadian Centre for International Justice, the Center for Constitutional Rights, and Lawyers Against the War all called on Canadian authorities to arrest and prosecute Bush for the use of torture by U.S. forces. Amnesty International stated it had provided the RCMP with more than 4,000 pages of documents alleging that the former US president was engaged in war crimes, and called for his arrest. The human rights group stated that it had submitted a memorandum to Canadian officials outlining why Bush was legally responsible for human-rights violations that took place between 2002 and 2009. The summit was also expected to draw protests.

Watts won re-election to a third term as mayor of Surrey on November 19, 2011 with 80% of the vote. Her slate of Surrey First candidates won all seats on city council, defeating Robert (Bob) Bose, her sole opponent on Surrey City Council. The Royal Canadian Mounted Police in the Lower Mainland of British Columbia will also have their new 76,000 square metre LEED gold certified headquarters in Surrey Green Timbers Urban Forest Park, near Surrey Central City, by early 2013.

== Federal politics ==
At the April 2014 opening ceremony for the new City Hall in Surrey City Centre (formerly Whalley), Watts announced that she would not seek re-election as mayor in the November 2014 municipal election. On September 18, 2014 Watts announced that she was running for the Conservative Party of Canada nomination to replace Russ Hiebert who was retiring as federal MP for South Surrey—White Rock—Cloverdale. As of March 2015, Watts won the party's nomination by acclamation for the revised constituency of South Surrey—White Rock.

Watts won her first federal election campaign on October 19, 2015, and was the only Conservative candidate elected in Surrey's four ridings in the 2015 federal election. Watts received 44% of ballots, or 24,934 of 56,631, ahead of Liberal candidate Judy Higginbotham who received 41.5% according to unofficial Elections Canada results.

== BC Liberal leadership ==
Watts announced on September 24, 2017, her resignation from the House of Commons in order to seek the leadership of the British Columbia Liberal Party. The resignation took effect on September 30. Whilst failing to secure a plurality of votes in any of the rounds, Watts led the leadership race vote until the fifth ballot when she lost to Andrew Wilkinson.

== Personal life ==
Watts married her first husband in 1977 at the age of 18. The marriage ended in divorce. She spent the next few years travelling to places like Australia, Nepal and South America before returning to British Columbia sometime in the late 1980s. In 1992, she married her second husband Brian Watts. The couple have two daughters, Elora and Elisha. In 2009, she had three cats and three dogs. She has expressed an interest in Buddhism.

== Electoral record ==
=== Federal ===
2015 Canadian federal election: South Surrey—White Rock
Party	Candidate	Votes	%	±%	Expenditures
Conservative	Dianne Watts	24,934	44.03	-8.85	$161,579.40
Liberal	Judith Higginbotham	23,495	41.49	+22.40	$40,658.82
New Democratic	Pixie Hobby	5,895	10.41	-8.78	$38,925.44
Green	Larry Colero	1,938	3.42	-2.44	$12.62
Libertarian	Bonnie Hu	261	0.46	–	–
Progressive Canadian	Brian Marlatt	108	0.19	–	$400.00
Total valid votes/expense limit		56,631	100.00		$208,357.11
Total rejected ballots		219	0.39	–	
Turnout		56,850	74.73	–	
Eligible voters		76,078			
Conservative hold		Swing		-15.63	
Source: Elections Canada

=== Mayoral ===
==== 2011 ====
Candidate	Party	Vote	%
Dianne Watts (X)	Surrey First	55,826	80.29
Ross Buchanan	Independent	6,267	9.01
Vikram Bajwa	Independent	4,481	6.44
Clifford Inimgba	Independent	1,183	1.70
Deanna Welters	Independent	1,147	1.65
Shan Rana	Independent	330	0.47
Touraj Ghanbar-Zadeh	Independent	298	0.43
Joginder Ranhawa	Independent	0	0.00

==== 2008 ====
Candidate	Vote	%
Dianne Watts (X)	51,423	85.9
Murray Weisenberger	8,465	14.1

==== 2005 ====
Candidate	Vote	%
Dianne Watts	45,981	55.3
Doug McCallum (X)	35,558	40.3
Joe Pal	456	0.5
Joginder Singh Randhawa	448	0.5
Brady Warren Halverson	403	0.5
Jag Bhandari	327	0.4
