= Surrey First =

Municipal political party in Surrey, British Columbia

- Founder: Dianne Watts
- Founded: 2007
- Headquarters: Surrey
- Ideology: Civil society
- Political position: centre-right
- Seats on the City Council: 0 / 9
- Seats on the School board: 5 / 7

Website
- Official website

Surrey First is a civic political organization in Surrey, British Columbia, Canada. It is a non-partisan civic organization, members of which were elected to a majority on Surrey City Council in 2008.

== History ==
=== Formation ===
Surrey First was founded in 2007 by former Surrey Mayor Dianne Watts, who was first elected to a Councillor position on Surrey City Council in 1996 when she was a member of the Surrey Electors Team (SET).

In 2005, after ongoing philosophical disagreements between SET Mayor Doug McCallum, known to be progressive on social issues and fiscally conservative on economic and tax issues, Watts left SET and challenged Doug McCallum as an independent candidate for mayor. She won a convincing victory and became the first woman to be elected Mayor of Surrey, the second largest city in the province of British Columbia.

Watts embarked upon implementing a series of novel approaches and new ideas to the challenges facing Surrey, including the Surrey Crime Reduction Strategy, which has become a model for cities throughout the world. Under Watts' leadership, Surrey also became one of the first cities in Canada to implement a Whistleblower Policy aimed at protecting employees who report fraud, waste or abuse of tax dollars at City Hall. She also launched The Homelessness and Housing Foundation with a $9 million endowment, making it the first city in British Columbia to undertake such an initiative.

Other innovative initiatives launched by Watts in her first term include a Respectful Workplace Policy, a Lobbyist Registry and a Livability Accord, an agreement signed between Surrey, Abbotsford, Coquitlam and Langley to collaborate on initiatives related to crime, transportation and growth. These four cities are likely to absorb 70 percent of the growth in Metro Vancouver over the next 20 years.

Surrey also became the first City in Canada to establish economic investment zones to attract investment and create jobs as part of Watts’ Economic Investment Action Plan. The Action Plan was rolled-out in the wake of the 2008 financial crisis and was designed to foster strong economic growth through capital investment and strategic partnerships, and support the expansion of clean technology industries.

Soon after the founding of Surrey First, sitting Councillors Linda Hepner, Mary Martin and Barbara Steele resigned from SET to join Watts' slate. Independent Councillor Judy Villeneuve followed suit and thereafter Councillor Tom Gill.

== 2008–present ==
The 2008 municipal election was the first for the Surrey First slate. On November 15, 2008, Mayor Dianne Watts defeated her lone challenger for the mayor's chair by almost 43,000 votes, and all six members of her Surrey First slate – Judy Villeneuve, Tom Gill, Barbara Steele, Linda Hepner, Mary Martin and then newcomer Barinder Rasode – won seats on Surrey City Council. In 2011, Marvin Hunt joined Surrey First, making Bob Bose the only remaining city councillor not affiliated with Surrey First.

In the 2011 municipal election, Surrey First Mayor Dianne Watts was re-elected, and swept the city council. The seven Surrey First incumbent councillors were re-elected. Surrey First candidate Bruce Hayne was also elected, replacing Bob Bose from the opposition Surrey Civic Coalition, giving Surrey First total control of the city council.

In 2014, Surrey First chose Linda Hepner as its mayoral candidate for that year's municipal election. In the municipal election, Hepner was elected as mayor, defeating Doug McCallum and ex-Surrey First councillor Barinder Rasode. Surrey First also won all the city councillor seats as well as the six school trustee positions. Mike Starchuk MLA was a member from 2014 to 2018.

In April 2018, Linda Hepner announced that she would not seek re-election. In June, councillor Bruce Hayne left Surrey First, a day before the party was to select its new nominee for mayor in the upcoming October municipal election. Councillor Tom Gill was chosen as the party's candidate for mayor on June 22. On July 17, a second Surrey First councillor, Barbara Steele, quit the party. In August, another councillor, Dave Woods, resigned from the party after Surrey First's mayoral candidate Tom Gill announced his support for a handgun ban. Bruce Hayne later formed his own political slate, Integrity Now, with Steele and Woods running as councillors for the new party.

In the October 2018 Election, Linda Annis was the only Surrey First candidate elected City Councillor. The defeat was seen as being from the party schism between Surrey First and Bruce Hayne's Integrity Now, allowing Doug McCallum and his Safe Surrey Coalition to win the mayor's seat and seven out of 8 city councillor seats.

In the 2022 Election, Surrey First Councillor Linda Annis was re-elected along with Michael Bose.

In 2025, Surrey First Councillor Linda Annis was announced as Surrey First's mayoral candidate for the 2026 Surrey municipal election.

== Electoral results ==
Mayoral
Election year	Candidate	Votes	%	Position	Result
2008	Dianne Watts	51,423	85.87	1st	Elected
2011	Dianne Watts	55,826	80.29	1st	Elected
2014	Linda Hepner	48,622	48.15	1st	Elected
2018	Tom Gill	28,473	25.93	▼2nd	Not elected
2022	Gordie Hogg	24,916	21.05	▼3rd	Not elected
2026	Linda Annis	16,574	12.39	▼4th	Not elected

Surrey City Council
Election year	Votes	%	Seats	+/–
2008	222,834	55.44	6 / 8	
2011	319,382	65.15	8 / 8	▲2
2014	335,340	49.77	8 / 8	Steady
2018	195,316	25.89	1 / 8	▼7
2022	183,231	22.46	2 / 8	▲1
2026	133,653	14.5	0 / 8	▼2
