= Conservative Electors Association =

Municipal political party in Canada

- Leader: David Denhoff
- Founded: August 15, 2025
- Headquarters: 206-2832 Capilano Rd North Vancouver, BC V7R 4H5
- Ideology: Conservatism
- Political position: Centre-right to right-wing
- Colours: Blue
- Mayors (Note: Running in Chilliwack and Surrey in 2026.): 0 / 2
- Municipal councillors (Note: Running in Richmond and Surrey in 2026.): 0 / 16

Website
- Main website; Chilliwack website; Richmond website; Surrey website

The Conservative Electors Association, commonly known as the Conservatives, is a municipal political party in British Columbia, Canada. It is not affiliated with either the provincial Conservative Party of British Columbia or the federal Conservative Party of Canada.

It has registered as a municipal political party in 40 jurisdictions and school districts across the province. As of September 2026, the party is registered in the municipalities of Abbotsford, Campbell River, Chilliwack, Coquitlam, Cranbrook, Dawson Creek, Delta, Fort St. John, Golden, Grand Forks, Kamloops, Kelowna, Kitimat, Langford, Langley City, Langley Township, Maple Ridge, Merritt, Mission, Nanaimo, District of North Vancouver, Penticton, Pitt Meadows, Port Coquitlam, Prince George, Prince Rupert, Quesnel, Richmond, Saanich, Salmon Arm, Surrey, Terrace, Vancouver, Vanderhoof, Vernon, Victoria, West Kelowna, West Vancouver, White Rock, and Williams Lake.

== Foundation ==
The party was founded by political strategist David Denhoff and was registered with Elections BC on August 15, 2025.

On September 17, 2025, former MP Kerry-Lynne Findlay became the advisory board chair of the party. Her role was to help with candidate recruitment and policy development. She served in this role until February 2026, when she ran for leader of the Conservative Party of British Columbia.

== 2026 municipal elections ==
=== Candidates ===
In the 2026 British Columbia municipal elections, despite being registered in 40 municipalities, the Conservative Electors Association only nominated candidates in Chilliwack, Richmond, and Surrey.

On March 26, 2026, the party announced lawyer Honveer Singh Randhawa as the mayoral candidate in the 2026 Surrey municipal election. He was previously the BC Conservative candidate in Surrey-Guildford in the 2024 election.

On September 9, 2026, Martina Rosini was named the mayoral candidate in Chilliwack. She is a former staffer in the Office of the Premier of British Columbia, and was also the constituency assistant for Ontario MP Roman Baber.

Declined and removed candidates

The party removed Richmond mayoral candidate Sheldon Starrett on August 21, 2026, after previously announcing him as a candidate in May. He later joined Advance Richmond as a council candidate.

The party endorsed Ron Cannan's independent mayoral bid in Kelowna instead of running a candidate, with Denhoff saying "everyone knows he's conservative, so our municipal branding, it's not going to help." Previously, Denhoff tried to recruit Cannan to join the party, but he declined.

Although he did not express interest in running in the 2026 Vancouver municipal election, journalist and candidate in the 2014 Vancouver municipal election Kirk LaPointe was shown in an October 2025 Mainstreet Research opinion poll to be leading that city's mayoral race as a member of the Conservative Electors Association. He instead ran for mayor of West Vancouver as an independent. John Coupar, a former Vancouver Park Board member and Conservative Party of British Columbia candidate in the 2024 British Columbia general election for the riding of Vancouver-Little Mountain, was also leading in the Mainstreet Research poll. He decided to run for Vancouver city council with the Vancouver Liberal Electors Association. The party ended up not running any candidates in Vancouver.

=== Election results ===
Mayoral elections
Election	Municipality	Candidate	Votes	%	Elected
2026	Chilliwack	Martina Rosini			
2026	Surrey	Honveer Singh Randhawa			

Municipal council elections
Election	Municipality	Candidates	Seats	Status
2026	Richmond	5	0 / 9	TBD
2026	Surrey	8+1	0 / 9	TBD
