= Surrey Police Service =

- Badge of the Surrey Police Service
- Common name: Surrey Police
- Abbreviation: SPS
- Motto: Safer. Stronger. Together.

Agency overview
- Formed: August 6, 2020
- Preceding agencies: Surrey Police Department; Royal Canadian Mounted Police
- Employees: 1,164
- Annual budget: $184.1m

Jurisdictional structure
- Operations jurisdiction: Surrey, British Columbia, Canada
- Area: 316.41 square kilometres (122.17 sq mi)
- Population: 568,322
- Governing body: Surrey Police Board
- Constituting instrument: BC Police Act
- General nature: Local civilian police

Operational structure
- Headquarters: 14355 57 Avenue
- Sworn Officers: 659
- Civilians: 505
- Elected officer responsible: Hon. Jessy Sahota, Minister of Public Safety and Solicitor General of British Columbia
- Agency executive: Todd Matsumoto, Chief Constable

Website
- surreypolice.ca

The Surrey Police Service (SPS) is a municipal police force in the city of Surrey, British Columbia, Canada. It is one of several police departments within the Metro Vancouver Regional District, and as of December 2022, the second largest municipal police service in British Columbia. Prior to the SPS's establishment, Surrey was Canada's largest city without a municipal police service.

Until November 29, 2024, when the Surrey Police Service officially assumed command of all policing and law enforcement duties in the city, the Royal Canadian Mounted Police (RCMP), Canada's federal police force, held jurisdiction in the city. The transition to the Surrey Police Service has faced challenges, partly due to opposition from Surrey Mayor Brenda Locke and the municipal government.

== History ==
In 1887, the Surrey Police Department (SPD) was created and maintained until May 1, 1951, when the city contracted its policing to the Royal Canadian Mounted Police.

On October 20, 2018, Doug McCallum was elected as mayor after campaigning to remove the RCMP and return to a municipal police agency. On November 5, 2018, Surrey councillors (including then-councillor Brenda Locke) formally voted to begin the transition from the RCMP to the Surrey Police Service.

The Surrey Police Board was created on February 27, 2020. Norm Lipinski was appointed as the police chief in November 2020. In November 2021, the first Surrey Police Service officers were deployed alongside Surrey RCMP officers.

=== Attempted reversal to RCMP contract policing ===
In the 2022 Surrey Mayoral Election, Brenda Locke was elected as mayor of Surrey after campaigning to halt the police transition and keep the RCMP contract. On November 14, 2022, Surrey's city council voted to stop the transition.

On April 28, 2023, the provincial government recommended that the City retain the Surrey Police Service, stating that restaffing the Surrey RCMP would destabilize RCMP staffing across the province, among other concerns.

On June 16, 2023, Surrey council voted to reaffirm its decision to reverse the transition and return to RCMP policing. Subsequently, the provincial government ordered the city to continue to transition to the Surrey Police Service.

On October 13, 2023, the Surrey government filed a lawsuit against the province seeking an injunction to suspend the transition. In response, the BC Legislative Assembly passed the Police Amendment Act, 2023, which enables the Solicitor General to compel the Surrey government into completing the transition and terminating their contract with the RCMP.

On November 16, 2023, the BC Solicitor General Mike Farnworth suspended the authority of the Surrey Police Board, invoking the powers granted by the Police Amendment Act, 2023. Farnworth claimed that this was done because the Board was deliberately stalling on the transition process from the RCMP to the SPS. Mayor Locke, who was also the chair of the board, regarded this action as a "takeover" by the provincial government. Mike Serr, a former Abbotsford Police chief, was installed as an administrator to act in the Board's place.

On May 23, 2024, the BC Supreme Court dismissed the city's lawsuit, ruling that the new provincial law mandating that Surrey replace the RCMP with the SPS was constitutional.

The Surrey Police Service became the police of jurisdiction on November 29, 2024.

== Organization ==
=== Budget ===
An operational budget of $184 million was planned for the fiscal year 2021, while another $63.7 million was budgeted over five years from 2020 to 2024 to complete the transition from the RCMP.

=== Policing districts ===
The five SPS policing districts align with the city of Surrey's neighbourhood boundaries, with each district managed by a District Inspector. In addition, the Metro Team is a flexible unit responsible for a citywide patrols.

- District 1 (Whalley/City Centre)
- District 2 (Guildford/Fleetwood)
- District 3 (Newton)
- District 4 (Cloverdale)
- District 5 (South Surrey)
- Metro Team (Citywide Patrol)

=== Bureaus ===
SPS maintains three bureaus, each managed by a Deputy Chief Constable:

==== Community Policing Bureau ====
- Patrol Section
- Patrol Support Section
- Diversity and Community Support Section
- Detention Services Section
- Operations Communications Centre

==== Investigative Services Bureau ====
- Major Crime Section
- Organized Crime Section
- Special Investigations Section
- Property Crime Section
- Analysis and Investigations Support Section

==== Support Services Bureau ====
- Human Resources Section
- Professional Standards Section
- Recruiting and Training Section
- Information Management Section
- Financial Services Section
- Planning and Research Section

== List of chief constables ==
- Norm Lipinski (2020–2026)
- Todd Matsumoto (2026–present), interim

== Controversies ==
=== Opposition to municipal policing ===
Brenda Locke, the current mayor, has opposed the transition to a municipal police force since 2022. She ran for mayor on a platform to keep the RCMP and oppose the creation of a municipal police force. In 2018, however, as a city councillor, she had voted in favour of creating a municipal police force.

The RCMP police union (the National Police Federation) and some community members raised opposition to the establishment of a municipal police force. This group attempted to force a province-wide referendum on the issue in 2021, but failed to secure enough signatures for the vote to proceed.

=== Hiring ===
The Surrey Police Service planned to hire 400 officers in 2022. It was accused of poaching officers from other municipal police forces as it rapidly expanded and recruited experienced officers from 18 police forces. In 2022, the Service entered into its first contract with the Surrey Police Union, which included agreements that new recruits would be among the highest-paid in the country and a parity clause that ensured that annual raises would match those of the nearby Vancouver Police Department.

== See also ==
- E-Comm, 9-1-1 call and dispatch centre for Southwestern BC
- RCMP "E" Division, a division of federal and provincial police force headquartered in Surrey
  - Combined Forces Special Enforcement Unit – British Columbia
- Metro Vancouver Transit Police, police force dedicated to the public transit system
