= Safe Surrey Coalition =

Municipal political party in Surrey, British Columbia

- Mayor: Doug McCallum
- Headquarters: Surrey
- Ideology: Populism; Conservatism
- Political position: Centre-right to right-wing
- Seats on the City Council: 8 / 9

Website
- Official website

The Safe Surrey Coalition is a civic political party in Surrey, British Columbia, Canada.

== Members ==
- Doug McCallum
- Doug Elford
- Mandeep Nagra
- Allison Patton
- Laurie Guerra
- Meera Gill
- Suhana Gill
- Cheney Cloke

=== Former members ===
- Bableen Rana
- Steven Pettigrew
- Brenda Locke – Left to form Surrey Connect
- Jack Handial
- Beau Simpson

== Elections ==
In the municipal election held on 20 October 2018, the party won all but one seat on the Surrey City Council. That other seat was won by Linda Annis of the Surrey First party. In the municipal election held on 15 October 2022, the party lost all but two seats in the Surrey City Council to both Surrey Connect and Surrey First who both campaigned against the dissolution of the Surrey RCMP in favour of the Surrey Police Service. Despite the opposition, the provincial government mandated the transition to the Surrey Police Service.

McCallum and Safe Surrey were re-elected with a plurality in the 2026 municipal elections defeating incumbent Brenda Locke and challenger Mike Starchuk. Following their win, Mayor-elect McCallum endorsed the BC Conservative Party plan for Surrey in the 2026 provincial election.

=== Mayoral elections ===
Election year	Candidate	Votes	%	Position	Result
2014	Doug McCallum	27,233	26.97	2nd	Not elected
2018	Doug McCallum	45,484	41.43	▲1st	Elected
2022	Doug McCallum	32,338	27.31	▼2nd	Not elected
2026	Doug McCallum	42,741	31.94	▲1st	Elected

=== Council elections ===
Election year	Votes	%	Seats	+/–
2014	88,730	13.16	0 / 8	—N/a
2018	271,125	35.93	7 / 8	▲7
2022	177,153	21.7	2 / 8	▼2
2026	223,803	24.26	7 / 8	▲5
