= Doug McCallum =

Canadian politician (born 1944)

His Worship Doug McCallum

Mayor of Surrey
- Incumbent
- Assumed office November 2, 2026
- Preceded by: Brenda Locke
- In office November 5, 2018 – November 7, 2022
- Preceded by: Linda Hepner
- Succeeded by: Brenda Locke
- In office 1996 – December 5, 2005
- Preceded by: Bob Bose
- Succeeded by: Dianne Watts

Surrey City Councillor
- In office 1993–1996

Personal details
- Born: April 19, 1944 (age 82) Vancouver, British Columbia, Canada
- Party: Safe Surrey Coalition
- Other political affiliations: Social Credit (provincial); Conservative (provincial); Conservative (federal); Surrey Electors Team (municipal; 1993–2005)
- Occupation: Politician

Doug McCallum (born April 19, 1944) is a Canadian politician who has served as the mayor of Surrey, British Columbia, since November 2026. A member of Safe Surrey Coalition, he previously served as Mayor of Surrey from 1996 to 2005 and from 2018 to 2022.

McCallum was first elected to a seat on Surrey City Council in 1993. During this term he served as chair of the finance committee and sat as a member of the Parks and Recreation Commission and the library board. He was re-elected in the October 20, 2018, local elections in British Columbia. He was defeated in the 2022 election. He contested the 2026 municipal election and won a fifth term, defeating incumbent mayor and former Safe Surrey teammate Brenda Locke.

== Background ==
McCallum was first elected to Surrey City Council in the 1993 election representing the Surrey Electors Team, a party which included members of the Social Credit Party of British Columbia.

Doug McCallum was elected mayor in the 1996 election. He was seen as having pro-business and pro-development views, and campaigned on enhanced public safety and enacting the zero-based budgeting model in municipal governance to achieve zero-increase property taxes, which was a misstatement about the purpose of zero-based budgeting, which operates similarly to the planning-programming budgeting system but rather than submitting the previous operating numbers, departments or units submit zeros and councils determine a new figure.

He won re-election as Surrey's mayor in the 1999 and 2002 municipal elections.

McCallum ran again for a fourth term in the 2005 municipal elections but was soundly defeated by his emergent rival, Dianne Watts, a former fellow member of his party, the Surrey Electors Team.

McCallum then sought the Conservative Party nomination for the 2006 Canadian election in the riding on Newton—North Delta, after incumbent Gurmant Grewal stepped down. McCallum missed the deadline and instead the Conservatives chose Phil Eidsvik.

In 2010, McCallum was hired as CEO of Harness Racing of B.C.

After Watts announced she would not seek re-election in 2014, McCallum announced his intention to run for the position in the November 2014 election. Part of his Safe Surrey Coalition campaign included resistance to the city's renovating Newton Athletic Park to recruit the USL Pro team of the Vancouver Whitecaps FC. McCallum lost to Watts' successor, Linda Hepner, coming in second place with 26.97% of the votes.

In 2018, McCallum sought to regain the Surrey mayoralty after the then-incumbent Surrey mayor Linda Hepner said that she would not seek re-election. Surrey First appointed then–city councillor Tom Gill to run the Surrey First slate. In McCallum's manifesto for his Safe Surrey Coalition slate, he pledged to replace Surrey's planned light rail transit system with expanding the already existing SkyTrain network connected to Vancouver and the rest of the lower mainland. His plan would see the Expo Line extended from King George station to Langley. He also argued that Surrey's RCMP, operated by the Canadian federal government, was ineffective at combatting crime, especially the growing gang problem in North Surrey. He promised to create a new municipal "Surrey Police Force", which would operate off of pre-existing equipment and facilities. On October 20, 2018, McCallum was elected for his fourth term as the mayor of Surrey.

In 2020, McCallum was criticized in the media when he refused to allow Uber drivers to operate in the city of Surrey. McCallum said that the reason for the ban on Uber drivers was done so in order to protect the jobs of the cab drivers working in Surrey. As part of the ban against Uber, any Uber driver that was caught driving within the Surrey city limits while driving a passenger would have to pay a $500 fine.

On December 12, 2021, McCallum was charged with public mischief after a parking altercation with people against the Surrey Police Department in which he accused a woman driving a Ford Mustang of rolling over his foot. In November 2022, he was acquitted of all charges.

On October 15, 2022, McCallum was defeated in Surrey's mayoral election, and was replaced by councillor Brenda Locke. Following his defeat, McCallum allegedly returned a city-owned SUV with "significant" damage.
