= Surrey City Council =

British Columbia, Canada governing body

Type
- Type: City Council

Leadership
- Mayor: Doug McCallum, Safe Surrey Coalition
- Deputy Mayor: Mandeep Nagra, Safe Surrey Coalition

Structure
- Seats: 8 Councillors, 1 mayor
- Political groups: Safe Surrey Coalition (8) Surrey Connect (1)

Elections
- Last election: 17 October 2026
- Next election: 19 October 2030

Meeting place
- Surrey City Hall; Surrey, British Columbia

Website
- Official Website

Surrey City Council is the governing body of the City of Surrey, British Columbia, Canada. The council consists of the mayor and eight elected city councilors representing the city as a whole. Municipal elections also select six school trustees. Municipal elections are held every four years across the Province on the third Saturday of October.

== 2026-present ==
Elected in the 2026 municipal election

Name	Party	Position
Doug McCallum	Safe Surrey Coalition	Mayor
Harry Bains	Surrey Connect	Councillor
Doug Elford	Safe Surrey Coalition	Councillor
Meera Gill	Safe Surrey Coalition	Councillor
Mandeep Nagra	Safe Surrey Coalition	Councillor, Deputy Mayor
Suhana Gill	Safe Surrey Coalition	Councillor
Allison Patton	Safe Surrey Coalition	Councillor
Laurie Guerra	Safe Surrey Coalition	Councillor
Cheney Cloke	Safe Surrey Coalition	Councillor

== 2022–2026 ==
Elected in the 2022 municipal election

Name	Party	Position
Brenda Locke	Surrey Connect	Mayor
Linda Annis	Surrey First	Councillor
Harry Bains	Surrey Connect	Councillor
Mike Bose	Surrey First	Councillor
Doug Elford	Safe Surrey Coalition	Councillor
Gordon Gregory Hepner	Surrey Connect	Councillor
Pardeep Kaur Kooner	Surrey Connect	Councillor
Mandeep Nagra	Safe Surrey Coalition	Councillor
Rob Stutt	Surrey Connect	Councillor

== 2018–2022 ==
Elected in the 2018 municipal election

Name	Party	Position
Doug McCallum	Safe Surrey Coalition	Mayor
Linda Annis	Surrey First	Councillor
Doug Elford	Safe Surrey Coalition	Councillor
Laurie Guerra	Safe Surrey Coalition	Councillor
Jack Singh Hundial	Surrey Connect (elected for Safe Surrey)	Councillor
Brenda Locke	Surrey Connect (elected for Safe Surrey)	Councillor
Mandeep Nagra	Safe Surrey Coalition	Councillor
Allison Patton	Safe Surrey Coalition	Councillor
Steven Pettigrew	Independent (elected for Safe Surrey)	Councillor

== 2014–2018 ==
Elected in the 2014 municipal election

Name	Party	Position
Linda Hepner	Surrey First	Mayor
Tom Gill	Surrey First	Councillor
Judy Villeneuve	Surrey First	Councillor
Barbara Steele	Surrey First	Councillor
Mary Martin	Surrey First	Councillor
Bruce Hayne	Surrey First	Councillor
Dave Woods	Surrey First	Councillor
Mike Starchuk	Surrey First	Councillor
Vera LaFranc	Surrey First	Councillor
