= 2018 British Columbia municipal elections =

- 20 October 2018

Municipal elections were held in the Canadian province of British Columbia on October 20, 2018. Races were held in all municipalities and regional district electoral areas.

Incumbents marked with "(X)".

Selected mayoral and council races were as follows:

== Abbotsford ==
=== Mayoral election ===
Mayoral candidate	Vote	%
Henry Braun (X)	18,732	56.91
Eric Nyvall	6,159	18.71
Moe Gill	5,992	18.21
Trevor Eros	957	2.91
Gerda Peachey	560	1.70
Nadine Snow	514	1.56

=== Abbotsford City Council election ===
Top 8 candidates elected

Party	Council candidate	Vote	%
Independent	Patricia Ross (X)	18,319	9.80
Independent	Bruce Banman	17,224	9.21
Independent	Les Barkman (X)	17,223	9.21
Independent	Dave Loewen (X)	15,471	8.28
AbbotsfordFirst	Brenda Falk (X)	14,904	7.97
AbbotsfordFirst	Ross Siemens (X)	14,872	7.96
AbbotsfordFirst	Kelly Chahal (X)	12,838	6.87
Independent	Sandy Blue (X)	12,669	6.78
AbbotsfordFirst	Dave Sidhu	12,187	6.52
Independent	Paul Redekopp	11,518	6.16
Independent	Josh Reynolds	7,941	4.25
Independent	Jas Anand	5,839	3.12
Independent	Aird Flavelle	5,410	2.89
Independent	Dao Tran	5,394	2.89
Independent	Manocha Harry	5,195	2.78
Independent	Vince Dimanno	4,053	2.17
Independent	Harvey Jongsma	3,262	1.74
Independent	Tilley G. Lawrence	2,630	1.41

=== Abbotsford City Council By-election ===
A by-election was held on September 25, 2021 to replace Bruce Banman who had been elected to the Legislative Assembly of British Columbia.

Council candidate	Vote	%
Dave Sidhu	7,829	43.19
Korky Neufeld	2,448	13.50
Manjit Sohi	2,302	12.70
Dao Tran	1,346	7.42
Tom Norton	1,126	6.21
David McLauren	935	5.16
Aird Flavelle	834	4.60
Dan Dennill	755	4.16
Gerda Peachey	553	3.05

== Armstrong ==
=== Mayoral election ===
Mayoral candidate	Vote	%
Chris Pieper (X)	Acclaimed	

== Bulkley-Nechako A (Smithers Rural) Electoral Area ==
=== Director election ===
Director candidate	Vote	%
Mark Fisher (X)	401	66.61
Leah Germain	201	33.39

== Burnaby ==
2018 Burnaby municipal election

8 seats on Burnaby City Council + 1 Mayor (5 seats needed for majority)
- Mayoral election
Candidate	Mike Hurley	Derek Corrigan	Helen H. S. Chang
Party	Independent	Burnaby Citizens Association	Independent
Popular vote	26,260	20,333	2,178
Percentage	53.24	41.23	4.42
Mayor before election
Derek Corrigan
Burnaby Citizens Association
Elected mayor
Mike Hurley
Independent
- City Council election
Party	Seats	+/–
Burnaby Citizens Association	7	−1
Burnaby Green Party	1	+1
This lists parties that won seats. See the complete results below.

=== Mayoral election ===
Party	Mayoral candidate	Vote	%
Independent	Mike Hurley	26,260	53.24
Burnaby Citizens Association	Derek Corrigan (X)	20,333	41.23
Independent	Helen H. S. Chang	2,178	4.42
Independent	Sylvia Gung	549	1.11

=== Burnaby City Council election ===
Top 8 candidates elected

Party	Council candidate	Vote	%
Burnaby Citizens Association	Dan Johnston (X)	19,930	6.20
Burnaby Citizens Association	Pietro Calendino (X)	19,707	6.13
Burnaby Citizens Association	Sav Dhaliwal (X)	19,625	6.10
Burnaby Citizens Association	Colleen Jordan (X)	18,787	5.84
Burnaby Citizens Association	James Wang (X)	17,839	5.55
Burnaby Citizens Association	Paul McDonell (X)	16,760	5.21
Burnaby Citizens Association	Nick Volkow (X)	16,008	4.98
Burnaby Green Party	Joe Keithley	15,745	4.90
Burnaby Citizens Association	Baljinder Narang	15,530	4.83
Burnaby Green Party	Joel Gibbs	14,815	4.61
Burnaby Green Party	Rick McGowan	13,700	4.26
Independent	Lee Alexander Rankin	13,310	4.14
Burnaby Green Party	Mehreen Chaudry	12,600	3.92
Burnaby First Coalition	Heather Leung	12,510	3.89
Independent	Janice Beecroft	11,553	3.59
Burnaby First Coalition	Francesca Zumpano	11,508	3.58
Burnaby First Coalition	Linda Hancott	11,338	3.53
Burnaby First Coalition	Charter Lau	10,702	3.33
Burnaby Green Party	Erika Schinzel	10,580	3.29
Burnaby Green Party	Carrie McLaren	10,019	3.12
Burnaby First Coalition	John Templeton	9,855	3.06
Independent	Claire Preston	9,805	3.05
Burnaby First Coalition	Alain Deng	9,362	2.91

=== Burnaby City Council By-election ===
A by-election was held on 26 June 2021 to replace Paul McDonnell and Nick Volkow who both died in office.

Top 2 candidates elected

Party	Council Candidate	Votes	%
Preliminary results; not yet final
Burnaby Citizens Association	Alison Gu	4,994	19.36
Independent	Mike Hillman	3,227	12.51
Burnaby Citizens Association	Baljinder Narang	3,103	12.03
Independent	Lee Rankin	3,061	11.87
Burnaby Green Party	Mehreen Chaudry	2,212	8.58
Independent	Flora Lo	1,767	6.85
Independent	Heymann Yip	1,609	6.24
Independent	Martin Edward Kendell	1,445	5.60
Burnaby Green Party	Teresa Rossiello	1,170	4.54
Independent	Mike Volkow	827	3.21
Independent	Gulam Firdos	760	2.95
Independent	Claire Preston	664	2.57
Independent	Scott Van Denham	556	2.16
Independent	Deborah Skerry	400	1.55
Total votes		13,581	100.00
Registered voters/Turnout %		161,751	8.36
Source: City of Burnaby

== Campbell River ==
=== Mayoral election ===
Mayoral candidate	Vote	%
Andy J. Adams (X)	Acclaimed	

== Cariboo A (Red Bluff - Quesnel South) Electoral Area ==
=== Director election ===
Director candidate	Vote	%
Mary Sjostrom	430	50.77
Cory Delves	417	49.23

== Cariboo G (Lac la Hache - 108 Mile Ranch) Electoral Area ==
=== Director election ===
Director candidate	Vote	%
Al Richmond (X)	Acclaimed	

== Castlegar ==
=== Mayoral election ===
Mayoral candidate	Vote	%
Bruno Tassone	1,328	46.76
Deb V. McIntosh	774	27.25
Lawrence D. Chernoff	738	25.99

=== Mayoral by-election ===
A by-election for mayor was held April 24, 2021, following the resignation of Tassone who had been criticized for spending the Christmas holidays in the Okanagan despite travel regulations imposed due to the COVID-19 pandemic in British Columbia.

Mayoral candidate	Vote	%
Kirk Duff	724	30.10
Florio Vassilakakis	682	28.36
Lawrence D. Chernoff	498	20.71
Gordon Zaitsoff	311	12.93
Gord Lamont	190	7.90

== Central Saanich ==
=== Mayoral election ===
Mayoral candidate	Vote	%
Ryan Windsor (X)	Acclaimed	

== Chilliwack ==
=== Mayoral election ===
Mayoral candidate	Vote	%
Ken Popove	8,432	35.09
Sharon Gaetz (X)	7,426	30.90
Sam J. Waddington	6,988	29.08
Dave W. Rowan	775	3.23
Brigida Crosbie	409	1.70

=== Chilliwack City Council election ===
Top 6 candidates elected

Council candidate	Vote	%
Jason Lum (X)	15,604	13.84
Chris Kloot (X)	13,298	11.79
Bud Mercer	12,053	10.69
Jeff Shields	10,857	9.63
Sue Attrill (X)	10,113	8.97
Harv Westeringh	8,745	7.75
Louis De Jaeger	7,931	7.03
Terry Cross	6,310	5.60
Patti MacAhonic	6,227	5.52
Sandy Mathies	5,677	5.03
Debora Soutar	5,342	4.74
Lisa Morry	4,676	4.15
Ken Smith	3,386	3.00
Cameron Hull	2,547	2.26

== Coldstream ==
=== Mayoral election ===
Mayoral candidate	Vote	%
Jim Garlick	2,154	83.72
Bill Firman	419	16.28

== Columbia-Shuswap C (South Shuswap) Electoral Area ==
=== Director election ===
Director candidate	Vote	%
Paul Demenok (X)	812	70.61
Nancy Egely	338	29.39

== Colwood ==
=== Mayoral election ===
Mayoral candidate	Vote	%
Rob C. Martin	2,348	58.09
Carol L. Hamilton (X)	1,694	41.91

== Comox ==
=== Mayoral election ===
Mayoral candidate	Vote	%
Russ J. Arnott	2,715	62.54
Tom L. Diamond	1,626	27.46

== Comox Valley A (Baynes Sound-Denman/Hornby Islands) Electoral Area ==
=== Director election ===
Director candidate	Vote	%
Daniel Arbour	1,385	63.30
Jim Elliott	803	36.70

== Comox Valley B (Lazo North) Electoral Area ==
=== Director election ===
Director candidate	Vote	%
Arzeena Hamir	852	53.52
Rod Nichol (X)	740	46.48

== Comox Valley C (Puntledge - Black Creek) Electoral Area ==
=== Director election ===
Director candidate	Vote	%
Edwin Grieve (X)	987	62.15
Jay Oddleifson	601	37.85

== Coquitlam ==
=== Mayoral election ===
Mayoral candidate	Vote	%
Richard Stewart (X)	16,462	69.56
Adel Gamar	6,373	26.93
Mark Mahovlich	830	3.51

=== Coquitlam City Council election ===
Top 8 candidates elected

Council candidate	Vote	%
Craig Hodge (X)	14,380	9.55
Chris Wilson (X)	14,315	9.51
Teri Towner (X)	12,427	8.25
Bonita Zarrillo (X)	12,251	8.14
Brent Asmundson (X)	10,652	7.08
Dennis Marsden (X)	10,609	7.05
Trish Mandewo	8,645	5.74
Steve Kim	8,516	5.66
Robert Mazzarolo	8,507	5.65
Ben Craig	8,445	5.61
Darryl J. Stickler	7,454	4.95
Sean Lee	6,793	4.51
Rob Bottos	6,655	4.42
Nicola Spurling	5,777	3.84
Paul Lambert	5,633	3.74
Ian Soutar	2,994	1.99
Massimo Mandarino	2,461	1.63
Geoff W. Hunt	2,158	1.43
Devan Robertson	1,886	1.25

== Courtenay ==
=== Mayoral election ===
Mayoral candidate	Vote	%
Bob Wells	2,950	40.56
Larry V. Jangula (X)	2,512	34.53
Harold Long	1,165	16.02
Erik B. Eriksson	647	8.89

== Cowichan Valley B (Shawnigan Lake) Electoral Area ==
=== Director election ===
Director candidate	Vote	%
Sierra Acton (X)	919	65.50
Bill Savage	484	34.50

== Cowichan Valley C (Cobble Hill) Electoral Area ==
=== Director election ===
Director candidate	Vote	%
Michael Wilson	803	59.61
Darlene Davis	305	22.64
Matteus Clement (X)	239	17.74

== Cranbrook ==
=== Mayoral election ===
Mayoral candidate	Vote	%
Lee Pratt (X)	Acclaimed	

== Creston ==
=== Mayoral election ===
Mayoral candidate	Vote	%
Ron Toyota (X)	970	43.36
Bill Hutchinson	912	40.62
Mary Blackmore	355	15.81

== Dawson Creek ==
=== Mayoral election ===
Mayoral candidate	Vote	%
Dale Bumstead (X)	1,780	85.95
Trenten Laarz	291	14.05

== Delta ==
=== Mayoral election ===
Party	Mayoral candidate	Vote	%
Achieving For Delta	George Harvie	12,325	39.56
Independents Working for You	Jim Cressford	10,533	33.80
Team Delta	Sylvia Bishop	7,353	23.60
Independent	Moneca Kolvyn	553	1.77
Independent	Vytas Vaitkus	221	0.71
Independent	Alex Megalos	174	0.56

=== Delta City Council election ===
Top 6 candidates elected

Party	Council candidate	Vote	%
Achieving For Delta	Alicia Guichon	16,359	10.33
Achieving For Delta	Lois Jackson	14,034	8.86
Achieving For Delta	Dan Copeland	13,726	8.67
Independents Working for You	Jeannie Kanakos (X)	13,249	8.37
Independents Working for You	Bruce McDonald (X)	11,970	7.56
Achieving For Delta	Dylan Kruger	10,101	6.38
Achieving For Delta	Param Grewal	9,500	6.00
Achieving For Delta	Cal Traversy	9,052	5.72
Independents Working for You	Garry Shearer	8,710	5.50
Team Delta	Robert Campbell (X)	8,371	5.29
Team Delta	Joan Hansen	7,928	5.01
Independents Working for You	Sandeep Pandher	7,888	4.98
Team Delta	Simran Walia	6,874	4.34
Team Delta	Kim Kendall	5,507	3.48
Independent	Mike Smith	3,538	2.23
Independent	Darcy Green	3,307	2.09
Independent	Lori Mayhew	3,190	2.01
Independent	Chen Du	2,473	1.56
Independent	Kay Khilvinder Hale	1,431	0.90
Independent	Craig DeCraene	1,118	0.71

== East Kootenay C Electoral Area ==
=== Director election ===
Director candidate	Vote	%
Rob Gay (X)	Acclaimed	

== Esquimalt ==
=== Mayoral election ===
Mayoral candidate	Vote	%
Barb Desjardins (X)	2,919	72.13
John R. Roe	1,128	27.87

== Fernie ==
=== Mayoral election ===
Mayoral candidate	Vote	%
Ange Qualizza	1,122	44.52
Sharon Switzer	893	35.44
Mary Giuliano (X)	477	18.93

== Fort St. John ==
=== Mayoral election ===
Mayoral candidate	Vote	%
Lori L. Ackerman (X)	Acclaimed	

== Gibsons ==
=== Mayoral election ===
The results for mayor of Gibsons were as follows:

Mayoral candidate	Votes	%
Bill Beamish †	1,347	77.77
Blake MacLeod	200	11.37
Leslie Thomson	99	5.63
William Moysey	86	4.89

=== Gibsons Town Council election ===
The results for Gibsons Town Council were as follows:

Top 4 candidates elected

Council candidate	Vote	%
Aleria Ladwig †	1,085	61.68
Stafford Lumley (X) †	963	54.75
David Croal †	907	51.56
Annemarie De Andrade †	888	50.48
Suzanne Senger	811	46.11
Carol Doyle	806	45.65
Verna Chan	720	40.93
Angie August	192	10.92
Turnout	1,769	47.59

== Hope ==
=== Mayoral election ===
Mayoral candidate	Vote	%
Peter Robb	1,293	65.63
Wilfried Vicktor (X)	523	26.55
Cindy Young	154	7.82

== Juan de Fuca Electoral Area ==
The results in Capital Regional District Electoral Area H (Juan de Fuca) were as follows:

=== Director election ===
Director candidate	Vote	%
Mike Hicks (X)	849	82.19
Daniel Yates	184	17.81

== Kamloops ==
=== Mayoral election ===
Mayoral candidate	Vote	%
Ken Christian (X)	17,328	86.67
William J. Turnbull	2,666	13.33

=== Kamloops City Council election ===
Top 8 candidates elected

Council candidate	Vote	%
Arjun H. Singh (X)	12,203	11.26
Kathy E. Sinclair (X)	10,806	9.97
Mike S. O'Reilly	9,375	8.65
Dieter W. Dudy (X)	9,181	8.47
Dale Bass	9,059	8.36
Denis J. Walsh (X)	7,906	7.29
Sadie A. Hunter	7,441	6.86
Bill B. Sarai	7,218	6.66
Ray S. Dhaliwal (X)	6,486	5.98
Stephen J. Karpuk	6,334	5.84
Gerald K. Watson	6,088	5.62
Caroline F. King	6,001	5.54
Donovan M. Cavers (X)	5,705	5.26
Alison M. Klie	4,589	4.23
Dennis D. Giesbrecht	4,562	4.21
Jennifer D. Adams	4,367	4.03
Jimmy J. Johal	3,851	3.55
Chris C. Bose	3,305	3.05
Nicholas J. Adams	2,820	2.60
Corally H. Delwo	2,635	2.43
Shawn Harnett	1,477	1.36

== Kelowna ==
=== Mayoral election ===
Mayoral candidate	Vote	%
Colin Basran (X)	18,118	56.95
Tom Dyas	9,518	29.92
Bobby C. Kennedy	2,671	8.40
Bob Schewe	1,507	4.74

=== Kelowna City Council election ===
Top 8 candidates elected

Council candidate	Vote	%
Maxine DeHart (X)	16,706	8.98
Gail M. Given (X)	16,323	8.77
Luke H. Stack (X)	15,150	8.14
Brad Sieben (X)	14,675	7.89
Mohini Singh (X)	14,586	7.84
Charlie W. Hodge (X)	14,429	7.75
Ryan J. Donn (X)	13,236	7.11
Loyal W. Wooldridge	12,495	6.71
Gord Lovegrove	10,886	5.85
Graeme James	8,789	4,72
Amarjit Singh Lalli	8,087	4.35
Sargent Dustin	7,688	4.13
Lindsay Bell	5,897	3.17
Craig Hostland	5,239	2.82
Mark J. Boyer	4,136	2.22
Kevin Bond	3,550	1.91
Jeff Piattelli	3,243	1.74
Wayne Carson	3,114	1.67
Mo Rajabally	3,067	1.65
Greg Dahms	2,829	1.52
Stefanie L. Van Meeteren	1,974	1.06

== Kent ==
=== Mayoral election ===
Mayoral candidate	Vote	%
Sylvia Pranger	Acclaimed	

== Kimberley ==
=== Mayoral election ===
Mayoral candidate	Vote	%
Don McCormick (X)	1,674	59.24
Albert Hoglund	1,152	40.76

== Kitimat ==
=== Mayoral election ===
Mayoral candidate	Vote	%
Philip Germuth	1,958	82.03
David Johnston	429	17.97

== Ladysmith ==
=== Mayoral election ===
Mayoral candidate	Vote	%
Aaron Stone (X)	Acclaimed	

== Lake Country ==
=== Mayoral election ===
Mayoral candidate	Vote	%
James W. Baker (X)	1,479	53.88
Barry L. Rhodes	1,266	46.12

== Langford ==
=== Mayoral election ===
Mayoral candidate	Vote	%
Stewart Young (X)	3,939	83.29
Robert R. Fraser	790	16.71

== Langley City ==
=== Mayoral election ===
Mayoral candidate	Vote	%
Val van den Broek	2,446	50.62
Peter Fassbender	2,240	46.36
Serena Oh	146	3.02

== Langley Township ==
=== Mayoral election ===
Mayoral candidate	Vote	%
Jack Froese (X)	14,855	59.25
Anna Remenik	8,407	33.53
Alex Joehl	1,809	7.22

=== Langley District Council election ===
Top 8 candidates elected

Council candidate	Vote	%
David Davis (X)	12,029	7.54
Eric Woodward	11,600	7.27
Kim Richter (X)	10,007	6.28
Bob Long (X)	9,493	5.95
Blair Whitmarsh (X)	9,229	5.79
Steve Ferguson	9,176	5.75
Petrina Arnason (X)	8,734	5.48
Margaret Kunst	8,543	5.36
Angie Quaale (X)	8,440	5.29
Michael V. Pratt	8,169	5.12
Michelle Sparrow (X)	7,939	4.98
Harold Whittell	7,654	4.80
Bev Dornan	7,208	4.52
Kerri Ross	6,270	3.93
Michelle Connerty	5,736	3.60
Jonathan P. Houweling	5,700	3.57
Gail R. Chaddock-Costello	5,298	3.32
Phyllis Heppner	4,843	3.04
Craig Teichrieb	4,539	2.85
Stacey Wakelin	3,835	2.40
Sunny Hundal	2,519	1.58
Gary Hee	1,654	1.04
Terry Sheldon	848	0.53

== Maple Ridge ==
=== Mayoral election ===
Mayoral candidate	Vote	%
Mike Morden	11,287	56.62
Ernie Daykin	4,481	22.48
Craig R. Speirs	3,258	16.34
Douglas Blamey	574	2.88
Mike Shields	336	1.69

=== Maple Ridge City Council election ===
Top 6 candidates elected

Council candidate	Vote	%
Judy Dueck	8,597	8.76
Gordy Robson (X)	7,738	7.89
Chelsa Meadus	7,441	7.58
Ahmed Yousef	6,871	7.00
Ryan Svendsen	6,415	6.54
Kiersten Duncan (X)	5,979	6.09
Susan Carr	5,887	6.00
Peter Tam	5,732	5.84
Don Mitchell	4,995	5.09
Al Robbie	4,304	4.39
Hayner Mike	3,705	3.78
Bhupinder Johar	3,702	3.77
Terry Kennedy	3,247	3.31
Lou Jose	3,067	3.13
Chris Bossley	2,957	3.01
Chris O'Brian	2,758	2.81
Elizabeth Taylor	2,749	2.80
Onyeka Dozie	2,738	2.79
Rysa R. Kronebusch	2,421	2.47
Pozsar Andrew	2,313	2.36
Rick Pennykid	1,515	1.54
Glenn Schaffrick	859	0.88
Michael Tuzzi	824	0.84
Kevin Priebe	686	0.70
Hegedus Andrew	633	0.65

== Merritt ==
=== Mayoral election ===
Mayoral candidate	Vote	%
Linda Brown	1,253	51.48
Neil Menard (X)	626	25.72
Susan Roline	555	22.80

== Metro Vancouver Electoral Area A ==
=== Director election ===
Director candidate	Vote	%
Justin LeBlanc	Acclaimed	

== Mission ==
=== Mayoral election ===
Mayoral candidate	Vote	%
Pam Alexis	5,166	59.69
Randy Hawes (X)	2,541	29.36
Wyatt Scott	723	8.35
Iain Gilfillan	225	2.60

=== Mission District Council election ===
Top 6 candidates elected

Council candidate	Vote	%
Jag Gill	4,269	10.34
Cal Crawford	3,777	9.15
Carol Hamilton (X)	3,611	8.75
Danny Plecas (X)	3,486	8.45
Ken Herar	2,847	6.90
Mark Davies	2,521	6.11
Carla Janis	2,472	5.99
Jim Hinds (X)	2,317	5.61
Jennifer Holmes	2,090	5.06
Mike Nenn	1,871	4.53
Ashley Sharpe	1,766	4.28
Jeff Jewell	1,753	4.25
Doug Lifford	1,667	4.04
Dave Westley	1,322	3.20
Tracey Lee Norman	1,317	3.19
Neil Smith	1,258	3.05
Kelly Apostoliuk	1,236	2.99
Anne Graham	1,158	2.81
Alan Pedersen	532	1.29

=== Mayoral by-election ===
A by-election for mayor was held April 24, 2021 to replace Alexis who had been elected to the BC legislature.

Mayoral candidate	Vote	%
Paul Horn	2,122	41.73
Rhett Nicholson	1,083	21.30
Nelson Tilbury	736	14.47
Dave Perritt	675	13.27
Colin Renkema	409	8.04
Earl Babich	60	1.18

== Nanaimo ==
=== Mayoral election ===
Mayoral candidate	Vote	%
Leonard Krog	20,040	73.66
Don H. Hubbard	6,802	25.00
Raymon T. Farmere	365	1.34

=== Nanaimo City Council election ===
Top 8 candidates elected

Council candidate	Vote	%
Erin Hemmens	15,937	8.6
Sheryl Dawn Armstrong (X)	15,817	8.54
Ben Geselbracht	15,136	8.17
Tyler J. Brown	14,935	8.06
Jim Turley	11,649	6.29
Don Bonner	9,674	5.22
Ian W. Thorpe (X)	8,993	4.85
Zeni Maartman	8,558	4.62
Jeet Manhas	5,994	3.23
Norm E. Smith	5,824	3.14
Gary Korpan	5,451	2.94
Wendy Pratt (X)	5,092	2.75
Peter H. Kent	4,776	2.58
Peter Urquhart	4,683	2.53
Brian Loos	4,322	2.33
Jerry Hong (X)	4,063	2.19
Guy Beaulieu	3,921	2.12
Michael Ribicic	3,690	1.99
Noah Routley	3,629	1.96
Alexis Petersen	3,606	1.95
Darcy Olsen	3,482	1.88
Pele L. Gouda	2,686	1.45
Bill W. Manners	2,074	1.12
Rick Smith	2,023	1.09
Ashley B. Zboyovsky	2,023	1.09
Lloyd W. MacIlquham	1,962	1.06
Gordon W. Fuller (X)	1,930	1.04
Brunie Brunie	1,774	0.96
Viraat Thammanna	1,760	0.95
Rae Kornberger	1,555	0.84
Kevin B. Storrie	1,411	0.76
Trent R. Whaley	1,273	0.69
Al Thompson	1,042	0.56
David Simpson	945	0.51
Fred Statham	856	0.46
Richard Scott	692	0.37
Conrad Peach	667	0.36
Avel Turnip	610	0.33
Ken Osborn	605	0.33
Bob J. Breuker	198	0.11

== Nanaimo A (South Wellington, Cassidy, Cedar) Electoral Area ==
=== Director election ===
Director candidate	Vote	%
Keith Wilson	550	58.95
Sharon Thompson	383	41.05

== Nanaimo E (Nanoose) Electoral Area ==
=== Director election ===
Director candidate	Vote	%
Bob Rogers (X)	Acclaimed	

== Nanaimo F (Coombs, Hilliers, Errington) Electoral Area ==
=== Director election ===
Director candidate	Vote	%
Leanne Salter	638	68.24
Ceri Peacey	297	31.76

== Nanaimo G (Dashwood, Englishman River, French Creek) Electoral Area ==
=== Director election ===
Director candidate	Vote	%
Clarke Gourlay	759	41.36
Lehann Wallace	735	40.05
Duane Round	341	18.58

== Nelson ==
=== Mayoral election ===
Mayoral candidate	Vote	%
John Dooley	2,290	53.07
Debra Kozak (X)	1,904	44.13
Bernie Brown	121	2.80

=== Council election ===
Top 6 candidates elected

Council Candidate	Vote	%
Richard Logtenberg	1,923	44.57
Brittny Anderson	1,862	43.15
Jesse Woodward	1,813	42.02
Calvin Renwick	1,765	40.90
Janice Morrison (X)	1,578	36.57
Keith Page	1,389	32.19
Rob Richichi	1,058	24.52
Robin Cherbo (X)	1,052	24.38
Margaret Stacey	1,049	24.31
Michelle Hillaby	1,037	24.03
Robbie Kalabis	1,031	23.89
Joseph Reiner	944	21.88
Robert Adams (X)	939	21.76
Brian Shields	912	21.14
Travis Hauck	864	20.02
Leslie Payne	819	18.98
Laureen Barker	712	16.50
Stephanie Wiggins	682	15.81
Charles Jeanes	254	5.89

== New Westminster ==
=== Mayoral election ===
Mayoral candidate	Vote	%
Jonathan X. Cote (X)	10,487	72.99
Nikki Binns	1,850	12.88
Harm J. Woldring	1,512	10.52
Jimmie Bell	519	3.61

=== New Westminster City Council election ===
Top 6 candidates elected

Party	Council candidate	Vote	%
Independent	Nadine Nakagawa	7,764	10.84
Independent	Patrick Johnstone (X)	7,270	10.15
Independent	Mary Trentadue (X)	7,202	10.05
Independent	Jaimie McEvoy (X)	6,799	9.49
Independent	Chinu Das	6,716	9.38
Independent	Chuck Puchmayr (X)	6,595	9.21
New West Progressives	Daniel Fontaine	5,297	7.40
New West Progressives	Ellen Vaillancourt	4,760	6.65
New West Progressives	Paul McNamara	4,531	6.33
New West Progressives	Bryn Ward	4,490	6.27
Independent	Mike Ireland	3,253	4.54
Independent	Angela Sealy	3,013	4.21
Independent	Troy Hunter	2,638	3.68
Independent	Benny Ogden	1,299	1.81

== North Cowichan ==
=== Mayoral election ===
Mayoral candidate	Vote	%
Al Siebring	3,017	38.20
Jon Lefebure (X)	3,007	38.07
Joyce Behnsen	1,874	23.73

== North Saanich ==
=== Mayoral election ===
Mayoral candidate	Vote	%
Geoff Orr	2,592	64.69
Dorothy Hartshorne	1,415	35.31

== North Vancouver City ==
=== Mayoral election ===
Mayoral candidate	Vote	%
Linda Buchanan	3,800	29.71
Guy Heywood	3,399	26.58
Rod Clark	2,828	22.11
Kerry Morris	1,987	15.54
Michael A. Willcock	545	4.26
Payam Azad	230	1.80

=== North Vancouver City Council election ===
Top 6 candidates elected

Council candidate	Vote	%
Don Bell (X)	6,091	9.68
Angela Girard	5,109	8.12
Tony Valente	4,539	7.21
Jessica McIlRoy	4,465	7.09
Tina Hu	3,767	5.99
Holly Back (X)	3,662	5.82
Mack McCorkindale	3,525	5.60
Bill Bell	3,375	5.36
Robert Fearnley	3,253	5.17
Antje Wilson	3,228	5.13
Shervin Shahriari	3,187	5.06
Anna Boltenko	2,903	4.61
Joe Heilman	2,662	4.23
Kenneth Izatt	2,305	3.66
Alborz Jaberolansar	2,123	3.37
Brett Thorburn	1,722	2.74
Ron Polly	1,717	2.73
Mica Jensen	1,177	1.87
John McCann	1,177	1.87
Max Zahedi	1,177	1.87
Aaron Lobo	585	0.93
Pooneh Alizadeh	469	0.75
Thomas Tofigh	426	0.68
Ron Sostad	294	0.47

== North Vancouver District ==
=== Mayoral election ===
Party	Mayoral candidate	Vote	%
Independent	Mike Little	13,350	59.76
Building Bridges Electors Society	Ash Amlani	5,074	22.71
Independent	Glen Webb	2,691	12.05
Independent	Erez Barzilay	778	3.48
Independent	Dennis Maskell	447	2.00

=== North Vancouver District Council election ===
Top 6 candidates elected

Party	Council candidate	Vote	%
Independent	Lisa Muri (X)	12,029	10.59
Independent	Jim Hanson (X)	9,728	8.56
Independent	Betty Forbes	9,214	8.11
Independent	Megan Curren	8,342	7.34
Building Bridges Electors Society	Mathew Bond (X)	7,817	6.88
Independent	Jordan Back	7,368	6.49
Independent	Barry Forward	7,267	6.40
Building Bridges Electors Society	Carleen Thomas	6,885	6.06
Independent	Linda Findlay	6,346	5.59
Independent	ZoAnn Morten	6,173	5.43
Independent	Robin Hicks (X)	5,926	5.22
Independent	Mitchell Baker	4,865	4.28
Building Bridges Electors Society	Sameer Parekh	4,745	4.18
Independent	Peter Teevan	4,548	4.00
Independent	Phil Dupasquier	4,505	3.97
Independent	Mark Elliott	4,435	3.90
Independent	Greg Robins	2,546	2.24
Independent	John Harvey	848	0.75

=== Referendums ===
Do you support the establishment and funding, not to exceed $100,000, of an advisory body comprised jointly of residents of the City of North Vancouver and residents of the District of North Vancouver to investigate the costs, benefits and potential implications of reunifying the two municipalities?
Choice	Votes	%
Yes	16,521	79.07
No	4,372	20.93

Do you authorize the District of North Vancouver to spend up to $150 Million to create not less than 1000 units of non-market housing to be constructed not later than January, 2029?
Choice	Votes	%
Yes	10,645	51.64
No	9,967	48.36

== Oak Bay ==
=== Mayoral election ===
Mayoral candidate	Vote	%
Kevin Murdoch	5,042	70.22
Nils Jensen (X)	2,138	29.78

== Osoyoos ==
=== Mayoral election ===
Mayoral candidate	Vote	%
Sue McKortoff (X)	1,379	89.49
Doug Pederson	162	10.51

== Parksville ==
=== Mayoral election ===
Mayoral candidate	Vote	%
Ed Mayne	2,567	59.64
Kirk Oates	1,518	35.27
Christopher Long	219	5.09

== Peace River B Electoral Area ==
=== Director election ===
Director candidate	Vote	%
Karen Goodings (X)	Acclaimed	

== Peace River C Electoral Area ==
=== Director election ===
Director candidate	Vote	%
Bradley Sperling (X)	Acclaimed	

== Peace River D Electoral Area ==
=== Director election ===
Director candidate	Vote	%
Leonard Hiebert (X)	Acclaimed	

== Peachland ==
=== Mayoral election ===
After Cindy Fortin and Harry Gough each won 804 votes, Fortin was re-elected when her name was drawn from a box.

Mayoral candidate	Vote	%
Cindy Fortin (X)	804	34.33
Harry Gough	804	34.33
Eric Hall	372	15.88
Keith Thomas	346	14.77
Bob Henderson	16	0.68

== Penticton ==
=== Mayoral election ===
Mayoral candidate	Vote	%
John Vassilaki	5,144	47.82
Jason Cox	2,621	24.36
Andrew Jakubeit (X)	2,564	23.83
James Blake	312	2.90
Dominic M. Wheeler	76	0.71
Jukka Laurio	41	0.38

== Pitt Meadows ==
=== Mayoral election ===
Mayoral candidate	Vote	%
Bill Dingwall	4,308	78.21
John Becker (X)	1,200	21.79

== Port Alberni ==
=== Mayoral election ===
Mayoral candidate	Vote	%
Sharie M. Minions	2,003	32.28
Denis E. Sauve	1,472	23.72
Mike E. Ruttan (X)	1,181	19.03
John M. Douglas	872	14.05
Kevin A. Wright	523	8.43
Gary E. Robertson	155	2.50

== Port Coquitlam ==
=== Mayoral election ===
Mayoral candidate	Vote	%
Brad D. West	10,236	88.09
Robin G. Smith	952	8.19
Eric R. Hirvonen	235	2.02
Patrick H. Alambets	197	1.70

=== Port Coquitlam City Council election ===
Top 6 candidates elected

Council candidate	Vote	%
Laura L. Dupont (X)	6,518	10.66
Glenn A. Pollock (X)	6,056	9.90
Darrell G. Penner (X)	6,045	9.88
Steve W. Darling	6,025	9.85
Dean Washington (X)	5,563	9.10
Nancy L. McCurrach	5,298	8.66
Michael W. Forrest (X)	4,733	7.74
Darin E. Nielsen	3,992	6.53
Dawn E. Becker	3,567	5.83
Priscilla A. Omulo	2,657	4.34
Carolyn Stewart	1,981	3.24
Robert C. Delagiroday	1,513	2.47
Vince J. Donnelly	1,341	2.19
Jami L. Watson	1,328	2.17
Justin M. Traviss	1,298	2.12
Erhan Demirkaya	911	1.49
Shakeel M. Gaya	783	1.28
David L. Blaber	782	1.28
Tommy P. Raguero	763	1.25

== Port Moody ==
=== Mayoral election ===
Mayoral candidate	Vote	%
Rob Vagramov	4,545	52.21
Mike Clay (X)	4,161	47.79

== Powell River ==
=== Mayoral election ===
Mayoral candidate	Vote	%
David J. Formosa (X)	2,642	55.06
Ronald J. Woznow	1,992	41.52
Glenn S. Holstine	164	3.42

== Prince George ==
=== Mayoral election ===
Mayoral candidate	Vote	%
Lyn Hall (X)	11,702	91.80
Willy Ens	1,045	8.20

=== Prince George City Council election ===
Top 8 candidates elected

Council candidate	Vote	%
Brian Skakun (X)	9,475	71.87
Kyle Sampson	8,304	62.99
Garth Frizzell (X)	8,199	62.19
Murry Krause (X)	8,008	60.74
Susan Scott (X)	7,775	58.97
Terri P. McConnachie (X)	7,111	53.94
Frank Everitt (X)	6,680	50.67
Cori Ramsay	5,693	43.18
Dave Fuller	5,001	37.93
Cameron Stolz	4,971	37.70
Viv Fox	3,697	28.04
Chris Wood	2,266	17.19
Paul Serup	1,746	13.24

== Prince Rupert ==
=== Mayoral election ===
Mayoral candidate	Vote	%
Lee Brain (X)	Acclaimed	

== Qualicum Beach ==
=== Mayoral election ===
Mayoral candidate	Vote	%
Brian Wiese	2,581	56.50
Anne Skipsey	1,987	43.50

== Quesnel ==
=== Mayoral election ===
Mayoral candidate	Vote	%
Bob Simpson (X)	Acclaimed	

=== Quesnel City Council election ===
Top 6 candidates elected

Council candidate	Vote	%
Scott Elliot (X)	1,417	15.18
Mitch Vik	1,230	13.18
Ron Paull	1,111	11.90
Laurey-Anne Roodenburg (X)	1,101	11.80
Martin Runge	894	9.58
Tony Goulet	888	9.51
Susan MacNeill	706	7.56
Tammy Burrows	626	6.71
Fritz Wyssen	542	5.81
Lindsay Woods	419	4.49
Kyle Townsend	400	4.29

== Revelstoke ==
=== Mayoral election ===
Mayoral candidate	Vote	%
Gary Sulz	2,216	93.42
Darcy Wyonzek	156	6.58

== Richmond ==
=== Mayoral election ===
Mayoral candidate	Vote	%
Malcolm Brodie (X)	30,452	64.26
Roy Sakata	7,942	16.76
Donald Flintoff	4,204	8.87
Hong Guo	2,940	6.20
Lawrence Chen	1,260	2.66
Cliff Wei	594	1.25

=== Richmond City Council election ===
Top 8 candidates elected

Party	Council candidate	Vote	%
RITE Richmond	Carol Day (X)	20,871	7.01
Richmond Citizens' Association	Harold Steves (X)	19,136	6.43
Richmond Community Coalition	Chak Au (X)	18,026	6.05
Richmond First	Bill McNulty (X)	17,242	5.79
Richmond Citizens' Association	Kelly Greene	16,464	5.53
Richmond First	Linda McPhail (X)	15,521	5.21
RITE Richmond	Michael Wolfe	13,627	4.58
Independent	Alexa Loo (X)	13,212	4.44
Richmond First	Derek Dang (X)	13,115	4.40
Richmond First	Andy Hobbs	12,336	4.14
Richmond Citizens' Association	Judie Schneider	11,672	3.92
Richmond Community Coalition	Ken Johnston (X)	11,161	3.75
Richmond Community Coalition	Jonathan Ho	11,140	3.74
Richmond Citizens' Association	Jack Trovato	10,915	3.67
Richmond First	Sunny Ho	8,933	3.00
RITE Richmond	Niti Sharma	8,917	2.99
RITE Richmond	Henry Yao	8,467	2.84
Richmond First	Peter Liu	8,357	2.81
Richmond Community Coalition	Parm Bains	7,973	2.68
Independent	John Roston	7,961	2.67
Richmond Community Coalition	Melissa Zhang	7,708	2.38
Independent	Kerry Starchuk	6,959	2.34
Independent	Jason Tarnow	5,720	1.92
Independent	Adil Awan	4,278	1.44
Independent	Manjit Singh	4,134	1.39
Independent	Dennis Page	3,478	1.17
Independent	Andy Chiang	3,337	1.12
Independent	Theresa Head	3,251	1.09
Independent	Patrick J. Saunders	2,241	0.75
Independent	Zhe Zhang	2,241	0.75

=== Richmond School Board Trustees ===
Top 7 candidates elected

Trustee candidate	Vote
Ken Hamaguchi (X)	17,196
Sandra Nixon (X)	16,567
Donna Sargent (X)	15,947
Heather Larson	13,258
Debbie Tablotney (X)	13,243
Richard Lee	12,266
Norm Goldstein	11,234
Karina Reid	11,064
Alice Wong (X)	10,958
Eric Yung (X)	9,559
Andrew Scallion	9,148
James Li	9,000
Grace Tsang	8,978
Jeff Denis	8,960
Rod Belleza	8,686
Ivan Pak	8,244
Charvine Adl	7,834
Elsa Wong	7,711
Jeffery Smith	7,517
Keith Liedtke	6,555
Andrea Gong-Quinn	6,550
Rahim Othman	5,632
Harv Puni	5,272
Jason Zhen Ning Li	5,139
Sharon Wang	4,361
Sergio Arrambide	2,458

=== Richmond City Council By-election ===
A by-election was held on 29 May 2021 to replace Kelly Greene, who has been elected to the BC Legislative Assembly. Independent Andy Hobbs won.

One candidate elected

Party	Council Candidate	Votes	%
Independent	Andy Hobbs	3,095	23.84
Richmond Community Coalition	Jonathan Ho	2,785	21.45
RITE Richmond	Karina Reid	2,767	21.31
Richmond Community and Education Party	Ken Hamaguchi	1,515	11.67
Independent	Khilvinder Kay Hale	708	5.45
Independent	Sunny Ho	693	5.34
Independent	Jennifer Huang	655	5.04
Independent	John Roston	446	3.43
Independent	Mark Lee	239	1.84
Independent	Dennis Page	81	0.62
Total votes		12,984	100.00
Total rejected ballots		18	0.14
Turnout		13,002	9.16
Registered voters/turnout		141,675	
Source: City of Richmond

== Saanich ==
=== Mayoral election ===
Party	Mayoral candidate	Vote	%
Independent	Fred Haynes	15,312	47.90
United For Saanich	Richard Atwell (X)	10,786	33.74
Independent	Rob Wickson	5,546	17.35
Independent	David Shebib	324	1.01

=== Saanich District Council election ===
Top 8 candidates elected

Party	Council candidate	Vote	%
Independent	Rebecca J. Mersereau	18,416	9.31
Independent	Colin Plant (X)	17,749	8.98
Independent	Ned Taylor	16,047	8.12
Independent	Susan Brice (X)	15,981	8.08
Independent	Zac de Vries	13,631	6.89
Independent	Judy Brownoff (X)	13,594	6.88
Independent	Nathalie Chambers	13,080	6.62
United For Saanich	Karen Harper (X)	11,713	5.92
United For Saanich	Kathleen Burton	11,289	5.71
Independent	Shawn Newby	11,010	5.57
Independent	Rishi Sharma	10,127	5.12
United For Saanich	Ian Jessop	9,606	4.86
Independent	Teale Phelps Bondaroff	9,043	4.57
United For Saanich	Cory Montgomery	8,695	4.40
Independent	Trevor Barry	5,541	2.80
Independent	Benjamin Allan	5,209	2.63
Independent	Art Pollard	3,675	1.86
Independent	Vernon D. Lord	3,300	1.67

== Salmon Arm ==
=== Mayoral election ===
Mayoral candidate	Vote	%
Alan R. Harrison	3,387	59.83
Nancy J. Cooper (X)	1,516	26.78
Jim T. Kimmerly	758	13.39

== Salt Spring Island Electoral Area ==
=== Director election ===
Director candidate	Vote	%
Gary Holman	2,307	66.58
Robin Williams	1,158	33.42

== Sidney ==
=== Mayoral election ===
Mayoral candidate	Vote	%
Cliff McNeil-Smith	3,740	80.10
Steve Price (X)	929	19.90

== Sechelt ==
=== Mayoral election ===
Mayoral candidate	Vote	%
Darnelda Siegers	2,513	61.13
Bruce Milne (X)	1,111	27.03
Allan Holt	487	11.71

== Smithers ==
=== Mayoral election ===
Mayoral candidate	Vote	%
Taylor Bachrach (X)	1,137	64.02
Randy Bell	639	35.98

=== Mayoral by-election ===
A by-election was held on October 17, 2020 to replace Bachrach who was elected to the House of Commons.

Mayoral candidate	Vote	%
Gladys Atrill	963	74.71
Joe Bramsleven	326	25.29

== Sooke ==
=== Mayoral election ===
Mayoral candidate	Vote	%
Marja Tait (X)	2,299	56.67
Kevin Pearson	1,623	40.00
Mick Rhodes	135	3.33

== Southern Gulf Islands Electoral Area ==
The results in Capital Regional District Electoral Area G (Southern Gulf Islands) were as follows:

=== Director election ===
Director candidate	Vote	%
David Howe (X)	1,225	53.31
Ken Hancock	1,073	46.69

== Spallumcheen ==
=== Mayoral election ===
Mayoral candidate	Vote	%
Christine Fraser	679	68.86
Janice Brown (X)	307	31.14

== Squamish ==
=== Mayoral election ===
Mayoral candidate	Vote	%
Karen M. Elliott	2,273	32.65
Jeff T. Cooke	1,674	24.05
Susan L. Chapelle	1,625	23.34
Paul S. Lalli	1,368	19.65
Tess C. Linsley	21	0.30

== Summerland ==
=== Mayoral election ===
Mayoral candidate	Vote	%
Toni Boot	2,331	57.48
Janet Peake	1,724	42.52

== Surrey ==
=== Mayoral election ===
Party	Mayoral candidate	Vote	%
Safe Surrey Coalition	Doug McCallum	45,484	41.43
Surrey First	Tom Gill	28,473	25.93
Integrity Now	Bruce Hayne	27,951	25.46
Proudly Surrey	Pauline Greaves	4,450	4.05
People First Surrey	Rajesh Jayaprakash	1,701	1.55
Progressive Sustainable	Imtiaz Popat	760	0.69
Independent	John Wolanski	738	0.67
Independent	Francois Nantel	234	0.21

=== Surrey City Council election ===
Top 8 candidates elected

Party	Council candidate	Vote	%
Safe Surrey Coalition	Brenda Locke	40,497	5.37
Safe Surrey Coalition	Doug Elford	39,082	5.18
Safe Surrey Coalition	Laurie Guerra	33,955	4.50
Safe Surrey Coalition	Jack Singh Hundial	33,750	4.47
Safe Surrey Coalition	Allison Patton	33,116	4.39
Surrey First	Linda Annis	33,085	4.39
Safe Surrey Coalition	Steven Pettigrew	30,820	4.08
Safe Surrey Coalition	Mandeep Nagra	30,083	3.99
Safe Surrey Coalition	Bableen Rana	29,822	3.95
Integrity Now	Barbara Steele (X)	27,482	3.64
Surrey First	Mike Starchuk (X)	26,907	3.57
Integrity Now	Rina Gill	26,783	3.55
Surrey First	Paul Hillsdon	26,570	3.52
Integrity Now	John Gibeau	26,249	3.48
Integrity Now	Avi Dhaliwal	26,100	3.46
Surrey First	Vera LeFranc (X)	25,943	3.44
Integrity Now	Dave Woods (X)	25,835	3.42
Surrey First	Trevor Halford	24,707	3.27
Surrey First	Narima Dela Cruz	23,790	3.15
Surrey First	Upkar Tatlay	17,558	2.33
Surrey First	Raminder Thomas	16,756	2.22
People First Surrey	Maria Foster	11,882	1.57
Independent	Major Singh Rasode	11,029	1.46
GreenVote	Roslyn Cassells	8,821	1.17
Proudly Surrey	Stuart Parker	8,609	1.14
Independent	Becky Zhou	8,260	1.09
Proudly Surrey	Adam MacGillivray	7,898	1.05
People First Surrey	Yanni Yu	7,813	1.04
Independent	Kashmir Besla	6,555	0.87
Proudly Surrey	Felix Kongyuy	6,430	0.85
Independent Surrey	Saira Aujla	6,265	0.83
Independent	Forrest Smith	6,135	0.81
People First Surrey	Paul Rusan	5,561	0.74
Independent	Brian Calderwood	5,485	0.73
Independent	Neneng Galento	5,315	0.70
Independent	Tanvir Bhupal	5,200	0.69
Independent	Nicholas Loberg	5,031	0.67
Proudly Surrey	Parshotam Goel	4,704	0.62
Independent	Neera Agnihotri	4,587	0.61
Independent	Kuldip Pelia	4,507	0.60
Progressive Sustainable	Deanna Welters	4,442	0.59
Independent	Nasima Nastoh	4,095	0.54
People First Surrey	Murali Krishnan	3,930	0.52
People First Surrey	Thampy Rajan	3,097	0.41
Independent Surrey	Asad Syed	3,008	0.40
Independent Surrey	Bernie Sheppard	2,811	0.37
Independent	Afshan Kamran	2,279	0.30
Independent Surrey	Derek Zabel	1,864	0.25

== Terrace ==
=== Mayoral election ===
Mayoral candidate	Vote	%
Carol Leclerc (X)	Acclaimed	

== Trail ==
=== Mayoral election ===
Mayoral candidate	Vote	%
Lisa Pasin	1,487	65.74
Bryan DeFerro	706	31.21
Casey LeMoel	69	3.05

== Vernon ==
=== Mayoral election ===
Mayoral candidate	Vote	%
Victor I. Cumming	4,928	50.52
Darrin J. Taylor	3,608	36.99
Erik S. Olesen	990	10.15
Art W. Gourley	229	2.35

=== Vernon City Council election ===
Top 6 candidates elected

Council candidate	Vote	%
Brian Quiring (X)	4,120	8.60
Scott Anderson (X)	4,108	8.58
Dalvir Nahal (X)	3,891	8.13
Kari Gares	3,878	8.10
Akbal Mund	3,626	7.57
Kelly Fehr	3,512	7.33
Teresa Durning	3,105	6.48
Dawn Tucker	2,733	5.71
Jasmine Finlay	2,592	5.41
Kevin Lepp	2,289	4.78
Shawn Lee	2,221	4.64
Jamie Morrow	2,101	4.39
Sherrilee Franks	1,944	4.06
Gord Leighton	1,801	3.76
Rick Lavin	1,467	3.06
David Deshane	1,287	2.69
Lily Kerr	1,061	2.22
Terry Vulcano	879	1.84
Don Jefcoat	821	1.71
Sam Zaharia	448	0.94

=== Vernon City Council By-election ===
A by-election was held on 4 December 2021 to replace Dalvir Nahal who died in December.

Council candidate	Vote	%
Teresa Durning	443	27.16
Catherine Lord	429	26.30
Ed Stranks	244	14.96
Stephanie Hendy	107	6.56
Kevin Demers	103	6.32
Jamie Morrow	83	5.09
Sherrilee Franks	76	4.66
Erik Olesen	59	3.62
Flora Evans	53	3.25
Arthur Gourley	28	1.72
Andy Wylie	6	0.37

== Victoria ==
=== Mayoral election ===
Party	Mayoral candidate	Vote	%
Independent	Lisa Helps (X)	12,642	43.02
NewCouncil.ca	Stephen Hammond	8,717	29.66
Independent	Michael Geoghegan	4,335	14.75
Independent	Bruce McGuigan	2,377	8.09
Independent	Rob Duncan	527	1.79
Independent	Alexander Schmid	231	0.79
Independent	Saul Andersen	219	0.75
Independent	Krzysztif Zmuda	148	0.50
Independent	David A. Johnston	119	0.50
Independent	Rymo	71	0.40

=== Victoria City Council election ===
Top 8 candidates elected

Party	Council candidate	Vote	%
Independent	Ben Isitt (X)	14,205	7.70
Independent	Jeremy Loveday (X)	13,239	7.18
Together Victoria	Laurel Collins	12,842	6.96
Independent	Geoff Young (X)	12,184	6.61
Together Victoria	Sarah Potts	11,977	6.50
Independent	Charlayne Thornton-Joe (X)	10,678	5.79
Together Victoria	Sharmarke Dubow	10,590	5.74
Independent	Marianne Alto (X)	10,245	5.56
NewCouncil.ca	Stephen Andrew	9,098	4.93
Independent	Pam Madoff (X)	9,067	4.92
Independent	Grace Lore	8,765	4.75
NewCouncil.ca	Andrew Reeve	8,246	4.47
NewCouncil.ca	Randie Johal	7,748	4.20
NewCouncil.ca	Gary Alberts	7,503	4.07
Independent	Marg Gardiner	7,041	3.82
Independent	Anna King	5,454	2.96
Independent	Rose Henry	4,076	2.21
Independent	Jordan Reichert	3,491	1.89
Independent	Darlene Archibald	3,083	1.67
Independent	Sean Leitenberg	3,059	1.66
Independent	Edison Kahakauwila	1,956	1.06
Independent	Ted Smith	1,898	1.03
Independent	Steve Filipovic	1,595	0.87
Independent	Riga Godron	1,567	0.85
Independent	Doug Stewart	1,394	0.76
Independent	James Harasymow	1,362	0.74
Independent	Jesse Jimenez	1,028	0.56
Independent	William Tate	758	0.41
Independent	Delmar Martay	238	0.13

=== Referendum ===
Are you in favour of spending up to $250,000 for establishing a Citizens' Assembly to explore the costs, benefits and disadvantages of the amalgamation between the District of Saanich and the City of Victoria?
Choice	Votes	%
Yes	18,343	66.47
No	9,253	33.53

=== Council by-election ===
A by-election was held on December 12, 2020 to replace Collins who was elected to the House of Commons.

Party	Council candidate	Vote	%
Independent	Stephen Andrew	6,937	56.29
Together Victoria	Stefanie Hardman	3,783	30.70
Independent	Roshan Vickery	603	4.89
Independent	Sean Leitenberg	294	2.39
Independent	Bill Heflin	286	2.32
Independent	Rob Duncan	158	1.28
Independent	Hailey McLeod	158	1.28
Independent	Alexander Schmid	53	0.43
Independent	Riga Godron	22	0.18
Independent	Keith Rosenberg	16	0.13
Independent	Jason Heit	13	0.11

== View Royal ==
=== Mayoral election ===
Mayoral candidate	Vote	%
David Screech (X)	Acclaimed	

== West Kelowna ==
=== Mayoral election ===
Mayoral candidate	Vote	%
Gord Milsom	6,050	82.80
Mary Mandarino	1,257	17.20

== West Vancouver ==
=== Mayoral election ===
Mayoral candidate	Vote	%
Mary-Anne Booth	4,394	37.40
Mark Sager	4,373	37.22
Christine Cassidy	2,609	22.20
Rosa Jafari	234	1.99
Nolan Strong	140	1.19

=== West Vancouver District Council election ===
Top 6 candidates elected

Council candidate	Vote	%
Marcus Wong	6,229	11.49
Peter Lambur (X)	5,558	10.25
Craig Cameron (X)	5,384	9.93
Nora Gambioli (X)	5,359	9.88
Bill Soprovich (X)	4,950	9.13
Sharon Thompson	4,942	9.11
Jim Finkbeiner	4,922	9.08
Gabrielle Loren	4,349	8.02
Andy Krawczyk	3,744	6.90
Heather Mersey	3,139	5.79
David Jones	2,128	18.01
Kate Manvell	1,826	15.45
Carolanne Reynolds	1,696	14.35

== Whistler, British Columbia ==
=== Mayoral election ===
Party	Mayoral candidates	Vote	%
Independent	Jack Crompton	Acclaimed	

== White Rock ==
=== Mayoral election ===
Party	Mayoral candidate	Vote	%
Democracy Direct - White Rock	Darryl A. Walker	1,883	30.19
Independent	Mike L. Pearce	1,722	27.61
White Rock Coalition	Grant R. Meyer	1,319	21.15
Independent	Judy E. Higginbotham	813	13.04
Independent	Tom J. Bryant	279	4.47
Independent	Garry D. Wolgemuth	221	3.54

== Williams Lake ==
=== Mayoral election ===
Mayoral candidate	Vote	%
Walt Cobb (X)	1,843	61.03
Surinderpal Rathor	1,177	38.97
