= Burnaby Green Party =

Municipal political party in Canada

- Headquarters: Burnaby, British Columbia
- Ideology: Green politics
- Political position: Centre-left
- Seats on the City Council: 0 / 9

Website
- www.burnabygreenparty.com

The Burnaby Green Party is a municipal political party in Burnaby, British Columbia. It was founded as the Burnaby Municipal Green Party in 2011 by Rick McGowan.

In 2011, the party nominated five candidates for the municipal elections,.

The party ran a slate of 8 candidates in the municipal election on October 20, 2018 with 6 candidates for City Council and 2 for School Trustee.

In October 2018, party candidate Joe Keithley was elected to city council and Christine Cunningham was elected as a trustee to the Burnaby school board. On December 15th, 2025, Keithley announced he had defected from the Green Party and joined the Burnaby Citizens Association.

In the 2026 municipal election, the Burnaby Green Party will be running 4 City Council candidates and 2 School Trustee candidates.

== Election results ==
Election	Mayoral election				City council election		
Election	Candidate	Votes	%	Result	Candidates	Elected (Note: Number of seats includes the party's mayoral candidate if they were also elected.)	Status (Note: Unlike the House of Commons of Canada or the Legislative assemblies of Canadian provinces and territories, municipal political caucuses in Burnaby are not officically recognized. The label of majority government, minority government, or opposition is a de-facto distinction, and is not legally recognized.)
2011	Did not contest				5	0 / 9	No seats
2014	Did not contest						
2018	Did not contest (endorsed Mike Hurley)				6	1 / 9	Opposition
2022	not held (Mike Hurley acclaimed)				4	1 / 9	Opposition
2022	not held (Mike Hurley acclaimed)				4	1 / 9	No seats (Note: Joe Keithley left the Green Party to sit with the Burnaby Citizens Association in 2025.)
