= List of mayors of Langley, British Columbia (district municipality) =

The Mayor of the Township of Langley is the official head and chief executive officer of Langley Township, British Columbia. Since 1967, the mayor has been elected for a three-year term; previously, township reeves were elected for one-year terms. The 11th and current mayor is Eric Woodward.

#	Term start	Term end	Mayor
1	1967	1971	David William "Bill" Poppy Jr.
2	1972	1976	George Preston
3	1976	1979	George Driediger
4	1981	1982	W.C. "Bill" Blair
5	1982	1986	Elford Nundal
6	1987	1993	John Beales
7	1993	1999	John Scholtens
8	1999	2008	Kurt Alberts
9	2008	2011	Rick Green
10	2011	2022	Jack Froese
11	2022	2026	Eric Woodward
12	2026		Jay Lundgren
