= Henry Braun (politician) =

Canadian politician and businessman

Mayor of Abbotsford, British Columbia
- In office December 1, 2014 – November 7, 2022
- Preceded by: Bruce Banman
- Succeeded by: Ross Siemens

Abbotsford City Councillor
- In office 2011–2014

Personal details
- Party: Independent
- Spouse: Velma Braun
- Occupation: businessman

Henry Braun (born c. 1950) is a Canadian politician and businessman. He served as the mayor of Abbotsford, British Columbia from 2014 to 2022.

Braun was born in Paraguay where he lived with his family until he was three and a half, when they first moved to Steinbach, Manitoba and then to Abbotsford. His parents were Russian Mennonite refugees from the Mennonite colonies of southern Ukraine who fled to Paraguay during World War II. Before entering politics, Braun was a rancher and the CEO Pacific Northern Rail Contractors Corp.

Braun was first elected as a city councillor in Abbotsford in the 2011 municipal election. As a councillor, Braun was known for his lone opposing votes, with mayor Bruce Banman calling him "(not) a team player". He ran for mayor in 2014, defeating Banman by just over 600 votes. Braun ran on a platform of "fiscal responsibility" and "better accountability" in local government. He received some controversy in his run, as his son was director of development planning for the city, causing a possible conflict of interest. In his campaign, he won the endorsements of former mayors George Ferguson and Dave Kandal.

Braun was re-elected mayor in the 2018 mayoral election, defeating long-time city councillor Moe Gill and accountant Eric Nyvall, taking 57% of the vote.

As mayor, Braun's biggest challenge was having to deal with the 2021 Pacific Northwest floods which ravaged the Sumas Prairie in the city.

Braun did not run for re-election in 2022.

In 2024, he was selected by the provincial Ministry of Municipal Affairs to advise Kamloops City Council on how to "work together" during its dispute with mayor Reid Hamer-Jackson. Braun produced a "scathing report" which resulted in council voting to ask Hamer-Jackson to resign.

== Personal life ==
Braun is married to Velma Braun, and has three children.
