= Burnaby-New Westminster =

Burnaby-New Westminster may refer to:

- Burnaby—New Westminster (federal electoral district) (2004 to 2015)
- Burnaby-New Westminster (provincial electoral district) (since 2024)
