= Burnaby City Council =

Municipal council in British Columbia, Canada

Type
- Type: City council

Leadership
- Mayor: Mike Hurley, independent

Structure
- Seats: Mayor and 8 councillors
- Political groups: Burnaby Citizens Association (7) New Burnaby Party (1) Independent (1)

Elections
- Last election: 17 October 2026
- Next election: TBD

Meeting place
- Burnaby City Hall; Burnaby, British Columbia

Website
- burnaby.ca/our-city/mayor-and-council

Burnaby City Council is the governing body for the city of Burnaby, British Columbia, Canada.

The council consists of the mayor and eight elected city councillors representing the city as a whole. Municipal elections also select seven school trustees.

Municipal elections are held every four years across the province on the third Saturday of October or the third Saturday of November.

== Burnaby City Council members ==
=== 2026–present ===
Elected in the 2026 municipal election

Council membership

Name	Party	Position
Mike Hurley	Independent	Mayor
Ryan Erwin	Burnaby Citizens Association	Councillor
Joe Keithley	Burnaby Citizens Association	Councillor
Cindy Lee	Burnaby Citizens Association	Councillor
Richard T. Lee	New Burnaby Party	Councillor
Maita Santiago	Burnaby Citizens Association	Councillor
Kiran Singh	Burnaby Citizens Association	Councillor
Daniel Tetrault	Burnaby Citizens Association	Councillor
James Wang	Burnaby Citizens Association	Councillor

=== 2022–2026 ===
Elected in the 2022 municipal election

Council membership

Name	Party	Position
Mike Hurley	Independent	Mayor
Pietro Calendino	Burnaby Citizens Association	Councillor
Sav Dhaliwal	Burnaby Citizens Association	Councillor
Alison Gu	Burnaby Citizens Association	Councillor
Joe Keithley	Burnaby Green Party (2022–2025)	Councillor
Joe Keithley	Burnaby Citizens Association (2025–2026)	Councillor
Richard T. Lee	One Burnaby	Councillor
Maita Santiago	Burnaby Citizens Association	Councillor
Daniel Tetrault	Burnaby Citizens Association	Councillor
James Wang	Burnaby Citizens Association	Councillor

=== 2018–2022 ===
Elected in the 2018 municipal election and 2021 by-election

Council membership as of June 26, 2021:

Name	Party	Position
Mike Hurley	Independent	Mayor
Dan Johnston	Independent (Note: Dan Johnston was elected as part of the Burnaby Citizens Association but left the party to sit as an independent on February 5, 2020.)	Councillor
Pietro Calendino	Burnaby Citizens Association	Councillor
Sav Dhaliwal	Burnaby Citizens Association	Councillor
Alison Gu (elected June 26, 2021)	Burnaby Citizens Association	Councillor
Mike Hillman (elected June 26, 2021)	One Burnaby (Note: Mike Hillman was elected in a by-election as an independent but started One Burnaby in 2022.)	Councillor
Colleen Jordan	Independent (Note: Colleen Jordan was elected as part of the Burnaby Citizens Association but left the party to sit as an independent on February 5, 2020.)	Councillor
James Wang	Burnaby Citizens Association	Councillor
Paul McDonnell (until July 12, 2020) (Note: Seat was occupied by Councillor Paul McDonnell until he died on July 12, 2020.)	Independent (Note: Paul McDonnell was elected as part of the Burnaby Citizens Association but left the party to sit as an independent on February 5, 2020.)	Councillor
Nick Volkow (until June 21, 2020) (Note: Seat was occupied by Councillor Nick Volkow until he died after a lengthy battle with brain cancer on June 21, 2020.)	Burnaby Citizens Association	Councillor
Joe Keithley	Burnaby Green Party	Councillor

=== 2014–2018 ===
Elected in the 2014 municipal election

Name	Party	Position
Derek Corrigan	Burnaby Citizens Association	Mayor
Pietro Calendino	Burnaby Citizens Association	Councillor
Sav Dhaliwal	Burnaby Citizens Association	Councillor
Dan Johnston	Burnaby Citizens Association	Councillor
Collen Jordan	Burnaby Citizens Association	Councillor
Anne Kang	Burnaby Citizens Association	Councillor
Paul McDonnell	Burnaby Citizens Association	Councillor
Nick Volkow	Burnaby Citizens Association	Councillor
James Wang	Burnaby Citizens Association	Councillor

=== 2011–2014 ===
Elected in the 2011 municipal election

Name	Party	Position
Derek Corrigan	Burnaby Citizens Association	Mayor
Pietro Calendino	Burnaby Citizens Association	Councillor
Richard Chang	Burnaby Citizens Association	Councillor
Sav Dhaliwal	Burnaby Citizens Association	Councillor
Dan Johnston	Burnaby Citizens Association	Councillor
Collen Jordan	Burnaby Citizens Association	Councillor
Anne Kang	Burnaby Citizens Association	Councillor
Paul McDonell	Burnaby Citizens Association	Councillor
Nick Volkow	Burnaby Citizens Association	Councillor

=== 2008–2011 ===
Elected in the 2008 municipal election

Name	Party	Position
Derek Corrigan	Burnaby Citizens Association	Mayor
Pietro Calendino	Burnaby Citizens Association	Councillor
Richard Chang	Burnaby Citizens Association	Councillor
Sav Dhaliwal	Burnaby Citizens Association	Councillor
Dan Johnston	Burnaby Citizens Association	Councillor
Collen Jordan	Burnaby Citizens Association	Councillor
Anne Kang	Burnaby Citizens Association	Councillor
Paul McDonell	Burnaby Citizens Association	Councillor
Nick Volkow	Burnaby Citizens Association	Councillor

=== 2005–2008 ===
Elected in the 2005 municipal election

Name	Party	Position
Derek Corrigan	Burnaby Citizens Association	Mayor
Pietro Calendino	Burnaby Citizens Association	Councillor
Gary Begin	Team Burnaby	Councillor
Garth Evans	Team Burnaby	Councillor
Dan Johnston	Burnaby Citizens Association	Councillor
Collen Jordan	Burnaby Citizens Association	Councillor
Lee Rankin	Team Burnaby	Councillor
Barbara Spitz	Team Burnaby	Councillor
Nick Volkow	Burnaby Citizens Association	Councillor

=== 2002–2005 ===
Elected in the 2002 municipal election

Name	Party	Position
Derek Corrigan	Burnaby Citizens Association	Mayor
Pietro Calendino	Burnaby Citizens Association	Councillor
Sav Dhaliwal	Burnaby Citizens Association	Councillor
Doug Evans	Burnaby Citizens Association	Councillor
Dan Johnston	Burnaby Citizens Association	Councillor
Collen Jordan	Burnaby Citizens Association	Councillor
Lee Rankin	Team Burnaby	Councillor
Celeste Redman	Burnaby Citizens Association	Councillor
Nick Volkow	Burnaby Citizens Association	Councillor

=== 1999–2002 ===
Elected in the 1999 municipal election

Name	Party	Position
Douglas Drummond	Burnaby Citizens Association	Mayor
Gary Begin	Burnaby Voters Non-Partisan Association	Councillor
Derek Corrigan	Burnaby Citizens Association	Councillor
Barbara Der	Burnaby Voters Non-Partisan Association	Councillor
Doug Evans	Burnaby Citizens Association	Councillor
Nancy Harris	Burnaby Voters Non-Partisan Association	Councillor
Dan Johnston	Burnaby Citizens Association	Councillor
Celeste Redman	Burnaby Citizens Association	Councillor
Nick Volkow	Burnaby Citizens Association	Councillor

=== 1996–1999 ===
Elected in the 1996 municipal election

Name	Party	Position
Douglas Drummond	Burnaby Citizens Association	Mayor
Derek Corrigan	Burnaby Citizens Association	Councillor
Jim Young	Burnaby Citizens Association	Councillor
Doug Evans	Burnaby Citizens Association	Councillor
Dan Johnston	Burnaby Citizens Association	Councillor
Doreen Lawson	Burnaby Voters Association	Councillor
Lee Rankin	Burnaby Citizens Association	Councillor
Celeste Redman	Burnaby Citizens Association	Councillor
Nick Volkow	Burnaby Citizens Association	Councillor

=== 1993–1996 ===
Elected in the 1993 municipal election

Name	Party	Position
Bill Copeland	Burnaby Citizens Association	Mayor
Derek Corrigan	Burnaby Citizens Association	Councillor
Jim Young	Burnaby Citizens Association	Councillor
Doug Evans	Burnaby Citizens Association	Councillor
Douglas Drummond	Burnaby Citizens Association	Councillor
Doreen Lawson	Burnaby Voters Association	Councillor
Lee Rankin	Burnaby Citizens Association	Councillor
Celeste Redman	Burnaby Citizens Association	Councillor
Dan Johnston	Burnaby Citizens Association	Councillor

=== 1990–1993 ===
Elected in the 1990 municipal election

Name	Party	Position
Bill Copeland	Burnaby Citizens Association	Mayor
Derek Corrigan	Burnaby Citizens Association	Councillor
Jim Young	Burnaby Citizens Association	Councillor
Doug Evans	Burnaby Citizens Association	Councillor
Douglas Drummond	Burnaby Citizens Association	Councillor
Doreen Lawson	Burnaby Voters Association	Councillor
Lee Rankin	Burnaby Citizens Association	Councillor
Celeste Redman	Burnaby Citizens Association	Councillor
Egon Nikolai	Burnaby Voters Association	Councillor

=== 1987–1990 ===
Elected in the 1987 municipal election

Name	Party	Position
Bill Copeland	Burnaby Citizens Association	Mayor
Gary Begin	Burnaby Voters Association	Councillor
Derek Corrigan	Burnaby Citizens Association	Councillor
Douglas Drummond	Burnaby Citizens Association	Councillor
Egon Nikolai	Burnaby Voters Association	Councillor
Fred Randall	Burnaby Citizens Association	Councillor
Lee Rankin	Burnaby Citizens Association	Councillor
Joan Sawicki	Burnaby Citizens Association	Councillor
Jim Young	Burnaby Citizens Association	Councillor

=== 1985–1987 ===
Elected in the 1985 municipal election

Name	Party	Position
William Lewarne	Burnaby Voters Association	Mayor
Gary Begin	Burnaby Voters Association	Councillor
Douglas Drummond	Burnaby Citizens Association	Councillor
Allan Emmott	Burnaby Voters Association	Councillor
George McLean	Burnaby Voters Association	Councillor
Egon Nikolai	Burnaby Voters Association	Councillor
Lee Rankin	Burnaby Citizens Association	Councillor
Victor Stusiak	Burnaby Voters Association	Councillor
Sheila Veitch	Burnaby Voters Association	Councillor

=== 1983–1985 ===
Elected in the 1983 municipal election

Name	Party	Position
William Lewarne	Burnaby Voters Association	Mayor
Donald Brown	Burnaby Voters Association	Councillor
Douglas Drummond	Burnaby Citizens Association	Councillor
Allan Emmott	Burnaby Voters Association	Councillor
George McLean	Burnaby Voters Association	Councillor
Egon Nikolai	Burnaby Voters Association	Councillor
Lee Rankin	Burnaby Citizens Association	Councillor
Victor Stusiak	Burnaby Voters Association	Councillor
Doreen Lawson	Burnaby Voters Association	Councillor

=== 1981–1983 ===
Elected in the 1981 municipal election

Name	Party	Position
William Lewarne	Burnaby Voters Association	Mayor
Donald Brown	Burnaby Voters Association	Councillor
Tom Constable	Independent	Councillor
Douglas Drummond	Burnaby Citizens Association	Councillor
Allan Emmott	Burnaby Voters Association	Councillor
Doreen Lawson	Burnaby Voters Association	Councillor
George McLean	Burnaby Voters Association	Councillor
Egon Nikolai	Burnaby Voters Association	Councillor
Victor Stusiak	Burnaby Voters Association	Councillor

=== 1979–1981 ===
Elected in the 1979 municipal election

Name	Party	Position
Dave Mercier	Burnaby Voters Association	Mayor
Gerry Ast	Burnaby Citizens Association	Councillor
Donald Brown	Burnaby Voters Association	Councillor
Douglas Drummond	Burnaby Citizens Association	Councillor
Allan Emmott	Burnaby Voters Association	Councillor
Doreen Lawson	Burnaby Voters Association	Councillor
William Lewarne	Burnaby Voters Association	Councillor
Fred Randall	Burnaby Citizens Association	Councillor
Victor Stusiak	Burnaby Voters Association	Councillor

=== 1977–1979 ===
Elected in the 1977 municipal election

Name	Party	Position
Tom Constable	Burnaby Citizens Association	Mayor
Gerry Ast	Burnaby Citizens Association	Councillor
Douglas Drummond	Burnaby Citizens Association	Councillor
Allan Emmott	Burnaby Voters Association	Councillor
Brian Gunn	Burnaby Citizens Association	Councillor
Doreen Lawson	Burnaby Voters Association	Councillor
William Lewarne	Burnaby Voters Association	Councillor
Dave Mercier	Burnaby Voters Association	Councillor
Fred Randall	Burnaby Citizens Association	Councillor
