= Fred Randall =

Canadian politician

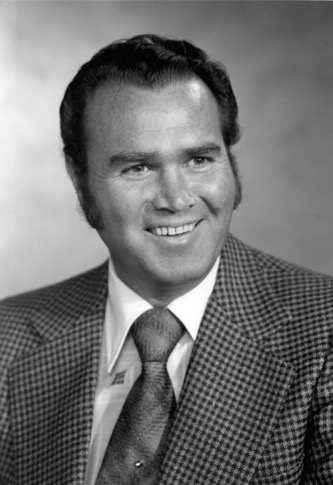

Member of the Legislative Assembly for Burnaby-Edmonds
- In office 1991–2001
- Preceded by: David Mercier
- Succeeded by: Patty Sahota

Personal details
- Born: January 25, 1931 Vancouver, British Columbia, Canada
- Died: July 5, 2002 (aged 71) Burnaby, British Columbia
- Party: New Democratic Party
- Other political affiliations: Burnaby Citizens Association
- Profession: construction worker, trade union official and politician

Fred G. Randall (January 25, 1931 – July 5, 2002) was a construction worker, trade union official and political figure in British Columbia, Canada. He represented Burnaby-Edmonds in the Legislative Assembly of British Columbia from 1991 to 2001 as a New Democratic Party (NDP) member.

He was born in Vancouver, British Columbia. Randall was business representative and then chief executive officer for the International Union of Operating Engineers, Local 115. He was a city councillor for Burnaby City Council. Randall served on the board of governors for the British Columbia Institute of Technology. During his time in the provincial assembly, he was parliamentary secretary to several provincial cabinet ministers. Randall did not run for reelection in 2001. He died the following year of leukaemia. The aquatic hall at the Edmonds Community Centre in Burnaby has been named in his honour and is called Fred Randall Pool.
