= Bruce Banman =

Canadian politician

The Honourable Bruce Banman MLA
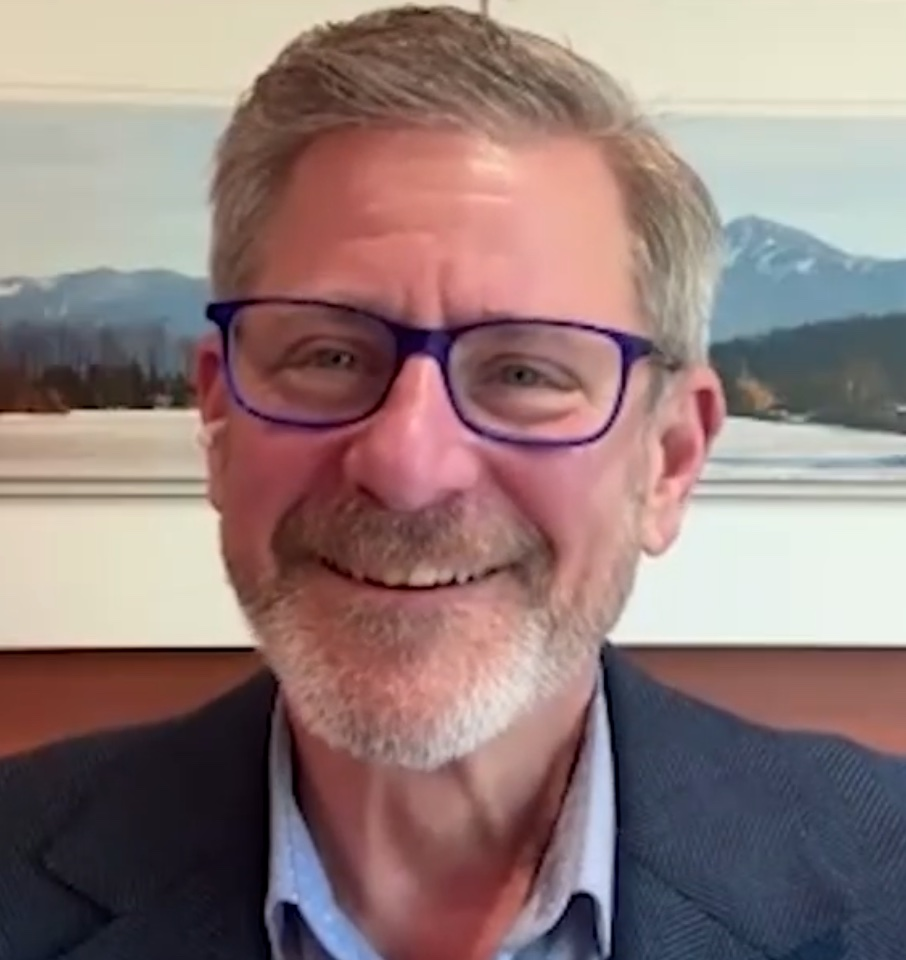
- Banman in 2026

Minister of Citizens' Services and Technology of British Columbia
- Incumbent
- Assumed office November 20, 2026
- Premier: Lorne Doerkson
- Preceded by: Diana Gibson

Member of the British Columbia Legislative Assembly for Abbotsford South
- Incumbent
- Assumed office October 24, 2020
- Preceded by: Darryl Plecas

Abbotsford City Councillor
- In office 2018–2021

Mayor of Abbotsford
- In office 2011–2014
- Preceded by: George Peary
- Succeeded by: Henry Braun

Personal details
- Born: Richard Bruce Banman
- Party: BC Conservative (2023–2026, 2026–present)
- Other political affiliations: BC United (2020–2023); Independent (2026); CentreBC (2026)
- Occupation: Politician, Chiropractor

Richard Bruce Banman MLA is a Canadian politician who has served as a member of the Legislative Assembly of British Columbia (MLA) representing the electoral district of Abbotsford South since 2020. Initially elected as a member of the BC Liberal Party (later BC United), Banman crossed the floor in 2023 to join the Conservative Party. In 2026 he briefly left the party following the election of Kerry-Lynne Findlay as leader, calling her "unelectable," choosing to sit as an independent and member of CentreBC, before rejoining the party following the resignation of Findlay.

Prior to provincial politics, he served as the mayor of Abbotsford from 2011 to 2014, and an Abbotsford city councillor from 2018 to 2021.

== Early life and career ==
Raised in Chilliwack, Banman moved to Abbotsford in the early 1980s. He attended Fraser Valley College before transferring to the Western States Chiropractic College in Portland, Oregon. He graduated in 1997, then worked as a chiropractor and small business owner in Abbotsford. He is married with two children.

== Political career ==
=== Abbotsford municipal politics ===
Banman was elected mayor of Abbotsford in 2011, defeating incumbent mayor George Peary. He ran for re-election in 2014 but was defeated by Henry Braun by fewer than 600 votes. He returned to municipal politics in 2018 by winning a seat on the Abbotsford City Council, receiving the second-highest number of votes among the candidates. Throughout his career, he has advocated for agricultural sustainability and the protection of farming heritage.

=== BC Liberals ===
Banman announced in May 2019 his intention to seek the BC Liberal nomination for the riding of Abbotsford South in the next provincial election; he defeated two others to secure the nomination in February 2020. He was subsequently elected in the October 2020 general election, defeating Inder Johal of the New Democratic Party by over 2,000 votes, and resigned as councillor in February 2021. He served in the shadow cabinet as critic for emergency management, climate readiness and citizens' services.

=== Conservative Party of BC ===
On September 13, 2023, Banman crossed the floor to join the Conservative Party, becoming the party's second MLA in the legislature; he justified his move as allowing him to better represent his constituents. His crossing gave the Conservatives official party status in the legislature, and he was named the caucus house leader.

He was re-elected as a Conservative in the 2024 provincial election, garnering 62% of the vote and was named party whip by Conservative leader John Rustad that November.

In February, he announced his campaign for the 2026 Conservative Party of British Columbia leadership election. However, he withdrew in March.

On August 27, 2026, he left the Conservative caucus to sit as an independent.

=== CentreBC ===
In September 2026, Banman joined fellow Conservative defectors Ian Paton, Peter Milobar, Áʼa꞉líya Warbus, and Rosalyn Bird in forming a new party. After Milobar became leader of CentreBC, Banman joined Milobar and six other MLAs in joining the party. However, following the resignation of Kerry-Lynne Findlay, all defectors rejoined the conservatives caucus.

== Electoral history ==
2026 British Columbia general election: Abbotsford South
Party	Candidate	Votes	%	±%	Expenditures
Conservative	Bruce Banman	11,717	63.29	+1.68	
New Democratic	Leah Ballantyne	5,588	30.19	–4.99	
OneBC	Robin Roy	1,207	6.52	–	
Total valid votes		18,512	99.62	–	
Total rejected ballots		70	0.38	+0.13	
Turnout		18,582	44.49	–7.23	
Registered voters		41,766			
Conservative hold		Swing		+3.34	
Source: Elections BC

2024 British Columbia general election: Abbotsford South
Party	Candidate	Votes	%	±%	Expenditures
Conservative	Bruce Banman	13,053	61.61	+59.2	$38,201.55
New Democratic	Sarah Kooner	7,454	35.18	+1.0	$11,353.64
Independent	Amandeep Singh	681	3.21	–	$1,680.00
Total valid votes/expense limit		21,188	99.75	–	$71,700.08
Total rejected ballots		54	0.25	–	
Turnout		21,242	51.72	–	
Registered voters		41,068			
Conservative notional gain from BC United		Swing		N/A (Note: Swing cannot be calculated as BC United did not run a candidate in this riding.)	
Source: Elections BC

2020 British Columbia general election: Abbotsford South
Party	Candidate	Votes	%	±%	Expenditures
Liberal	Bruce Banman	9,730	44.69	−7.79	$44,289.90
New Democratic	Inder Johal	7,706	35.39	+7.30	$729.55
Green	Arid Flavelle	2,617	12.02	−2.98	$1,251.04
Christian Heritage	Laura-Lynn Thompson	1,720	7.90	+3.67	$0.00
Total valid votes		21,773	100.00	–	
Total rejected ballots		210	0.96	+0.18	
Turnout		21,983	48.46	−6.25	
Registered voters		45,365			
Liberal gain from Independent		Swing		−7.55	
Source: Elections BC
