= David Mercier =

Canadian politician (1939–2021)

Dave Mercier

Leader of the Conservative Party of British Columbia
- In office March 1997 – January 2001
- Preceded by: Peter B. Macdonald
- Succeeded by: Susan Power

Member of the British Columbia Legislative Assembly for Burnaby-Edmonds
- In office October 22, 1986 – October 17, 1991
- Preceded by: Rosemary Brown
- Succeeded by: Fred G. Randall

Mayor of Burnaby
- In office 1979–1981
- Preceded by: Tom Constable
- Succeeded by: William Lewarne

Burnaby City Councillor
- In office 1977–1979

Personal details
- Born: David Maurice Mercier; July 20, 1939 Vancouver, British Columbia, Canada
- Died: April 12, 2021 (aged 81)
- Party: BC Conservative
- Other political affiliations: BC Liberal; Social Credit

David Maurice Mercier (July 20, 1939 – April 12, 2021) was a Canadian politician who served as a leader of the Conservative Party of British Columbia from 1997 to 2001. He served as a member of the Legislative Assembly (MLA) representing the electoral district of Burnaby-Edmonds from 1986 to 1991 as a member of the Social Credit Party. Prior to provincial politics, he served as mayor of Burnaby from 1979 to 1981.

== Political career ==
Mercier was a chartered accountant and served as mayor of Burnaby, British Columbia from 1979 to 1981. He previously ran unsuccessfully in Burnaby-Edmonds in the 1966 general election as a BC Liberal candidate and in Burnaby-Willingdon in the 1972 general election as a Social Credit candidate.

Mercier was elected to the Legislative Assembly in the 1986 general election as a Social Credit candidate for Burnaby-Edmonds. In 1989, he and three colleagues — Graham Bruce, Duane Delton Crandall, and Doug Mowat — quit the governing Social Credit caucus on October 3 to sit as "Independent Social Credit" members. In a joint statement, the four stressed that they "in no way desire[d] the fall of our government", but wished to spur an "open and realistic assessment" of Bill Vander Zalm's continued leadership. Mercier returned to the Social Credit caucus on February 14, 1990, alongside Bruce and Mowat, while Crandall had already rejoined the caucus in January. Mercier explained that his concerns about Vander Zalm's leadership and re-election chances had been addressed.

In 1991, Mercier served for several months as British Columbia's Minister of Environment. He did not seek re-election in the 1996 general election.

Mercier served as leader of the Conservative Party of British Columbia from 1997 to 2001.

== Personal life ==
Mercier died in 2021 from complications of Parkinson's disease.
