= Raj Chouhan =

Canadian politician

The Honourable Raj Chouhan MLA
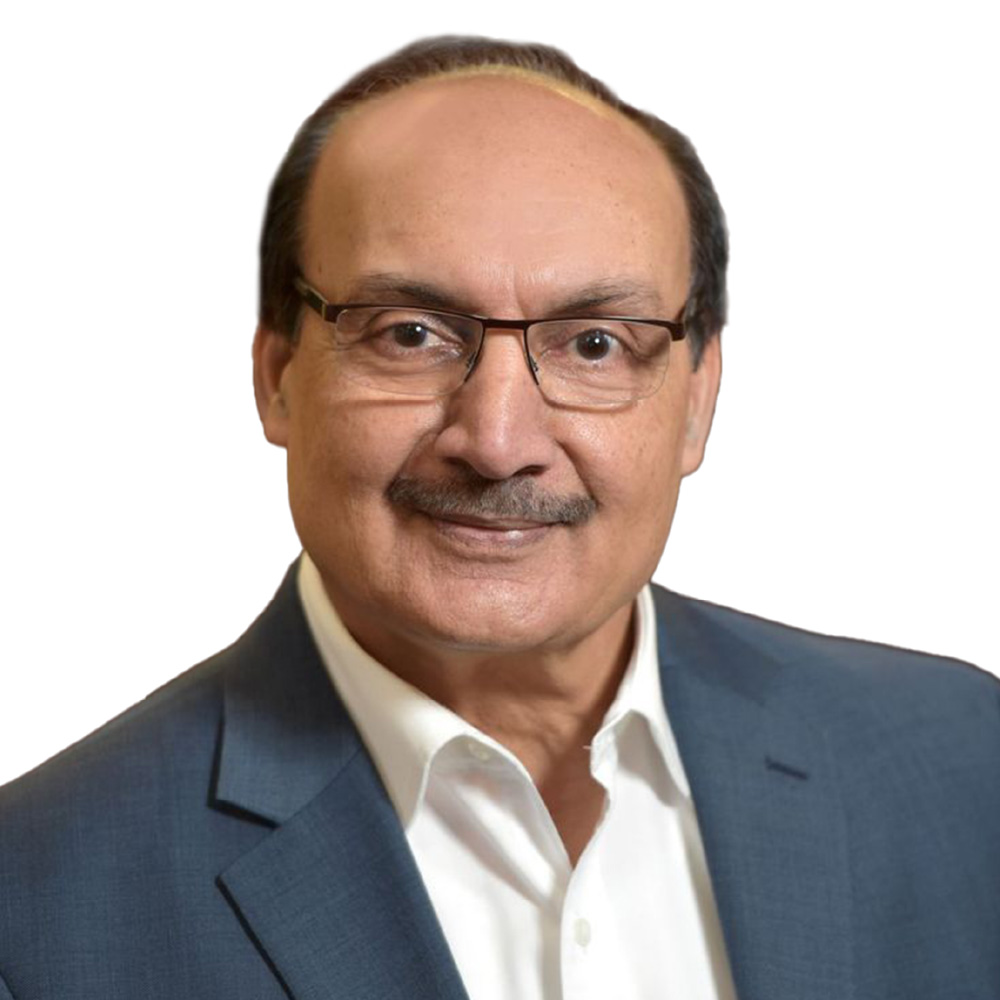
- Campaign portrait, 2024

40th Speaker of the Legislative Assembly of British Columbia
- In office December 7, 2020 – September 22, 2026
- Preceded by: Darryl Plecas
- Succeeded by: Teresa Wat

Member of the British Columbia Legislative Assembly for Burnaby-New Westminster Burnaby-Edmonds (2005–2024)
- Incumbent
- Assumed office May 17, 2005
- Preceded by: Patty Sahota

Personal details
- Born: Punjab, India
- Party: New Democratic
- Occupation: Politician, union leader

Raj Chouhan MLA is a Canadian politician and trade unionist who has served as the 40th speaker of the Legislative Assembly of British Columbia from 2020 until 2026. A member of the Legislative Assembly (MLA) he has represented the electoral district of Burnaby-New Westminster (formerly Burnaby-Edmonds) since 2005. He is a member of the New Democratic Party.

Chouhan previously served as the assistant deputy speaker of the Legislative Assembly from 2013 to 2017 and as the deputy speaker from 2017 to 2020. While in opposition, he served as the critic for Mental Health; Human Rights, Immigration and Multiculturism; and Labour. He was re-elected in 2009, 2013, 2017 and 2020.

== Early life and career ==
Born in the state of Punjab in India, Chouhan was the founding president of the Canadian Farmworkers Union and served as a director of the Hospital Employees' Union. He also served as a member of the Labour Relations Board of B.C. and the Arbitration Bureau of B.C.

A founding member of the BC Organization to Fight Racism, Chouhan has worked to promote human rights and racial equality. He has served as the vice president of BC Human Rights Defenders since 2003, and has taught courses on Human Rights, the BC Labour Code and collective bargaining since 1987.

== Electoral history ==
2026 British Columbia general election: Burnaby-New Westminster
** Preliminary results — Not yet official **
| Party | Candidate | Votes | % | ±% |
|---|---|---|---|---|
| New Democratic | Raj Chouhan | 8,417 | 53.58 | |
| Conservative | Joe Latam | 6,713 | 42.72 | |
| Green | Greg DePaco (Note: Green Party nominee Greg DePaco withdrew from the race, but his name remained on the ballot as ballot printing had already begun at the time of his withdrawal. Election officials informed voters at voting places that DePaco withdrew as a candidate.) | — | — | — |
| Total valid votes | | 15,130 | 96.30 | |
| Total rejected ballots | | 581 | 3.70 | +3.20 |
| Turnout | | 15,710 | | |
| Registered voters | | | | |
| New Democratic hold | | Swing | | −6.98 |
Source: Elections BC

2024 British Columbia general election: Burnaby-New Westminster
| Party | Candidate | Votes | % | ±% | Expenditures |
|---|---|---|---|---|---|
| New Democratic | Raj Chouhan | 10,647 | 59.99 | -3.4 | $48,886.34 |
| Conservative | Deepak Suri | 6,161 | 34.71 | +33.3 | $15,841.58 |
| Independent | Daniel Kofi Ampong | 940 | 5.30 | – | $0.00 |
| Total valid votes/expense limit | | 17,748 | 99.50 | – | $71,700.08 |
| Total rejected ballots | | 89 | 0.50 | – | |
| Turnout | | 17,837 | 51.26 | – | |
| Registered voters | | 34,794 | | | |
| New Democratic notional hold | | Swing | | -18.4 | |
Source: Elections BC

2020 British Columbia general election: Burnaby-Edmonds
| Party | Candidate | Votes | % | ±% | Expenditures |
|---|---|---|---|---|---|
| New Democratic | Raj Chouhan | 11,063 | 62.01 | +7.76 | $38,987.91 |
| Liberal | Tripat Atwal | 4,754 | 26.65 | −5.43 | $62,427.04 |
| Green | Iqbal Parekh | 2,023 | 11.34 | −2.33 | $889.57 |
| Total valid votes | | 17,840 | 100.00 | – | |
| Total rejected ballots | | 196 | 1.10 | | |
| Turnout | | 18036 | 44.36 | | |
| Registered voters | | 40655 | | | |
Source: Elections BC

2017 British Columbia general election: Burnaby-Edmonds
| Party | Candidate | Votes | % | ±% | Expenditures |
|---|---|---|---|---|---|
| New Democratic | Raj Chouhan | 10,827 | 54.25 | +2.82 | $47,595.75 |
| Liberal | Garrison Duke | 6,404 | 32.08 | −6.55 | $42,998.98 |
| Green | Valentine Wu | 2,728 | 13.67 | +4.93 | $2,758.14 |
| Total valid votes | | 19,959 | 100.00 | – | |
| Total rejected ballots | | 156 | 0.78 | −0.34 | |
| Turnout | | 20,115 | 53.81 | +4.81 | |
| Registered voters | | 37,385 | | | |
Source: Elections BC

2013 British Columbia general election: Burnaby-Edmonds
| Party | Candidate | Votes | % | ±% | Expenditures |
|---|---|---|---|---|---|
| New Democratic | Raj Chouhan | 9,253 | 51.43 | -0.51 | $79,346 |
| Liberal | Jeff Kuah | 6,950 | 38.63 | +0.27 | $20,696 |
| Green | Wyatt Tessari | 1,573 | 8.74 | +2.00 | $600 |
| Excalibur | Nicholas Edward D'Amico | 215 | 1.20 | – | $341 |
| Total valid votes | | 17,991 | 100.00 | | |
| Total rejected ballots | | 203 | 1.12 | | |
| Turnout | | 18,194 | 49.00 | | |
Source: Elections BC

2009 British Columbia general election: Burnaby-Edmonds
| Party | Candidate | Votes | % | ±% | Expenditures |
|---|---|---|---|---|---|
| New Democratic | Raj Chouhan | 8,647 | 51.94 | +20.52 | $75,002 |
| Liberal | Lee Rankin | 6,385 | 38.36 | -7.71 | $80,469 |
| Green | Carrie McLaren | 1,122 | 6.74 | -3.17 | $383 |
| Libertarian | Dan Cancade | 493 | 2.96 | +2.96 | $643 |
| Total valid votes | | 16,647 | | | |
| Total rejected ballots | | 178 | 1.06 | | |
| Turnout | | 16,825 | 49.07 | | |
| New Democratic hold | | Swing | | +14.12 | |

2005 British Columbia general election: Burnaby-Edmonds
| Party | Candidate | Votes | % | ±% | Expenditures |
|---|---|---|---|---|---|
| New Democratic | Raj Chouhan | 10,337 | 46.71 | +5.23 | $71,644 |
| Liberal | Patty Sahota | 9,599 | 43.38 | -5.02 | $109,119 |
| Green | Suzanne Deveau | 2,192 | 9.91 | – | $1,754 |
| Total valid votes | | 22,128 | | | |
| Total rejected ballots | | 155 | 0.70% | | |
| Turnout | | 22,283 | 57.70% | | |
| New Democratic gain from Liberal | | Swing | | +5.13 | |
