= Patty Sahota =

Canadian politician (1969–2024)

Member of the British Columbia Legislative Assembly for Burnaby-Edmonds
- In office May 16, 2001 – May 17, 2005
- Preceded by: Fred Randall
- Succeeded by: Raj Chouhan

Minister of State for Resort Development of British Columbia
- In office February 1, 2005 – June 16, 2005
- Premier: Gordon Campbell
- Preceded by: Sandy Santori

Personal details
- Born: October 26, 1969 Jagpalpur, Punjab, India
- Died: February 12, 2024 (aged 54) Merritt, British Columbia, Canada
- Party: BC Liberal

Patty Sahota (October 26, 1969 – February 12, 2024) was a Canadian politician, who represented the electoral district of Burnaby-Edmonds in the Legislative Assembly of British Columbia from 2001 to 2005. She sat as a member of the BC Liberal Party and served for several months in 2005 as the Minister of State for Resort Development. She was born in Jagpalpur, Punjab, India and immigrated to Canada with her parents in 1979.

Sahota was defeated in her 2005 bid for re-election by Raj Chouhan of the NDP.

Sahota died suddenly and unexpectedly while visiting her parents in Merritt, British Columbia on February 12, 2024, at the age of 54.

== Electoral record ==
2005 British Columbia general election: Burnaby-Edmonds
| Party | Candidate | Votes | % | ±% | Expenditures |
|---|---|---|---|---|---|
| New Democratic | Raj Chouhan | 10,337 | 46.71 | +5.23 | $71,644 |
| Liberal | Patty Sahota | 9,599 | 43.38 | -5.02 | $109,119 |
| Green | Suzanne Deveau | 2,192 | 9.91 | – | $1,754 |
| Total valid votes | | 22,128 | | | |
| Total rejected ballots | | 155 | 0.70% | | |
| Turnout | | 22,283 | 57.70% | | |
| New Democratic gain from Liberal | | Swing | | +5.13 | |

2001 British Columbia general election: Burnaby-Edmonds
| Party | Candidate | Votes | % | Expenditures |
|---|---|---|---|---|
| Liberal | Patty Sahota | 9,607 | 51.09 | $34,249 |
| New Democratic | Sav Dhaliwal | 4,924 | 26.19 | $48,520 |
| Green | Eric Hawthorne | 2,599 | 13.82 | $2,231 |
| Unity | Grant Murray | 1,111 | 5.91 | $7,646 |
| Marijuana | Roy Arjun | 456 | 2.43 | $394 |
| Citizens | Gordon S. Watson | 105 | 0.56 | $1,150 |
| Total valid votes | | 18,802 | 100.00 | |
| Total rejected ballots | | 120 | 0.64 | |
| Turnout | | 18,922 | 69.90 | |
