= Canadian Farmworkers Union =

Trade union

The Canadian Farmworkers Union was a labour union representing farmworkers in Canada. It was active from 1978 to 1987, primarily among South Asian migrants to British Columbia and Ontario. In 1993, it pushed the New Democratic Party of British Columbia's government to extend health and safety regulations to agricultural workers.

A number of CFU leaders later became prominent politicians and activists in the province. Future Speaker of the Legislative Assembly of British Columbia Raj Chouhan was CFU's founding president and social activist Charan Gill was a founding member.
