= Charan Gill =

Canadian social activist (1936–2021)

Charan Gill OBC
- Born: Charan Pal Singh Gill; 17 June 1936; British Hong Kong
- Died: 2 February 2021 (aged 84); Langley, British Columbia, Canada
- Education: Panjab University; University of British Columbia
- Known for: Social activism and human rights advocacy

Charan Pal Singh Gill OBC (17 June 1936 – 2 February 2021) was a Canadian social activist and South-Asian community leader in British Columbia. Through his work, he focused on improving the living conditions, wages, and working conditions of farmworkers across British Columbia and Canada. He was an inductee to the Order of British Columbia in 1999, a recipient of the Queen’s Golden Jubilee Medal in 2002, and the BC Achievement Foundation Community Award in 2010 for his contributions toward community service and social justice advocacy.

== Early life ==
Gill was born into a Punjabi family in colonial Hong Kong on 17 June 1936. His family returned to India, two years after his birth in 1938. He was raised by his mother Harnam Kaur Gill, after the death of his father in 1939. He obtained a Master of Arts degree in Punjabi literature from Panjab University in 1959 and worked in Hong Kong at a bank through his 20s. He moved to Canada in 1967 at the age of 31, with his family joining him in 1969. He completed his Master's in Social Work (MSW) from the University of British Columbia in 1983.

== Career ==
Gill started his career in Canada, working in a sawmill in Williams Lake, British Columbia, until he was forced to stop due to a broken wrist. The injury and subsequent work disruption had Gill shift focus to social work focused on northern communities in British Columbia based out of Prince Rupert. He subsequently moved to Surrey in the Lower Mainland region of British Columbia and continued his social work. He co-founded the Farm Workers Organizing Committee, focused on improving the living conditions for farm workers in the region and co-founded the Canadian Farmworkers Union in 1978 to improve the living and working standards of farmworkers and focus on human rights, health and safety of the workers across the country.

He was the co-founder of British Columbia Organization to Fight Racism in the early 1980s, which was set up to counter the actions of right-wing extremist groups including the local Ku Klux Klan. During the 1980s and 1990s, the organization's offices were repeatedly vandalized and the family subjected to many threats to their lives as they advocated actions against racially motivated attacks.

Some of his other roles as a human rights activist included serving as an executive member of the BC Human Rights Coalition and serving as the president of the BC Organization to Fight Racism. He was also the founder of Progressive Intercultural Community Services Society, and also of the Rainbow Community Health Co-operative. Through these organizations he worked for the health and social justice actions for the South-Asian community in British Columbia. Some of the other causes advanced by these organizations included combating domestic violence, elder abuse, and support programs for visible minorities.

Gill was inducted to the Order of British Columbia in 1999. He received the BC Achievement Foundation Community Award in 2010 with the nomination statement stating that he was known "for doing more for his community in one single day than most will do in an entire lifetime”. He was also the recipient of the Queen’s Golden Jubilee Medal in 2002.

In 2010, Gill was one of the recipients of the Top 25 Canadian Immigrant Awards presented by Canadian Immigrant magazine.

== Personal life ==
Gill and his wife, Daljit Gill, had three children. The family moved to Canada from India in 1969, two years after Gill moved. He died on 2 February 2021, in Langley, British Columbia, from cancer. He was 84.
