= Eric Woodward (politician) =

Canadian politician

11th Mayor of Langley Township
- In office November 7, 2022 – November 2, 2026
- Preceded by: Jack Froese
- Succeeded by: Jay Lundgren

Langley Township Councillor
- In office November 12, 2018 – November 7, 2022

Personal details
- Born: c. 1973
- Party: Contract with Langley; British Columbia Liberal Party (c. mid 2020); British Columbia New Democratic Party (c. August–September 2020)
- Occupation: Businessperson, Developer

Eric Woodward (born November 11, 1972) is a Canadian politician. He served one term as Mayor of Langley Township, British Columbia from 2022-2026.

== Early life and career ==
Woodward was raised by his single mother and grandparents in Langley city, at 53rd Ave and 202nd St. He attended H. D. Stafford Middle School and Langley Secondary School.

Woodward attended the University of British Columbia, where he earned a political science degree. After graduating, he co-founded several technology companies. He sold his last company in 2007, and began buying up properties in Fort Langley, starting up the Fort Langley charitable organization in 2005. He often clashed with Township Council and bureaucrats due to his desire to redevelop commercial properties he owned in Fort Langley, and his building of the Coulter Berry Building was opposed by many in the community. The dispute resulted in an unsuccessful attempt by residents to sue the Township which allowed the building to go ahead. He also faced local criticism after having one of his boarded-up properties painted pink following a dispute with the Township. He had bought the property with the plan to replace it with a mixed-use project. He was eventually forced to paint the house grey.

From 2012 to 2017, he served as the president of the Fort Langley Business Improvement Association, and was director of the Langley Memorial Hospital Foundation from 2014 to 2018. In 2015, he supported the "No" side in the 2015 Metro Vancouver transit plebiscite, citing that it would hurt local retailers and customers.

== Political career ==
In 2018, he transferred his Fort Langley properties to a new charitable foundation he set up called the "Eric Woodward Foundation". He did this to avoid a possible conflict of interest prior to running for a spot on Township Council in 2018. Later, it was revealed that Woodward never transferred the properties to the Foundation. Woodward had previously considered running for mayor of the Township in the election, citing his desire to help "Langley become better". He opted against running for mayor, and instead decided to run for council. In the 2018 municipal election, he was elected to Township Council, finishing second on the eight-seat body, winning 11,600 votes.

In 2020, Woodward was acclaimed as the British Columbia New Democratic Party candidate in Langley East for the 2020 British Columbia general election. However, he resigned as a candidate the next day, following "horrible, false personal attacks". Following his resignation as a candidate, it was revealed that he had also sought the nomination of the BC Liberals earlier in the year, but had not been approved as a candidate. Woodward stated that he did not pursue the Liberal candidacy due to a controversy over a Liberal MLA's anti-LGBTQ views.

Following the announcement that the township's mayor Jack Froese would be retiring, Woodward entered the race to succeed him for the municipality's top job in the 2022 municipal elections. With his announcement, he also created a local municipal party known as "Contract with Langley" which would run a slate for council and the local school board. In the election, Woodward ran on a platform of fixing the "chronic infrastructure deficit in roads, parks and facilities with a new plan for growth". He had an "ambitious plan to increase affordable housing", which involved a strategy of requiring developers to include 10% of all housing stock be devoted to affordable housing, and streamlining the permit process to speed up the building of new homes. Woodward easily won the election, defeating former councillor Blair Whitmarsh by more than 4,000 votes, and nearly 6,000 votes ahead of the third place former BC Liberal MLA Rich Coleman. Woodward's victory included the election of five members of his party, to council, as well as three members to the Langley School Board. In addition to Woodward's priorities, the party ran on the promise of new community amenities such as an indoor campus for the Langley United Soccer Association, a community centre and an indoor pool in Willoughby.

As mayor, he promised to fix up an abandoned property on 34th Avenue which had become a dumping ground and had attracted squatters. He has faced criticized by opposition members of council for creating four new administrative positions that report primarily to him, despite not going through council first. Woodward called the criticisms a "conspiracy theory". In May 2023, the Township voted to have its own RCMP detachment, which had been shared with the City of Langley. Woodward supported the plan, stating it was over "unfair costs". As part of his initiative to build more homes in the municipality, Woodward has claimed to have reduced the waiting time to build a single family home from over a year to just a week.

In 2026, Woodward ran for re-election as mayor, heading (and acting as financial agent) for the Progress for Langley slate, against political rookie Jay Lundgren and the fledgling Langley Strong team. Woodward was defeated October 17, 2026, by a 54.21% to 45.79% margin. Only two of his 14 Progress for Langley candidates were elected, while Lundgren's Langley Strong took the mayoralty, six Township Council seats, and swept 6 seats on Langley School Board.
