= Abbotsford Senior Secondary School =

Location
- 33358 Bevan Ave; Abbotsford, British Columbia, V2S 0E7; Canada; 49°02′40″N 122°17′54″W

Information
- School type: Public, high school
- School district: School District 34 Abbotsford
- School number: 3434021
- Principal: Ryan
- Staff: 117
- Grades: 9-12
- Enrollment: 1100 (September 2018)
- Colour: Red/Black
- Team name: Panthers
- Website: www.abbysenior.com

Abbotsford Senior Secondary School is a public high school in Abbotsford, British Columbia, part of School District 34 Abbotsford.

== History ==
Abbotsford Secondary School was established in 1952, when Abbotsford was a village. The school's name was changed over the summer of 2006 to Abbotsford Collegiate, as part of the school district merging Abbotsford Senior Secondary and the Career Technical Centre. The name was changed back to Abbotsford Senior Secondary School in 2012.

Most of the original building was demolished and replaced in a project completed in 2012, with a three-storey, mostly wood rotunda connecting the old and new sections and serving as a focal point. It then had a capacity of 950 students.

In November 2016, two girls, aged 13 and 14, were stabbed at the school, one fatally. A 21-year-old drifter with no apparent connection to the school was subdued by staff and was charged with second-degree murder and aggravated assault charges. He was subsequently convicted of both charges in March 2020.

== Academics ==
Abbotsford Senior Secondary is one of thirteen schools in British Columbia offering the International Baccalaureate program.

== Sports ==
Abbotsford Senior Secondary's male and female basketball programs compete in AAA, and the senior girls basketball team won provincials in the 2020 season. The school's teams are the Panthers.

2025 EVAA AAA SR Boys Rugby Champions

== Notable alumni ==
- Chase Claypool, wide receiver for the Buffalo Bills
- Jack Froese, politician
