= Burnaby-Edmonds =

Defunct provincial electoral district in British Columbia, Canada

Coordinates: 49.206°N 122.977°W

British Columbia electoral district
- Location in Burnaby

Defunct provincial electoral district
- Legislature: Legislative Assembly of British Columbia
- First contested: 1966
- Last contested: 2020

Demographics
- Population (2001): 55,741
- Area (km²): 25.48
- Census division: Metro Vancouver
- Census subdivision: Burnaby

Burnaby-Edmonds is a former provincial electoral district for the Legislative Assembly of British Columbia, Canada in use from 1966 to 2024.

Under the 2021 redistribution that took effect for the 2024 election, the riding was divided between the new districts of Burnaby South-Metrotown (taking in most portions west of Griffiths Drive), and Burnaby-New Westminster (taking in portions east of it, including the Edmonds community). A small part was transferred to Burnaby Centre.

== Geography ==
The district is located in southern Burnaby. It is bordered by Boundary Road to the west, Imperial and Mayfield Streets to the north, 4th Street to the east, and 10th Avenue and Fraser River to the south.

== Electoral history ==
Burnaby-Edmonds
Assembly	Years	Member	Party
Riding created from Burnaby
28th	1966–1969	Gordon Dowding	New Democratic
29th	1969–1972	Gordon Dowding	New Democratic
30th	1972–1975	Gordon Dowding	New Democratic
31st	1975–1979	Raymond Loewen	Social Credit
32nd	1979–1983	Rosemary Brown	New Democratic
33rd	1983–1986	Rosemary Brown	New Democratic
34th	1986–1991	David Mercier	Social Credit
35th	1991–1996	Fred G. Randall	New Democratic
36th	1996–2001	Fred G. Randall	New Democratic
37th	2001–2005	Patty Sahota	Liberal
38th	2005–2009	Raj Chouhan	New Democratic
39th	2009–2013	Raj Chouhan	New Democratic
40th	2013–2017	Raj Chouhan	New Democratic
41st	2017–2020	Raj Chouhan	New Democratic
42nd	2020–2024	Raj Chouhan	New Democratic
Riding dissolved into Burnaby South-Metrotown and Burnaby-New Westminster

== Election results ==
2020 British Columbia general election
Party	Candidate	Votes	%	±%	Expenditures
New Democratic	Raj Chouhan	11,063	62.01	+7.76	$38,987.91
Liberal	Tripat Atwal	4,754	26.65	−5.43	$62,427.04
Green	Iqbal Parekh	2,023	11.34	−2.33	$889.57
Total valid votes		17,840	100.00	–	
Total rejected ballots		196	1.10		
Turnout		18036	44.36		
Registered voters		40655			
Source: Elections BC

2017 British Columbia general election
Party	Candidate	Votes	%	±%	Expenditures
New Democratic	Raj Chouhan	10,827	54.25	+2.82	$47,595.75
Liberal	Garrison Duke	6,404	32.08	−6.55	$42,998.98
Green	Valentine Wu	2,728	13.67	+4.93	$2,758.14
Total valid votes		19,959	100.00	–	
Total rejected ballots		156	0.78	−0.34	
Turnout		20,115	53.81	+4.81	
Registered voters		37,385			
Source: Elections BC

2013 British Columbia general election
Party	Candidate	Votes	%	±%	Expenditures
New Democratic	Raj Chouhan	9,253	51.43	-0.51	$79,346
Liberal	Jeff Kuah	6,950	38.63	+0.27	$20,696
Green	Wyatt Tessari	1,573	8.74	+2.00	$600
Excalibur	Nicholas Edward D'Amico	215	1.20	–	$341
Total valid votes		17,991	100.00		
Total rejected ballots		203	1.12		
Turnout		18,194	49.00		
Source: Elections BC

B.C. General Election 2009 Burnaby-Edmonds
Party	Candidate	Votes	%	±	Expenditures
New Democratic	Raj Chouhan	8,647	51.94%	+20.52%	$75,002
Liberal	Lee Rankin	6,385	38.36%	-7.71%	$80,469
Green	Carrie McLaren	1,122	6.74%	-3.17%	$383
Libertarian	Dan Cancade	493	2.96%	+2.96%	$643
Total valid votes		16,647	100%		
Total rejected ballots		178	1.06%		
Turnout		16,825	49.07%		

B.C. General Election 2005: Burnaby-Edmonds
Party	Candidate	Votes	%	±	Expenditures
NDP	Raj Chouhan	10,337	46.71%	+5.23%	$71,644
Liberal	Patty Sahota	9,599	43.38%	-5.02%	$109,119
Green	Suzanne Deveau	2,192	9.91%	–	$1,754
Total valid votes		22,128	100%		
Total rejected ballots		155	0.70%		
Turnout		22,283	57.70%		

2001 British Columbia general election
Party	Candidate	Votes	%	Expenditures
Liberal	Patty Sahota	9,607	51.09	$34,249
New Democratic	Sav Dhaliwal	4,924	26.19	$48,520
Green	Eric Hawthorne	2,599	13.82	$2,231
Unity	Grant Murray	1,111	5.91	$7,646
Marijuana	Roy Arjun	456	2.43	$394
Citizens	Gordon S. Watson	105	0.56	$1,150
Total valid votes		18,802	100.00	
Total rejected ballots		120	0.64	
Turnout		18,922	69.90	

B.C. General Election 1996: Burnaby-Edmonds
Party	Candidate	Votes	%	±	Expenditures
NDP	Fred G. Randall	9,912	46.45%	-0.70%	$41,298
Liberal	Judy St. Denis	8,770	41.09%	-8.39%	$52,980
Progressive Democrat	John Schwermer	1,067	5.00%	–	$200
Reform	Carlos Brito	1,008	4.72%		$1,921
Green	Eric Hawthorne	387	1.81%	–	$655
Social Credit	Suraj Narain	120	0.56%	–	
Natural Law	Guy Harvey	77	0.36%		$136
Total valid votes		21,341	100.00%		
Total rejected ballots		172	0.80%		
Turnout		21,513	70.63%		

B.C. General Election 1991: Burnaby-Edmonds
Party	Candidate	Votes	%	±	Expenditures
NDP	Fred G. Randall	9,947	47.15%		$75,824
Liberal	Carlos A. Brito	6,898	32.70%		$4,470
Social Credit	Peter M. Wearing	3,900	18.49%	–	$33,816
Green	Elizabeth D. Smith	199	0.94%	–	$100
Conservative	Debra J. A. Hicks	77	0.37%		$40
Independent	Kurt Gruen	74	0.35%		$2,386
Total valid votes		21,095	100.00%		
Total rejected ballots		544	2.51%		
Turnout		21,639	72.71%		

== See also ==
- List of British Columbia provincial electoral districts
- Canadian provincial electoral districts

Legislative Assembly of British Columbia
Preceded by Abbotsford South	Constituency represented by the speaker 2020–2024	Succeeded by Burnaby-New Westminster
