= Ross Siemens =

Canadian politician

His worship Ross Siemens

Mayor of Abbotsford, British Columbia
- Incumbent
- Assumed office November 7, 2022
- Preceded by: Henry Braun

Abbotsford District Alderman
- In office 1986–1990

Abbotsford City Councillor
- In office 2014–2022

Personal details
- Born: Abbotsford, British Columbia
- Party: British Columbia Social Credit Party (c. 1985–1990); AbbotsfordFirst (2014–2022)
- Spouse: Kelly-Jean Kool (m. 1992)
- Children: 2
- Occupation: Businessman

Ross Allan Siemens (born c. 1963) is a Canadian politician. He has served as the mayor of Abbotsford, British Columbia since 2022.

== Early life ==
Siemens was born in Abbotsford, and grew up there. His paternal grandparents were Mennonites from Russia who immigrated to Saskatchewan in 1925, before settling in the Abbotsford region in 1951. The Siemens family established an automotive service company called Hub Motor Service, which passed on to Ross' father Jake before passing to Ross in 1994. Siemens' maternal ancestors were one of the original settlers of the Matsqui Prairie.

Siemens attended Fraser Valley College where he took business administration. He was active with the British Columbia Social Credit Party, becoming president of the Central Fraser Valley Young Social Credit Association in 1985, and worked for the party in the 1986 British Columbia general election.

== Political career ==
Siemens was first elected to Abbotsford District Council in 1986 at the age of 23, becoming the youngest councillor in Abbotsford's history. At the time, he was a partner and assistant manager at Siemens Garage Ltd. He ran on a campaign that included "growth, a positive approach to investment and business and a long term approach to municipal planning". In the election, Siemens won 961 votes district-wide, winning the second most number of votes on the three-seat council. Siemens was re-elected in the 1988 municipal elections, winning 1,612 votes, the most of all candidates running.

While serving on district council, he was involved in creating Business Improvement Area legislation which would form the Abbotsford Downtown Business Association. Siemens did not run for re-election in 1990.

After retiring from politics, Siemens moved to Hong Kong in 1991 to do missionary work with a youth mission, with Teen Challenge in Macau, and taught English for a semester at Shenzhen University. He came back to Canada and took over the family business in 1994.

After 24 years outside of politics, Siemens was elected to Abbotsford City Council in the 2014 municipal election running for the Abbotsford First slate. Siemens placed fourth on the eight seat council race, winning 11,255 votes city-wide. Siemens was re-elected in the 2018 municipal election, placing sixth with 14,872 votes.

Following the retirement of his predecessor, Henry Braun, Siemens ran for mayor of Abbotsford in the 2022 municipal election, as an Independent, stating that AbbotsfordFirst does not run mayoral candidates. In the election, Siemens won 64% of the vote, defeating his next nearest opponent Manjit Sohi by over 8000 votes. After his election as mayor, Siemens said his first priorities would be "working with council on a strategic plan and an extensive review of the official community plan", as well as to continue "to work with senior levels of government on future flood protection,... to better prepare for future Fraser River flooding,... the renovation of the Abbotsford Police Department headquarters, and intersection and overpass changes related to freeway improvements".

As mayor, Siemens welcomed the clearing of the controversial Lonzo Road tent encampment, citing safety concerns.
