= Abbotsford City Council =

Type
- Type: Unicameral

Leadership
- Mayor: Ross Siemens, Independent
- Seats: 8 councillors and mayor

Elections
- Voting system: Plurality at-large (councillors); First past the post (mayor)
- Last election: October 15, 2022
- Next election: October 2026

Meeting place
- Abbotsford City Hall; Abbotsford, British Columbia

Website
- City Council Website

Abbotsford City Council is the governing body for the City of Abbotsford, British Columbia, Canada.

The council consists of the mayor and eight elected city councillors representing the city as a whole

Municipal elections are held every four years across the Province on the third Saturday of November.

== Abbotsford City Council members ==
Elected in the 2022 municipal election

Council membership

Name	Party	Position
Ross Siemens	Independent	Mayor
Les Barkman	Independent	Councillor
Kelly Chahal	Abbotsford First	Councillor
Patricia Driessen	Independent	Councillor
Simon Gibson	Independent	Councillor
Dave Loewen	Independent	Councillor
Patricia Ross	Independent	Councillor
Dave Sidhu	Independent	Councillor
Mark Warkentin	Abbotsford First	Councillor

2018-2022

- Mayor Henry Braun, Mayor - Independent
- R. Bruce Banman, Councillor - Independent (until 2021)
- Les Barkman, Councillor - Independent
- Sandy Blue, Councillor - AbbotsfordFirst
- Kelly Chahal, Councillor - AbbotsfordFirst
- Brenda Falk, Councillor - Independent (since 2021) AbbotsfordFirst (2018-2021)
- Dave Loewen, Councillor - Independent
- Patricia Ross, Councillor - Independent
- Dave Sidhu, Councillor - Independent (since 2021)
- Ross Siemens, Councillor - AbbotsfordFirst

2014-2018

- Henry Braun, Mayor - Independent
- Les Barkman, Councillor - Independent
- Sandy Blue, Councillor - AbbotsfordFirst
- Kelly Chahal, Councillor - AbbotsfordFirst
- Brenda Falk, Councillor - AbbotsfordFirst
- Moe Gill, Councillor - Independent
- Dave Loewen, Councillor - Independent
- Patricia Ross, Councillor - Independent
- Ross Siemens, Councillor - AbbotsfordFirst

2011-2014

- Dr. Bruce Banman, Mayor
- Les Barkman, Councillor
- Henry Braun, Councillor
- Bill MacGregor, Councillor
- Simon Gibson, Councillor
- Moe Gill, Councillor
- Dave Loewen, Councillor
- Patricia Ross, Councillor
- John Smith, Councillor

== Former Mayors and Councillors ==
- Ed Fast - Deputy Mayor
- George Peary - Mayor 2008-2011 and City Councillor 1990-2008
- Mary Reeves - former Mayor (2002-2005)
- George F. Ferguson - Mayor of Abbotsford District 1972–1995, Mayor of Abbotsford 1995-2002, Mayor of Abbotsford 2005-2008
