= Burnaby-New Westminster (provincial electoral district) =

Provincial electoral district in British Columbia, Canada

British Columbia electoral district
- Location in Burnaby and New Westminster
- First contested: 2024
- Last contested: 2026

Provincial electoral district
- Legislature: Legislative Assembly of British Columbia
MLA
Raj Chouhan
New Democratic
- District created: 2023

Demographics
- Census division: Metro Vancouver
- Census subdivision(s): Burnaby, New Westminster

Burnaby-New Westminster is a provincial electoral district for the Legislative Assembly of British Columbia, Canada. Created under the 2021 British Columbia electoral redistribution, the riding was contested for the first time in the 2024 British Columbia general election. It was created out of parts of Burnaby-Edmonds, New Westminster and Burnaby-Lougheed.

== Geography ==
The district comprises the Burnaby neighbourhoods of Edmonds and Middle Gate, as well as the adjacent New Westminster neighbourhoods of Kelvin, Eastburn, and Connaught Heights.

== Members of the Legislative Assembly ==
Assembly	Years	Member	Party
Riding created from Burnaby-Edmonds and New Westminster
43rd	2024–2026	Raj Chouhan	New Democratic
44th	2026–present	Raj Chouhan	New Democratic

== Election results ==
2026 British Columbia general election
** Preliminary results — Not yet official **
Party	Candidate	Votes	%	±%
New Democratic	Raj Chouhan	7,748	55.70	-4.29
Conservative	Joe Latam	6,163	44.30	+9.59
Green	~~Greg DePaco~~	–	–	–
Total valid votes		13,911	96.65	
Total rejected ballots		482	3.35	+2.85
Turnout		14,393		
Registered voters				
New Democratic hold		Swing		-6.94
Source: Elections BC
Note: Green Party nominee Greg DePaco withdrew from the race, but his name will remain on the ballot as ballot printing had already begun at the time of his withdrawal. Election officials will inform voters at voting places that DePaco has withdrawn as a candidate.

2024 British Columbia general election
Party	Candidate	Votes	%	±%	Expenditures
New Democratic	Raj Chouhan	10,647	59.99	-3.4	$48,886.34
Conservative	Deepak Suri	6,161	34.71	+33.3	$15,841.58
Independent	Daniel Kofi Ampong	940	5.30	–	$0.00
Total valid votes/expense limit		17,748	99.50	–	$71,700.08
Total rejected ballots		89	0.50	–	
Turnout		17,837	51.26	–	
Registered voters		34,794			
New Democratic notional hold		Swing		-18.4	
Source: Elections BC

2020 provincial election redistributed results
Party	%
New Democratic	63.4
Liberal	21.2
Green	13.5
Conservative	1.4

== See also ==
- List of British Columbia provincial electoral districts
- Canadian provincial electoral districts

Legislative Assembly of British Columbia
Preceded by Burnaby-Edmonds	Constituency represented by the speaker 2024–present	Incumbent
