= Burnaby Citizens Association =

Municipal political party in Canada

- Leader: Vacant
- Founded: 1955
- Headquarters: Burnaby, British Columbia
- Ideology: Social democracy
- Political position: Centre-left
- National affiliation: NDP
- Provincial affiliation: BC NDP
- Burnaby City Council: 7 / 9
- Burnaby School Board: 7 / 7

Website
- www.burnaby-citizens.ca

The Burnaby Citizens Association (BCA) is a social-democratic municipal political party in Burnaby, British Columbia. Since 1987, the BCA has been the dominant party in Burnaby politics, continuously holding a majority of seats on council up to the present day. The BCA is the official municipal affiliate of the BC NDP in Burnaby, and membership in the BCA requires membership in the BC NDP as a prerequisite.

== History ==
It was founded in 1955 by Alan Emmott and Eileen Dailly.

In October 2018 the BCA won 7 of 8 seats in the city council 2018 municipal election but the BCA incumbent Derek Corrigan lost the mayoral race to independent Mike Hurley.

On February 5, 2020, three councillors resigned from the BCA over housing policy disagreements and other party issues. In the 2021 by-election, following the deaths of two city councillors, the BCA won one of the two seats up for election.

== Election results ==
Burnaby Citizens Association election results for mayor of Burnaby
Election	Candidate	Votes	%	Position	Status
1977	Tom Constable	12,984	56.2	1st	Elected
1979	Tom Constable	8,823	41.66	2nd	Not elected
1981	Lee Rankin	11,647	40.57	2nd	Not elected
1983	Celeste Redman	6,685	32.79	2nd	Not elected
1985	Celeste Redman	6,062	26.83	2nd	Not elected
1987	Bill Copeland	12,494	49.98	1st	Elected
1990	Bill Copeland	21,270	67.84	1st	Elected
1993	Bill Copeland	18,355	74.37	1st	Elected
1996	Douglas Drummond	13,138	57.26	1st	Elected
1999	Douglas Drummond	11,877	47.64	1st	Elected
2002	Derek Corrigan	14,403	46.97	1st	Elected
2005	Derek Corrigan	17,662	54	1st	Elected
2008	Derek Corrigan	20,365	67	1st	Elected
2011	Derek Corrigan	25,035	76.01	1st	Elected
2014	Derek Corrigan	28,113	68.85	1st	Elected
2018	Derek Corrigan	20,333	41.23	2nd	Not elected
2022	None	-	-	-	Did not contest
2026	None	-	-	-	Did not contest

Burnaby Citizens Association election results for Burnaby city council
Election	Seats	+/–	Status
1977	4 / 8	Steady	Majority government
1979	3 / 8	▼1	Opposition
1981	1 / 8	▼2	Opposition
1983	2 / 8	▲1	Opposition
1985	2 / 8	Steady	Opposition
1987	6 / 8	▲4	Majority government
1990	6 / 8	Steady	Majority government
1996	6 / 8	Steady	Majority government
1996	7 / 8	▲1	Majority government
1999	5 / 8	▼2	Majority government
2002	7 / 8	▲2	Majority government
2005	4 / 8	▼3	Majority government
2008	8 / 8	Steady	Majority government
2011	8 / 8	Steady	Majority government
2014	8 / 8	Steady	Majority government
2018	7 / 8	▼1	Majority opposition
2022	6 / 8	▼1	Majority opposition
2026	7 / 8	▲1	Majority opposition
