= Derek Corrigan =

Canadian politician (born 1951/1952)

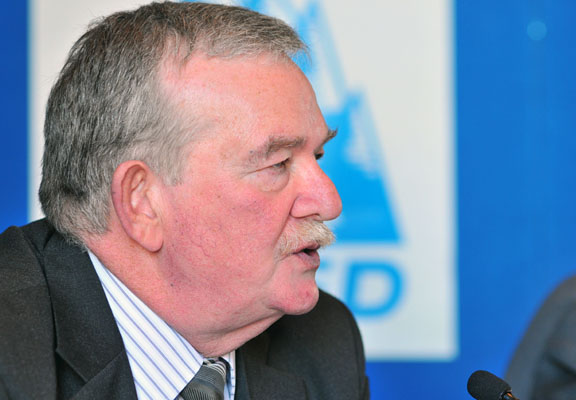

Mayor of Burnaby
- In office December 2, 2002 – November 5, 2018
- Preceded by: Douglas P. Drummond
- Succeeded by: Mike Hurley

Burnaby City Councillor
- In office 1987–2002

Personal details
- Born: Derek Richard Corrigan; 1951 or 1952 (age 74–75)
- Party: Burnaby Citizens Association (New Democratic)
- Spouse: Kathy Corrigan
- Profession: Lawyer

Derek Richard Corrigan (born 1951 or 1952) is a Canadian politician and the former longtime mayor of Burnaby, British Columbia, Canada.

== Early life and education ==
Corrigan is a graduate of Vancouver's Sir Charles Tupper Secondary School and studied political science and philosophy at the University of British Columbia. He then obtained his law degree from the same university in 1977 and joined the Bar of British Columbia in 1978.

Corrigan first articled to and then practised as associate counsel with James Lorimer until May 1978. He was a partner in Corrigan, Bernardino, Dorman and Baker from 1978 until 1990. After that he practised in association with Joanne Challenger and Paul McMurray, both criminal defence counsel, for several years, and then was associate counsel with the Vancouver law firm Lindsay Kenney. Corrigan practised primarily as criminal defence counsel.

After several unsuccessful attempts, he became a city councillor of the Burnaby City Council in 1987 and served for 15 years. He was elected mayor in 2002 and re-elected in 2005, 2008, 2011, and 2014.

In 2004, Corrigan was a staunch opponent of the construction of the Canada Line. He said, "I've been trying to kill this blood-sucking vampire for some time. I think there will be a tax revolt when people realize how much this is going to cost them. You and your children's children will be paying for this project for decades."

In the 2018 election, Corrigan lost to Mike Hurley. Corrigan's loss is credited to his stance on affordable housing and the rapid rate of renters being evicted in favour of condo development.

== Personal life ==
In 2009, Corrigan's wife, Kathy, was elected to the Legislative Assembly of British Columbia as the New Democratic MLA for Burnaby-Deer Lake. She did not seek re-election in 2017.
