= 2011 British Columbia municipal elections =

Canadian municipal elections

- 19 November 2011

Municipal elections were held in the Canadian province of British Columbia on November 19, 2011. Races were held in all municipalities and regional district electoral areas.

Selected mayoral races are as follows:

== Abbotsford ==
Candidate	Vote	%
Bruce Banman	13,387	
George Peary (X)	12,694	
Travis Daleman	2,449	
Gerda Peachey	1,619	
Meghann Coughlan	1,443	

== Burnaby ==
Candidate	Party	Vote	%
Derek Corrigan (X)	Burnaby Citizens Association	25,035	76.01
Tom Tao	TEAM Burnaby	5,450	16.55
Allen Hutton	Independent	1,600	4.86
Sylvia Gung	Independent	850	2.58

== Campbell River ==
Candidate	Vote	%
Walter Jakeway	2,741	
Roy Grant	2,702	
Ziggy Stewart	1,228	
Michael Rabu	582	

== Castlegar ==
Candidate	Vote	%
Lawrence Chernoff (X)	1,020	
Gordon Zaitsoff	786	

== Central Saanich ==
Candidate	Vote	%
Alastair Bryson	2,753	
Christopher Graham	1,827	

== Chilliwack ==
Candidate	Vote	%
Sharon Gaetz (X)	Acclaimed	

== Coldstream ==
Candidate	Vote	%
Jim Garlick (X)	1,578	
Dave Hrabchuk	829	

== Colwood ==
Candidate	Vote	%
Carol Hamilton	1,412	
Brian Tucknott	1,042	
Jason Nault	621	

== Comox ==
Candidate	Vote	%
Paul Ives	2,163	
Bernie Poole	2,109	

== Coquitlam ==
Candidate	Vote	%
Richard Stewart (X)	10,050	
Barrie Lynch	7,591	

== Courtenay ==
Candidate	Vote	%
Larry Jangula	2,543	
Greg Phelps (X)	2,466	
William Bate	257	

== Cranbrook ==
Candidate	Vote	%
Wayne Stetski	2,185	
Jim Wavrecan	1,704	
Pat O'Connell	863	
John York	107	

== Dawson Creek ==
Candidate	Vote	%
Mike Bernier (X)	Acclaimed	

== Delta ==
Candidate	Party	Vote	%
Lois Jackson	Delta Independent Voters Association	10,044	43.17
Krista Engelland	One Delta	6,158	26.47
Heather King	Independent	5,346	22.98
John Meech	Independent	1,720	7.39

== Esquimalt ==
Candidate	Vote	%
Barbara Desjardins (X)	Acclaimed	

== Fort St. John ==
Candidate	Vote	%
Lori Ackerman	1,269	
Don Irwin	1,209	
Mike Murray	198	

== Gibsons ==
=== Mayoral election ===
The results for mayor of Gibsons were as follows:

Mayoral candidate	Votes	%
Wayne Rowe	1,124	
Barry Janyk (X)	759	
Arthur Shaw	23	

=== Gibsons Town Council election ===
The results for Gibsons Town Council were as follows:

Top 4 candidates elected

Council candidate	Vote	%
Gerry Tretick (X)	989	
LeeAnn Johnson (X)	954	
Charlene SanJenko	920	
Daniel Bouman	877	
Hammy McClymont	845	
Brian Sadler	731	
Bob Curry (X)	709	
Brain Hubenig	471	
Turnout		57%

== Hope ==
Candidate	Vote	%
Susan Ann Johnston	898	
Laurie French (X)	682	

== Juan de Fuca Electoral Area ==
The results in Capital Regional District Electoral Area H (Juan de Fuca) were as follows:

=== Director election ===
Director candidate	Vote	%
Mike Hicks (X)	666	58.32
Alanda Carver	476	41.68

== Kamloops ==
Candidate	Vote	%
Peter Milobar (X)	9,391	
Dieter Dudy	9,156	
Gordon Chow	441	
Brian Alexander	251	

== Kelowna ==
Candidate	Vote	%
Walter Gray	13,995	
Sharon Shepherd (X)	13,574	
Cal Condy	1,000	
Ken Chung	749	
Kim Ouellette	370	

== Lake Country ==
Candidate	Vote	%
James Baker (X)	988	
Jason McCarthy	713	
Noreen Guenther	530	
Bill Clark	449	

== Langford ==
Candidate	Vote	%
Stewart Young (X)	2,319	
Christopher Johnson	507	

== Langley (city) ==
Candidate	Vote	%
Peter Fassbender (X)	2,455	
Ron Abgrall	983	

== Langley Township ==
Mel Kositsky announced that he would run for mayor on September 11, 2011. In November, there was a political debate between the mayoral candidates for both Langley City and Langley Township. Kositsky spent $70,254 on his political campaign, while Jack Froese, who won the election, had spent $79,533.

Candidate	Party	Vote	%
Jack Froese	Independent	7,706	
Mel Kositsky	Independent	6,522	
Rick Green (X)	Vote Langley Now	4,466	

== Maple Ridge ==
Candidate	Vote	%
Ernie Daykin (X)	7,394	
Craig Ruthven	4,953	

== Mission ==
Candidate	Party	Vote	%
Ted Adlem	Citizens for responsible municipal government	3,728	
James Atebe (X)	Independent	2,465	
Mike Gildersleeve	Independent	827	
Daniel Williamson	Independent	343	

== Nanaimo ==
Candidate	Vote	%
John Ruttan (X)	8,815	
Roger McKinnon	5,366	
Jim Routledge	2,139	
Dan Didio	546	

== Nelson ==
Candidate	Vote	%
John Dooley (X)	1,790	
Richard Rowberry	481	
George Mercredi	105	

== New Westminster ==
Candidate	Vote	%
Wayne Wright (X)	6,633	
James Crosty	3,139	
Vance McFadyen	826	
François Nantel	207	

== North Cowichan ==
Candidate	Vote	%
Jon Lefebure	2,344	
Tom Walker (X)	2,328	
Joyce Behnsen	941	
Scott Baker	916	
Clayton Balabanov	415	

== North Saanich ==
Candidate	Vote	%
Alice Finall (X)	Acclaimed	

== North Vancouver City ==
Candidate	Vote	%
Darrell Mussatto (X)	5,037	
Ron Polly	758	
George Pringle	546	
Kit Nicholls	487	

== North Vancouver District ==
Candidate	Vote	%
Richard Walton (X)	9,897	
Marjorie Goodman	2,241	

== Oak Bay ==
Candidate	Vote	%
Nils Jensen	3,197	
Hazel Brathwaite	2,769	

== Parksville ==
Candidate	Vote	%
Chris Burger	2,355	
Paul Reitsma	749	
Rick Honaizer	76	
Antonio Farinha	51	

== Penticton ==
Candidate	Vote	%
Dan Ashton (X)	3,124	
Julius Bloomfield	2,978	
Katie Robinson	1,989	
Vic Powell	372	
Jukka Laurio	22	

== Pitt Meadows ==
Candidate	Vote	%
Deb Walters	2,025	
John Becker	1,202	
Gary Paller	437	

== Port Alberni ==
Candidate	Vote	%
John Douglas	2,556	
Ken McRae (X)	1,794	
Jen Fisher-Bradley	194	
Stacey Gaiga	166	

== Port Coquitlam ==
Candidate	Party	Vote	%
Greg Moore (X)	Independent	5,827	
William Issa	Canada Fire Safety Corporation	1,691	
Patrick Alambets	Independent	310	

== Port Moody ==
Candidate	Vote	%
Mike Clay	3,154	
Robert Simons	2,019	
Katie Kickbush	321	

== Powell River ==
Candidate	Vote	%
Dave Formosa	2,325	
Stewart Alsgard (X)	2,078	

== Prince George ==
Candidate	Vote	%
Shari Green	6,969	
Dan Rogers (X)	5,332	
Alex Huber	1,200	
Brandon Lewis	707	
Eugene Fetterly	513	
Bruce Fader	306	

== Prince Rupert ==
Candidate	Vote	%
Jack Mussallem (X)	1,769	
Kathleen Bedard	981	
Corinna Morhart	357	

== Richmond ==
Candidate	Vote	%
Malcolm Brodie (X)	20,955	69.83
Richard Lee	9,054	30.17

== Saanich ==
Candidate	Vote	%
Frank Leonard (X)	11,151	
David Cubberley	9,526	
David Shebib	173	

== Salmon Arm ==
Candidate	Vote	%
Nancy Cooper	2,745	
Kevin Flynn	2,214	
Ronald Telfer	149	

== Salt Spring Island Electoral Area ==
The results in Capital Regional District Electoral Area F (Salt Spring Island) were as follows:

=== Director election ===
Director candidate	Vote	%
Wayne McIntyre	1,329	36.63
Carole Eyles	1,147	31.62
Garth Hendren (X)	383	10.56
Leslie Wallace	362	9.98
Dietrich Luth	229	6.31
Ken Lee	178	4.91

== Sidney ==
Candidate	Vote	%
Larry Cross (X)	2,185	
Jack Barker	704	

== Smithers ==
Candidate	Vote	%
Taylor Bachrach	896	58.52
Cress Farrow (X)	635	41.48

== Sooke ==
Candidate	Vote	%
Wendal Milne	2,571	
David Bennett	931	

== Southern Gulf Islands Electoral Area ==
The results in Capital Regional District Electoral Area G (Southern Gulf Islands) were as follows:

=== Director election ===
Director candidate	Vote	%
David Howe	Acclaimed	

== Squamish ==
Candidate	Vote	%
Rob Kirkham (X)	2,283	
Auli Parviainen	2,104	
Ron Bahm	147	

== Summerland ==
Candidate	Vote	%
Janice Perrino (X)	Acclaimed	

== Surrey ==
Candidate	Party	Vote	%
Dianne Watts (X)	Surrey First	55,826	80.29
Ross Buchanan	Independent	6,267	9.01
Vikram Bajwa	Independent	4,481	6.44
Clifford Inimgba	Independent	1,183	1.70
Deanna Welters	Independent	1,147	1.65
Shan Rana	Independent	330	0.47
Touraj Ghanbar-Zadeh	Independent	298	0.43
Joginder Ranhawa	Independent	0	0.00

The main opposition party, the Surrey Civic Coalition did not field a mayoral candidate against Watts. They did run a slate for city council, however, but did not win any seats.

== Terrace ==
Candidate	Vote	%
David Pernarowski (X)	1211	
Bruce Martindale	630	
Jennifer Lewis	210	
Merv Ritchie	169	
Don Dunster	27	

== Vernon ==
Candidate	Vote	%
Robert Sawatzky	4,421	
Wayne Lippert (X)	2,538	
Patrick Davies	1,858	

== Victoria ==
Candidate	Party	Vote	%
Dean Fortin (X)	Independent	10,080	
Paul Brown	Open Victoria	4,229	
Steve Filipovic	Independent	2,206	
David Shebib	Independent	161	

== West Kelowna ==
Candidate	Vote	%
Doug Findlater (X)	3,734	
Rosalind Neis	2,126	

== West Vancouver ==
Candidate	Vote	%
Michael Smith	Acclaimed	

== Williams Lake ==
Candidate	Vote	%
Kerry Cook (X)	1,777	
Scott Nelson	1,090	
Walter Cobb	747	

== White Rock ==
Candidate	Vote	%
Wayne Baldwin	2,169	
Lynne Sinclair	1,690	
Larry Anschell	706	
Angelo Megla	24	

== Bibliography ==
- CivicInfo BC
- Unofficial results
