= Mike Hurley =

Canadian politician (born 1958)

His Worship Mike Hurley

Mayor of Burnaby
- Incumbent
- Assumed office November 5, 2018
- Preceded by: Derek Corrigan

Chair of the Metro Vancouver Regional District Board of Directors
- Incumbent
- Assumed office July 2024
- Preceded by: George Harvie

Personal details
- Born: Michael Hurley; 1958 (age 67–68) Magherafelt, Northern Ireland
- Citizenship: Canada
- Party: Independent
- Children: 4
- Occupation: Firefighter

Michael Hurley (born 1958) is a Canadian politician who has served as the mayor of Burnaby, British Columbia, on Burnaby City Council since 2018.

== Early life ==
Hurley was born in 1958, in Magherafelt, Northern Ireland. In 1983, he moved to Canada. In 1988, he joined the Burnaby Fire Department. He served as vice president of the International Association of Fire Fighters until he resigned after being elected as mayor.

== Mayor ==
In October 2018, Hurley, running as an independent candidate, defeated long-time Burnaby mayor Derek Corrigan. A key factor in his victory was his opposition to the Metrotown demovictions under Corrigan. In 2020, Hurley was selected as a winner of the Top 25 Canadian Immigrant Awards by Canadian Immigrant magazine.

In the 2022 municipal election, Hurley retained his mayoral title by acclamation.

In 2025, he called on the provincial government to repeal housing legislation that required municipalities to allow density near public transit hubs.

In August 2026, he announced he would seek re-election in the 2026 municipal election. He retained his seat as mayor and was sworn in on November 10, 2026.

Government offices
Preceded by Derek Corrigan	Mayor of Burnaby; 2018–present	Succeeded by Incumbent
