= Jack Froese =

Canadian politician

His Worship Jack Froese
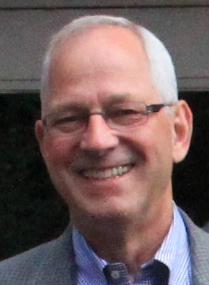

Mayor of the Township of Langley, British Columbia
- In office December 5, 2011 – November 7, 2022
- Preceded by: Rick Green
- Succeeded by: Eric Woodward

Personal details
- Born: Stanley Jack Froese
- Spouse: Debbie Froese (m. 1973; died 2020)
- Children: 3
- Occupation: Politician, Turkey Farmer, Police Officer

Stanley Jack Froese is a Canadian politician who served as mayor of the Township of Langley, British Columbia, Canada from 2011 to 2022.

== Early life ==
Jack Froese attended Abbotsford Senior Secondary School, graduating in 1972. Froese moved to Langley in 1979, where he purchased a farm and operated a turkey farm called JD Farms Specialty Turkey. Froese also worked as a police officer in the Vancouver Police Department, retiring in 2004.

== Mayor of Langley ==
Jack Froese was first elected mayor in 2011, defeating incumbent mayor, Rick Green. Froese was then re-elected in 2014 and 2018. During 2012, Froese was awarded the Diamond Jubilee medal. On January 9, 2020, his wife, Debbie, died due to cancer at the age of 66.

Froese served as the Vice-Chair of the Mayors' Council on the TransLink board. In July 2018, he voted to approve a SkyTrain extension from King George Station in Surrey to Langley City. On October 2, 2019, he voted to replace the Massey Tunnel with a new, 8-lane tunnel.

During Froese's term as mayor, Froese spent $7.7 million on the expansion of the Langley Events Centre. He also pledged $27 million in funding for widening a stretch of the Trans-Canada Highway from Langley to Aldergrove, which was known for congestion and crashes.

On April 11, 2022, Froese announced that he would not seek re-election in that year's municipal election and his retirement from politics.
