= 2026 British Columbia municipal elections =

Canadian municipal elections

- October 17, 2026
- Registered: 3,738,182

Municipal elections in British Columbia were held on October 17, 2026. Voters in the Canadian province of British Columbia elected mayors, school board trustees, rural directors, city councillors, and Islands Trust trustees in all of the province's municipalities and regional district electoral areas. Elections BC administered campaign financing, disclosure and advertisement of candidates; however, voting, ballots and candidate nominations were administered by each jurisdiction's local electoral officer. Mayors were elected using the first-past-the-post election system. City councillors, trustees, and directors were elected using plurality block voting, where each voter has the right to cast up to as many votes as there are seats to fill.

Incumbents marked with "(X)". Candidates who were elected are listed in boldface and accompanied by a †.

These elections overlapped with the 2026 British Columbia general election, which was held on October 24, 2026.

== Timeline ==
- January 1, 2026 – Election period begins
- May 31, 2026 – Expense limits published
- July 20, 2026 – Pre-campaign period begins
- July 31, 2026 – Deadline to apply to register an elector organization
- September 1, 2026 – Nomination period begins
- September 11, 2026 – Close of nominations
- September 18, 2026 – Final day for candidates to withdraw
- September 19, 2026 – Campaign period begins
- October 17, 2026 – General Voting Day
- January 15, 2027 – Disclosure statement filing deadline
- February 16, 2027 – Late filing deadline for disclosure statements (with $500 fee)

== Political parties ==
The following is the list of elector organizations (or political parties) that are running candidates in the 2026 municipal elections.

| Jurisdiction | Parties | Affiliate(s) |
|---|---|---|
| Abbotsford | Abbotsford Voice | |
| Abbotsford School District | Abbotsford Conservatives Together | |
| Burnaby | Burnaby Citizens Association | British Columbia New Democratic Party |
| Burnaby | Burnaby First | |
| Burnaby | Burnaby Green Party | |
| Burnaby | New Burnaby Party | |
| Burnaby | Restore Burnaby Alliance | |
| Burnaby School District | Burnaby Citizens Association | |
| Burnaby School District | Burnaby Green Party | |
| Burnaby School District | New Burnaby Party | |
| Burnaby School District | Restore Burnaby Alliance | |
| Central Saanich | Sustain OUR Central Saanich | |
| Chilliwack | Conservative Electors Association | Multi-jurisdictional party |
| Delta | Achieving For Delta | |
| Delta | Delta First | |
| Delta | One Delta | |
| Delta School District | Achieving For Delta | |
| Delta School District | One Delta | |
| Greater Victoria School District | Victoria For All | |
| Kamloops | Pivot Kamloops | |
| Langley City | Achieving for Langley City | |
| Langley City | Langley City First | |
| Langley School District | Langley Strong | |
| Langley School District | Progress for Langley Association | |
| Langley Township | Langley Strong | |
| Langley Township | Progress for Langley Association | |
| Maple Ridge | A Better Maple Ridge | |
| Nanaimo | REAL Nanaimo | |
| Nechako Lakes School District | ParentsVoice BC | |
| New Westminster | Community First New West | British Columbia New Democratic Party |
| New Westminster | New West Progressives | |
| New Westminster School District | Community First New West | British Columbia New Democratic Party |
| New Westminster School District | New West Progressives | |
| North Saanich | North Saanich Strong | |
| Penticton | Penticton Together Electors Association | |
| Port Moody | Port Moody Voice | |
| Richmond | Action Richmond | |
| Richmond | Advance Richmond Community Association | |
| Richmond | Common Sense Alliance Association | |
| Richmond | Conservative Electors Association | Multi-jurisdictional party |
| Richmond | ONE Richmond | |
| Richmond | RITE Richmond | |
| Richmond | Richmond Citizens' Association | |
| Richmond | Richmond Forward Voters Society | |
| Richmond | Richmond Strong | |
| Richmond | Richmond United Voters Association | |
| Richmond | We Are Richmond | |
| Richmond School District | Advance Richmond Community Association | |
| Richmond School District | Common Sense Alliance Association | |
| Richmond School District | Empower Education Richmond | |
| Richmond School District | Richmond Education Party | |
| Saanich | Save Our Saanich | |
| Sooke | Sooke First | |
| Sooke | Sooke Together | |
| Surrey | Conservative Electors Association | Multi-jurisdictional party |
| Surrey | Imagine Surrey | |
| Surrey | New Surrey+ Party | |
| Surrey | Surrey NOW | |
| Surrey | Safe Surrey Coalition | |
| Surrey | Surrey Connect | |
| Surrey | Surrey First | |
| Surrey School District | New Surrey+ | |
| Surrey School District | Our Surrey | |
| Surrey School District | Surrey NOW | |
| Surrey School District | Surrey First | |
| Vancouver | ABC Vancouver | |
| Vancouver | Affordable Housing Coalition of Vancouver | |
| Vancouver | Bright Future Vancouver | |
| Vancouver | Coalition of Progressive Electors | |
| Vancouver | Green Party of Vancouver | Green Party of British Columbia |
| Vancouver | OneCity Vancouver | |
| Vancouver | TEAM for a Livable Vancouver | |
| Vancouver | TrueBlue Vancouver | |
| Vancouver | Vancouver Liberal Electors Association | |
| Vancouver | Vote Vancouver | |
| Vancouver Park Board | ABC Vancouver | |
| Vancouver Park Board | Coalition of Progressive Electors | |
| Vancouver Park Board | Green Party of Vancouver | Green Party of British Columbia |
| Vancouver Park Board | Independent Parks Party | |
| Vancouver Park Board | OneCity Vancouver | |
| Vancouver Park Board | TEAM for a Livable Vancouver | |
| Vancouver Park Board | Vancouver Liberal Electors Association | |
| Vancouver Park Board | Vote Vancouver | |
| Vancouver School Board | ABC Vancouver | |
| Vancouver School Board | Coalition of Progressive Electors | |
| Vancouver School Board | Green Party of Vancouver | Green Party of British Columbia |
| Vancouver School Board | OneCity Vancouver | |
| Vancouver School Board | TrueBlue Vancouver | |
| Vancouver School Board | Vancouver Liberal Electors Association | |
| Vancouver School Board | Vote Vancouver | |
| Victoria | Victoria For All | |
| White Rock | Together For White Rock | |

== Abbotsford ==
2026 Abbotsford municipal election

8 seats on Abbotsford City Council + 1 mayor (5 seats needed for majority)
- Turnout: 30.42%
- Mayoral election
| Candidate | Ross Siemens | Sukhi Dhami | Paul Mahil |
| Popular vote | 19,418 | 9,114 | 1,739 |
| Percentage | 62.12% | 29.15% | 5.56% |
mayor before election
Ross Siemens
Elected mayor
Ross Siemens
- City council election
| Party | Seats | +/– |
|---|---|---|
| Abbotsford Voice | 3 | +3 |
| Independents | 6 | −1 |
This lists parties that won seats. See the complete results below.

=== Mayoral election ===
The results for mayor of Abbotsford were as follows:

| Party | Mayoral candidate | Votes | % |
|---|---|---|---|
| **Independent** | **Ross Siemens** (X) † | **19,418** | **62.12** |
| Independent | Sukhi Dhami | 9,114 | 29.15 |
| Independent | Paul Mahil | 1,739 | 5.56 |
| Independent | David Pellikaan | 990 | 3.17 |

=== Abbotsford City Council election ===
The results for Abbotsford City Council were as follows:

Top 8 candidates elected

| Party | Council candidate | Votes | % |
|---|---|---|---|
| Independent | **Dave Sidhu** (X) † | **14,210** | **8.11** |
| **Abbotsford Voice** | **Patricia Driessen** (X) † | **13,143** | **7.50** |
| **Independent** | **Les Barkman** (X) † | **11,533** | **6.58** |
| **Abbotsford Voice** | **Kristy Mills** † | **10,621** | **6.06** |
| **Independent** | **Patricia Ross** (X) † | **10,538** | **6.01** |
| **Abbotsford Voice** | **Carmen Fast Hollett** † | **10,417** | **5.95** |
| **Independent** | **Amrik Narang** † | **10,272** | **5.86** |
| **Independent** | **Rick Thiessen** † | **9,378** | **5.35** |
| Independent | Skully White | 8,959 | 5.11 |
| Independent | Jasmit Phulka | 8,777 | 5.01 |
| Independent | Mark Warkentin (X) | 8,597 | 4.91 |
| Independent | Simon Gibson | 8,215 | 4.69 |
| Independent | Jag Sidhu | 7,629 | 4.35 |
| Independent | Preet S. Rai | 7,309 | 4.17 |
| Independent | Shirley Wilson | 6,634 | 3.79 |
| Independent | Doris Woodman-McMillan | 6,487 | 3.70 |
| Independent | Joel Madsen | 6,259 | 3.57 |
| Independent | Rupi Kanda-Rajwan | 5,592 | 3.19 |
| Independent | Dao Tran | 4,522 | 2.58 |
| Independent | Jeremy Klix | 2,692 | 1.54 |
| Independent | Thomas Votik | 993 | 0.57 |
| Turnout | | 31,757 | 30.42 |

== Armstrong ==
The results in Armstrong were as follows:

=== Mayoral election ===
The results for mayor of Armstrong:

| Mayoral candidate | Vote | % |
|---|---|---|
| **Chris Pieper †** | **726** | **45.6** |
| John Trainor | 469 | 29.5 |
| Joe Cramer (X) | 222 | 13.9 |
| Garhen Avalokiteshvara | 151 | 9.5 |

=== Armstrong City Council ===
The results for Armstrong city council were as follows:

Top 6 candidates elected

| Council candidate | Vote | % of ballots |
|---|---|---|
| **Kristy McLennan †** | **887** | **55.7** |
| **Jessie Valstar (X) †** | **749** | **47.0** |
| **Bradly Bourgeois †** | **627** | **39.4** |
| **Paul Britton †** | **599** | **37.6** |
| **Shirley Fowler (X) †** | **564** | **35.4** |
| **Ray Baylis †** | **493** | **31.0** |
| Mark Wehner (X) | 491 | 30.8 |
| Lyle Williamson | 466 | 29.3 |
| Mark Casson | 456 | 28.6 |
| Mike Babott | 440 | 27.6 |
| Steven Drapala (X) | 440 | 27.6 |
| Stephen Zopf | 437 | 27.4 |
| Neil Todd (X) | 411 | 25.8 |
| Andy Werner | 320 | 20.1 |
| Kim Sinclair | 304 | 19.1 |
| Dale Bradley | 271 | 17.0 |
| Turnout | | |

== Bulkley-Nechako A (Smithers Rural) Electoral Area ==
The results in Regional District of Bulkley-Nechako Electoral Area A (Smithers Rural) were as follows:

== Burnaby ==
2026 Burnaby municipal election

8 seats on Burnaby City Council + 1 mayor (5 seats needed for majority)
- Turnout: 29.23%
- Mayoral election
| Candidate | Mike Hurley | Heymann Yip | Hanzhi Wang |
| Party | Independent | Burnaby First | Independent |
| Popular vote | 28,946 | 9,250 | 3,345 |
| Percentage | 58.43% | 18.67% | 6.75% |
| Candidate | Bill Petrovas | Michael Angelo |
| Party | Independent | Independent |
| Popular vote | 3,221 | 2,550 |
| Percentage | 6.50% | 5.15% |
Mayor before election
Mike Hurley
Independent
Elected mayor
Mike Hurley
Independent
- City council election
| Party | Seats | +/– |
|---|---|---|
| Burnaby Citizens Association | 7 | +1 |
| New Burnaby | 1 | +1 |
This lists parties that won seats. See the complete results below.

=== Mayoral election ===
The results for mayor of Burnaby were as follows:

| Party | Mayoral candidate | Votes | % |
|---|---|---|---|
| Independent | **Mike Hurley** (X) † | 28,946 | 58.43 |
| Burnaby First | Heymann Yip | 9,250 | 18.67 |
| Independent | Hanzhi Wang | 3,345 | 6.75 |
| Independent | Bill Petrovas | 3,221 | 6.50 |
| Independent | Michael Angelo A_BC Robinhood | 2,550 | 5.15 |
| Independent | Sabina Hsu | 2,224 | 4.49 |

=== Burnaby City Council election ===
The results for Burnaby City Council were as follows:

Top 8 candidates elected

| Party | Council candidate | Votes | % |
|---|---|---|---|
| **Burnaby Citizens Association** | **Joe Keithley** (X) † | **18,073** | **5.51** |
| **Burnaby Citizens Association** | **Cindy Lee** † | **17,429** | **5.32** |
| **Burnaby Citizens Association** | **Ryan Erwin** † | **16,456** | **5.02** |
| **Burnaby Citizens Association** | **Maita Santiago** (X) † | **16,292** | **4.97** |
| **Burnaby Citizens Association** | **Daniel Tetrault** (X) † | **15,288** | **4.66** |
| **Burnaby Citizens Association** | **James Wang** † | **15,058** | **4.59** |
| **New Burnaby** | **Richard T. Lee** (X) † | **13,257** | **4.04** |
| **Burnaby Citizens Association** | **Kiran Singh** † | **13,209** | **4.03** |
| Independent | Allen Chen | 12,029 | 3.67 |
| Burnaby Citizens Association | Rea Park | 11,812 | 3.60 |
| Burnaby First | Daniel Chen | 10,864 | 3.31 |
| Green | Joel Gibbs | 9,506 | 2.90 |
| Green | Carrie McLaren | 8,824 | 2.69 |
| Green | Martin Kendell | 8,476 | 2.59 |
| Burnaby First | Fiorella Ravelli | 7,862 | 2.40 |
| Restore Burnaby | Rocky Dong | 7,738 | 2.36 |
| Green | Tara Shushtarian | 7,501 | 2.29 |
| New Burnaby | Sabrina Yang | 7,331 | 2.24 |
| Restore Burnaby | Jessica Cai | 7,329 | 2.24 |
| Restore Burnaby | Neil Chapman | 7,302 | 2.23 |
| Restore Burnaby | Tina Fiorda | 7,245 | 2.21 |
| New Burnaby | Avtar Dhinsa | 6,854 | 2.09 |
| Restore Burnaby | Daniel Cheung | 6,757 | 2.06 |
| Restore Burnaby | Janet Poon | 6,707 | 2.05 |
| New Burnaby | Neha Unadkat | 6,296 | 1.92 |
| New Burnaby | Morgan Nicholsfigueiredo | 5,889 | 1.80 |
| Burnaby First | Mary Blanca Villa y Battenberg | 5,724 | 1.75 |
| New Burnaby | David Xie | 5,598 | 1.71 |
| Independent | Larry Chin | 5,055 | 1.54 |
| Restore Burnaby | Ragina Naidu | 4,607 | 1.41 |
| Independent | Vincent Tong | 4,544 | 1.39 |
| Independent | Natalia Bember | 4,025 | 1.23 |
| Independent | Jason Martin | 3,949 | 1.20 |
| Independent | Lynette Hyerin Lee | 3,543 | 1.08 |
| Independent | Nash Milani | 3,401 | 1.04 |
| Independent | Philip Stojanovski | 3,156 | 0.96 |
| Independent | Garnet Heidt | 3,092 | 0.94 |
| Independent | Akmal Bazarov | 2,845 | 0.87 |
| Independent | Gulam Firdos | 1,911 | 0.58 |
| Independent | Darren Inouye | 1,877 | 0.57 |
| Independent | Tom Tao | 1,598 | 0.49 |
| Independent | Konstantine Roccas | 1,470 | 0.45 |
| Turnout | | | |

== Campbell River ==
The results in Campbell River were as follows:

=== Mayoral election ===
| Party | Mayoral candidate | Votes | % |
|---|---|---|---|
| Independent | **Kermit Dahl** (X) † | 5,171 | 56.1 |
| Independent | Gary Speck | 3,818 | 41.4 |

== Cariboo A (Red Bluff - Quesnel South) Electoral Area ==
The results in Cariboo Regional District Electoral Area A (Red Bluff - Quesnel South) were as follows:

== Cariboo G (Lac la Hache - 108 Mile Ranch) Electoral Area ==
The results in Cariboo Regional District Electoral Area G (Lac la Hache - 108 Mile Ranch) were as follows:

== Castlegar ==
The results in Castlegar were as follows:

== Central Kootenay H (The Slocan Valley) Electoral Area ==
The results in the Regional District of Central Kootenay Electoral Area H (The Slocan Valley) were as follows:

== Central Saanich ==
The results in Central Saanich were as follows:

== Chilliwack ==
=== Mayoral election ===
The results for mayor of Chilliwack were as follows:

| Party | Mayoral candidate | Votes | % |
|---|---|---|---|
| **Independent** | **Jason Lum** † | **15,525** | **82.33** |
| Conservative | Martina Rosini | 2,198 | 11.66 |
| Independent | Gary Raddysh | 872 | 4.62 |
| Independent | Farooque Syed | 262 | 1.39 |

=== Chilliwack City Council election ===
The results for Chilliwack City Council were as follows:

Top 6 candidates elected

| Council candidate | Vote | % |
|---|---|---|
| **Chris Kloot** (X) † | **11,675** | **11.98** |
| **Nicole Huitema-Read** (X) † | **10,513** | **10.79** |
| **Trevor McDonald** † | **8,223** | **8.44** |
| **Steve Czeck** † | **6,583** | **6.75** |
| **Kevin Baarda** † | **6,437** | **6.60** |
| **Sue Attrill-Knott** † | **6,385** | **6.55** |
| Leanna Kemp | 6,237 | 6.40 |
| Luke Zandeberg | 6,010 | 6.17 |
| Jared Mumford | 5,620 | 5.77 |
| Danielle Beausoleil | 4,081 | 4.19 |
| Brent Bowker | 4,006 | 4.11 |
| Zeeshan Khan | 3,922 | 4.02 |
| Raylene Mumford | 3,379 | 3.47 |
| Lisa Morry | 3,559 | 3.45 |
| Darren Blakeborough | 3,283 | 3.37 |
| Ghazaleh Nozamani | 2,853 | 2.93 |
| Daryl Moniz | 2,077 | 2.13 |
| Steve Just | 1,700 | 1.74 |
| Nilsana Charkhandeh | 1,122 | 1.15 |
| Turnout | | |

== Coldstream ==
The results in Coldstream were as follows:

== Columbia-Shuswap C (Eagle Bay, White Lake, Tappen, Sunnybrae) Electoral Area ==
The results in Columbia-Shuswap Regional District Electoral Area C (Eagle Bay, White Lake, Tappen, Sunnybrae) were as follows:

== Colwood ==
The results in Colwood were as follows:

=== Mayoral election ===
| Mayoral candidate | Vote | % |
|---|---|---|
| **Doug Kobayashi** (X) † | **4,250** | **78.5** |
| Rob Martin | 626 | 11.6 |
| Cynthia Day | 537 | 9.9 |

=== Colwood City Council Election ===
Top 6 candidates elected

| Council candidate | Vote | % of ballots |
|---|---|---|
| **Misty Olsen** (X) † | **3,864** | **70.2** |
| **Eugene Tseng** † | **3,615** | **65.7** |
| **Ian Ward** (X) † | **3,264** | **59.3** |
| **David Grove** (X) † | **3,232** | **58.7** |
| **Deborah Law** † | **3,146** | **57.2** |
| **Harold Bloomenthal** † | **2,624** | **47.7** |
| Jennifer Parlee | 2,366 | 43.0 |
| Terrilynn Gee | 1,502 | 27.3 |
| Kim Jordison (X) | 1,416 | 25.7 |
| Turnout | | |

== Comox ==
The results in Comox were as follows:

== Comox Valley A (Baynes Sound-Denman/Hornby Islands) Electoral Area ==
The results in Comox Valley Regional District Electoral Area A (Baynes Sound-Denman/Hornby Islands) were as follows:

== Comox Valley B (Lazo North) Electoral Area ==
The results in Comox Valley Regional District Electoral Area B (Lazo North) were as follows:

== Comox Valley C (Puntledge - Black Creek) Electoral Area ==
The results in Comox Valley Regional District Electoral Area C (Puntledge - Black Creek) were as follows:

== Coquitlam ==
2026 Coquitlam municipal election
- Turnout: 24.42%
| Candidate | Craig Hodge | Trish Mandewo | Madhavee Inamdar |
| Popular vote | 15,654 | 7,309 | 2,895 |
| Percentage | 60.54% | 28.27% | 11.20% |
Mayor before election
Richard Stewart
Elected mayor
Craig Hodge

=== Mayoral election ===
The results for mayor of Coquitlam were as follows:

| Mayoral candidate | Vote | % |
|---|---|---|
| **Craig Hodge** † | **15,654** | **60.54** |
| Trish Mandewo | 7,309 | 28.27 |
| Madhavee Inamdar | 2,895 | 11.20 |

=== Coquitlam City Council election ===
The results for Coquitlam City Council were as follows:

Top 8 candidates elected

| Council candidate | Vote | % |
|---|---|---|
| **Matt Djonlic** (X) † | **15,905** | **9.78** |
| **Robert Mazzarolo** (X) † | **15,104** | **9.29** |
| **Steve Kim** (X) † | **15,062** | **9.26** |
| **Teri Towner** (X) † | **13,758** | **8.46** |
| **Matthew Sebastiani** † | **13,480** | **8.29** |
| **Harvey Su** † | **9,968** | **6.13** |
| **Rosalinda Thorleifson** † | **9,836** | **6.05** |
| **Benjamin Perry** † | **9,604** | **5.91** |
| Jane Thomsing | 9,303 | 5.72 |
| Geneviève Kyle-Lefebvre | 9,295 | 5.72 |
| Phillip Buchan | 7,365 | 4.53 |
| Lili Tran | 6,865 | 4.22 |
| Tali Campbell | 6,807 | 4.19 |
| Kash Tayal | 5,050 | 3.11 |
| Harry Warren | 3,885 | 2.39 |
| Ali Cina | 3,679 | 2.26 |
| Shereen Samimi | 2,685 | 1.65 |
| Behzad Abdi | 2,637 | 1.62 |
| Cameron McBryer | 1,566 | 0.96 |
| Habib Jamshidian | 749 | 0.46 |
| Turnout | | |

== Courtenay ==
The results in Courtenay were as follows:

== Cowichan Valley B (Shawnigan Lake) Electoral Area ==
The results in Cowichan Valley Regional District Electoral Area B (Shawnigan Lake) were as follows:

== Cowichan Valley C (Cobble Hill) Electoral Area ==
The results in Cowichan Valley Regional District Electoral Area C (Cobble Hill) were as follows:

== Cranbrook ==
The results in Cranbrook were as follows:

== Creston ==
The results in Creston were as follows:

== Dawson Creek ==
The results in Dawson Creek were as follows:

== Delta ==
2026 Delta municipal election
- 17 October 2026

1 mayor, 6 city councillors, and 7 school board trustees
- Turnout: 43.28%
- Mayoral election
| | D1st | 1D | A4D |
| Candidate | Melissa Granum | Dylan Kruger | George Harvie |
| Party | Delta First | One Delta | Achieving For Delta |
| Popular vote | 16,197 | 9,460 | 7,782 |
| Percentage | 48.44% | 28.29% | 23.27% |
mayor before election
George Harvie
Achieving For Delta
Elected mayor
Melissa Granum
Delta First
- City council election
| Party | Leader | Seats | +/– |
|---|---|---|---|
| Achieving For Delta | George Harvie | 1 | −5 |
| Delta First | Melissa Granum | 3 | +3 |
| One Delta | Dylan Kruger | 2 | +2 |
This lists parties that won seats. See the complete results below.

=== Mayoral election ===
The results for mayor Delta are follows:

| Party | Mayoral candidate | Votes | % |
|---|---|---|---|
| **Delta First** | **Melissa Granum** † | **16,197** | **48.44** |
| One Delta | Dylan Kruger | 9,460 | 28.29 |
| Achieving for Delta | George V. Harvie (X) | 7,782 | 23.27 |

=== Delta City Council election ===
The results for Delta City Council were as follows:

Top 6 candidates elected

| Party | Council candidate | Votes | % |
|---|---|---|---|
| **Achieving for Delta** | **Alicia Guichon** (X) † | **15,149** | **9.10** |
| **Delta First** | **Tammy Hansen** † | **14,413** | **8.66** |
| **Delta First** | **Alexander Fischer** † | **12,947** | **7.78** |
| **One Delta** | **Sylvia Bishop** † | **11,811** | **7.09** |
| **Delta First** | **Jat Puri** † | **11,756** | **7.06** |
| **One Delta** | **Daniel Boisvert** (X) † | **9,946** | **5.97** |
| One Delta | Sarah Gallop | 9,379 | 5.63 |
| One Delta | Rod Binder (X) | 8,912 | 5.35 |
| Achieving for Delta | Sonya Sangster | 8,541 | 5.13 |
| Achieving for Delta | Nick Kanakos | 8,337 | 5.01 |
| Achieving for Delta | Jessie Dosanjh (X) | 8,317 | 5.00 |
| One Delta | Jennifer Johal (X) | 8,292 | 4.98 |
| Achieving for Delta | Jennyfer Cassar | 7,532 | 4.52 |
| One Delta | Pawan Joshi | 6,389 | 3.84 |
| Achieving for Delta | Ikjot Sandhu-Sahota | 6,186 | 3.72 |
| Independent | Wendy Beck-Orlando | 4,748 | 2.85 |
| Independent | Ronn Dunnett | 4,573 | 2.75 |
| Independent | Brian White | 3,809 | 2.29 |
| Independent | Ron Wasik | 2,794 | 1.68 |
| Independent | Gillian McLeod | 2,659 | 1.60 |
| Turnout | | | |

== Duncan ==
The results in Duncan were as follows:

== East Kootenay C Electoral Area ==
The results in the Regional District of East Kootenay Electoral Area C were as follows:

== Esquimalt ==
The results in Esquimalt were as follows:

=== Mayoral election ===
| Mayoral candidate | Vote | % |
|---|---|---|
| **Duncan Cavens** † | **4,407** | **91.0** |
| David Gauthier | 434 | 9.0 |

=== Esquimalt Municipal Council Election ===
Top 6 candidates elected

| Council candidate | Vote | % of ballots |
|---|---|---|
| **Tim Morrison** (X) † | **3,294** | **66.7** |
| **Tara Todesco** † | **2,873** | **58.2** |
| **Meagan Brame** (X) † | **2,556** | **51.8** |
| **Andrea Boardman** (X) † | **2,480** | **50.2** |
| **Holly Courtright** † | **2,385** | **48.3** |
| **Meredith James** † | **2,384** | **48.3** |
| Kody Thomson | 2,095 | 42.4 |
| Dan Igaz | 1,718 | 34.8 |
| Bruce McIldoon | 1,384 | 28.0 |
| Robb Johnstone | 1,347 | 27.3 |
| Tyler Russell | 1,240 | 25.1 |
| Zach Mulder | 1,158 | 23.5 |
| Turnout | | |

== Fernie ==
The results in Fernie were as follows:

=== Mayoral election ===
| Mayoral candidate | Vote | % |
|---|---|---|
| **Harshan Ramadass** † | **1,524** | **56.1** |
| Kyle Hamilton | 1,194 | 43.9 |

== Fort St. John ==
=== Mayoral election ===
The results for mayor of Fort St. John were as follows:

| Mayoral candidate | Votes | % |
|---|---|---|
| **Trevor Bolin** † | **2,934** | **65.86** |
| Lilia Hansen (X) | 1,521 | 34.14 |

=== Fort St. John City Council election ===
The results for Fort St. John City Council were as follows:

Top 6 candidates elected

| Council candidate | Votes | % |
|---|---|---|
| **Gord Klassen** (X) † | **3,050** | **14.32** |
| **Sarah MacDougall** (X) † | **3,026** | **14.21** |
| **Jim Lequiere** (X) † | **2,618** | **12.30** |
| **Tony Zabinsky** (X) † | **2,538** | **11.92** |
| **Lucas Wuthrich** † | **2,443** | **11.47** |
| **Kevin Stigners** † | **2,163** | **10.16** |
| John Lambert | 1,502 | 7.05 |
| Jane Drew | 1,494 | 7.02 |
| Ovvian Hill | 1,355 | 6.36 |
| Avery Cox | 1,104 | 5.18 |
| Turnout | | |

== Gibsons ==
=== Mayoral election ===
The results for mayor of Gibsons were as follows:

| Mayoral candidate | Votes | % |
|---|---|---|
| **Silas White** (X) † | 1,444 | 79.5 |
| Des Delaney | 373 | 20.5 |

=== Gibsons Town Council election ===
The results for Gibsons Town Council were as follows:

Top 4 candidates elected

| Council candidate | Vote | % |
|---|---|---|
| **Annemarie De Andrade** (X) † | 1,072 | 58.0 |
| **Sara El Rayess** † | 1,016 | 54.9 |
| **Neil MacEachern** † | 1,006 | 54.4 |
| **David Croal** (X) † | 758 | 41.0 |
| Arthur Cullinan | 686 | 37.1 |
| Jäger Rosenberg | 506 | 27.4 |
| Tyler Dunn | 498 | 26.9 |
| Randy Johnston | 463 | 25.0 |
| Ashley Cornelson | 328 | 17.7 |
| Todd Hodgins | 175 | 9.5 |
| Turnout | 1,849 | 45.2 |

== Hope ==
The results in Hope were as follows:

== Islands Trust ==
The results across the Islands Trust were as follows:

== Juan de Fuca Electoral Area ==
The results in Capital Regional District Electoral Area H (Juan de Fuca) were as follows:

== Kamloops ==
=== Mayoral election ===
The results for mayor of Kamloops were as follows:

| Party | Mayoral candidate | Votes | % |
|---|---|---|---|
| **Independent** | **Mike O'Reilly** † | **13,235** | **44.15** |
| Pivot Kamloops | Nelly Dever | 6,969 | 23.25 |
| Independent | Ray Dhaliwal | 3,916 | 13.06 |
| Independent | Reid Hamer-Jackson (X) | 3,548 | 11.83 |
| Independent | Ivory Winston | 1,374 | 4.58 |
| Independent | Kris Lloyd-Middleton | 938 | 3.13 |

=== Kamloops City Council election ===
The results for Kamloops City Council were as follows:

Top 8 candidates elected

| Party | Mayoral candidate | Votes | % |
|---|---|---|---|
| **Independent** | **Rob Bertrand** † | **10,932** | **5.78** |
| **Independent** | **Jesse Ritcey** † | **10,424** | **5.51** |
| **Independent** | **Katie Neustaeter** (X) † | **10,266** | **5.42** |
| **Independent** | **Steve Bucher** † | **9,500** | **5.02** |
| **Independent** | **Christopher Mitra** † | **9,163** | **4.84** |
| **Independent** | **Margot Middleton** (X) † | **8,918** | **4.71** |
| **Independent** | **Kelly Hall** (X) † | **8,915** | **4.71** |
| **Pivot Kamloops** | **Randy Sunderman** † | **8,647** | **4.57** |
| Independent | Nancy Bepple (X) | 8,576 | 4.53 |
| Independent | Bryce Eberle | 8,069 | 4.26 |
| Pivot Kamloops | Dennis Giesbrecht | 7,725 | 4.08 |
| Independent | Stephen Karpuk (X) | 7,721 | 4.08 |
| Pivot Kamloops | Kathrine Blair-Wunderlich | 6,895 | 3.64 |
| Independent | Kadin Rainville | 6,840 | 3.61 |
| Independent | Dave Baker | 6,698 | 3.54 |
| Independent | Brian Andrews | 6,388 | 3.38 |
| Independent | Dale Bass (X) | 6,381 | 3.37 |
| Independent | Cindy Sonne | 6,107 | 3.23 |
| Independent | Bill Sarai (X) | 6,080 | 3.21 |
| Independent | Greg Unger | 6,009 | 3.18 |
| Independent | Doug Ronnquist | 5,065 | 2.68 |
| Independent | Nevin Webster | 3,913 | 2.07 |
| Independent | Bonnie Cleland | 3,361 | 1.78 |
| Independent | Lyndsay McDonald | 3,126 | 1.65 |
| Independent | Robin Reeb | 3,042 | 1.61 |
| Independent | Barbara Morin | 2,980 | 1.57 |
| Independent | Alberto De Marni | 2,808 | 1.48 |
| Independent | Mac B. Gordon | 2,712 | 1.43 |
| Independent | Ian Head | 1,996 | 1.05 |
| Turnout | | | |

== Kelowna ==
2026 Kelowna municipal election
| Candidate | Tom Dyas | Ron Cannan |
| Popular vote | 19,451 | 18,482 |
| Percentage | 50.54% | 48.02% |
Mayor before election
Tom Dyas
Elected mayor
Tom Dyas

=== Mayoral election ===
The results for mayor of Kelowna were as follows:

| Mayoral candidate | Vote | % |
|---|---|---|
| **Tom Dyas** (X) † | **19,451** | **50.54** |
| Ron Cannan | 18,482 | 48.02 |
| Andrew Uitvlugt | 556 | 1.44 |

==== Polling ====
| Polling firm | Dates | Ron Cannan | Tom Dyas | Tracy Gray | Gord Lovegrove | Loyal Wooldridge | Another candidate | Don't know/won't say |
|---|---|---|---|---|---|---|---|---|
| Pallas Data | 19–20 December 2025 | **25%** | 14% | —N/a | 5% | 7% | 7% | **42%** |
| Pallas Data | 19–20 December 2025 | —N/a | 17% | **30%** | 3% | 7% | 9% | **34%** |

=== Kelowna City Council election ===
The results for Kelowna City Council were as follows:

| Council Candidates | Vote | % of ballots |
|---|---|---|
| **Gord Lovegrove** (X) † | **15,462** | |
| **Davis Kyle** † | **14,822** | |
| **Kevin Kraft** † | **14,822** | |
| **Brady Rogers** † | **12,635** | |
| **Rick Webber** (X) † | **12,512** | |
| **Mohini Singh** (X) † | **11,968** | |
| **Laura Thurnheer** † | **11,949** | |
| **Les Bellamy** † | **11,470** | |
| Maxine DeHart (X) | 11,165 | |
| Indy Dhial | 11,033 | |
| Lee-Ann Tiede | 10,479 | |
| Nikki Renee Csek | 10,388 | |
| Crystal Dougan | 9,385 | |
| Trevor McAleese | 9,323 | |
| Susan Ames | 9,013 | |
| Julia Fraser | 8,729 | |
| Teresa May | 7,172 | |
| Chris Bocskei | 7,154 | |
| Todd Robert Sanderson | 5,690 | |
| Tim Down | 5,532 | |
| Doris Maria Bregolisse | 5,462 | |
| Bal Grewal | 5,415 | |
| Todd Christopher Daniels | 4,396 | |
| Hamid Khajavi | 3,521 | |
| Brian James Pinter | 3,219 | |
| Greg Dahms | 3,172 | |
| JC Rathwell | 2,946 | |
| Rob Wilkinson | 2,461 | |
| Daniel Gordon Fritter | 2,303 | |
| H. Morales | 1,579 | |
| Brian Rogers | 1,553 | |
| Corey Severin | 1,280 | |
| Randy Millis | 1,209 | |
| Mike Rose | 1,207 | |
| Glendon Charles Smedley | 1,085 | |
| Silverado Brooks Socrates | 767 | |
| King James III | 719 | |
| Turnout | | |

== Kent ==
The results in Kent were as follows:

== Kimberley ==
The results in Kimberley were as follows:

== Kitimat ==
The results in Kitimat were as follows:

== Ladysmith ==
The results in Ladysmith were as follows:

== Lake Country ==
The results in Lake Country were as follows:

== Langford ==
=== Mayoral election ===
The results for mayor of Langford were as follows:

| Mayoral candidate | Vote | % |
|---|---|---|
| **Stew Young** † | **9,801** | **64.4** |
| Scott Goodmanson (X) | 5,411 | 35.6 |

=== Langford City Council election ===
The results for Langford City Council were as follows:

Top 6 candidates elected

| Council candidate | Vote | % of ballots |
|---|---|---|
| **Lisa Foxall** † | **8,574** | **56.1** |
| **Wendy Hobbs** † | **7,720** | **50.5** |
| **Bryson Hill** † | **7,533** | **49.3** |
| **Jennifer Dunnett** † | **7,117** | **46.6** |
| **Brandy Gordon** † | **6,600** | **43.2** |
| **Colby Harder** (X) † | **6,082** | **39.8** |
| Mary Wagner (X) | 5,981 | 39.1 |
| Keith Yacucha (X) | 5,513 | 36.1 |
| Kimberley Guiry (X) | 5,033 | 32.9 |
| Tanya Sunshine | 4,966 | 32.5 |
| Matt Sahlstrom | 2,843 | 18.6 |
| Trevor Hinton | 2,328 | 15.2 |
| Shawn Blair | 1,772 | 11.6 |
| Michael Mortimore | 1,386 | 9.1 |
| Andrew Jackson | 1,132 | 7.4 |
| Alex McLeod | 772 | 5.1 |
| Turnout | | |

== Langley City ==
The results in Langley City were as follows:

=== Langley City Council election ===
The results for Langley City Council were as follows:

Top 8 candidates elected

== Langley Township ==
2026 Langley Township municipal election

8 seats on Langley Township Council + 1 mayor (5 seats needed for majority)
- Turnout: 31.55%
- Mayoral election
| Candidate | Jay Lundgren | Eric Woodward |
| Party | Langley Strong | Progress for Langley |
| Popular vote | 18,302 | 15,459 |
| Percentage | 54.21% | 45.79% |
mayor before election
Eric Woodward
Progress for Langley
Elected mayor
Jay Lundgren
Langley Strong
- City council election
| Party | Seats | +/– |
|---|---|---|
| Langley Strong | 7 | +7 |
| Progress for Langley | 2 | −4 |
This lists parties that won seats. See the complete results below.

=== Mayoral election ===
The results for mayor of Langley Township were as follows:

| Party | Mayoral candidate | Votes | % |
|---|---|---|---|
| **Langley Strong** | **Jay Lundgren** † | **18,302** | **54.21** |
| Progress for Langley | Eric Woodward (X) | 15,459 | 45.79 |

=== Langley District Council election ===
The results for Langley District Council were as follows:

Top 8 candidates elected

| Party | Mayoral candidate | Votes | % |
|---|---|---|---|
| **Langley Strong** | **Margaret Kunst** (X) † | **17,338** | **7.55** |
| **Langley Strong** | **Bob Martens** (X) † | **16,641** | **7.25** |
| **Langley Strong** | **Blair Whitmarsh** (X) † | **16,501** | **7.19** |
| **Langley Strong** | **Kim Richter** (X) † | **16,280** | **7.09** |
| **Langley Strong** | **Teresa Townsley** † | **15,251** | **6.64** |
| **Langley Strong** | **Lauren Chalus** † | **14,650** | **6.38** |
| **Progress for Langley** | **Michael V. Pratt** (X) † | **12,872** | **5.61** |
| **Progress for Langley** | **Steve Ferguson** (X) † | **12,044** | **5.25** |
| Progress for Langley | June Park | 11,827 | 5.15 |
| Progress for Langley | Michele St. Germain | 11,586 | 5.05 |
| Progress for Langley | Tim Baillie (X) | 11,430 | 4.98 |
| Progress for Langley | Rob Rindt (X) | 11,415 | 4.97 |
| Progress for Langley | Tess Rouse | 11,052 | 4.82 |
| Langley Strong | Shumail Javed | 10,186 | 4.44 |
| Independent | Andy Shen | 8,897 | 3.88 |
| Progress for Langley | Sarb Rai | 8,721 | 3.80 |
| Independent | Mike Parker | 7,257 | 3.16 |
| Independent | Leith White | 7,056 | 3.07 |
| Independent | Benjamin Neff | 4,946 | 2.15 |
| Independent | Resha Sabti | 3,580 | 1.56 |
| Turnout | | | |

== Maple Ridge ==
=== Mayoral election ===
The results for mayor of Maple Ridge were as follows:

| Party | Mayoral candidate | Votes | % |
|---|---|---|---|
| **Independent** | **Jerry Kok** † | **12,347** | **58.02** |
| A Better Maple Ridge | Dan Ruimy (X) | 8,932 | 41.98 |

=== Maple Ridge City Council election ===
The results for Maple Ridge City Council were as follows:

Top 6 candidates elected

| Party | Council candidate | Votes | % |
|---|---|---|---|
| **Independent** | **Judy Dueck** (X) † | **9,418** | **9.00** |
| **Independent** | **Chelsa Meadus** † | **9,403** | **8.98** |
| **A Better Maple Ridge** | **Bob D'Eith** † | **8,763** | **8.37** |
| **Independent** | **Mike Morden** † | **8,323** | **7.95** |
| **A Better Maple Ridge** | **Korleen Carreras** (X) † | **7,387** | **7.06** |
| **Independent** | **Andrew Laity** † | **7,371** | **7.04** |
| A Better Maple Ridge | Leanne Koehn | 7,116 | 6.80 |
| Independent | Inya Mitrovic | 6,894 | 6.59 |
| Independent | Ryan Svendsen | 6,877 | 6.57 |
| Independent | Kristina Brown | 6,077 | 5.81 |
| A Better Maple Ridge | Bhupinder Johar | 6,075 | 5.80 |
| Independent | Cindy-Lea Stephenson | 5,111 | 4.88 |
| Independent | Ken Holland | 4,519 | 4,32 |
| Independent | Lou Jose | 4,441 | 4.24 |
| Independent | Steven Muise | 4,080 | 3.90 |
| Independent | Leah Campbell | 2,809 | 2.68 |
| Turnout | | | |

== Merritt ==
The results in Merritt were as follows:

== Metchosin ==
The results in Metchosin were as follows:

=== Mayoral election ===
| Mayoral candidate | Vote | % |
|---|---|---|
| **Steve Gray** † | **1,724** | **77.4** |
| Marie-Térèse Little (X) | 434 | 19.5 |
| Shawn Melinchuk | 68 | 3.1 |

=== Metchosin Council Election ===
Top 4 candidates elected

| Council candidate | Vote | % of ballots |
|---|---|---|
| **Kyara Kahakauwila** † | **1,563** | **69.8** |
| **Jesse Pewarchuk** † | **1,487** | **66.4** |
| **Shelly Donaldson** (X) † | **1,384** | **61.8** |
| **Mark Muldoon** † | **1,294** | **57.8** |
| Eric White | 829 | 37.0 |
| Ellen Frisch | 795 | 35.5 |
| Mattie McMillan | 317 | 14.2 |
| Turnout | | |

== Metro Vancouver Electoral Area A ==
The results in Metro Vancouver Electoral Area A were as follows:

=== Director election ===
| Mayoral candidate | Vote | % |
|---|---|---|
| **David Hocking** | **Acclaimed** | |

== Mission ==
=== Mayoral election ===
The results for mayor of Mission were as follows:

| Mayoral candidate | Vote | % |
|---|---|---|
| **Jag Gill** † | **Acclaimed** | |

=== Mission City Council election ===
The results for Mission City Council were as follows:

Top 6 candidates elected

== Nanaimo ==
=== Mayoral election ===
The results for mayor of Nanaimo were as follows:

| Party | Mayoral candidate | Votes | % |
|---|---|---|---|
| **Independent** | **Leonard Krog** (X) † | **10,368** | **41.08** |
| Independent | Sarah Lovegrove | 8,461 | 33.52 |
| REAL | Anne Marie Dryden | 6,084 | 24.10 |
| Independent | Brunie Brunie | 327 | 1.30 |

=== Nanaimo City Council election ===
The results for Nanaimo City Council were as follows:

Top 8 candidates elected

| Party | Council candidate | Votes | % of vote | % of ballots |
|---|---|---|---|---|
| **Independent** | **Ben Geselbracht** (X) † | **12,399** | **7.25** | **48.7** |
| **Independent** | **Paul Manly** (X) † | **12,052** | **7.04** | **47.4** |
| **Independent** | **Hilary Eastmure** (X) † | **10,660** | **6.23** | **41.9** |
| **Independent** | **Sheryl Armstrong** (X) † | **9,368** | **5.48** | **36.8** |
| **Independent** | **Andréa Coutu** † | **8,160** | **4.77** | **32.1** |
| **Independent** | **Erin Hemmens** (X) † | **8,090** | **4.73** | **31.8** |
| **Independent** | **Marnie Boers** † | **7,873** | **4.60** | **30.9** |
| **Independent** | **Ian Thorpe** (X) † | **7,654** | **4.47** | **30.1** |
| Independent | Janice Perrino (X) | 6,263 | 3.66 | 24.6 |
| Independent | Sandy Bartlett | 6,174 | 3.61 | 24.3 |
| Independent | Paul Chapman | 6,018 | 3.52 | 23.6 |
| Independent | Jeff Annesley | 4,927 | 2.88 | 19.4 |
| REAL | Bryan Gordon | 4,730 | 2.76 | 18.6 |
| REAL | Derek Hanna | 4,229 | 2.47 | 16.6 |
| REAL | Malcolm Cooke | 4,223 | 2.47 | 16.6 |
| Independent | Meg Fyfe Watkins | 4,208 | 2.46 | 16.5 |
| REAL | Frank Pluta | 4,096 | 2.39 | 16.1 |
| REAL | Joe Figel | 4,093 | 2.39 | 16.1 |
| Independent | Matthew Miller | 3,826 | 2.24 | 15.0 |
| Independent | Zaki Mohammed | 3,815 | 2.23 | 15.0 |
| Independent | Andrew Merilees | 3,584 | 2.09 | 14.1 |
| Independent | Jackie Bolen | 3,195 | 1.87 | 12.6 |
| Independent | Richard Harlow | 3,181 | 1.86 | 12.5 |
| Independent | Paul Van Ryssel | 3,098 | 1.81 | 12.2 |
| Independent | Cameron Leckenby | 3,001 | 1.75 | 11.8 |
| Independent | Bill McKay | 2,789 | 1.63 | 11.0 |
| Independent | Steven Johns | 2,343 | 1.37 | 9.2 |
| Independent | Angela Waldick | 2,336 | 1.37 | 9.2 |
| Independent | Patrick Gunville | 2,168 | 1.27 | 8.5 |
| Independent | Mark Chandler | 2,159 | 1.26 | 8.5 |
| Independent | Austin Seng | 1,829 | 1.07 | 7.2 |
| Independent | Max MacKay | 1,590 | 0.93 | 6.2 |
| Independent | Ryan Djakovic | 1,222 | 0.71 | 4.8 |
| Independent | Ken Bennett | 1,215 | 0.71 | 4.8 |
| Independent | Rod Moreno | 1,124 | 0.66 | 4.4 |
| Independent | Bryant Marshall | 1,051 | 0.61 | 4.1 |
| Independent | Shane Crawley | 929 | 0.54 | 3.7 |
| Independent | Anita Greer | 701 | 0.41 | 2.8 |
| Independent | Holden Southward | 410 | 0.24 | 1.6 |
| Independent | Rob Phelan | 294 | 0.17 | 1.2 |
| Turnout | | | | |

== Nanaimo A (South Wellington, Cassidy, Cedar) Electoral Area ==
The results in the Regional District of Nanaimo Electoral Area A (South Wellington, Cassidy, Cedar) were as follows:

== Nanaimo Regional District E (Nanoose) Electoral Area ==
The results in the Regional District of Nanaimo Electoral Area E (Nanoose) were as follows:

== Nanaimo F (Coombs, Hilliers, Errington) Electoral Area ==
The results in the Regional District of Nanaimo Electoral Area F (Coombs, Hilliers, Errington) were as follows:

== Nanaimo G (Dashwood, Englishman River, French Creek) Electoral Area ==
The results in the Regional District of Nanaimo Electoral Area G (Dashwood, Englishman River, French Creek) were as follows:

== Nelson ==
The results in Nelson were as follows:

== New Westminster ==
2026 New Westminster municipal election
- 17 October 2026

1 mayor, 6 city councillors, and 7 school board trustees
- Mayoral election
| | NWP | CFNW |
| Candidate | Daniel Fontaine | Patrick Johnstone |
| Party | Progressives | Community First |
| Seat | Councillor | Mayor |
| Popular vote | 12,361 | 10,128 |
| Percentage | 54.96 | 45.04% |
Mayor before election
Patrick Johnstone
Community First
Mayor-elect after election
Daniel Fontaine
Progressives
- City council election
| Party | Seats | +/– |
|---|---|---|
| New West Progressives | 5 | +3 |
| Community First New West | 1 | −3 |
This lists parties that won seats. See the complete results below.
- School board election
| Party | Seats | +/– |
|---|---|---|
| New West Progressives | 6 | +5 |
| Community First New West | 1 | −5 |
This lists parties that won seats. See the complete results below.

=== Mayoral election ===
The results for mayor of New Westminster were as follows:

2026 New Westminster municipal election: Mayor
** Preliminary results — Not yet official **
| Party | Candidate | Votes | % | Elected |
|---|---|---|---|---|
| New West Progressives | Daniel Fontaine | 12,361 | 54.96 | ✓ |
| Community First New West | Patrick Johnstone (X) | 10,128 | 45.04 | |
| Total valid votes | | 22,489 | | |
| Total rejected ballots | | | | |
| Turnout | | | | |
Note: (X) indicates the incumbent mayor

=== New Westminster City Council election ===
The results for New Westminster City Council were as follows:

Top 6 candidates elected

2026 New Westminster municipal election: City council
** Preliminary results — Not yet official **
| Party | Candidate | Votes | % of votes | % of ballots | ±% | Elected |
|---|---|---|---|---|---|---|
| New West Progressives | **Ken Armstrong** † | 11,607 | 9.51 | 51.2 | – | ✓ |
| Community First New West | **Tasha Henderson** (X) † | 10,877 | 8.91 | 48.0 | -0.4 | ✓ |
| New West Progressives | **Paul Minhas** (X) † | 10,847 | 8.88 | 47.8 | +2.3 | ✓ |
| New West Progressives | **Rick Folka** † | 10,393 | 8.51 | 45.8 | +6.34 | ✓ |
| New West Progressives | **Maryann Morrison** † | 10,340 | 8.47 | 45.6 | – | ✓ |
| New West Progressives | **Karima Budhwani** † | 9,770 | 8.00 | 43.1 | – | ✓ |
| New West Progressives | Ray Porcellato | 9,738 | 7.97 | 42.9 | – | |
| Community First New West | Jaimie McEvoy (X) | 9,529 | 7.80 | 42.0 | -7.8 | |
| Community First New West | Peter Jorgensen | 9,284 | 7.60 | 40.9 | – | |
| Community First New West | Kane Tse | 8,763 | 7.18 | 38.6 | – | |
| Community First New West | Dalia Al-Hussaini | 8,760 | 7.17 | 38.6 | – | |
| Community First New West | Bereket Kebede | 8,042 | 6.59 | 35.5 | -0.8 | |
| Independent | Geoff Homel | 4,160 | 3.41 | 18.3 | – | |
| Turnout | | 22,674 | 33.0 | +5.7 | | |
| Estimated eligible voters | | 68,635 | | | | |
Note: (X) indicates an incumbent city councillor

== North Cowichan ==
The results in North Cowichan were as follows:

== North Saanich ==
The results in North Saanich were as follows:

== North Vancouver City ==
=== Mayoral election ===
The results for mayor of the City of North Vancouver were as follows:

| Mayoral candidate | Vote | % |
|---|---|---|
| Linda Buchanan (X) | | |
| Oliver King | | |
| Dave Kurvers | | |
| Mike McGraw | | |

=== North Vancouver City Council election ===
The results for North Vancouver City Council were as follows:

Top 6 candidates elected

== North Vancouver District ==
=== Mayoral election ===
The results for mayor of North Vancouver District were as follows:

| Mayoral candidate | Vote | % |
|---|---|---|
| **Mike Little** (X) † | **10,431** | **51.41** |
| Stephan Nieweler | 6,145 | 30.29 |
| Max Zahedi | 1,934 | 9.53 |
| Graham Alexander | 1,583 | 7.80 |
| Paolo Pucci | 196 | 0.97 |

=== North Vancouver District Council election ===
The results for North Vancouver District Council were as follows:

Top 6 candidates elected

| Council candidate | Vote | % |
|---|---|---|
| **Catherine Pope** (X) † | **10,433** | **10.10** |
| **Lisa Muri** (X) † | **10,008** | **9.69** |
| **Jordan Back** (X) † | **9,643** | **9.33** |
| **Jim Hanson** (X) † | **8,758** | **8.48** |
| **Mathew Bond** † | **8,378** | **8.11** |
| **Daniel Anderson** † | **8,233** | **7.97** |
| Linda Munro | 8,139 | 7.88 |
| Trey Bell | 7,151 | 6.92 |
| Herman Mah (X) | 6,501 | 6.29 |
| Kulvir Mann | 6,427 | 6.22 |
| Aidan Kyle | 5,538 | 5.36 |
| Betty Forbes (X) | 4,142 | 4.01 |
| Stephanie Wilson | 3,966 | 3.84 |
| Victoria Nwabuisi | 3,515 | 3.40 |
| Daina Boyd | 2,492 | 2.41 |
| Turnout | | |

== Oak Bay ==
The results in Oak Bay were as follows:

=== Mayoral election ===
| Mayoral candidate | Vote | % |
|---|---|---|
| **Kevin Murdoch** (X) † | **5,231** | **75.2** |
| Sam Holland | 1,725 | 24.8 |

=== Esquimalt Municipal Council Election ===
Top 6 candidates elected

| Council candidate | Vote | % of ballots |
|---|---|---|
| **Hazel Braithwaite** (X) † | **5,095** | **72.1** |
| **Will Moore** † | **4,715** | **66.7** |
| **Cairine Green** (X) † | **4,357** | **61.7** |
| **Roxanne Helme** † | **4,101** | **58.0** |
| **Esther Paterson** (X) † | **3,928** | **55.6** |
| **David Gleeson** † | **3,399** | **48.1** |
| Karin Sweeney | 2,933 | 41.5 |
| Sarah Starkweather | 2,307 | 32.6 |
| Katerina Weller | 1,940 | 27.5 |
| Turnout | | |

== Regional District of Okanagan-Similkameen ==
=== Electoral Area A ===
The results Regional District of Okanagan-Similkameen Electoral Area A (Osoyoos Rural) were as follows:

==== Director election ====
| Director candidate | Vote | % |
|---|---|---|
| Jamie Bradford | 114 | 29.9% |
| **Mark Pendergraft** (X) † | 267 | 70% |

=== Electoral Area B ===
The results Regional District of Okanagan-Similkameen Electoral Area B (Cawston) were as follows:

==== Director election ====
| Director candidate | Vote | % |
|---|---|---|
| **George Dickson Bush** (X) † | 181 | 57.4% |
| Clayton Hillman | 134 | 42.5% |

=== Electoral Area C ===
The results Regional District of Okanagan-Similkameen Electoral Area C (Oliver Rural) were as follows:

==== Director election ====
| Director candidate | Vote | % |
|---|---|---|
| **Mark Mattes** † | Acclaimed | |

=== Electoral Area D ===
The results Regional District of Okanagan-Similkameen Electoral Area D (Okanagan Falls Rural) were as follows:

==== Director election ====
| Director candidate | Vote | % |
|---|---|---|
| **Kandis Lipsett** † | Acclaimed | |

=== Electoral Area E ===
The results Regional District of Okanagan-Similkameen Electoral Area E (Naramata Rural) were as follows:

==== Director election ====
| Director candidate | Vote | % |
|---|---|---|
| **Rob Bilyk** † | 601 | 78.1% |
| Adrienne Fedrigo (X) | 61 | 7.9% |
| Anita Molaro | 107 | 13.9 |

=== Electoral Area F ===
The results Regional District of Okanagan-Similkameen Electoral Area F (Summerland Rural) were as follows:

==== Director election ====
| Director candidate | Vote | % |
|---|---|---|
| Jason Earl | 225 | 39.1% |
| **John Rousseau** † | 349 | 60.8% |

=== Electoral Area G ===
The results Regional District of Okanagan-Similkameen Electoral Area G (Keremeos Rural) were as follows:

==== Director election ====
| Director candidate | Vote | % |
|---|---|---|
| **Tim Roberts** (X) † | Acclaimed | |

=== Electoral Area H ===
The results Regional District of Okanagan-Similkameen Electoral Area H (Princeton Rural) were as follows:

==== Director election ====
| Director candidate | Vote | % |
|---|---|---|
| Sandy Schroeder | 127 | 24.3% |
| **Shelby Smith** † | 394 | 75.6% |

=== Electoral Area I ===
The results Regional District of Okanagan-Similkameen Electoral Area I (Kaleden Rural) were as follows:

==== Director election ====
| Director candidate | Vote | % |
|---|---|---|
| Cheryl Halla | 200 | 46.1% |
| **Henry Sielmann** † | 233 | 53.8% |

== Oliver ==
The results in Oliver were as follows:

== Osoyoos ==
The results in Osoyoos were as follows:

== Parksville ==
The results in Parksville were as follows:

== Peace River B Electoral Area ==
The results in the Peace River Regional District Electoral Area B were as follows:

== Peace River C Electoral Area ==
The results in the Peace River Regional District Electoral Area C were as follows:

== Peachland ==
The results in Peachland were as follows:

== Penticton ==
The results in Penticton were as follows:

== Pitt Meadows ==
The results in Pitt Meadows were as follows:

=== Pitt Meadows City Council election ===
Top 6 candidates elected

== Port Alberni ==
=== Mayoral election ===
| Mayoral candidate | Vote | % |
|---|---|---|
| **Charles Mealey** † | **3,075** | **52.2** |
| Sharie Minions (X) | 2,112 | 35.8 |
| Todd Patola | 245 | 4.2 |
| Don Davidson | 181 | 3.1 |
| Sukhdev Krishan | 162 | 2.7 |
| Don Tecson | 96 | 1.6 |

=== Port Alberni City Council Election ===
Top 6 candidates elected

| Council candidate | Vote | % of ballots |
|---|---|---|
| **Diljeet S. Hundal** † | **3,145** | **53.4** |
| **Cindy Solda** (X) † | **2,986** | **50.7** |
| **Debbie Haggard** (X) † | **2,688** | **45.6** |
| **Sam Atwal** † | **2,659** | **45.1** |
| **Adam Hayduk** † | **2,594** | **44.0** |
| **Nina Kossenko** † | **2,174** | **36.9** |
| Michael Moore | 1,846 | 31.3 |
| Wendy Lee Kurr | 1,821 | 30.9 |
| Chris Washington | 1,629 | 27.6 |
| Anna Perry | 1,525 | 25.9 |
| Richard Jae Huneault | 1,317 | 22.3 |
| Tom Verbrugge (X) | 1,104 | 18.7 |
| Turnout | | |

== Port Coquitlam ==
=== Mayoral election ===
The results for mayor of Port Coquitlam were as follows:

| Mayoral candidate | Votes | % |
|---|---|---|
| Brad West (X) | | |
| Connor Fesenmaier | | |
| Pasquale Zampieri | | |

=== Port Coquitlam City Council election ===
The results for Port Coquitlam City Council were as follows:

Top 6 candidates elected

== Port Moody ==
The results in Port Moody were as follows:

=== Port Moody City Council election ===
The results for Port Moody City Council were as follows:

Top 6 candidates elected

== Powell River ==
The results in Powell River were as follows:

== Prince George ==
=== Mayoral election ===
The results for mayor of Prince George were as follows:

| Mayoral candidate | Vote | % |
|---|---|---|
| Ernesto Caranto | | |
| Marc Carrier | | |
| Randy Danchuk | | |
| Garth Frizzell | | |
| Keenan Murphy | | |
| Zachariah Olson | | |
| Kyle Sampson | | |
| Roy Stewart | | |
| Simon Yu (X) | | |
| Turnout | | |

=== Prince George City Council election ===
The results for Prince George City Council were as follows:

Top 8 candidates elected

== Prince Rupert ==
The results in Prince Rupert were as follows:

== Qualicum Beach ==
The results in Qualicum Beach were as follows:

== Quesnel ==
The results in Quesnel were as follows:

== Revelstoke ==
The results in Revelstoke were as follows:

== Richmond ==
=== Mayoral election ===
2026 Richmond municipal election

8 seats on Richmond City Council + 1 mayor (5 seats needed for majority)
- Mayoral election
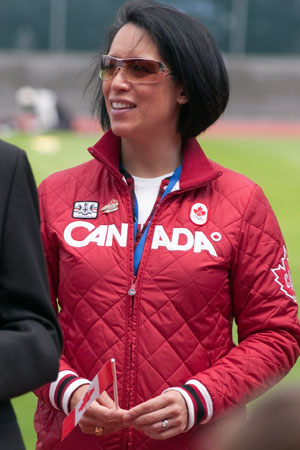

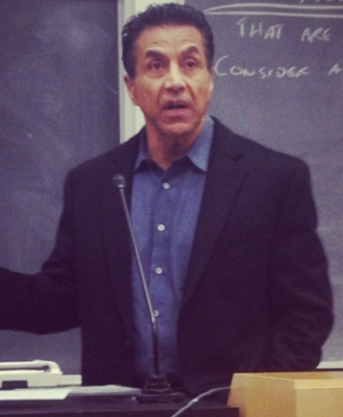
| | First party | Second party |
|---|---|---|
| | RF |
| Candidate | Rob Howard | Alexa Loo |
| Party | Richmond Forward | Richmond Strong |
| Leader's seat | N/A | City Council |
| Popular vote | 19,676 | 18,796 |
| Percentage | 34.45% | 32.91% |
| | Third party | Fourth party |
| | | WAR |
| Candidate | Kash Heed | Dickens Cheung |
| Party | Independent | We Are Richmond |
| Leader's seat | City Council |
| Popular vote | 11,111 | 5,876 |
| Percentage | 19.46 | 10.29% |
Mayor before election
Malcolm Brodie
Independent
Elected mayor
Rob Howard
Richmond Forward
- City council election
| Party | Seats | +/– |
|---|---|---|
| RITE Richmond | 3 | 0 |
| Common Sense | 1 | +1 |
| Richmond United | 1 | +1 |
| Richmond Forward | 1 | +1 |
| Advance Richmond | 3 | +3 |
This lists parties that won seats. See the complete results below.

The results for mayor of Richmond were as follows:

| Party | Mayoral candidate | Votes | % |
|---|---|---|---|
| **Richmond Forward** | **Rob Howard** † | **19,676** | **34.45** |
| Richmond Strong | Alexa Loo | 18,796 | 32.91 |
| Independent | Kash Heed | 11,111 | 19.46 |
| We Are Richmond | Dickens Cheung | 5,876 | 10.29 |
| Action Richmond | Mei Kang | 755 | 1.32 |
| Independent | Dennet "The cat guy" Lee | 627 | 1.10 |
| Independent | Goldentiger King | 266 | 0.47 |

==== Polling ====
| Polling firm | Dates | Cheung | Heed | Howard | Kang | Lee | Loo | Starrett | Undecided/would not vote |
|---|---|---|---|---|---|---|---|---|---|
| Léger | 23–30 Sept 2026 | 4% | **13%** | 11% | — | 4% | 12% | — | **50%** |
| Pallas Data | 24–28 June 2026 | 2% | **20%** | 6% | 4% | — | 8% | 11% | **48%** |

=== Richmond City Council election ===
The results for Richmond City Council were as follows:

Top 8 candidates elected

| Party | Council candidate | Votes | % |
|---|---|---|---|
| **Advance Richmond** | **Gary Law** † | **15,759** | **4.34** |
| **RITE Richmond** | **Carol Day** (X) † | **15,552** | **4.29** |
| **RITE Richmond** | **Michael Wolfe** (X) † | **14,315** | **3.95** |
| **Advance Richmond** | **Sheldon Starrett** † | **13,576** | **3.74** |
| **RITE Richmond** | **Laura Gillanders** (X) † | **13,122** | **3.62** |
| **Common Sense** | **Kenny Chiu** † | **13,119** | **3.62** |
| **Richmond United** | **Andy Hobbs** (X) † | **12,985** | **3.58** |
| **Advance Richmond** | **Kevin Lai** † | **12,006** | **3.31** |
| Richmond Strong | Bob Basanti | 11,758 | 3.24 |
| Advance Richmond | Sam Wang | 11,709 | 3.23 |
| Advance Richmond | Grace Tsang | 10,254 | 2.83 |
| Common Sense | Thomas Leung | 9,132 | 2.52 |
| RITE Richmond | Jerome Dickey | 9,017 | 2.49 |
| Richmond Strong | Jeff Jiang | 8,532 | 2.35 |
| Richmond Strong | Karen Novorr-Pezzuto | 8,489 | 2.34 |
| Conservative | Lisa Phillips | 8,215 | 2.26 |
| Advance Richmond | Wallace Pong | 8,195 | 2.26 |
| Advance Richmond | Jizhou William Wang | 8,173 | 2.25 |
| Richmond Forward | Shelley Leonhardt | 7,969 | 2.20 |
| Richmond Forward | Howard Jampolsky | 7,679 | 2.12 |
| Richmond Forward | Romeo Bicego | 7,536 | 2.08 |
| Richmond Forward | Eric Yung | 7,511 | 2.07 |
| Richmond Forward | Melissa Zhang | 7,311 | 2.02 |
| Richmond United | Mike Gill | 7,274 | 2.01 |
| Richmond Citizens | Milly Yee | 6,885 | 1.90 |
| Independent | Jessy Dhillon | 6,668 | 1.84 |
| We Are Richmond | Jack Chen | 6,600 | 1.82 |
| Common Sense | Glenda Strang | 6,485 | 1.79 |
| Richmond Citizens | Keefer Pelech | 6,451 | 1.78 |
| Richmond Citizens | Vincent Li | 5,976 | 1.65 |
| Conservative | Alex Sagert | 5,772 | 1.59 |
| Conservative | Dale Bains | 5,676 | 1.56 |
| Richmond Citizens | Alton Cheung | 5,175 | 1.43 |
| We Are Richmond | Tony Ortega | 4,337 | 1.20 |
| We Are Richmond | Jenny Gonzales Mata | 4,321 | 1.19 |
| Independent | Daniel Tsang | 4,282 | 1.18 |
| Conservative | Adam Dobrer | 4,234 | 1.17 |
| We Are Richmond | Michael Lok | 3,520 | 0.97 |
| Richmond Citizens | Tamás Revóczi | 3,259 | 0.90 |
| One Richmond | Kevin Lainchbury | 3,177 | 0.88 |
| Action Richmond | Edward He | 3,132 | 0.86 |
| Independent | Mario Cruz | 3,080 | 0.85 |
| Conservative | Oday Brahem | 3,032 | 0.84 |
| Independent | Tim Fan | 2,745 | 0.76 |
| Independent | Donald Flintoff | 2,295 | 0.63 |
| Independent | Adil Awan | 2,265 | 0.62 |
| Independent | Ben Lee | 2,051 | 0.57 |
| We Are Richmond | Adnan Sarwar | 2,042 | 0.56 |
| Independent | Dennis Page | 1,880 | 0.52 |
| Independent | Hong Yan Melody Pan | 1,794 | 0.49 |
| Unknown | Andy Z. Wang | 1,347 | 0.37 |
| Independent | Alan Lackstein | 1,309 | 0.36 |
| Independent | Milan Kljajic | 1,302 | 0.36 |
| Independent | Louis Huang | 1,272 | 0.35 |
| Independent | Andrew Mrozowski | 1,193 | 0.33 |
| Turnout | | | |

=== Richmond School Board election ===
Announced candidates for Richmond School Board are as follows: Bill Mok, Rod Belleza, Dean Billings, Danny Chang, Phyllis Tang, Willy Sinconegue, and Helen Quan.

== Saanich ==
2026 Saanich municipal election

8 seats on Saanich District Council + 1 mayor (5 seats needed for majority)
- Turnout: 42.74%
- Mayoral election
| Candidate | Rishi Sharma | Zac de Vries | Karen Harper |
| Party | Save Our Saanich | Independent | Independent |
| Popular vote | 17,157 | 14,785 | 5,299 |
| Percentage | 45.31% | 39.05% | 13.99% |
mayor before election
Dean Murdock
Independent
Elected mayor
Rishi Sharma
Save Our Saanich
- City council election
| Party | Seats | +/– |
|---|---|---|
| Save Our Saanich | 6 | +6 |
| Independents | 3 | −6 |
This lists parties that won seats. See the complete results below.

=== Mayoral election ===
| Party | Mayoral candidate | Votes | % |
|---|---|---|---|
| **Save Our Saanich** | **Rishi Sharma** † | **17,157** | **45.31** |
| Independent | Zac de Vries | 14,785 | 39.05 |
| Independent | Karen Harper | 5,299 | 13.99 |
| Independent | Robin Stanbridge | 624 | 1.65 |

=== Saanich District Council election ===
The results for Saanich District Council were as follows:

Top 8 candidates elected

| Party | Council candidate | Votes | % |
|---|---|---|---|
| **Save Our Saanich** | **Lorne DeLarge** † | **16,615** | **6.66** |
| **Save Our Saanich** | **Nancy Di Castri** † | **16,319** | **6.54** |
| **Independent** | **Colin Plant** (X) † | **16,174** | **6.49** |
| **Save Our Saanich** | **Laurie Lidstone** † | **15,389** | **6.17** |
| **Save Our Saanich** | **Graham Wright** † | **15,101** | **6.06** |
| **Save Our Saanich** | **Matt McGeachie** † | **14,591** | **5.85** |
| **Independent** | **Nathalie Chambers** (X) † | **13,027** | **5.22** |
| **Independent** | **Teale Phelps Bondaroff** (X) † | **12,735** | **5.11** |
| Independent | Mauricio Curbelo | 12,631 | 5.07 |
| Independent | Susan Brice (X) | 11,462 | 4.60 |
| Independent | Judy Brownoff (X) | 10,473 | 4.20 |
| Independent | Colette Baty | 9,428 | 3.78 |
| Independent | Harjas Singh Poli | 9,020 | 3.62 |
| Independent | Hollis Hodson | 7,490 | 3.00 |
| Independent | Sasha Izard | 7,324 | 2.94 |
| Independent | Don Cameron | 6,766 | 2.68 |
| Independent | Erin Elizabeth Booth | 6,676 | 2.71 |
| Independent | Garnett Humenick | 6,405 | 2.57 |
| Independent | Jordan Weaver | 6,299 | 2.53 |
| Independent | Finn Fairbairn | 5,990 | 2.40 |
| Independent | Alli Deelstra | 5,005 | 2.01 |
| Independent | Brendan Ralfs | 4,172 | 1.67 |
| Independent | Noah Fruttarol | 3,771 | 1.51 |
| Independent | Sierra Wicks-Irving | 3,303 | 1.32 |
| Independent | Tia Sibbald | 2,613 | 1.05 |
| Independent | Nic Renaud | 1,545 | 0.62 |
| Turnout | | | |

== Salmon Arm ==
The results in Salmon Arm were as follows:

== Salt Spring Island Electoral Area ==
The results in Capital Regional District Electoral Area F (Salt Spring Island) were as follows:

== Sechelt ==
The results in Sechelt were as follows:

=== Mayoral election ===
| Mayoral candidate | Vote | % |
|---|---|---|
| **Paul Dhillon** † | **2,543** | **61.5** |
| Alton Toth | 1,340 | 32.4 |
| Dianne McLauchlan | 249 | 6.0 |

=== Sechelt Council election ===
The results for Sechelt Council were as follows:

Top 6 candidates elected

| Council candidate | Vote | % |
|---|---|---|
| **Ken Whitaker** † | **1,951** | **47.0** |
| **Desmond Das** † | **1,724** | **41.6** |
| **Craig Moore** † | **1,591** | **38.4** |
| **Anna MacNeil** † | **1,550** | **37.4** |
| **Thomas Lamb** † | **1,519** | **36.6** |
| **Darren Inkster** (X) † | **1,463** | **35.3** |
| Darnelda Siegers | 1,389 | 33.5 |
| Joanne van Ginkel | 1,337 | 32.2 |
| Adam Shepherd (X) | 1,275 | 30.7 |
| Mary Degan | 1,156 | 27.9 |
| Rose Steele | 1,135 | 27.4 |
| Gary Trinder | 964 | 23.2 |
| Landon Dixon | 938 | 22.6 |
| Lisa Humphries | 796 | 19.2 |
| Pamela Jones | 570 | 13.7 |
| Dan Fouillard | 533 | 12.8 |
| Allan Holt | 481 | 11.6 |
| Bruce Randall | 447 | 10.8 |
| Marc Emery | 388 | 9.4 |
| Turnout | 4,148 | 43.7 |

== Sidney ==
The results in Sidney were as follows:

== Smithers ==
The results in Smithers were as follows:

== Sooke ==
The results in Sooke were as follows:

== Southern Gulf Islands Electoral Area ==
The results in Capital Regional District Electoral Area G (Southern Gulf Islands) were as follows:

== Spallumcheen ==
The results in Spallumcheen were as follows:

== Squamish ==
The results in Squamish were as follows:

== Summerland ==
The results in Summerland were as follows:

== Terrace ==
The results in Terrace were as follows:

== Trail ==
The results in Trail were as follows:

== Vernon ==
=== Mayoral election ===
The results for mayor of Vernon were as follows:

| Mayoral candidate | Vote | % |
|---|---|---|
| Victor Cumming (X) | | |
| Kari Gares | | |
| Wayne Lippert | | |

=== Vernon City Council election ===
The results for Vernon City Council were as follows:

Top 6 candidates elected

== Victoria ==
=== Mayoral election ===
The results for mayor of Victoria were as follows:

| Mayoral candidate | Vote | % |
|---|---|---|
| **Marianne Alto** (X) † | **13,505** | **44.17** |
| Bruce McGuigan | 10,531 | 34.44 |
| Mike Harris | 3,518 | 11.51 |
| Darren Gervais-Harrison | 1,530 | 5.00 |
| Lyall Atkinson | 457 | 1.49 |
| Gregoor Miller | 403 | 1.32 |
| Christopher Hanna | 388 | 1.27 |
| David Johnston | 243 | 0.79 |

=== Victoria City Council election ===
The results for Victoria City Council were as follows:

Top 8 candidates elected

| Party | Council candidate | Votes | % of vote | % of ballots |
|---|---|---|---|---|
| **Independent** | **Stephen Hammond** (X) † | **15,092** | **7.39** | **48.2** |
| **Independent** | **Matt Dell** (X) † | **14,291** | **6.99** | **45.7** |
| **Independent** | **Marg Gardiner** (X) † | **14,208** | **6.95** | **45.4** |
| **Independent** | **Jeremy Caradonna** (X) † | **14,132** | **6.92** | **45.2** |
| **Independent** | **Melissa Cseszko** † | **13,971** | **6.84** | **44.7** |
| **Independent** | **Jack Sandor** † | **13,777** | **6.74** | **44.0** |
| **Independent** | **Wendy Bowkett** † | **13,545** | **6.63** | **43.3** |
| **Independent** | **Dave Thompson** (X) † | **13,103** | **6.41** | **41.9** |
| Independent | Krista Loughton (X) | 13,088 | 6.40 | 41.8 |
| Independent | Bella Lee | 12,947 | 6.34 | 41.4 |
| Independent | Arthur McInnis | 12,931 | 6.33 | 41.3 |
| Independent | Karen Rothe | 12,806 | 6.27 | 40.9 |
| Victoria For All | Susan Kim (X) | 9,890 | 4.84 | 31.6 |
| Victoria For All | Peter Rose Gibbs | 8,798 | 4.31 | 28.1 |
| Independent | Jerry Garcia | 7,126 | 3.49 | 22.8 |
| Independent | Jason Heit | 5,695 | 2.79 | 18.2 |
| Independent | Martin Girard | 2,867 | 1.40 | 9.2 |
| Independent | Shona Dion | 2,378 | 1.16 | 7.6 |
| Independent | Herb Collins | 1,968 | 0.96 | 6.3 |
| Independent | Steve Filipovic | 1,058 | 0.52 | 3.4 |
| Independent | James Harasymow | 683 | 0.33 | 2.2 |
| Turnout | | | | |

== West Kelowna ==
The results in West Kelowna were as follows:

=== Mayoral election ===
Stephen Johnston was declared elected by acclamation on 21 September 2026, by the chief election officer for the City of West Kelowna, taking office with the rest of the elected councillors on 3 November 2026.

== View Royal ==
The results in View Royal were as follows:

=== Mayoral election ===
| Mayoral candidate | Vote | % |
|---|---|---|
| **Volker Dammann** † | **1,131** | **34.6** |
| David Screech | 1,058 | 32.3 |
| Ryan Painter | 856 | 26.2 |
| Anna Becker | 164 | 5.0 |
| Teodora Kristof | 35 | 1.1 |

=== View Royal Municipal Council Election ===
Top 6 candidates elected

| Mayoral candidate | Vote | % of ballots |
|---|---|---|
| **Gery Lemon** (X) † | **1,833** | **56.0** |
| **Amy McCooey** † | **1,767** | **54.0** |
| **Sacha Christensen** † | **1,765** | **53.9** |
| **Don Brown** (X) † | **1,472** | **45.0** |
| **Carolynne Clark** † | **1,402** | **42.8** |
| **Cam Harris** † | **1,347** | **41.2** |
| Ron Mattson (X) | 1,334 | 40.8 |
| Sean MacKenzie | 1,203 | 36.8 |
| Owen Marshall | 1,194 | 36.5 |
| Diane Fownes | 730 | 22.3 |
| Spencer Dixon | 479 | 14.6 |
| Jay Josh | 414 | 12.7 |
| Turnout | | |

== West Vancouver ==
=== Mayoral election ===
The results for mayor of West Vancouver were as follows:

| Mayoral candidate | Votes | % |
|---|---|---|
| Kirk LaPointe | | |
| Mark Sager (X) | | |
| Joe Spears | | |
| Sharon Thompson | | |

=== West Vancouver District Council election ===
The results for West Vancouver District Council were as follows:

Top 6 candidates elected

== Whistler ==
The results in Whistler were as follows:

=== Whistler City Council ===
The results of Whistler City Council were as follows:

Top 6 candidates elected

== White Rock ==
The results in White Rock were as follows:

=== White Rock City Council ===
The results for White Rock City Council were as follows:

Top 6 candidates elected

== Williams Lake ==
The results in Williams Lake were as follows:
