= NWP =

NWP may refer to:

== Businesses and organisations ==
- National Woman's Party, U.S., 1916–2021
- National Writing Project, U.S.
- New West Progressives, a municipal political party in New Westminster, Canada, founded in 2017
- New World Pasta, a North American pasta manufacturer, 1999–2021
- Northwestern Polytechnic, a Canadian college, founded 1966
- North Wales Police, U.K., founded 1974

== Places ==
- Newport railway station, Wales (CRS code: NWP)
- Northwest Passage, a sea route
- Northwestern Pacific Railroad, a U.S. rail route

== Science ==
- Numerical weather prediction, mathematical modelling of the atmosphere and oceans
