= Patrick Johnstone =

Canadian municipal politician

38th Mayor of New Westminster
- In office November 7, 2022 – November 2, 2026
- Preceded by: Jonathan X. Côte
- Succeeded by: Daniel Fontaine

New Westminster City Councillor
- In office December 1, 2014 – November 7, 2022

Personal details
- Born: Patrick David Johnstone Kootenays, British Columbia, Canada
- Party: Community First New West
- Other political affiliations: Independent (until 2021)
- Education: Simon Fraser University
- Occupation: Politician
- Profession: Geoscientist
- Website: www.patrickjohnstone.ca

Patrick David Johnstone is a Canadian politician and geoscientist who was the mayor of New Westminster, British Columbia from 2022 to 2026. Prior to becoming mayor, he served two terms as a city councillor on the New Westminster City Council from 2014 to 2022. He has been a member of Community First New West, a social democratic municipal political party, since 2022.

Aside from his work in local government, Johnstone also runs his blog, Ask Pat, where he writes about city council proceedings from his perspective and responds to online questions submitted by members of the public. On occasion, Johnstone will also set up an Ask Pat booth at local gatherings where he answers questions and speaks with members of the public.

== Early life and education ==
Patrick Johnstone is from the Kootenays region of British Columbia, where he was born and lived during his youth. He attended Simon Fraser University and completed a bachelor of science degree in geography in 1997, and a master of science degree in earth science in 2006.

According to his blog, Johnstone first arrived in New Westminster during the 1980s, and decided to live there permanently in the early 2000s.

Prior to entering politics, Johnstone worked as a project scientist for SNC-Lavalin from 2005 to 2009, and became the environmental coordinator for the City of Richmond in 2009. Jonhstone also got involved in his neighbourhood's Brow of the Hill Residents’ Association, the Royal City Curling Club, and began writing his blog. He was named New Westminster's Citizen of the Year in 2013 by the New Westminster Chamber of Commerce for his contributions to the city of New Westminster.

== Political career ==
After many years of working for various municipalities in Metro Vancouver, Johnstone decided to enter politics by running for New Westminster City Council in the 2014 election. On election day, he placed fifth and was elected to city council given the city's plurality-at-large electoral system. He was re-elected in 2018.

In 2022, Johnstone helped create Community First New West, a social democratic municipal political party in New Westminster. Johnstone subsequently won the party's nomination for the 2022 British Columbia municipal elections. In October 2022, Johnstone won the mayoral election, after receiving 41.93% of votes in a three-candidate race.

Johnstone attended the 2023 United Nations Climate Change Conference (COP28) in December 2023, following an invite from the C40 Cities Climate Leadership Group and the ICLEI to represent the City of New Westminster. His trip became the subject of controversy when opposing city councillors criticized Johnstone for not informing city council of his plan to attend the conference. New Westminster City Council eventually rejected the request for a report into the mayor's trip, as New Westminster did not have rules that require elected officials to disclose their travel itinerary to city council, and the trip was not funded by the city's budget. However, the city's ethics commissioner later ruled that his trip to the conference did breach the city's ethics rules, and recommended that Johnstone receive additional ethics training.

Johnstone oversaw several upgrades to New Westminster's cycling and pedestrian network, including the extension of the network to New Westminster Secondary School via Sixth Street, and the construction of a protected bike path along the Stewardson Way section of the BC Parkway. Johnstone's government also advocated for more speed and red-light cameras to be installed by the provincial government in New Westminster, arguing that one third of police and fire department responses in the city were caused by traffic incidents that could be mitigated with traffic enforcement cameras.

Johnstone ran for re-election in the 2026 municipal election but lost the race to city councillor Daniel Fontaine.

== Electoral record ==
2026 New Westminster municipal election: Mayor
** Preliminary results — Not yet official **
Party	Candidate	Votes	%	Elected
New West Progressives	Daniel Fontaine	12,361	54.96	✓
Community First New West	Patrick Johnstone (X)	10,128	45.04	
Total valid votes		22,489		
Total rejected ballots				
Turnout				
Note: (X) indicates the incumbent mayor

2022 New Westminster municipal election: Mayor
Party	Candidate	Votes	%	Elected
Community First New West	Patrick Johnstone	6,676	41.93	check
New West Progressives	Ken Armstrong	5,227	33.05	
Independent	Chuck Puchmayr	3,912	26.74	
Total valid votes		15,815	99.32	
Total rejected ballots		108	0.68	
Turnout		15,923	37.52	
Source: CivicInfoBC

2018 New Westminster municipal election: City council
Party	Candidate	Votes	%	Elected
Independent	Nadine Nakagawa	7,764	54.04	✓
Independent	Patrick Johnstone	7,270	50.60	✓
Independent	Mary Trentadue	7,202	50.13	✓
Independent	Jaimie McEvoy	6,799	47.32	✓
Independent	Chinu Das	6,716	46.74	✓
Independent	Chuck Puchmayr	6,595	45.90	✓
New West Progressives	Daniel Fontaine	5,297	36.87	
New West Progressives	Ellen Vaillancourt	4,760	33.13	
New West Progressives	Paul McNamara	4,531	31.54	
New West Progressives	Bryn Ward	4,490	31.25	
Independent	Mike Ireland	3,253	22.64	
Independent	Angela Sealy	3,013	20.97	
Independent	Troy Hunter	2,638	18.36	
Independent	Benny Ogden	1,299	9.04	

2014 New Westminster municipal election: City council
Party	Candidate	Votes	%	Elected
Independent	Chuck Puchmayr	6,262	43.00	✓
Independent	Lorrie Williams	6,087	41.79	✓
Independent	Jaimie McEvoy	5835	40.06	✓
Independent	Bill Harper	5634	38.68	✓
Independent	Patrick Johnstone	5582	38.33	✓
Independent	Mary Trentadue	5,517	37.88	✓
Independent	Catherine Cartwright	5,165	35.46	
Independent	Tej Kainth	5,111	35.09	
Independent	Calvin Donnelly	4,394	30.17	
Independent	David Brett	3,383	23.23	
Independent	Scott McIntosh	2,579	17.71	
Independent	John Ashdown	1,895	13.01	
Independent	Tracey Block	1,847	12.68	
Independent	Gavin Palmer	1,773	12.17	
Independent	Mike Folka	1,637	11.24	
Independent	Marge Ashdown	1,636	11.23	
Independent	Harm Woldring	1,610	11.23	
Independent	Jim Bell	1,562	10.73	
Independent	Raj Gupta	1,235	8.48	
Independent	Gerry Liu	791	5.43	
Independent	Matt Kadioglu	269	1.85	
