= Chuck Puchmayr =

Canadian politician

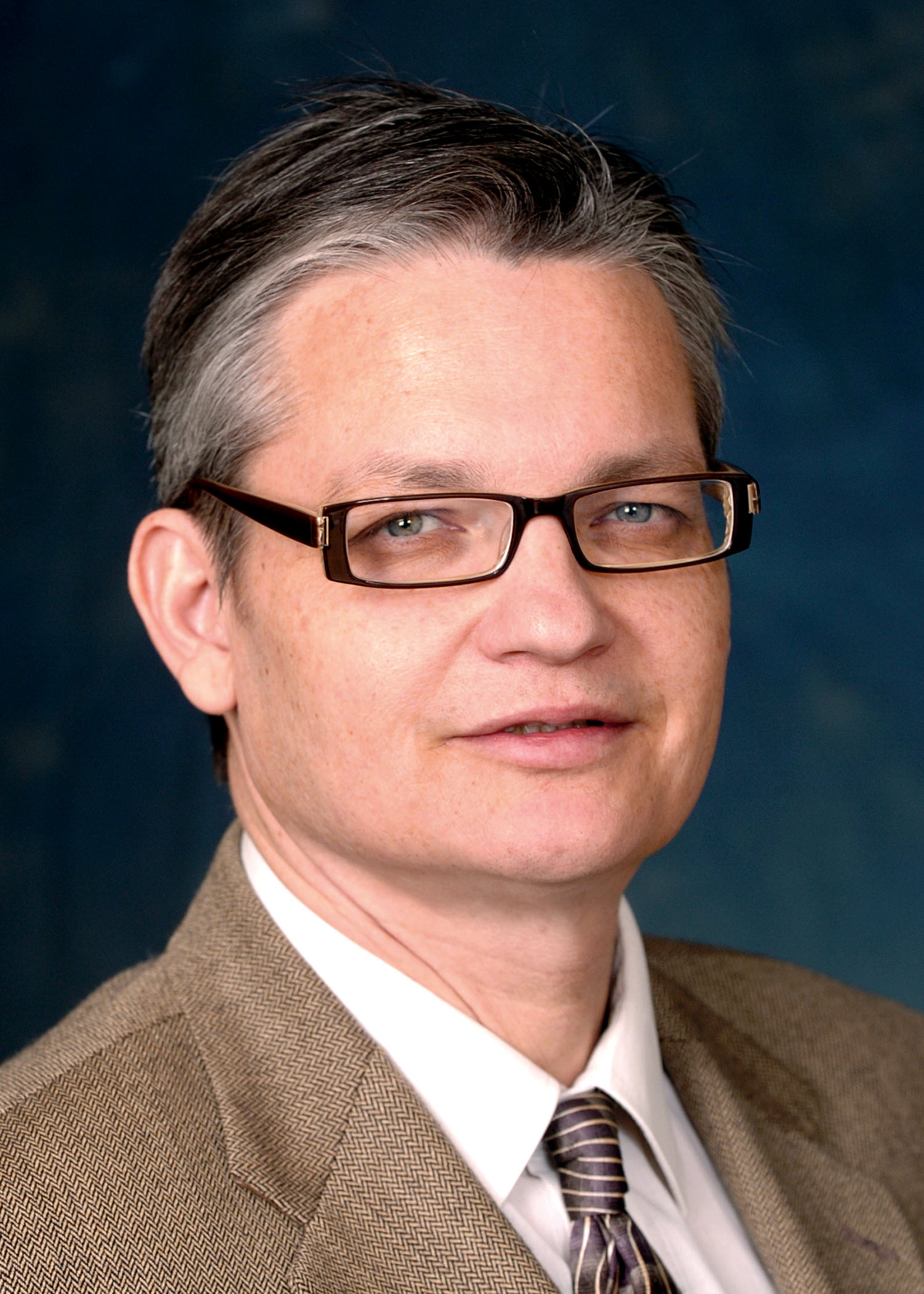

Member of the Legislative Assembly for New Westminster
- In office May 17, 2005 – May 12, 2009
- Preceded by: Joyce Murray
- Succeeded by: Dawn Black

New Westminster City Councillor
- In office 2011–2022
- In office 1996–2005

Personal details
- Born: 1953 or 1954 (age 71–72)
- Party: New Democrat

Charles Puchmayr (born 1953 or 1954) is a retired Canadian politician who served as Member of the Legislative Assembly (MLA) for New Westminster in British Columbia from 2005 to 2009, as part of the British Columbia New Democratic Party (BC NDP) caucus.

== Biography ==
Prior to his election to the legislature, Puchmayr was a city councillor in New Westminster from 1996 to 2005. He was involved in the founding of the New Westminster Food Bank and the Unemployment Action Centre, and served as director for the Westminster Legal Services Society.

At the 2005 provincial election, Puchmayr ran as the BC NDP candidate in the riding of New Westminster, and defeated incumbent BC Liberal candidate Joyce Murray. He served as the NDP's labour critic in the 38th Parliament. He disclosed his liver cancer diagnosis in January 2009, and announced that he would not run in that May's provincial election. He received a liver transplant in the same month, and served out the remainder of his term as MLA.

Puchmayr returned to New Westminster City Council in 2011 following a successful run for councillor, and was re-elected in 2014 and 2018. He ran for mayor of the city in 2022, but came in third place behind winner Patrick Johnstone and runner-up Ken Armstrong; he subsequently announced his retirement from politics.

== Electoral record ==
=== Provincial ===
2005 British Columbia general election: New Westminster
Party	Candidate	Votes	%	±%	Expenditures
New Democratic	Chuck Puchmayr	13,226	51.32	+20.30	$61,892
Liberal	Joyce Murray	9,645	37.42	−11.78	$135,015
Green	Robert Broughton	2,416	9.37	−3.90	$1,417
Marijuana	Christina Racki	293	1.14	−2.68	$100
Democratic Reform	John Robinson Warren	152	0.59	–	$410
Platinum	Greg Calcutta	42	0.16	–	$100
Total valid votes		25,774	100.00		
Total rejected ballots		166	0.64	+0.14	
Turnout		25,940	63.91	−6.5	
New Democratic gain from Liberal		Swing		+16.04	

=== Municipal ===
2022 New Westminster municipal election: Mayor
Party	Candidate	Votes	%	Elected
Community First New West	Patrick Johnstone	6,676	41.93	check
New West Progressives	Ken Armstrong	5,227	33.05	
Independent	Chuck Puchmayr	3,912	26.74	
Total valid votes		15,815	99.32	
Total rejected ballots		108	0.68	
Turnout		15,923	37.52	
Source: CivicInfoBC
