= 2026 British Columbia elections =

2026 British Columbia elections or 2026 British Columbia election may refer to:

- 2026 British Columbia municipal elections, the local elections held to elect mayors, electoral area directors, city councillors, and school trustees
- 2026 British Columbia general election, the provincial election to elect members to the Legislative Assembly
