= Beth Johnson =

Beth Johnson may refer to:

- Beth Johnson (Florida politician) (1909–1973), member of the Florida House of Representatives and the Florida Senate
- Beth Johnson (Canadian politician), mayor of Delta, British Columbia, Canada
