= Community First New West =

Municipal political party in Canada

- Active municipal party
- Abbreviation: CFNW
- Chairperson: Nancy Kato
- Founded: December 2021; 4 years ago
- Preceded by: Team Cote (unofficially)
- Ideology: Social democracy; Green politics
- Political position: Centre-left
- National affiliation: New Democratic Party
- Provincial affiliation: BC NDP
- Colours: Orange
- Mayor and Council: 1 / 7
- School Board: 1 / 7

Website
- www.communityfirstnw.ca
- Politics of British Columbia; Political parties; Elections; Information correct as of October 17, 2026

Community First New Westminster (CFNW) is a municipal political party in the Canadian city of New Westminster, British Columbia. They were founded in 2022 in preparation for the 2022 British Columbia municipal elections. They are led by Patrick Johnstone, the current mayor of New Westminster. They are affiliated with the New Democratic Party, a Canadian centre-left political party.

== History ==
For most of New Westminster's history, there were no municipal political parties. However, this changed in 2018 when members of the community created the New West Progressives party, who opposed the incumbent mayor, Jonathan X. Côte, and his allies in city council and the school board. In light of this new opposition, Côte and other like-minded candidates who had been endorsed by the New Westminster District and Labour Council (including Patrick Johnstone, Chuck Puchmayr, and Jaimie McEvoy) began campaigning together under the banner of Team Cote.

In December 2021, most members of Team Cote decided to formalize their alliance and became a registered political party with Elections BC, and were founded as the Together New West Electors Society. Later that month, they renamed themselves as Forward New West, before being renamed once again in 2022 to its current name. Côte decided against running for re-election for the 2022 election, and endorsed Patrick Johnstone, who went on to win the party's mayoral nomination prior to the election. Despite being a former New Democratic MLA, Chuck Puchmayr did not join Community First with many of his colleagues, and decided to run for mayor as an independent, citing a preference for non-partisan politics in New Westminster.

In their first election, Community First won the mayoral election, and achieved majorities in both city council and the school board.

In 2023, the party was involved in a controversy surrounding Dee Beattie, a Community First member of the school board. In the summer of 2023, Beattie was caught using a fake Twitter account to inappropriately reply to users who were critical of her work on the school board. Following the allegations, and an eventual apology from Beattie, the party cut ties with her. Beattie resigned from the school board on September 26, 2023.

== Election results ==
=== General elections ===
| Election | Mayoral election | | | | City council election | | | School board election | | |
| Election | Candidate | Votes | % | Result | Candidates | Elected (Note: Number of seats includes the party's mayoral candidate if they were also elected.) | Status (Note: Unlike the House of Commons of Canada or the legislative assemblies of Canadian provinces and territories, municipal political caucuses in New Westminster are not officically recognized. The label of majority government, minority government, or opposition is a de-facto distinction and has no impact on how these bodies are required to conduct legislative business.) | Candidates | Elected | Status |
|---|---|---|---|---|---|---|---|---|---|---|
| 2022 | Patrick Johnstone | 6,676 | 42.21 | Won | 6+1 | 5 / 7 | Majority | 6 | 6 / 7 | Majority |
| 2026 | Patrick Johnstone | 10,128 | 45.04 | Lost (2nd) | 6+1 | 1 / 7 | Opposition | 5 | 1 / 7 | Opposition |

=== By-elections ===
| Date | Type | Candidate | % | Result | Status |
|---|---|---|---|---|---|
| February 3, 2024 | School board | Jalen Bachra | 35.21 | ▼ Lost (2nd) | Majority |
