= VirtualSchoolBC =

Coordinates: 49.2007°N 122.9192°W

VirtualSchoolBC is an online school offering free secondary school courses to British Columbia residents. It is headquartered in New Westminster, British Columbia, Canada.

VirtualSchoolBC is a public school within School District 40 New Westminster. It is funded by the Ministry of Education of British Columbia. Students who complete courses may add them to or complete a graduation plan.

VirtualSchoolBC uses BlackBoard Learn to deliver continuous entry courses. It is a member of LearnNowBC.

== Background ==
In 1998, a group of teachers began offering continuous entry high school courses online using WebCT. In 2006, WebCT was bought by BlackBoard. VirtualSchoolBC ported their courses to BlackBoard Learn.
