= New Westminster City Council =

Governing body of New Wesminster, British Columbia, Canada

Type
- Type: Unicameral

History
- Founded: July 16, 1860

Leadership
- Mayor: Daniel Fontaine, New West Progressives since November 2, 2026

Structure
- Seats: 6 councillors and 1 mayor
- Political groups: New West Progressives (6) Community First New West (1)

Elections
- Voting system: Plurality at-large voting (councillors); First past the post (mayor)
- Last election: October 17, 2026
- Next election: October 19, 2030

Meeting place
- Council Chamber; New Westminster City Hall; New Westminster, British Columbia

Website
- www.newwestcity.ca/city_hall/mayor_and_council/index.php

New Westminster City Council is the governing body of New Westminster, British Columbia. The council consists of the mayor of New Westminster, and six councillors elected to serve a four-year term.

The current mayor is Daniel Fontaine. City council meetings are held in New Westminster City Hall, and are usually scheduled on Monday evenings. The most recent election was on October 17, 2026.

== History ==
The council was the first municipal government to be established in mainland British Columbia in 1860 by the Municipal Council Act. From 1860 to 1872, the council's presiding officer, known as the president of New Westminster, was internally elected by the sitting councillors. This changed in 1873 when the provincial government mandated that the council would be led by a separately elected mayor.

Prior to 1940, elections for city council occurred every year. In 1940, the council terms were extended to two years, and in 1990 the council's term length was extended to three-year terms. Since 2014, city council terms have been four years long.

== Current membership ==
New West Progressives: 6 seats Community First New West: 1 seat

| Name | Party | Position |
|---|---|---|
| Daniel Fontaine | New West Progressives | Mayor |
| Ken Armstrong | New West Progressives | Councillor |
| Karima Budhwani | New West Progressives | Councillor |
| Rick Folka | New West Progressives | Councillor |
| Tasha Henderson | Community First New West | Councillor |
| Paul Minhas | New West Progressives | Councillor |
| Maryann Morrison | New West Progressives | Councillor |

== Past membership ==
=== 2022–2026 ===
| Name | Party | Position |
|---|---|---|
| Patrick Johnstone | Community First New West | Mayor |
| Ruby Campbell | Community First New West | Councillor |
| Daniel Fontaine | New West Progressives | Councillor |
| Tasha Henderson | Community First New West | Councillor |
| Jaimie McEvoy | Community First New West | Councillor |
| Paul Minhas | New West Progressives | Councillor |
| Nadine Nakagawa | Community First New West (until June 2023) | Councillor |
| Nadine Nakagawa | Independent (since June 2023) | Councillor |

=== 2018–2022 ===
| Name | Party | Position |
|---|---|---|
| Jonathan X. Côte | Independent (Note: Although technically independent, Jonathan Côte, Chinu Das, Patrick Johnstone, Jaimie McEvoy, Nadine Nakagawa, Chuck Puchmayr, and Mary Trentadue all endorsed each other and had campaigned together under the "Team Côte" slogan.) | Mayor |
| Chinu Das | Independent | Councillor |
| Patrick Johnstone | Independent | Councillor |
| Jaimie McEvoy | Independent | Councillor |
| Nadine Nakagawa | Independent | Councillor |
| Chuck Puchmayr | Independent | Councillor |
| Mary Trentadue | Independent | Councillor |

=== 2014–2018 ===
| Name | Party | Position |
|---|---|---|
| Jonathan X. Côte | Independent | Mayor |
| Bill Harper | Independent | Councillor |
| Patrick Johnstone | Independent | Councillor |
| Jaimie McEvoy | Independent | Councillor |
| Chuck Puchmayr | Independent | Councillor |
| Mary Trentadue | Independent | Councillor |
| Lorrie Williams | Independent | Councillor |

=== 2011–2014 ===
| Name | Party | Position |
|---|---|---|
| Wayne Wright | Independent | Mayor |
| Jonathan X. Côte | Independent | Councillor |
| Bill Harper | Independent | Councillor |
| Jaimie McEvoy | Independent | Councillor |
| Betty McIntosh | Independent | Councillor |
| Chuck Puchmayr | Independent | Councillor |
| Lorrie Williams | Independent | Councillor |

=== 2008–2011 ===
2008 New Westminster municipal election:

| Name | Party | Position |
|---|---|---|
| Wayne Wright | Independent | Mayor |
| Jonathan X. Côte | Independent | Councillor |
| Bill Harper | Independent | Councillor |
| Jaimie McEvoy | Independent | Councillor |
| Betty McIntosh | Independent | Councillor |
| Bob Osterman | Independent | Councillor |
| Lorrie Williams | Independent | Councillor |

=== 2005–2008 ===
2005 British Columbia municipal election:

| Name | Party | Position |
|---|---|---|
| Wayne Wright | Independent | Mayor |
| Jonathan X. Côte | Independent | Councillor |
| Calvin Donnelly | Independent | Councillor |
| Bill Harper | Independent | Councillor |
| Betty McIntosh | Independent | Councillor |
| Bob Osterman | Independent | Councillor |
| Lorrie Williams | Independent | Councillor |

=== 2002–2005 ===
2002 British Columbia municipal election:

| Name | Party | Position |
|---|---|---|
| Wayne Wright | Independent | Mayor |
| Casey Cook | Independent | Councillor |
| Jerry Dobrovolny | Independent | Councillor |
| Calvin Donnelly | Independent | Councillor |
| Bob Osterman | Independent | Councillor |
| Chuck Puchmayr | Independent | Councillor |
| Lorrie Williams | Independent | Councillor |

=== 1999–2002 ===
1999 British Columbia municipal election:

| Name | Party | Position |
|---|---|---|
| Helen Sparkes | Independent | Mayor |
| Casey Cook | Independent | Councillor |
| Jerry Dobrovolny | Independent | Councillor |
| Calvin Donnelly | Independent | Councillor |
| Betty McIntosh | Independent | Councillor |
| Bob Osterman | Independent | Councillor |
| Chuck Puchmayr | Independent | Councillor |

=== 1996–1999 ===
1996 British Columbia municipal election:

| Name | Party | Position |
|---|---|---|
| Helen Sparkes | Independent | Mayor |
| Casey Cook | Independent | Councillor |
| Jerry Dobrovolny | Independent | Councillor |
| Betty McIntosh | Independent | Councillor |
| Charmaine Diane Murray | Independent | Councillor |
| Bob Osterman | Independent | Councillor |
| Chuck Puchmayr | Independent | Councillor |

=== 1993–1996 ===
1993:

| Name | Party | Position |
|---|---|---|
| Betty Toporowski | Independent | Mayor |
| Casey Cook | Independent | Councillor |
| Kathy Cherris | Independent | Councillor |
| Calvin Donnelly | Independent | Councillor |
| Lynda Fletcher-Gordon | Independent | Councillor |
| Charmaine Diane Murray | Independent | Councillor |
| Helen Sparkes | Independent | Councillor |
