= Achieving For Delta =

- Abbreviation: A4D
- Leader: George Harvie
- Founded: 2018
- Ideology: Localism; Fiscal conservatism
- Political position: Centre-right
- Colours: Dark green, lime green, white
- Mayor: 1 / 1
- City council: 6 / 6
- School board: 6 / 7

Website
- https://www.afdelta.com/

Achieving For Delta is a municipal political party in Delta, British Columbia, Canada. It is led by an executive team who according to Elections BC is owned by Don Sangster and the Financial Agent is Knut Nordlie. The party was formed in 2018 by George Harvie following the resignation of former mayor Lois Jackson, electing 4 out of 6 council members.

== Second term (2022–present) ==
On October 15, 2022, Achieving For Delta ran a slate for the 2nd time, electing 7 out of 7 city council slots, and 6 out of 7 school board slots.

On December 3, 2025, four councillors were removed by Mayor George Harvie from the Achieving for Delta slate.

The four councillors, formerly associated with Achieving for Delta, accused Harvie of limiting communication and attempting to centralize decision-making within City Hall. Harvie removed the councillors, stating the group of four “did their best to isolate and sideline me and get me removed from Metro Vancouver,” and that they should not be surprised they were removed from his party, stating political motive from the four in their decision to remove him from the board.

== 2026 municipal election ==
As of August 2026, Harvie has announced a slate for the elections in October 2026, with incumbent councillors Jessie Dosanjh and Alicia Guichon on board as well as incumbent trustee Nick Kanakos and new candidates Sonya Sangster, Ikjot Sandhu, and Jennyfer Cassar, and for schoolboard Achieving for Delta has named Erica Beard, Joe Muego and Nimmi Daula, all current trustees who are seeking re-election while also adding newcomers Sagar Sanghera, Nenah Sandy, Umendra Singh, and Rick Ocean.

== 2022 election results ==
=== Mayoral election ===
The results for mayor Delta are follows:

Party	Mayoral candidate	Vote	%
Achieving for Delta	George Harvie (X) †	17,050	77.00
Independent	Peter van der Velden	3,751	16.94
Independent	Joginder Randhawa	1,341	6.06

=== Delta City Council election ===
The results for Delta City Council were as follows:

Top 6 candidates elected

Party	Council candidate	Vote	%
Achieving for Delta	Alicia Guichon (X) †	16,533	14.60
Achieving for Delta	Dylan Kruger (X) †	14,242	12.58
Achieving for Delta	Daniel Boisvert †	14,130	12.48
Achieving for Delta	Jennifer Johal †	12,788	11.29
Achieving for Delta	Rod Binder †	12,626	11.15
Achieving for Delta	Jessie Dosanjh †	12,582	11.11
Independent	Brian Read	5,772	5.10
Independent	Maha Balakumar	5,005	4.42
Independent	Pamela Swanigan	4,778	4.22
Independent	Moneca Kolvyn	4,387	3.87
Independent	Duncan Callander	3,812	3.37
Independent	Julien Jacques	3,340	2.95
Independent	Stephan Sun	3,248	2.87

== 2018 election results ==
=== Mayoral election ===
Party	Mayoral candidate	Vote	%
Achieving For Delta	George Harvie	12,325	39.56
Independents Working for You	Jim Cressford	10,533	33.80
Team Delta	Sylvia Bishop	7,353	23.60
Independent	Moneca Kolvyn	553	1.77
Independent	Vytas Vaitkus	221	0.71
Independent	Alex Megalos	174	0.56

=== Delta City Council election ===
Top 6 candidates elected

Party	Council candidate	Vote	%
Achieving For Delta	Alicia Guichon	16,359	10.33
Achieving For Delta	Lois Jackson	14,034	8.86
Achieving For Delta	Dan Copeland	13,726	8.67
Independents Working for You	Jeannie Kanakos (X)	13,249	8.37
Independents Working for You	Bruce McDonald (X)	11,970	7.56
Achieving For Delta	Dylan Kruger	10,101	6.38
Achieving For Delta	Param Grewal	9,500	6.00
Achieving For Delta	Cal Traversy	9,052	5.72
Independents Working for You	Garry Shearer	8,710	5.50
Team Delta	Robert Campbell (X)	8,371	5.29
Team Delta	Joan Hansen	7,928	5.01
Independents Working for You	Sandeep Pandher	7,888	4.98
Team Delta	Simran Walia	6,874	4.34
Team Delta	Kim Kendall	5,507	3.48
Independent	Mike Smith	3,538	2.23
Independent	Darcy Green	3,307	2.09
Independent	Lori Mayhew	3,190	2.01
Independent	Chen Du	2,473	1.56
Independent	Kay Khilvinder Hale	1,431	0.90
Independent	Craig DeCraene	1,118	0.71
