= Jerry Dobrovolny =

Canadian civil engineer, a former civic administrator and retired football player

Chief Administrative Officer and Commissioner for Metro Vancouver Regional District
- In office November 2019 – September, 2026

New Westminster City Councillor
- In office 1996–2005

Personal details
- Born: July 24, 1961 (age 65) New Westminster, British Columbia, Canada
- Football career

Retired
- Position: Offensive tackle
- Roster status: Retired
- CFL status: National

Personal information
- Listed height: 6 ft 6 in (1.98 m)
- Listed weight: 265 lb (120 kg)

Career information
- College: British Columbia
- CFL draft: 1983: 1st round, 1st overall pick

Career history
- 1983–1984: Calgary Stampeders
- 1985: Montreal Concordes
- 1986: Montreal Alouettes
- 1986: Ottawa Rough Riders

Jerry Dobrovolny (born July 24, 1961) is a Canadian civil engineer, a former civic administrator, and retired football player. In November 2019, he began serving as chief administrative officer and commissioner for Metro Vancouver Regional District, having previously served as chief engineer and general manager of Engineering Services for the City of Vancouver, and as a city councillor in New Westminster. In December, 2025 a motion was put forward to the Metro Vancouver Board of Directors calling for his suspension. He resigned in September, 2026.

In his football career, he was an offensive tackle who played for four seasons for the Calgary Stampeders, Montreal Concordes, Montreal Alouettes, and Ottawa Rough Riders. He was drafted first overall in the 1983 CFL draft by the Stampeders. He played college football for the UBC Thunderbirds.
