= Lois Jackson =

Canadian politician

Mayor of Delta
- In office 1999 – November 5, 2018
- Preceded by: Beth Johnson
- Succeeded by: George Harvie

Personal details
- Party: Citizens Association of Delta (pre-1976); The Goode Team (1976-1979); Delta Voters Association (1979-1985); Delta Electors Committee (1987-1990); Independent (1985-1987; 1993-1996); Tri-Delta (1996-2008); Delta Independent Voters Association (2008-2018); Achieving For Delta (2018-2022)

Lois E. Jackson (born c. 1938) is a Canadian politician, formerly the mayor of Delta, British Columbia.

Originally from Sudbury, Ontario, Jackson and her husband first moved to Delta in 1969. She was first elected to Delta Municipal Council in 1972, becoming the first woman to serve on council. She served from 1972 to 1999, taking a short break during the late 70s due to marriage and family stresses.

Apart from her time as mayor she has worked as a realtor, and ran a student residence at the Pacific Vocational Institute (now part of BCIT), and has a husband and multiple children.

== Political History ==
Lois Jackson was first elected to Delta Municipal Council in 1972, when over 60 percent of Delta's population was under 18, becoming the first woman to serve on council.

Jackson was elected in November 1999 to become Delta's second female mayor, replacing the first female mayor Beth Johnson. She was re-elected in a close contest in the 2005 elections to a third term as mayor.

In December 2005, she was elected chair of the Greater Vancouver Regional District board, of which she had been a member for the previous nine years. Vancouver councillor Peter Ladner spent the week of the Union of B.C. Municipalities convention lobbying for support to challenge current chairwoman Jackson in December 2009.

In early 2018, Jackson announced that she would not be seeking another term as Delta's mayor after 19 years in the position. Surprisingly in September 2018, after being asked by her former city planner and candidate for mayor George Harvie, Jackson announced her bid for a seat on Delta Council. She was elected to council on October 19, 2018.

Jackson also retained her spot as chair of the Greater Vancouver Regional District board, and later returned to having her regular position on the board, until Mayor Harvie voted her off the board entirely in 2019 without notice, which Jackson has commented in the news saying this was just days before the Massey Tunnel Expansion funding vote was to be held, which she was unable to vote or speak in as a strong advocate for the project.

In 2022 before the end of her term, Jackson announced her resignation off of council, and publicly states she was really disappointed with how things turned out, and would run for re-election against Harvie if she was younger, mentioning health problems in her family. She also went on to state she would not vote for anyone on the Achieving for Delta slate still led by George Harvie, as the council would not be a good future for Delta according to Jackson.

In May 2024, Mayor Harvie was removed from his position as chair of the Metro Vancouver Board of Directors, and Jackson finally spoke out again about her disapproval of council's sudden decision and the leadership over the past few years, calling it "a sad state of affairs".

== Policies ==
As mayor, Jackson was influential in creating many policies that have had impactful effects on Delta. One major policy that raised controversy was her opposition to a treaty with the Tsawwassen First Nation, for fear it would result in Delta losing its agricultural land. Jackson was also very influential in her disagreement with the province regarding the legalization of marijuana, and the legislation surrounding it, advocating for more funding to be able to ensure enforcement of this issue.

She has also been very vocal about the renewal of the George Massey Tunnel connecting Delta to Richmond and Vancouver, an issue that has been affecting Delta residents for many years but has lacked government funding.
