= School District 40 New Westminster =

School district in New Westminster, British Columbia, Canada

Location
- New Westminster New Westminster in Metro Vancouver Canada
- Coordinates: 49.2039°N 122.9159°W

District information
- Superintendent: Mark Davidson
- Schools: 13
- Budget: CA$96(2024–2025) million

Students and staff
- Students: 7,500

Other information
- Website: newwestschools.ca

School District 40 New Westminster is a school district based in New Westminster, British Columbia, Canada.

The school board serves the city of New Westminster, including the neighbourhood of Queensborough on Lulu Island.

== New Westminster School Board members ==
Elected on October 17, 2026.

Trustee	Party	Position
Danielle Connelly	New West Progressives	Chair
Kathleen Carlsen	New West Progressives	Vice-chair
Don Doyle	New West Progressives	Trustee
Anita Dunn	New West Progressives	Trustee
Liz Fajber	New West Progressives	Trustee
Lucas Steele	New West Progressives	Trustee
Mary Trentadue	Community First New West	Trustee

== Schools ==
New Westminster has a single secondary school, New Westminster Secondary School, three middle schools, and ten elementary schools.

School	Location	Grades
Connaught Heights Elementary School	New Westminster	K-5
Continuing Ed SD 40	New Westminster	9-12
École Qayqayt Elementary School	New Westminster	K-5
F W Howay Elementary School	New Westminster	K-5
Glenbrook Middle School	New Westminster	6-8
Fraser River Middle School	New Westminster	6-8
Herbert Spencer Elementary School	New Westminster	K-5
Hume Park Elementary School	New Westminster	K-5
Lord Kelvin Elementary School	New Westminster	K-5
Lord Tweedsmuir Elementary School	New Westminster	K-5
New Westminster Homelearners' Program	New Westminster	K-9
New Westminster Secondary School	New Westminster	9-12
Power Program	New Westminster	10-12
Queen Elizabeth Elementary School	New Westminster	K-4
Queensborough Middle School	New Westminster	5-8
Royal City Alternate Program	New Westminster	8-10
Royal Columbian Hospital Program	New Westminster	
Sigma Program	New Westminster	10-12
Skwo:wech Elementary School	New Westminster	K-5
VirtualSchoolBC	New Westminster	10-12

== See also ==
- Royal eponyms in Canada—locales in Canada named for royalty akin to Queen Elizabeth Elementary School in New Westminster
