= Beth Johnson (Canadian politician) =

Mayor of Delta
- In office 1990–1999
- Preceded by: Doug Husband
- Succeeded by: Lois Jackson

Beth Johnson is a Canadian consultant, politician and teacher. She was the first female mayor of Delta, British Columbia, Canada.

Johnson previously lived in Los Angeles. From 1974 to 1989, she was a teacher in the School District #38 in Richmond, B.C. She was an alderwoman from 1981 to 1987. 1990 to 1999 saw her as mayor.

She was on Federation of Canadian Municipalities as a member of the Board of Directors (1992–1999), member of the Canadian delegation to the Kyoto and Buenos Aires conferences on Global Climate Change, representing the interests of Canadian municipalities, B.C. Transit Board of Directors (1992–1996), and Director of the Vancouver International Airport Board.
