= George Harvie (politician) =

Canadian politician

Mayor of Delta, British Columbia
- In office November 5, 2018 – November 2, 2026
- Preceded by: Lois Jackson
- Succeeded by: Melissa Granum

Chair, MVRD Board of Directors
- In office November 2022 – July 2024
- Preceded by: Sav Dhaliwal
- Succeeded by: Mike Hurley

Personal details
- Born: c. 1951 (age 74–75) Vancouver, British Columbia
- Party: Achieving For Delta
- Occupation: Politician

George V. Harvie (born c. 1951) is a Canadian politician who is the mayor of the City of Delta, British Columbia, since 2018. He was Delta's chief administration officer (CAO) from 2001 to 2018, and worked for thirty years with the City of Burnaby, including deputy city manager.

== Early life ==
Born in Vancouver, Harvie grew up in Burnaby, British Columbia. Upon getting married, he moved to Delta around 1976.

Harvie was educated at Simon Fraser University, where he earned a BA in Economics. He also holds an Administrative Management Special Certificate and an Environmental Health Diploma of Technology from the British Columbia Institute of Technology, and studied Advanced Management at Dalhousie University.

== Career ==
Beginning in the late 1970s, Harvie worked in various roles for the City of Burnaby including deputy city manager, director of Human Resources, and manager of the Environmental Health Department. Harvie was chief public health inspector in Burnaby during the 1980s and later became the city's deputy manager. He was also the city's director of human resources. Harvie served as Delta's chief administration officer (CAO) from 2001 to 2018. In 2012, Harvie received the Queen Elizabeth II Diamond Jubilee Medal for helping to secure funding for nine infrastructure projects for Delta.

=== Delta mayor ===
After close to 20 years as Delta’s city manager, Harvie officially resigned as CAO in May 2018 to run for mayor in the 2018 mayoral election. He ran with the "Achieving For Delta" slate.

In 2025, he called on the British Columbia government to repeal legislation that required that states allow dense housing near public transit hubs.

=== Municipal politics ===
==== Election 2018 ====
On May 22, 2018, Harvie declared his candidacy for Mayor of Delta. In early September 2018, his Achieving for Delta slate gained four trustees.

On October 20, 2018, Harvie received 40 percent of the vote, against former police chief Jim Cessford and city councillor Sylvia Bishop. Achieving for Delta secured a majority of seats on council (4/6) and three out of seven seats on the city's school board (3/7).

==== Election 2022 ====
In October 2021, Harvie announced his bid for re-election as Mayor of Delta in the 2022 election under the same Achieving for Delta banner as 2018.

On May 24, 2022, Harvie announced his full Achieving for Delta slate for council and the school board.

On October 15, 2022, Harvie was re-elected as Mayor of Delta with 17,050 votes (77%), against mayoral candidates Peter van der Velden and Joginder Randhawa, who had 3,751 votes and 1,341 votes respectively. All six of the Achieving for Delta team of council candidates were also elected, and six of seven Achieving for Delta school trustee candidates were elected.

==== Election 2026 ====
The 2026 Municipal Elections will be held on October 17, 2026. Harvie has announced his re-election bid on April 15th under Achieving For Delta, with a slate of 5 councillors as of May 2nd, 2026. Prior to this announcement, Harvie had announced the removal of four council members who have now formed their own slate under the name One Delta. This split was caused by controversy among the current council, with concerns cited from both sides over disagreements between Harvie, Guichon and Dosanjh and the four One Delta members.
