= New Westminster Secondary School =

Secondary school in British Columbia, Canada

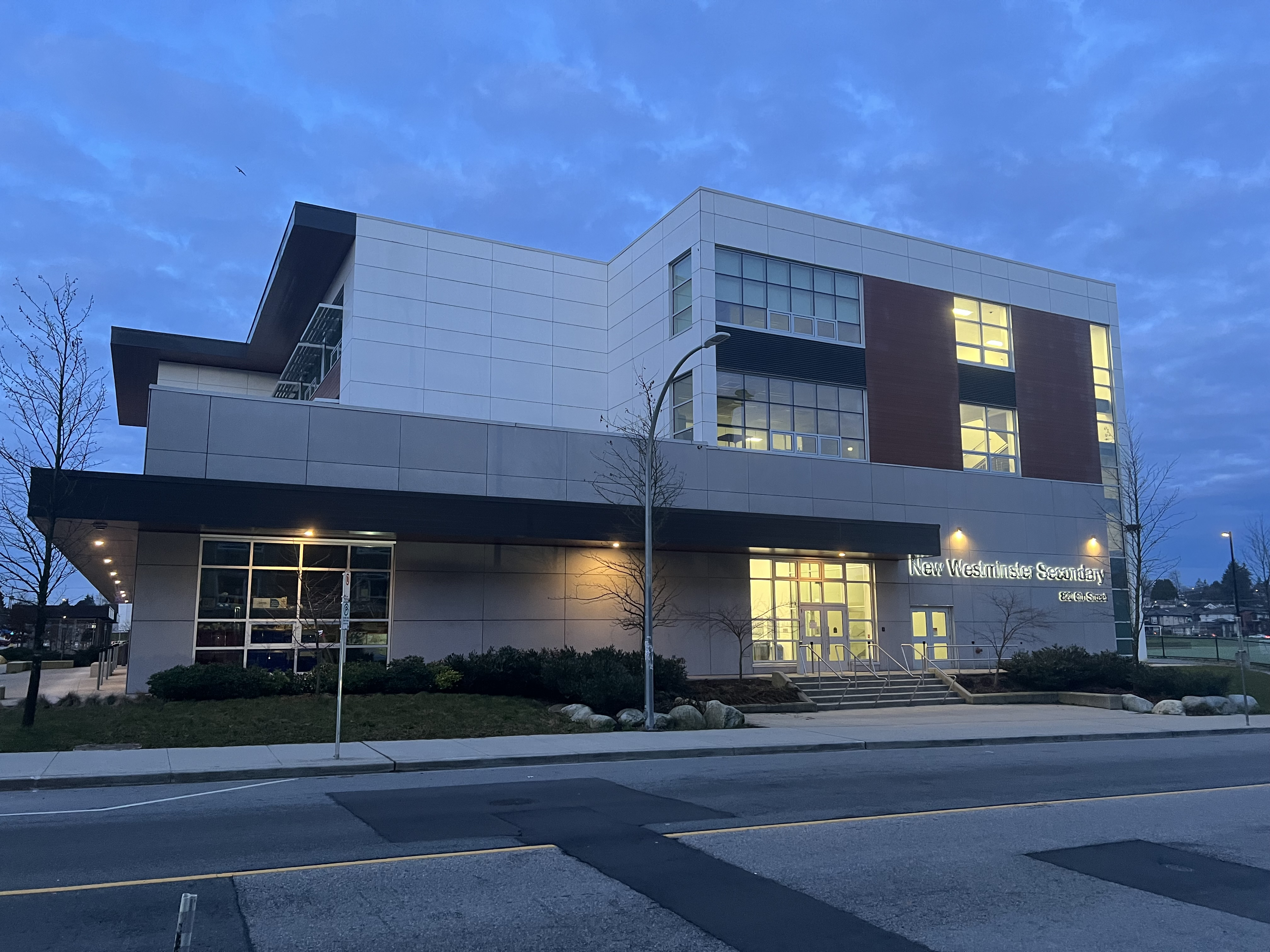

Location
- 820 Sixth Street; New Westminster, British Columbia, V3M 3S9; Canada; 49.216550°N 122.926879°W

Information
- School type: Public, secondary school
- Motto: For Leadership and Work
- Founded: 1960
- School board: School District 40 New Westminster
- Superintendent: Mark Davidson
- School number: 10099001
- Principal: Susana Quan
- Staff: >180
- Grades: 9 to 12
- Enrollment: 2244 (2023/2024)
- Language: English and French
- Area: Metro Vancouver
- Colour
- Team name: New Westminster Hyacks
- Website: www.nwss.ca
- Last updated: May 1, 2024

New Westminster Secondary School (NWSS) is a secondary school in New Westminster, British Columbia, Canada. It is one of the largest high schools in British Columbia. It includes grades 9 through 12. The school is home to the International Baccalaureate program and a one year apprenticeship program. In 2007, Fraser Institute ranked the school well within the top 50 secondary schools in British Columbia out of the 279 public and private secondary schools operating in the province. The campus encompasses an area of three city blocks by two city blocks.

== History ==
Prior to the 1860s, the site of the present school was a public cemetery where many of the prominent citizens of New Westminster were interred. Many of these citizens were Chinese, Sikh, or Indigenous. After development in the 1870s the remains of those buried were transferred to the Fraser Cemetery, elsewhere in the city. During World War II, the corner of 10th Avenue and 8th, where the present school is located, was leased to the Federal Government. The site served as a soldiers' barracks, used for training and housing the Royal Westminster Regiment. After the war, the barracks were moved to the University of British Columbia and the rest of the cemetery was demolished. Finally, in 1948, the public works yard was moved and the site was transferred to the New Westminster School Board for the construction of offices and a new high school.

In September 1949, Vincent Massey Junior High was unofficially opened by Premier Bryan I. Johnson. On December 16, 1949, the school was officially opened. It was named after the Right Honourable Vincent Massey, the eighteenth Governor General of Canada. The adjoining Pearson wing, named after the Right Honourable Lester Pearson, former Canadian Prime Minister, was home to the Senior High School prior to the two becoming amalgamated into the present New Westminster Secondary School.

== Academics ==
The NWSS International Baccalaureate (IB) program is a pre-university course of studies offered at NWSS since 2000. The school offers both the Diploma Program (DP) and the Certificate Program (CP).

The school has an ESL program for students whose second language is English. This program is offered to many international students. A French immersion program includes classes purely taught in French. This is the continuation of the Glenbrook Middle School late French immersion program. In this program, students are expected to speak French in most classes, and, upon finishing it, have almost native fluency.

== School facilities and resources ==
=== Sports teams ===
New Westminster Secondary School has more than 13 sports teams, including:

- American football (junior boys, senior boys)
- Soccer (junior, senior)
- Badminton (junior, senior)
- Volleyball (juvenile, junior, senior)
- Basketball (juvenile, junior, senior)
- Field hockey (girls)
- Cross-country (junior, senior)
- Track and field (junior, senior)
- Field lacrosse (junior, senior)
- Wrestling (juvenile, junior, senior)
- Tennis (everyone)
- Golf (everyone)
- Table tennis (everyone, all ages combined)

== School redevelopment ==
The New Westminster School District announced plans for the replacement of the New Westminster Secondary School (NWSS). NWSS will continue to be the biggest school in the province of British Columbia with this largest and most complex construction project in the history of the province.

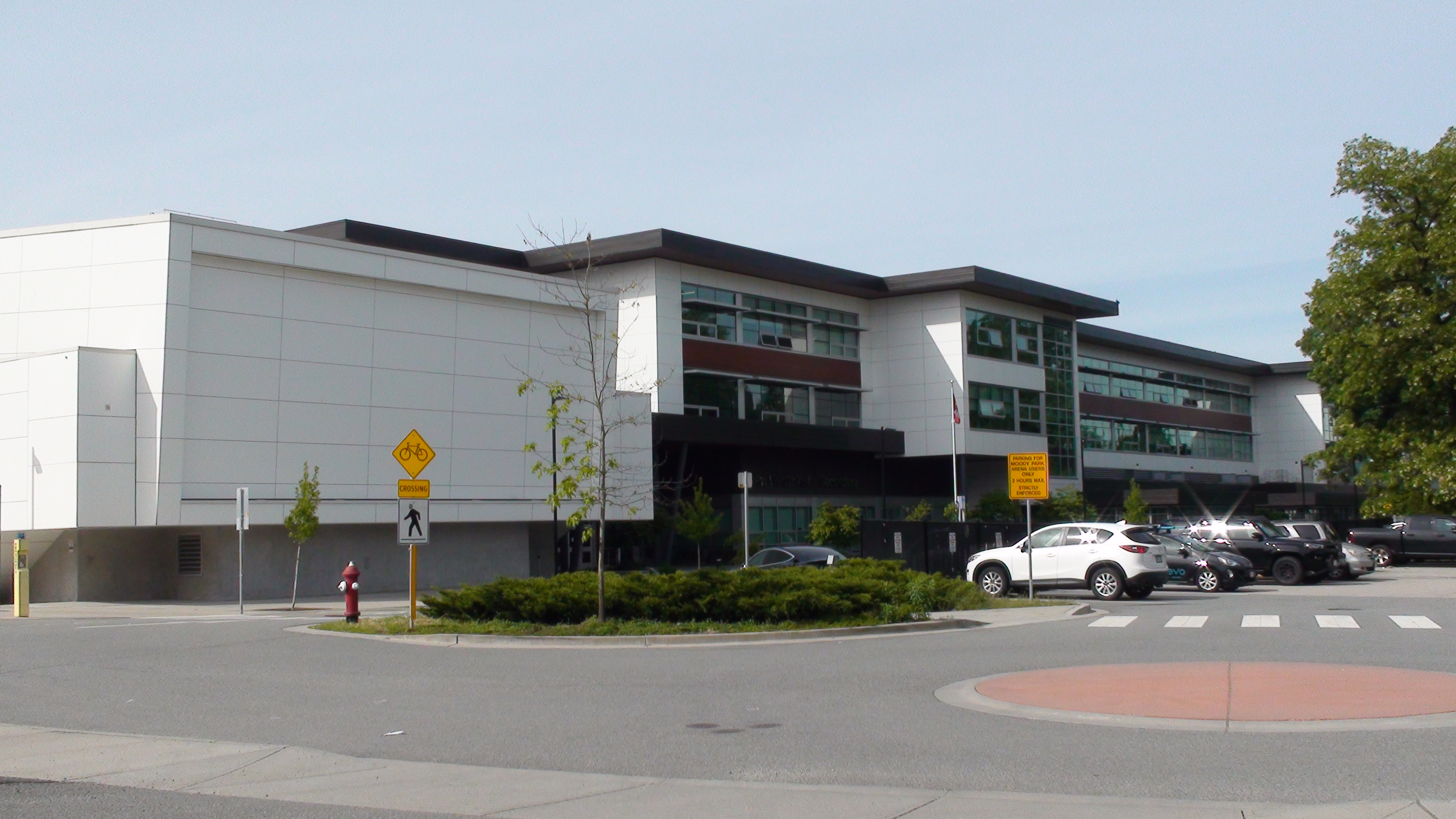
New Westminster Secondary School

Minister of Education Mike Bernier came to New Westminster on Tuesday, June 7, 2016, to announce the long-awaited funding approval for the New Westminster Secondary School replacement project. The $106.5 million replacement of New Westminster Secondary School was completed near the end of the summer of 2020. This $106.5 million budget for the new school is the largest budget in BC history to be allocated to a school. The new school is now home for over two thousand grade 9 to 12 students as of 2024. The new school has been designed to meet the modern standards for safety, accessibility and learning.

== Notable alumni ==
- Josh Byrne – professional lacrosse player (Buffalo Bandits; Chaos LC)
- Felix Cartal – musician and DJ
- Todd Ewen – professional National Hockey League player (1985–2000)
- Peter Julian – Canadian Member of Parliament for the New Democratic Party
- Kasey Lum – director
- Eva Markvoort – Miss New Westminster 2002
- Justin Morneau – Major League Baseball player of the Minnesota Twins, and MVP winner
- Jamila Pomeroy – writer, director, actor
- Bill Ranford – professional National Hockey League player; four time Stanley Cup (active player and twice as goaltending coach) and Conn Smythe Trophy winner (1990 Stanley Cup Final)

== Filming location ==
- NWSS was the main filming location for the five-season television series 21 Jump Street.
- NWSS is the main filming location for the videos used in the Premier Go Program.
- NWSS was the main filming location in 2015 for the short film "That's So Straight".
