= New West Progressives =

Municipal political party in New Westminster, British Columbia

- Active municipal party
- Abbreviation: NWP
- President: Alysia Ker
- Founded: 2017; 9 years ago
- Ideology: Fiscal conservatism; Cultural conservatism
- Political position: Centre-right to right-wing
- Colours: Blue, green
- Mayor and Council: 6 / 7
- School Board: 6 / 7

Website
- https://www.nwprogress.ca/
- Politics of British Columbia; Political parties; Elections; Information correct as of October 17, 2026

The New West Progressives (NWP) are a municipal political party in the city of New Westminster, British Columbia. The party was originally formed as a citizen-led, non-partisan and not-for-profit association in 2017 whose purpose was to contest elections in the city; however, since 2018 they are a political party certified by Elections BC (according to their homepage). The NWP have no formal affiliations with other political parties at the municipal, provincial, or federal level. They were the first municipal political party to be formed in New Westminster.

While the party's name might suggest that they follow the political principles of progressivism, the party is generally described as being conservative, sitting to the right of labour-endorsed centre-left to left-wing candidates. Their principle opponent in civic elections is Community First New West, an affiliate of the New Democratic Party.

== History ==
The New West Progressives were founded in 2017 as the New Westminster Progressive Electors Coalition, in preparation for the 2018 British Columbia municipal elections. The party was formed in response to a perceived lack of ideological diversity in city council, as the mayor and every councillor elected for the 2014–2018 term shared similar beliefs, and were all endorsed by the New Westminster and District Labour Council, an affiliate of the Canadian Labour Congress.

During their campaign, the party was criticized for using terminology and an orange colour scheme more commonly associated with left-wing politics in Canada, and were accused by members of the community for trying to trick voters into voting for a more conservative platform.

In the party's first election, they did not nominate a candidate for the mayoral election, and instead focused on the city council and school board elections. In their first election, their top candidate for city council, Daniel Fontaine, received 5,297 votes, but ultimately finished seventh and was not elected. Danielle Connelly, a NWP candidate for the school board, placed sixth in the election after receiving 5,626 votes, and became the first member of the party to hold an elected position in New Westminster.

Prior to the 2022 general election, the party began a stronger campaign and nominated a mayoral candidate, Ken Armstrong, for the first time. The New West Progressives were ultimately unsuccessful in the mayoral election, with Armstrong losing to Patrick Johnstone by 1,449 votes. However, they were able to elect two candidates as city councillors, with Paul Minhas and Daniel Fontaine placing fifth and sixth respectively. Fontaine's electoral victory made him the first known Métis and Indigenous member of the New Westminster City Council. Connelly retained her seat as the sole NWP party member on the school board.

On September 18, 2025, the party nominated Daniel Fontaine as their mayoral candidate for the upcoming 2026 British Columbia municipal elections. In the election, Fontaine was elected as mayor and the NWP won six of the seven city council seats (including the mayor), forming a majority government for the first time.

== Election results ==
=== General elections ===
Election	Mayoral election				City council election			School board election		
Election	Candidate	Votes	%	Result	Candidates	Elected (Note: Number of seats includes the party's mayoral candidate if they were also elected.)	Status (Note: Unlike the House of Commons of Canada or the Legislative assemblies of Canadian provinces and territories, municipal political caucuses in New Westminster are not officically recognized. The label of majority government, minority government, or opposition is a de-facto distinction, and is not legally recognized.)	Candidates	Elected	Status
2018	No candidate nominated				4	0 / 7	No seats	4	1 / 7	Opposition
2022	Ken Armstrong	5,227	33.05	Lost (2nd)	5+1	2 / 7	Opposition	3	1 / 7	Opposition
2026	Daniel Fontaine	12,361 (Note: Preliminary result)	54.96	Won	6+1	6 / 7	Majority government	7	6 / 7	Majority government

=== By-elections ===
Date	Type	Candidate	%	Result	Status
February 3, 2024	School board	Kathleen Carlsen	41.24	▲ Won	Opposition
