= Colin Basran =

Canadian politician (born 1977)

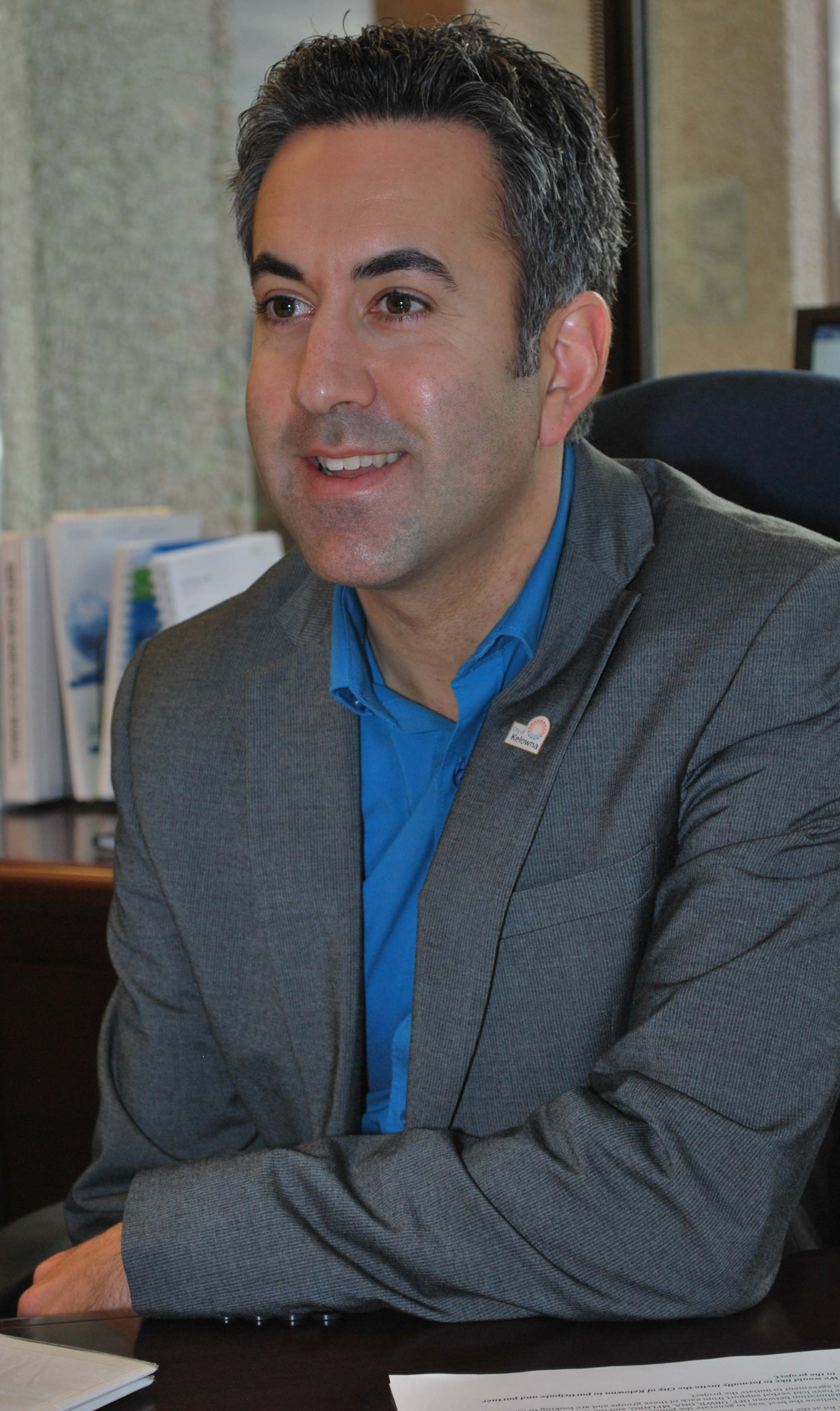
- Basran in 2015

Mayor of Kelowna
- In office December 1, 2014 – November 7, 2022
- Preceded by: Walter Gray
- Succeeded by: Tom Dyas

Personal details
- Born: Colin G. Basran; November 14, 1977 (age 48) Kelowna, British Columbia, Canada
- Profession: journalist, realtor, mayor

Colin G. Basran (born November 14, 1977) is a Canadian politician who served as the mayor of Kelowna from 2014 to 2022.

== Political career ==
Basran was first elected to Kelowna City Council as a city councillor in the 2011 municipal election. Basran was elected Mayor in the 2014 British Columbia municipal elections, making Basran the youngest elected mayor of Kelowna. He was also the first Sikh mayor of Kelowna.

He served for two terms, until he was defeated in the 2022 municipal election by Tom Dyas, who won 62.17% of the vote, over Basran's 31.87%.

== Mayoralty ==
During Basran’s time in office, Kelowna’s crime rate grew to become the highest of all Canadian metropolitan areas, and its homelessness population quadrupled.

In 2019, Kelowna's Royal Canadian Mounted Police was found to dismiss 40 percent of sexual assault claims (triple the provincial and national average) after a woman reported that she was raped by three people at age 15. When she reported it to the Kelowna RCMP, she said her file was closed after a cursory investigation, which consisted of the police "simply calling her assailant and asking if he was guilty"

In response to the statistic, Basran defended the RCMP, saying that the assaults were properly investigated.

== Election Controversies ==
The year before he won re-election as Kelowna's mayor for a second term, Basran collected over $30,000 in political donations but did not report it to Elections BC until the shortfall was reported by a campaign donor. Largely, the previously unreported donations came from development firms. When asked where the funds went, Basran refused to say how the funds were spent.

Basran raised conflict of interest concerns when it was reported that he rented a multimillion-dollar waterfront home directly from one of B.C.'s biggest real estate developers, despite earning a salary as Mayor of Kelowna of $113,690 per year

During Basran's kickoff event to his failed 2022 campaign run, Basran was witnessed verbally assaulting political rival Ron Cannan by swearing at Cannan and kicking him out of the event.

== Sexual assault charge ==
On December 7, 2022, the British Columbia Prosecution Service (BCPS) announced that Basran was charged with sexual assault in connection with an incident to have occurred in May 2022, while he was still Mayor of Kelowna. The police investigation was conducted by the Kelowna RCMP and reviewed by the Nelson Police Department. The charge was stayed on June 22, 2023.
