= Kelowna City Council =

Governing body of the city of Kelowna, British Columbia, Canada

Type
- Type: Unicameral municipal council

History
- Founded: 1905

Leadership
- Mayor: Tom Dyas since November 7, 2022
- Seats: 1 mayor and 8 city councillors

Elections
- Last general election: October 17, 2026; Members to be sworn-in on November 2, 2026
- Next general election: October 19, 2030

Kelowna City Council is the governing body of the city of Kelowna, British Columbia, Canada. The council consist of the mayor and eight elected city councillors who represent the city. Municipal elections are held every four years across the province on the third Saturday of October.

== 2026–present ==
Elected in the 2026 municipal elections
Mayor: Tom Dyas
Councillors: Mohini Singh, Rick Webber, Gord Lovegrove, Davis Kyle, Kevin Kraft, Brady Rogers, Laura Thurnheer, Les Bellamy

== 2022–2026 ==
Elected in the 2022 municipal elections
Mayor: Tom Dyas
Councillors: Charlie Hodge, Mohini Singh, Maxine DeHart, Luke Stack, Loyal Wooldridge, Ron Cannan, Rick Webber, Gord Lovegrove

== 2018–2022 ==
- Vote Results

Mayor: Colin Basran
Councillors: Charlie Hodge, Mohini Singh, Ryan Donn, Gail Given, Maxine DeHart, Brad Sieben, Luke Stack, Loyal Wooldridge

== 2014–2018 ==
- Vote Results

Mayor: Colin Basran
Councillors: Charlie Hodge, Mohini Singh, Ryan Donn, Gail Given, Maxine DeHart, Brad Sieben, Tracy Gray, Luke Stack

== 2011–2014 ==
Mayor: Walter Gray
Councillors: Robert Hobson, Gail Given, Colin Basran, Andre Blanleil, Luke Stack, Mohini Singh, Maxine DeHart, Gerry Zimmermann.

== 2008–2011 ==
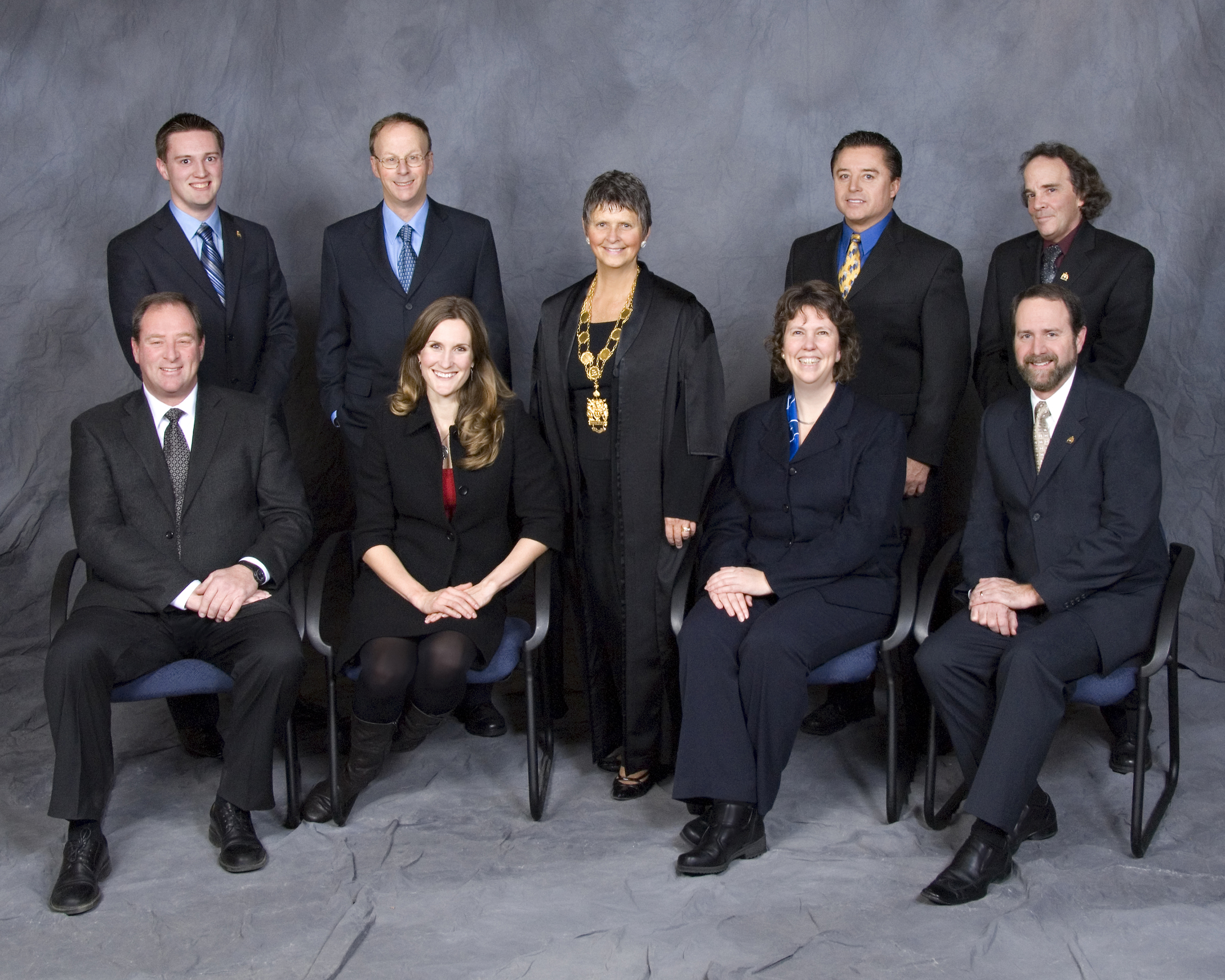
2008-2011 Back (l-r): Kevin Craig, Robert Hobson, Mayor Sharon Shepherd, Andre Blanleil, Charlie Hodge Front (l-r): Graeme James, Angela Reid, Michele Rule, Luke Stack

- Vote Results

Mayor: Sharon Shepherd
Councillors: Robert Hobson, Brian Given, Andre Blanleil, Angela Reid, Michele Rule, Graeme James, Luke Stack, Charlie Hodge.

- As of the November 2009 by-election; Kevin Craig has replaced Brian Given.
- By-Election Results

== 2005–2008 ==
2005-2008 Back (l-r): Colin Day, Andre Blanleil, Mayor Sharon Shepherd, Robert Hobson, Norm Letnick Front (l-r): Brian Given, Michele Rule, Carol Gran, Barrie Clark

- Vote Results
- Mayor: Sharon Shepherd
- Councillors: Robert Hobson, Brian Given, Carol Gran, Michele Rule, Colin Day, Andre Blanleil, Norm Letnick, Barrie Clark

== 2002–2005 ==
- Vote Results
- Mayor: Walter Gray
- Councillors: Robert Hobson, Brian Given, Al Horning, Ron Cannan, Colin Day, Andre Blanleil, Sharon Shepherd, Barrie Clarke.

== 1999–2002 ==
Mayor: Walter Gray
Councillors: Robert Hobson, Brian Given, Ron Cannan, Colin Day, Andre Blanleil, Sharon Shepherd, Smiley Nelson.

== 1996–1999 ==
Mayor: Walter Gray
Councillors: Robert Hobson, Joe Leask, Ron Cannan, Colin Day, Andre Blanleil, Sharon Shepherd, Smiley Nelson, Marion Bremner.

== 1993–1996 ==
Mayor: James Stuart
Councillors: Robert Hobson, Colin Day, Andre Blanleil, Joe Leask, Ben Lee, Henry Markgraf, Shirley Staley, Marion Bremner.

== 1988–1993 ==
Mayor: James Stuart
Councillors: Robert Hobson, Marion Bremner. Further Councillors Unknown.
