= 2022 British Columbia municipal elections =

Canadian municipal elections

- 15 October 2022
- Turnout: 955,193

The 2022 British Columbia municipal elections were held on 15 October 2022. Municipal elections took place in all municipalities and regional district electoral areas in the Canadian province of British Columbia to elect mayors, school board trustees, rural directors and city councillors. Elections BC administered campaign financing, disclosure and advertisement of candidates; however, voting, ballots and candidate nominations were administered by each jurisdiction's local electoral officer.

The 2022 municipal elections saw a wave of centre-right mayors come to office, such as Ken Sim in Vancouver, Tom Dyas in Kelowna and Reid Hamer-Jackson in Kamloops, as a response to rising crime and homelessness in the province.

Mayors are elected using the first-past-the-post election system. City councillors, trustees and directors are elected using plurality block voting, where each voter has the right to cast up to as many votes as there are seats to fill.

Incumbents marked with "(X)". Candidates who were elected are listed in boldface and accompanied by a †.

== Abbotsford ==
=== Mayoral election ===
The results for mayor of Abbotsford were as follows:

Party	Mayoral candidate	Votes	%
Independent	**Ross Siemens** †	**16,037**	**64.41**
Independent	Manjit Sohi	7,705	30.95
Independent	Paul Pellikaan	627	2.52
Independent	Troy Gaspar	529	2.12

=== Abbotsford City Council election ===
The results for Abbotsford City Council were as follows:

Top 8 candidates elected

Party	Council candidate	Votes	%
**Independent**	**Dave Sidhu** (X) †	**14,419**	**10.33**
**Independent**	**Patricia Ross** (X) †	**11,144**	**7.98**
**Independent**	**Les Barkman** (X) †	**10,563**	**7.56**
**Independent**	**Patricia Driessen** †	**9,507**	**6.81**
**Abbotsford First**	**Mark Warkentin** †	**9,437**	**6.76**
**Abbotsford First**	**Kelly Chahal** (X) †	**9,156**	**6.56**
**Independent**	**Dave Loewen** (X) †	**8,633**	**6.18**
**Independent**	**Simon Gibson** †	**8,400**	**6.01**
Abbotsford First	Sandy Blue (X)	8,330	5.96
Independent	Bharathi Sandhu	6,761	4.84
Independent	Alex Mitchell	6,731	4.82
Abbotsford First	Gurnoor Sidhu	6,428	4.60
Independent	Dao Tran	6,176	4.42
Independent	Jas Anand	4,585	3.28
Independent	Tom Norton	3,872	2.77
Independent	Amritpal Mund	3,296	2.36
Independent	Reann Gasper	3,244	2.32
Independent	David McLauren	3,038	2.18
Independent	David Evans	2,997	2.15
Independent	Tim Felger	1,844	1.32
Independent	Steve Pimm	1,090	0.78

== Armstrong ==
The results in Armstrong were as follows:

=== Mayoral election ===
Mayoral candidate	Vote	%
**Joe Cramer** †	Acclaimed	

== Bulkley-Nechako A (Smithers Rural) Electoral Area ==
The results in Regional District of Bulkley-Nechako Electoral Area A (Smithers Rural) were as follows:

=== Director election ===
Director candidate	Vote	%
**Stoney Stoltenberg** †	Acclaimed	

== Burnaby ==
2022 Burnaby municipal election

8 seats on Burnaby City Council + 1 mayor (5 seats needed for majority)
- Mayoral election
	First party
Candidate	Mike Hurley
Party	Independent
Leader's seat	Mayor
Popular vote	Acclaimed
Mayor before election
Mike Hurley
Independent
Elected mayor
Mike Hurley
Independent
- City council election
Party	Seats	+/–
Burnaby Citizens Association	6	−1
Burnaby Green Party	1	0
One Burnaby	1	+1
This lists parties that won seats. See the complete results below.

=== Mayoral election ===
The results for mayor of Burnaby were as follows:

Party	Mayoral candidate	Votes	%
**Independent**	**Mike Hurley** (X) †	Acclaimed	

=== Burnaby City Council election ===
The results for Burnaby City Council were as follows:

Top 8 candidates elected

Party	Council candidate	Vote	%
**Burnaby Citizens Association**	**Alison Gu** (X) †	**17,340**	**8.08**
**Burnaby Citizens Association**	**James Wang** (X) †	**13,024**	**6.07**
**Burnaby Citizens Association**	**Pietro Calendino** (X) †	**12,494**	**5.82**
**Burnaby Citizens Association**	**Sav Dhaliwal** (X) †	**12,335**	**5.74**
**Burnaby Green Party**	**Joe Keithley** (X) †	**11,383**	**5.30**
**Burnaby Citizens Association**	**Maita Santiago** †	**11,347**	**5.28**
**One Burnaby**	**Richard T. Lee** †	**11,231**	**5.23**
**Burnaby Citizens Association**	**Daniel Tetrault** †	**10,891**	**5.07**
Burnaby Citizens Association	Rohini Arora	10,511	4.89
Burnaby Citizens Association	Antara Deb	9,962	4.64
One Burnaby	Mike Hillman (X)	9,710	4.52
Burnaby Green Party	Carrie McLaren	8,276	3.85
One Burnaby	Brea Huang Sami	7,926	3.69
One Burnaby	Mona Grewal	7,231	3.37
One Burnaby	Richard N. Liu	7,200	3.35
Independent	Ken Arnold	6,912	3.22
Burnaby Green Party	Jasmine Nicholsfigueiredo	6,723	3.13
One Burnaby	Mario Miceli	6,477	3.02
Independent	Heymann Yip	6,328	2.95
Burnaby Green Party	Tara Shushtarian	6,215	2.89
Independent	Martin Kendell	5,047	2.35
Independent	Scott Van Denham	3,476	1.62
Independent	Tom Tao	3,192	1.49
Independent	Deborah Skerry	2,730	1.27
Independent	Gulam Firdos	2,398	1.12
Independent	Konstantine Roccas	2,235	1.04
Independent	MichaelAngelo RobinHood	2,140	1.00

== Campbell River ==
The results in Campbell River were as follows:

=== Mayoral election ===
Mayoral candidate	Vote	%
**Kermit Dahl** †	**5,468**	**53.07**
Larry Samson	3,414	33.13
Charlie Cornfield	919	8.92
Saron Gebresellassi	418	4.06
Michael Calhoun	85	0.82

== Cariboo A (Red Bluff - Quesnel South) Electoral Area ==
The results in Cariboo Regional District Electoral Area A (Red Bluff - Quesnel South) were as follows:

=== Director election ===
Director candidate	Vote	%
**Mary F. Sjostrom** (X) †	Acclaimed	

== Cariboo G (Lac la Hache - 108 Mile Ranch) Electoral Area ==
The results in Cariboo Regional District Electoral Area G (Lac la Hache - 108 Mile Ranch) were as follows:

=== Director election ===
Director candidate	Vote	%
**Al F. Richmond** (X) †	Acclaimed	

== Castlegar ==
The results in Castlegar were as follows:

=== Mayoral election ===
Mayoral candidate	Vote	%
**Maria McFaddin** †	**920**	**50.14**
Lawrence Chernoff	915	49.86

== Central Kootenay H (The Slocan Valley) Electoral Area ==
The results in the Regional District of Central Kootenay Electoral Area H (The Slocan Valley) were as follows:

=== Director election ===
Director candidate	Vote	%
**Walter Popoff** (X) †	Acclaimed	

== Central Saanich ==
The results in Central Saanich were as follows:

=== Mayoral election ===
Mayoral candidate	Vote	%
**Ryan Windsor** (X) †	Acclaimed	

== Chilliwack ==
=== Mayoral election ===
The results for mayor of Chilliwack were as follows:

Mayoral candidate	Vote	%
**Ken Popove** (X) †	**12,028**	**74.78**
Ian Carmichael	4,056	25.22

=== Chilliwack City Council election ===
The results for Chilliwack City Council were as follows:

Top 6 candidates elected

Council candidate	Vote	%
**Jason Lum** (X) †	**10,766**	**13.27**
**Chris Kloot** (X) †	**9,482**	**11.69**
**Nicole Huitema Read** †	**9,153**	**11.28**
**Jeff Shields** (X) †	**8,622**	**10.63**
**Harv Westeringh** (X) †	**8,048**	**9.92**
**Bud Mercer** (X) †	**7,970**	**9.82**
Amber Price	7,488	9.23
Jared Mumford	6,013	7.41
Mike McLatchy	4,709	5.80
Debora Soutar	4,673	5.76
Brent Bowker	3,191	3.93
Craig Hill	1,029	1.27

== Coldstream ==
The results in Coldstream were as follows:

=== Mayoral election ===
Mayoral candidate	Vote	%
**Ruth Hoyte** †	Acclaimed	

== Columbia-Shuswap C (Eagle Bay, White Lake, Tappen, Sunnybrae) Electoral Area ==
The results in Columbia-Shuswap Regional District Electoral Area C (Eagle Bay, White Lake, Tappen, Sunnybrae) were as follows:

=== Director election ===
Director candidate	Vote	%
Marty Gibbons		
Nicholas Najda		

== Colwood ==
The results in Colwood were as follows:

=== Mayoral election ===
Mayoral candidate	Vote	%
**Doug Kobayashi** †	**2,559**	**67.4**
Rob Martin (X)	1,216	32.6

== Comox ==
The results in Comox were as follows:

=== Mayoral election ===
Mayoral candidate	Vote	%
**Nicole Minions** †	Acclaimed	

== Comox Valley A (Baynes Sound-Denman/Hornby Islands) Electoral Area ==
The results in Comox Valley Regional District Electoral Area A (Baynes Sound-Denman/Hornby Islands) were as follows:

=== Director election ===
Director candidate	Vote	%
**Daniel Arbour** (X) †	**1807**	**80.2**
Gordon Kennedy	99	4.3
Tamara Meggitt	346	15.3

== Comox Valley B (Lazo North) Electoral Area ==
The results in Comox Valley Regional District Electoral Area B (Lazo North) were as follows:

=== Director election ===
Director candidate	Vote	%
Arzeena Hamir (X)	743	46.5
**Richard Hardy** †	**766**	**47.9**
Keith Stevens	89	5.6

== Comox Valley C (Puntledge - Black Creek) Electoral Area ==
The results in Comox Valley Regional District Electoral Area C (Puntledge - Black Creek) were as follows:

=== Director election ===
Director candidate	Vote	%
**Edwin Grieve** (X) †	1039	74.5
Matthew Ellis	356	25.5

== Coquitlam ==
=== Mayoral election ===
The results for mayor of Coquitlam were as follows:

Mayoral candidate	Vote	%
**Richard Stewart** (X) †	**14,105**	**69.52**
Adel Gamar	5,367	26.45
Mark Mahovlich	818	4.03

=== Coquitlam City Council election ===
The results for Coquitlam City Council were as follows:

Top 8 candidates elected

Council candidate	Vote	%
**Craig Hodge** (X) †	**10,799**	**8.48**
**Teri Towner** (X) †	**9,945**	**7.81**
**Steve Kim** (X) †	**9,154**	**7.19**
**Brent Asmundson** (X) †	**8,962**	**7.03**
**Matt Djonlic** †	**8,925**	**7.01**
**Trish Mandewo** (X) †	**8,910**	**6.99**
**Robert Mazzarolo** †	**8,791**	**6.90**
**Dennis Marsden** (X) †	**8,702**	**6.83**
Harvey Su	7,238	5.68
Paul Lambert	6,303	4.95
Ben Craig	5,366	4.21
Zoë Royer	5,041	3.96
Leslie Roosa	4,644	3.65
Benjamin Perry	4,272	3.35
Sean Lee	3,997	3.14
Carl Trepanier	3,951	3.10
Rob Bottos	3,703	2.91
Ali Tootian	2,797	2.20
Phillip Buchan	2,306	1.81
Mo Darwish	1,450	1.14
Cameron McBryer	1,208	0.95
Brian Misera	933	0.73

== Courtenay ==
The results in Courtenay were as follows:

=== Mayoral election ===
Mayoral candidate	Vote	%
**Bob Wells** (X) †	**3,277**	**56.21**
Erik Eriksson	1,802	30.91
Aaron Dowker	751	12.88

=== Council election ===
Council candidate	Vote	%
**Doug Hillian** (X) †	**3,067**	**51.8**
**Will Cole-Hamilton** (X) †	**3,066**	**51.7**
**Evan Jolicoeur** †	**3,049**	**51.4**
**Melanie McCollum** (X) †	**2,920**	**49.3**
**Wendy Morin** (X) †	**2,868**	**48.4**
**David Frisch** (X) †	**2,448**	**41.3**
Brennan Day	2,223	37.5
Jin Lin	2,150	36.3
Manno Theos (X)	2,118	34.7
Starr Winchester	2,056	34.7
Deana Simkin	1,479	24.9
Phil Adams	977	16.5
Michael Gilbert	796	13.4
Steffan Chmuryk	702	11.8
Lindsey Northcott	684	11.5

== Cowichan Valley B (Shawnigan Lake) Electoral Area ==
The results in Cowichan Valley Regional District Electoral Area B (Shawnigan Lake) were as follows:

=== Director election ===
Director candidate	Vote	%
Sierra Acton (X)		
Kathy L. Code		

== Cowichan Valley C (Cobble Hill) Electoral Area ==
The results in Cowichan Valley Regional District Electoral Area C (Cobble Hill) were as follows:

=== Director election ===
Director candidate	Vote	%
Mike E. Wilson (X)		
David Slade		

== Cranbrook ==
The results in Cranbrook were as follows:

=== Mayoral election ===
Mayoral candidate	Vote	%
**Wayne Price** †	**2,721**	**60.0**
Lee Pratt (X)	1,758	40.0

== Creston ==
The results in Creston were as follows:

=== Mayoral election ===
Mayoral candidate	Vote	%
**Arnold F. DeBoon** †	**1,082**	**66.4**
Nora Maddocks	474	29.1
Jim Rota	57	3.5

== Dawson Creek ==
The results in Dawson Creek were as follows:

=== Mayoral election ===
Mayoral candidate	Vote	%
**Darcy A. Dober** †	**1,855**	**84.9**
Shaely A. Wilbur	304	13.9

== Delta ==
=== Mayoral election ===
The results for mayor Delta are follows:

Party	Mayoral candidate	Vote	%
**Achieving for Delta**	**George Harvie** (X) †	**17,050**	**77.00**
Independent	Peter van der Velden	3,751	16.94
Independent	Joginder Randhawa	1,341	6.06

=== Delta City Council election ===
The results for Delta City Council were as follows:

Top 6 candidates elected

Party	Council candidate	Vote	%
**Achieving for Delta**	**Alicia Guichon** (X) †	**16,533**	**14.60**
**Achieving for Delta**	**Dylan Kruger** (X) †	**14,242**	**12.58**
**Achieving for Delta**	**Daniel Boisvert** †	**14,130**	**12.48**
**Achieving for Delta**	**Jennifer Johal** †	**12,788**	**11.29**
**Achieving for Delta**	**Rod Binder** †	**12,626**	**11.15**
**Achieving for Delta**	**Jessie Dosanjh** †	**12,582**	**11.11**
Independent	Brian Read	5,772	5.10
Independent	Maha Balakumar	5,005	4.42
Independent	Pamela Swanigan	4,778	4.22
Independent	Moneca Kolvyn	4,387	3.87
Independent	Duncan Callander	3,812	3.37
Independent	Julien Jacques	3,340	2.95
Independent	Stephan Sun	3,248	2.87

== Duncan ==
The results in Duncan were as follows:

=== Mayoral election ===
Mayoral candidate	Vote	%
**Michelle P. Staples** (X) †	Acclaimed	

== East Kootenay C Electoral Area ==
The results in the Regional District of East Kootenay Electoral Area C were as follows:

=== Director election ===
Director candidate	Vote	%
**Rob C. Gay** (X) †	Acclaimed	

== Esquimalt ==
The results in Esquimalt were as follows:

=== Mayoral election ===
Mayoral candidate	Vote	%
**Barb Desjardins** (X) †	**1,908**	**56.6**
Sonya Gracey	1,433	42.5

== Fernie ==
The results in Fernie were as follows:

=== Mayoral election ===
Mayoral candidate	Vote	%
**Nic Milligan** †	**1,701**	**68.67**
Ange Qualizza (X)	776	31.33

== Fort St. John ==
The results in Fort St. John were as follows:

=== Mayoral election ===
Mayoral candidate	Vote	%
**Lilia Hansen** †	**1,620**	**63.1**
Shannon Stange	737	28.7
Steven Labossiere	156	6.1

=== Fort St. John City Council election ===
The results for Fort St. John City Council were as follows:

Top 6 candidates elected

Council candidate	Vote	%
**Trevor Bolin** (X) †	**1,715**	**66.81**
**Gord Klassen** (X) †	**1,678**	**65.37**
**Sarah MacDougall** †	**1,675**	**65.25**
**Tony Zabinsky** (X) †	**1,539**	**59.95**
**Byron Stewart** (X) †	**1,530**	**59.60**
**Jim Lequiere** †	**1,528**	**59.52**
Lyle Goldie	798	31.09
Amy Cox	757	29.49
Gary Patara	492	19.17
Morgan Robinson	407	15.86
**Total Votes**	2,567	100.00
**Turnout**		18.00

== Gibsons ==
=== Mayoral election ===
The results for mayor of Gibsons were as follows:

Mayoral candidate	Votes	%
**Silas White** †	**1,241**	**84.14**
Leslie Thomson	196	13.29
Phil Yeung	38	2.58

=== Gibsons Town Council election ===
The results for Gibsons Town Council were as follows:

Top 4 candidates elected

Council candidate	Vote	%
**David Croal** (X) †	**870**	**57.77**
**Annemarie De Andrade** (X) †	**868**	**57.64**
**Christi Thompson** †	**826**	**54.85**
**Stafford Lumley** (X) †	**813**	**53.98**
Blake Macleod	649	43.09
Greig Soohen	510	33.86
Bob Morris	351	23.31
Desmond Delaney	311	20.65
**Turnout**	1,506	38.03

== Hope ==
The results in Hope were as follows:

=== Mayoral election ===
Mayoral candidate	Vote	%
**Victor A. Smith** †	**1,103**	**68.0**
Wilfried J. Vicktor	495	30.5

== Juan de Fuca Electoral Area ==
The results in Capital Regional District Electoral Area H (Juan de Fuca) were as follows:

=== Director election ===
Director candidate	Vote	%
**Al Wickheim** †	**703**	**62.16**
Sandy Sinclair	201	17.77
Derek Bishop	137	12.11
Shaunna Salsman	80	7.07

== Kamloops ==
=== Mayoral election ===
The results for mayor of Kamloops were as follows:

Mayoral candidate	Vote	%
**Reid Hamer-Jackson** †	**7,298**	**31.61**
Dieter Dudy	5,650	24.47
Sadie Hunter	4,578	19.83
Arjun Singh	2,932	12.70
Ray Dhaliwal	2,629	11.39

=== Kamloops City Council election ===
The results for Kamloops City Council were as follows:

Top 8 candidates elected

Council candidate	Vote	%
**Katie Neustaeter** †	**11,583**	**8.60**
**Bill Sarai** (X) †	**10,737**	**7.97**
**Mike O'Reilly** (X) †	**10,626**	**7.89**
**Kelly Hall** †	**9,544**	**7.09**
**Margot Middleton** †	**8,560**	**6.36**
**Dale Bass** (X) †	**8,245**	**6.12**
**Stephen Karpuk** †	**8,122**	**6.03**
**Nancy Bepple** †	**7,745**	**5.75**
Randy Sunderman	6,927	5.14
Caroline King	6,743	5.01
Dennis Griesbrecht	6,734	5.00
Darpan Sharma	5,919	4.40
Jesse Ritcey	5,894	4.38
Taj Sandur	5,848	4.34
Daphane Nelson	4,479	3.33
Jordan Proctor	4,289	3.19
Mac Gordon	2,903	2.16
Jamie Allen	2,616	1.94
Bonnie Cleland	2,450	1.82
George Dersch	1,877	1.39
Francois Lambert	1,312	0.97
Darrell LaRiviere	1,199	0.89
Reo Rocheleau	298	0.22

== Kelowna ==
=== Mayoral election ===
The results for mayor of Kelowna were as follows:

Mayoral candidate	Vote	%
**Tom Dyas** †	**21,110**	**62.17**
Colin Basran (X)	10,821	31.87
David Habib	1,518	4.47
Glendon Smedley	278	0.82
Silverado Socrates	226	0.67

=== Kelowna City Council election ===
The results for Kelowna City Council were as follows:

Top 8 candidates elected

Party	Council candidate	Vote	%
**Independent**	**Ron Cannan** †	**16,995**	**7.98**
**Independent**	**Loyal Wooldridge** (X) †	**14,579**	**6.84**
**Independent**	**Rick Webber** †	**11,656**	**5.47**
**Independent**	**Gord Lovegrove** †	**11,493**	**5.39**
**Independent**	**Mohini Singh** (X) †	**11,439**	**5.37**
**Independent**	**Luke Stack** (X) †	**11,307**	**5.31**
**Independent**	**Charlie Hodge** (X) †	**11,238**	**5.27**
**Independent**	**Maxine DeHart** (X) †	**11,115**	**5.22**
Independent	Davis Kyle	10,017	4.70
Independent	Gail Given (X)	9,408	4.42
Independent	Peter Truch	7,873	3.70
Independent	Susan Ames	7,455	3.50
Independent	Noel Wentworth	7,431	3.49
Independent	Bal Grewal	6,790	3.19
Independent	Elaine McMurray	6,259	2.94
Independent	Tom Macauley	5,542	2.60
Independent	James Kay	5,434	2.55
Independent	Indy Dhial	4,989	2.34
Independent	Amarit Brar	4,922	2.31
Spirit Alliance	Chris Williams	4,693	2.20
Independent	Amarjit Lalli	4,130	1.94
Independent	Dan Schlosser	4,124	1.94
Independent	Anthony Shephard	3,675	1.72
Spirit Alliance	Sacheen Collecutt	3,037	1.43
Independent	Christopher Bocskei	2,902	1.36
Independent	Brian Rogers	2,871	1.35
Independent	Daniel Joseph	2,699	1.27
Independent	Zach Sawatzky	2,416	1.13
Independent	D. Ben Norman	2,013	0.94
Independent	Greg Dahms	1,898	0.89
Independent	Chris Becenko	1,448	0.68
Independent	Darrin Fiddler	1,200	0.56

== Kent ==
The results in Kent were as follows:

=== Mayoral election ===
Mayoral candidate	Vote	%
**Sylvia Pranger** (X) †	Acclaimed	

== Kimberley ==
The results in Kimberley were as follows:

=== Mayoral election ===
Mayoral candidate	Vote	%
**Don McCormick** (X) †	Acclaimed	

== Kitimat ==
The results in Kitimat were as follows:

=== Mayoral election ===
Mayoral candidate	Vote	%
**Phil Germuth** (X) †	Acclaimed	

== Ladysmith ==
The results in Ladysmith were as follows:

=== Mayoral election ===
Mayoral candidate	Vote	%
**Aaron Stone** (X) †	Acclaimed	

== Lake Country ==
The results in Lake Country were as follows:

=== Mayoral election ===
Mayoral candidate	Vote	%
**Blair Ireland** †	Acclaimed	

== Langford ==
=== Mayoral election ===
The results for mayor of Langford were as follows:

Party	Mayoral candidate	Votes	%
**Independent**	**Scott Peter Goodmanson** †	**4,483**	**54.15**
Community First Langford	Stewart Young (X)	3,796	45.85

=== Langford City Council election ===
The results for Langford City Council were as follows:

Top 6 candidates elected

Party	Council candidate	Vote	%
**Langford Now**	**Colby Harder** †	**5,072**	**10.99**
**Langford Now**	**Mary Wagner** †	**4,844**	**10.49**
**Langford Now**	**Keith Yacucha** †	**4,579**	**9.92**
**Langford Now**	**Kimberley Guiry** †	**4,255**	**9.22**
**Langford Now**	**Mark Morley** †	**4,048**	**8.77**
**Independent**	**Lillian Szpak** (X) †	**3,512**	**7.61**
Independent	Wendy Hobbs	2,592	5.61
Community First Langford	Norma Stewart (X)	2,583	5.59
Community First Langford	Lanny Seaton (X)	2,547	5.52
Community First Langford	Shirley Ackland	2,540	5.50
Community First Langford	Matt Sahlstrom (X)	2,481	5.37
Community First Langford	Shannon Russell Willing	2,430	5.26
Independent	Denise Blackwell (X)	2,379	5.15
Community First Langford	Roger Wade (X)	2,309	5.00

== Langley City ==
The results in Langley City were as follows:

=== Mayoral election ===
Mayoral candidate	Vote	%
**Nathan J. Pachal** †	**2,434**	**65.36**
Val van den Broek (X)	1,290	34.64

=== Langley City Council election ===
The results for Langley City Council were as follows:

Top 8 candidates elected

Council candidate	Vote	%
**Paul Albrecht** (X) †	**1,905**	**50.42**
**Mike Solyom** †	**1,659**	**43.91**
**Rosemary H. Wallace** (X) †	**1,638**	**43.36**
**Teri James** (X) †	**1,614**	**42.72**
**Leith White** †	**1,525**	**40.37**
**Delaney Mack** †	**1,417**	**37.51**
Jeff D. Jacobs	1,415	37.45
Shelley F. Coburn	1,337	35.39
Rudy J. Storteboom	1,336	35.36
Gayle Martin	1,275	33.75
Cherise Okeymow	1,048	27.74
Jennifer Elderkin	1,020	27.00
David J. Stingl	973	25.75
Gurjit Dhillon	466	12.33
Total Votes	3,778	100.00
**Turnout**		18.40

=== School Board election ===
Trustee candidate	Vote	%
**Candy Ashdown** †	Acclaimed	
**Tony Ward** †	Acclaimed	

== Langley Township ==
=== Mayoral election ===
The results for mayor of Langley Township were as follows:

Party	Mayoral candidate	Votes	%
Contract With Langley	**Eric Woodward** †	**10,911**	**42.25**
Independent	Blair Whitmarsh	6,805	26.35
Elevate Langley	Rich Coleman	4,923	19.06
Independent	Michelle Sparrow	3,188	12.34

=== Langley District Council election ===
The results for Langley District Council were as follows:

Top 8 candidates elected

Party	Council candidate	Vote	%
**Contract With Langley**	**Barb Martens** †	**11,534**	**7.10**
**Independent**	**Margaret Kunst** (X) †	**10,484**	**6.46**
**Contract With Langley**	**Steve Ferguson** (X) †	**9,953**	**6.13**
**Contract With Langley**	**Misty Van Popta** †	**9,421**	**5.80**
**Contract With Langley**	**Rob Rindt** †	**9,418**	**5.80**
**Contract With Langley**	**Tim Baillie** †	**8,944**	**5.51**
**Independent**	**Kim Richter** (X) †	**8,756**	**5.39**
**Independent**	**Michael Pratt** †	**8,348**	**5.14**
Contract With Langley	AJ Cheema	7,631	4.70
Independent	Petrina Arnason (X)	7,484	4.61
Independent	Brit Gardner	6,728	4.14
Independent	Tony Ward	5,476	3.37
Independent	Teresa Townsley	5,374	3.31
Independent	Michael Chang	5,322	3.28
Elevate Langley	Scott Cameron	4,743	2.92
Elevate Langley	Cathy MacDonald	4,615	2.84
Independent	Rebecca Darnell	4,571	2.81
Elevate Langley	Stephen Dinesen	4,125	2.54
Independent	Carey Poitras	3,845	2.37
Elevate Langley	Sukhman Gill	3,539	2.18
Elevate Langley	Sierra Pilcher	3,449	2.12
Elevate Langley	Gerald Wartak	3,421	2.11
Independent	Karen Moraes	3,418	2.10
Elevate Langley	Navin Takhar	3,276	2.02
Elevate Langley	James Delorme	3,060	1.88
Independent	Alex Joehl	2,103	1.29
Independent	Kamil Respondek	2,004	1.23
Independent	Carlos Suarez Rubio	1,369	0.84

==== 2025 Langley District by-election ====
A by-election was held 25 October 2025 to replace Langley District councillor Misty Van Popta, who was elected to the Legislative Assembly of British Columbia in the 2024 British Columbia general election. She was forced to resign her council seat after the provincial government passed the Eligibility to Hold Public Office Act in May 2025 which banned the practice of holding provincial and municipal offices at the same time.

Party	Council candidate	Vote	%
**Independent**	**Blair Whitmarsh**	**3,107**	**52.63**
Independent	John Aldag	1,638	27.74
Independent	Resha Sabti	400	6.78
Independent	Paul Chhina	328	5.56
Independent	Val Van den Broek	215	3.64
Independent	Jami Watson	134	2.27
Independent	Saurabh Seth	82	1.39

== Maple Ridge ==
=== Mayoral election ===
The results for mayor of Maple Ridge were as follows:

Party	Mayoral candidate	Votes	%
**A Better Maple Ridge**	**Dan Ruimy** †	**6,306**	**43.88**
Maple Ridge First	Mike Morden (X)	4,321	30.07
Independent	Corisa Bell	2,799	19.48
Independent	Darleen Bernard	600	4.17
Independent	Jacques Blackstone	346	2.41

=== Maple Ridge City Council election ===
The results for Maple Ridge City Council were as follows:

Top 6 candidates elected

Party	Council candidate	Vote	%
**Independent**	**Ahmed Yousef** (X) †	**6,028**	**8.50**
**A Better Maple Ridge**	**Jenny Tan** †	**5,636**	**7.95**
**A Better Maple Ridge**	**Korleen Carreras** †	**5,438**	**7.67**
**A Better Maple Ridge**	**Sunny Schiller** †	**5,155**	**7.27**
**Maple Ridge First**	**Judy Dueck** (X) †	**5,018**	**7.08**
**A Better Maple Ridge**	**Onyeka Dozie** †	**4,881**	**6.89**
Maple Ridge First	Chelsa Meadus (X)	4,575	6.45
Maple Ridge First	Ryan Svendsen (X)	4,275	6.03
Independent	Robert Masse	3,936	5.55
Independent	Craig Speirs	3,524	4.97
Independent	Bhupinder Johar	3,175	4.48
Independent	Leah Pillet	2,627	3.71
Independent	Sarah Little	2,546	3.59
Independent	Rebecca Stiles	2,458	3.47
Independent	Rajinder Chhina	2,312	3.26
Independent	Chris O'Brian	2,225	3.14
Independent	Andre Roberge	2,040	2.88
Independent	Lou Jose	1,591	2.24
Independent	Grover Telford	1,299	1.83
Independent	Jeffrey Martin	1,297	1.83
Independent	Jeff Roberts	845	1.19

== Merritt ==
The results in Merritt were as follows:

=== Mayoral election ===
Mayoral candidate	Vote	%
**Michael G. Goetz** †	**859**	**35.9**
Tony Luck	700	29.3
Linda A. Brown (X)	565	23.6
Mike Bhangu	267	11.2

== Metchosin ==
The results in Metchosin were as follows:

=== Mayoral election ===
Mayoral candidate	Vote	%
**Marie-Térèse Little** †	**1,015**	**51.7**
Kyara Kahakauwila	933	47.5

== Metro Vancouver Electoral Area A ==
The results in Metro Vancouver Electoral Area A were as follows:

=== Director election ===
Party	Director candidate	Votes	%
Independent	Jen McCutcheon (X)	815	
Progress Vancouver	Jonah T. Gonzales	184	

== Mission ==
=== Mayoral election ===
The results for mayor of Mission were as follows:

Mayoral candidate	Vote	%
**Paul Horn** (X) †	**4,419**	**67.07**
H.S. Kenny Braich	1,758	26.68
Dustin Hiles	412	6.25

=== Mission City Council election ===
The results for Mission City Council were as follows:

Top 6 candidates elected

Council candidate	Vote	%
**Jag Gill** (X) †	**4,945**	**15.53**
**Ken Herar** (X) †	**2,959**	**9.29**
**Carol Hamilton** (X) †	**2,899**	**9.11**
**Mark Davies** (X) †	**2,889**	**9.07**
**Danny Plecas** (X) †	**2,839**	**8.92**
**Angel Elias** †	**2,762**	**8.68**
Candace Koch	2,408	7.56
Brandon Kealey	1,964	6.17
Arsh Dhaliwal	1,573	4.94
Tyler McStravick	1,400	4.40
Steve McLay	1,314	4.13
Pash Brar	1,042	3.27
Paul Hockridge	1,019	3.20
Earl Babich	876	2.75
Sabastien Obi	534	1.68
Shailu Handa	415	1.30

== Nanaimo ==
=== Mayoral election ===
The results for mayor of Nanaimo were as follows:

Mayoral candidate	Vote	%
**Leonard Krog** (X) †	**12,390**	**68.41**
Tasha Brown	4,207	23.23
Agnes Provost	792	4.37
Brunie Brunie	723	3.99

=== Nanaimo City Council election ===
The results for Nanaimo City Council were as follows:

Top 8 candidates elected

Council candidate	Vote	%
**Paul Manly**	**10,366**	**8.36**
**Sheryl Armstrong** (X) †	**10,260**	**8.27**
**Ben Geselbracht** (X) †	**8,383**	**6.76**
**Ian Thorpe** (X) †	**8,040**	**6.48**
**Erin Hemmens** (X) †	**7,497**	**6.04**
**Janice Perrino** †	**7,131**	**5.75**
**Tyler Brown** (X) †	**6,805**	**5.49**
**Hilary Eastmure** †	**5,650**	**4.55**
Don Bonner (X)	5,524	4.45
Norm Smith	5,254	4.24
Nick Greer	5,050	4.07
Zeni Maartman (X)	4,759	3.84
Peter Lee	4,022	3.24
Gary Korpan	3,769	3.04
Michael Ribicic	3,357	2.71
Alan MacDonald	3,336	2.69
Paul Chapman	3,298	2.66
Viraat B. Thammanna	3,100	2.50
Mike Hartlaub	2,731	2.20
Shirley Lambrecht	2,540	2.05
Frank Pluta	2,384	1.92
Derek Hanna	2,295	1.85
David Wang	2,004	1.62
Ken Bennett	1,847	1.49
Jeff Annesley	1,586	1.28
Peter Poole	934	0.75
Corey Trinkwon	757	0.61
Robb Squire	734	0.59
Jay Krishan	627	0.51

== Nanaimo A (South Wellington, Cassidy, Cedar) Electoral Area ==
The results in the Regional District of Nanaimo Electoral Area A (South Wellington, Cassidy, Cedar) were as follows:

=== Director election ===
Director candidate	Vote	%
**Jessica Stanley** †	**359**	**40.3**
Kate Poirier	319	35.8
Keith Wilson (X)	123	13.8
Carl Delcourt	89	10.0

== Nanaimo Regional District E (Nanoose) Electoral Area ==
The results in the Regional District of Nanaimo Electoral Area E (Nanoose) were as follows:

=== Director election ===
Director candidate	Vote	%
**Bob Rogers** (X) †	Acclaimed	

== Nanaimo F (Coombs, Hilliers, Errington) Electoral Area ==
The results in the Regional District of Nanaimo Electoral Area F (Coombs, Hilliers, Errington) were as follows:

=== Director election ===
Director candidate	Vote	%
**Leanne Salter** (X) †	**578**	**55.8**
Kevin Goldfuss	458	44.2

== Nanaimo G (Dashwood, Englishman River, French Creek) Electoral Area ==
The results in the Regional District of Nanaimo Electoral Area G (Dashwood, Englishman River, French Creek) were as follows:

=== Director election ===
Director candidate	Vote	%
**Lehann Wallace** (X) †	**986**	75.4
Doug Kitts	322	24.6

== Nelson ==
The results in Nelson were as follows:

=== Mayoral election ===
Mayoral candidate	Vote	%
**Janice Morrison** †	**1,562**	**45.01**
John A. Dooley (X)	915	26.37
John N. Buffery	897	25.85
Tom Prior	67	1.93
Mike Zeabin	29	0.84

== New Westminster ==
2022 New Westminster municipal election
- 15 October 2022

1 mayor, 6 city councillors, and 7 school board trustees
- Turnout: 15,923
- Mayoral election
	First party	Second party	Third party
Candidate	Patrick Johnstone	Ken Armstrong	Chuck Puchmayr
Party	Community First	Progressives	Independent
Leader's seat	Councillor	N/A	Councillor
Popular vote	6,676	5,227	3,912
Percentage	42.21	33.05	26.74
Mayor before election
Jonathan X. Côte
Independent
Elected mayor
Patrick Johnstone
Community First
- City council election
Party	Seats	+/–
Community First New West	4	+4
New West Progressives	2	+2
This lists parties that won seats. See the complete results below.
Council before	Council after
Non-partisan	Community First majority
- School board election
Party	Seats	+/–
Community First New West	6	+6
New West Progressives	1	0
This lists parties that won seats. See the complete results below.

=== Mayoral election ===
The results for mayor of New Westminster were as follows:

2022 New Westminster municipal election: Mayor
Party	Candidate	Votes	%	Elected
Community First New West	Patrick Johnstone	6,676	41.93	check
New West Progressives	Ken Armstrong	5,227	33.05	
Independent	Chuck Puchmayr	3,912	26.74	
Total valid votes		15,815	99.32	
Total rejected ballots		108	0.68	
Turnout		15,923	37.52	
Source: CivicInfoBC

=== New Westminster City Council election ===
The results for New Westminster City Council were as follows:

Top 6 candidates elected

Party	Council candidate	Vote	%
**Community First New West**	**Ruby Campbell** †	**8,354**	**10.30**
**Community First New West**	**Jaimie McEvoy** (X) †	**7,927**	**9.77**
**Community First New West**	**Tasha Henderson** †	**7,704**	**9.49**
**Community First New West**	**Nadine Nakagawa** (X) †	**7,663**	**9.44**
**New West Progressives**	**Paul Minhas** †	**7,252**	**8.94**
**New West Progressives**	**Daniel Fontaine** †	**7,189**	**8.86**
Community First New West	Chinu Das (X)	7,027	8.66
New West Progressives	Rick Folka	6,283	7.74
New West Progressives	Karima Budhwani	6,204	7.65
New West Progressives	Jiayi Li-McCarthy	6,012	7.41
Community First New West	Bereket Kebede	5,786	7.13
Independent	Daniel Ampong	3,743	4.61

== North Cowichan ==
The results in North Cowichan were as follows:

=== Mayoral election ===
Mayoral candidate	Vote	%
**Rob Douglas** †	**3,503**	**41.48**
John Koury	2,747	32.53
Rosalie Sawrie	2,195	25.99

== North Saanich ==
The results in North Saanich were as follows:

=== Mayoral election ===
Mayoral candidate	Vote	%
**Peter Jones** †	**2,226**	**58.7**
Nancy E. Borden	828	21.9
Murray Weisenberger	698	18.4

== North Vancouver City ==
=== Mayoral election ===
The results for mayor of the City of North Vancouver were as follows:

Mayoral candidate	Vote	%
**Linda Buchanan** (X) †	**5,275**	**57.35**
Guy Heywood	3,923	42.65

=== North Vancouver City Council election ===
The results for North Vancouver City Council were as follows:

Top 6 candidates elected

Council candidate	Vote	%
**Tony Valente** (X) †	**5,272**	**11.72**
**Don Bell** (X)	**5,221**	**11.60**
**Angela Girard** (X) †	**5,140**	**11.42**
**Shervin Shahriari** †	**4,596**	**10.22**
**Jessica McIlroy** (X) †	**3,913**	**8.70**
**Holly Back** (X) †	**3,892**	**8.65**
Kathy McGrenera	3,726	8.28
Jeremy Cato	3,434	7.63
Anna Boltenko	3,256	7.24
Me-An Laceste	2,526	5.61
Ron Polly	2,071	4.60
Max Lai	1,943	4.32

== North Vancouver District ==
=== Mayoral election ===
The results for mayor of North Vancouver District were as follows:

Mayoral candidate	Vote	%
**Mike Little** (X) †	**7,582**	**51.08**
Matthew Bond	7,260	48.92

=== North Vancouver District Council election ===
The results for North Vancouver District Council were as follows:

Top 6 candidates elected

Council candidate	Vote	%
**Jordan Back** (X) †	**9,052**	**12.59**
**Lisa Muri** (X) †	**7,903**	**10.99**
**Jim Hanson** (X) †	**7,499**	**10.43**
**Catherine Pope** †	**7,104**	**9.88**
**Herman Mah** †	**6,379**	**8.87**
**Betty Forbes** (X) †	**5,640**	**7.85**
Trey Bell	5,243	7.29
Ellison Mallin	5,217	7.26
Greg Robins	5,128	7.13
Peter Teevan	4,910	6.83
Harrison Johnston	4,006	5.57
Clayton Welwood	2,471	3.44
Thomas Tofigh	1,339	1.86

== Oak Bay ==
The results in Oak Bay were as follows:

=== Mayoral election ===
Mayoral candidate	Vote	%
**Kevin Murdoch** (X) †	Acclaimed	

== Okanagan-Similkameen A ==
The results Regional District of Okanagan-Similkameen Electoral Area A (Osoyoos Rural) were as follows:

=== Director election ===
Director candidate	Vote	%
**Mark Pendergraft** (X) †	Acclaimed	

== Okanagan-Similkameen B ==
The results Regional District of Okanagan-Similkameen Electoral Area B (Cawston) were as follows:

=== Director election ===
Director candidate	Vote	%
**George Dickson Bush** (X) †	**221**	**85.99**
Joe Domijan	36	14.01

== Okanagan-Similkameen C ==
The results Regional District of Okanagan-Similkameen Electoral Area C (Oliver Rural) were as follows:

=== Director election ===
Director candidate	Vote	%
**Ricklend Kirk Louie Knodel** (X) †	Acclaimed	

== Okanagan-Similkameen D ==
The results Regional District of Okanagan-Similkameen Electoral Area D (Okanagan Falls Rural) were as follows:

=== Director election ===
Director candidate	Vote	%
**Matthew Taylor** †	**716**	**64.68**
Ron Obirek (X)	391	35.32

== Okanagan-Similkameen E ==
The results Regional District of Okanagan-Similkameen Electoral Area E (Naramata Rural) were as follows:

=== Director election ===
Director candidate	Vote	%
**Adrienne Fedrigo** †	**326**	**53.53**
Anito Molaro	238	39.08
Jason Cox	45	7.39

== Okanagan-Similkameen F ==
The results Regional District of Okanagan-Similkameen Electoral Area F (Summerland Rural) were as follows:

=== Director election ===
Director candidate	Vote	%
**Riley M. Gettens** (X) †	Acclaimed	

== Okanagan-Similkameen G ==
The results Regional District of Okanagan-Similkameen Electoral Area G (Keremeos Rural) were as follows:

=== Director election ===
Director candidate	Vote	%
**Tim Roberts** (X) †	Acclaimed	

== Okanagan-Similkameen H ==
The results Regional District of Okanagan-Similkameen Electoral Area H (Princeton Rural) were as follows:

=== Director election ===
Director candidate	Vote	%
**Robert Brian Coyne** (X) †	**306**	**60.24**
Michael Mazurek	202	39.76

== Okanagan-Similkameen I ==
The results Regional District of Okanagan-Similkameen Electoral Area I (Kaleden Rural) were as follows:

=== Director election ===
Director candidate	Vote	%
**Subrina Anne Monteith** (X) †	**303**	**75.75**
Mike Jason Campol	97	24.25

== Oliver ==
The results in Oliver were as follows:

=== Mayoral election ===
Mayoral candidate	Vote	%
**Martin Johansen** (X) †	Acclaimed	

== Osoyoos ==
The results in Osoyoos were as follows:

=== Mayoral election ===
Mayoral candidate	Vote	%
**Sue H. McKortoff** (X) †	**1,109**	**52.8**
Dustin Sikora	972	46.3

== Parksville ==
The results in Parksville were as follows:

=== Mayoral election ===
Mayoral candidate	Vote	%
**Doug O'Brien** †	**2,695**	**67.2**
Ed Mayne (X)	1,225	30.6

== Peace River B Electoral Area ==
The results in the Peace River Regional District Electoral Area B were as follows:

=== Director election ===
Director candidate	Vote	%
Michael B. Fitzgerald		
Jordan Kealy		
Jeff A. Kitt		

== Peace River C Electoral Area ==
The results in the Peace River Regional District Electoral Area C were as follows:

=== Director election ===
Director candidate	Vote	%
Brad P. Sperling (X)		
Suzanne D. Haab		

== Peachland ==
The results in Peachland were as follows:

=== Mayoral election ===
Mayoral candidate	Vote	%
**Patrick Van Minsel** †	**1,104**	**46.0**
Keith Fielding	983	41.0
Cindy Fortin (X)	293	12.2

== Penticton ==
The results in Penticton were as follows:

=== Mayoral election ===
Mayoral candidate	Vote	%
**Julius Bloomfield** †	**3,374**	**34.08**
Jason Reynen	3,155	31.87
John Vassilaki (X)	2,052	20.73
Owen Hayward	826	8.34
Corey Hounslow	492	4.97

=== Penticton City Council election ===
The results for Penticton City Council were as follows:

Top 6 candidates elected

Council candidate	Vote	%
**Amelia Boultbee** †	**5,618**	**55.54**
**James Miller** (X) †	**4,488**	**44.37**
**Ryan Graham** †	**4,366**	**43.16**
**Helena Konanz** †	**3,730**	**36.88**
**Campbell Watt** (X) †	**3,653**	**36.11**
**Isaac Gilbert** †	**3,309**	**32.71**
Andrew Jakubeit	3,289	32.52
Frank Regehr (X)	3,020	29.86
Katie O&#39;Kell	2,928	28.95
Nick Kruger	2,921	28.88
Shannon Stewart	2,734	27.03
Wayne Llewellyn	2,452	24.24
Katie Robinson (X)	2,350	23.23
Lindsey Hall	2,013	19.90
Larry Schwartzenberger	1,699	16.80
Davinder Sandhu	1,390	13.74
**Turnout**	10,115	33.40

== Pitt Meadows ==
The results in Pitt Meadows were as follows:

=== Mayoral election ===
Mayoral candidate	Votes	%
**Nicole MacDonald** †	Acclaimed	

=== Pitt Meadows City Council election ===
Top 6 candidates elected

Council candidate	Vote	%
Tracy Elke (X)		
Mike Hayes (X)		
Bob Meachen (X)		
Gwen O’Connell (X)		
Bryce Casidy		
Janis Elkerton		
Alison Evans		
Don Jolley		
Mike Manion		
Jag Parmar		
Brad Perrie		

== Port Alberni ==
=== Mayoral election ===
Mayoral candidate	Vote	%
**Sharie Minions** (X) †	**2,524**	**50.6**
Tom W. Verbrugge	2,358	47.3

== Port Coquitlam ==
=== Mayoral election ===
The results for mayor of Port Coquitlam were as follows:

Mayoral candidate	Votes	%
**Brad West** (X) †	Acclaimed	

=== Port Coquitlam City Council election ===
The results for Port Coquitlam City Council were as follows:

Top 6 candidates elected

Council candidate	Vote	%
**Nancy McCurrach** (X) †	**5,234**	**12.32**
**Glenn Pollock** (X) †	**4,994**	**11.76**
**Darrell Penner** (X) †	**4,660**	**10.97**
**Steve Darling** (X) †	**4,607**	**10.85**
**Dean Washington** (X) †	**4,053**	**9.54**
**Paige Petriw** †	**2,393**	**5.63**
Dawn Becker	2,334	5.50
Cindy Carkner	2,203	5.19
Darin Nielsen	2,186	5.15
Erik Minty	1,726	4.06
Sarah Harbord	1,721	4.05
Justin Smith	1,339	3.15
Jenny X. Zhou	1,122	2.64
Ivanka Culjak	964	2.27
Mithila Karnik	833	1.96
Derek Jeffrey	818	1.93
Jami Watson	800	1.88
Kevin Misera	484	1.14

== Port Moody ==
The results in Port Moody were as follows:

=== Mayoral election ===
Mayoral candidate	Vote	%
**Meghan Lahti** †	**4,940**	**55.55**
Steve Milani	3,953	44.45

== Powell River ==
The results in Powell River were as follows:

=== Mayoral election ===
Mayoral candidate	Vote	%
**Ron Woznow** †	**2,981**	**56.8**
Carole Ann Leishman	1,283	24.4
Maggie Hathaway	945	18.0

== Prince George ==
=== Mayoral election ===
The results for mayor of Prince George were as follows:

Mayoral candidate	Vote	%
**Simon Yu**	**6,092**	**40.20**
Terri McConnachie	4,152	27.40
Roy Stewart	2,424	16.00
Adam Hyatt	1,773	11.70
Lisa Mitchell	553	3.65
Christopher S. Wood	159	1.05

=== Prince George City Council election ===
The results for Prince George City Council were as follows:

Top 8 candidates elected

Council candidate	Vote	%
**Brian Skakun** (X) †	**9,370**	**10.60**
**Garth Frizzell** (X) †	**6,911**	**7.81**
**Kyle Sampson** (X) †	**6,840**	**7.73**
**Cori Ramsay** (X) †	**5,971**	**6.75**
**Ron Polillo** †	**5,865**	**6.43**
**Trudy Klassen** †	**5,515**	**6.24**
**Tim Bennett** †	**5,295**	**5.99**
**Susan Scott** (X) †	**5,224**	**5.91**
Wesley Mitchell	4,790	5.42
Cameron Stolz	4,401	4.98
Karm Manhas	4,333	4.90
Karen Muir	3,973	4.49
James Steidle	3,947	4.46
John Zukowski	3,440	3.89
Colleen Mahoney	3,399	3.84
Chris Stern	2,425	2.74
Paul Serup	2,081	2.35
Doug Jeffery	1,903	2.15
Nour Salim	1,729	1.96
Richard Cook	1,202	1.36

== Prince Rupert ==
The results in Prince Rupert were as follows:

=== Mayoral election ===
Mayoral candidate	Vote	%
**Herb Pond** †	**1,486**	**51.5**
Chrystopher Thompson	885	30.6
Jason Hoang	396	13.7
Stephen Fitzpatrick	69	2.4

== Qualicum Beach ==
The results in Qualicum Beach were as follows:

=== Mayoral election ===
Mayoral candidate	Vote	%
**Teunis Westbroek** †	**2,819**	**63.3**
Brian S. Wiese (X)	1,565	35.1

== Quesnel ==
The results in Quesnel were as follows:

=== Mayoral election ===
Mayoral candidate	Vote	%
**Ron Paull** †	**1,184**	**51.1**
Bob Simpson (X)	975	42.1
David W. Schile	86	3.7
Brian D. Waters	50	2.2

== Revelstoke ==
The results in Revelstoke were as follows:

=== Mayoral election ===
Mayoral candidate	Vote	%
**Gary Sulz** (X) †	**1,461**	**77.18**
Nicole Cherlet	432	22.82

== Richmond ==
2022 Richmond municipal election

8 seats on Richmond City Council + 1 mayor (5 seats needed for majority)
- Mayoral election
	First party	Second party	Third party
Candidate	Malcolm Brodie	John Roston	Wei Ping Chen
Party	Independent	RITE Richmond	Independent
Leader's seat	Mayor	N/A	N/A
Popular vote	23,239	9,304	1,859
Percentage	67.55	27.04	5.40
Mayor before election
Malcolm Brodie
Independent
Elected mayor
Malcolm Brodie
Independent
- City council election
Party	Seats	+/–
RITE Richmond	3	+1
ONE Richmond	2	+2
Richmond Community Coalition	1	0
Richmond United	1	+1
Richmond RISE	1	+1
This lists parties that won seats. See the complete results below.

=== Mayoral election ===
The results for mayor of Richmond were as follows:

Party	Mayoral candidate	Votes	%
**Independent**	**Malcolm Brodie** (X) †	**23,239**	**67.55**
RITE Richmond	John Roston	9,304	27.04
Independent	Wei Ping Chen	1,859	5.40

=== Richmond City Council election ===
The results for Richmond City Council were as follows:

Top 8 candidates elected

Party	Council candidate	Votes	%
**Richmond Community Coalition**	**Chak Au** (X) †	**16,515**	**7.64**
**RITE Richmond**	**Carol Day** (X) †	**15,737**	**7.28**
**ONE Richmond**	**Bill McNulty** (X) †	**15,133**	**7.00**
**ONE Richmond**	**Alexa Loo** (X) †	**13,485**	**6.24**
**RITE Richmond**	**Michael Wolfe** (X) †	**12,953**	**5.99**
**Richmond United**	**Andy Hobbs** (X) †	**12,760**	**5.90**
**RITE Richmond**	**Laura Gillanders** †	**10,817**	**5.00**
**Richmond RISE**	**Kash Heed**	**10,563**	**4.89**
Richmond RISE	Derek Dang	10,306	4.77
Independent	Evan Dunfee	10,177	4.68
RITE Richmond	Jerome Dicky	8,797	4.07
Richmond Citizens	Jack Trovato	7,831	3.62
Richmond United	Eric Yung	7,016	3.25
Independent	Elsa Wong	6,789	3.14
Richmond Citizens	Mark Lee	6,025	2.79
Richmond Citizens	Keefer Pelech	5,993	2.77
Richmond United	Melissa Zhang	5,936	2.75
Richmond Community Coalition	Sheldon Starrett	5,573	2.58
Richmond Community Coalition	Rahim Othman	4,936	2.28
Independent	Sunny Ho	4,654	2.15
Richmond Citizens	Fipe Wong	4,617	2.14
Independent	Jasmin Piao	4,500	2.08
Independent	Adil Awan	4,197	1.94
Independent	Bill Han	3,292	1.52
Independent	Chai Chung	3,125	1.45
Independent	Dennis Page	3,005	1.39
Independent	Mohamud Ali Farah	1,526	0.71

== Saanich ==
=== Mayoral election ===
The results for mayor of Saanich were as follows:

Mayoral candidate	Votes	%
**Dean Murdock**	**13,631**	**50.28**
Fred Haynes (X)	13,479	49.72

=== Saanich District Council election ===
The results for Saanich District Council were as follows:

Top 8 candidates elected

Council candidate	Vote	%
**Colin Plant** (X) †	**16,324**	**9.00**
**Susan Brice** (X) †	**15,355**	**8.47**
**Zac de Vries** (X) †	**14,274**	**7.87**
**Judith Brownoff** (X) †	**11,845**	**6.53**
**Mena Westhaver** †	**11,459**	**6.32**
**Nathalie Chambers** (X) †	**10,633**	**5.87**
**Karen Harper** (X) †	**10,436**	**5.76**
**Teale Phelps Bondaroff** †	**9,218**	**5.08**
Rishi Sharma	9,207	5.08
Basil Langevin	8,418	4.64
Trevor Barry	7,332	4.04
Jordan MacDougall	6,838	3.77
Mark Neufeld	6,710	3.70
Kathleen Burton	6,688	3.69
Jordan Reichert	6,400	3.53
Gregory Matte	6,160	3.40
Mark Leiren-Young	5,091	2.81
Sasha Izard	4,959	2.74
Bianca Chu	4,494	2.48
Vernon Lord	3,822	2.11
Art Pollard	3,329	1.84
Leslie Miller-Brooks	2,288	1.26

== Salmon Arm ==
The results in Salmon Arm were as follows:

=== Mayoral election ===
Mayoral candidate	Vote	%
**Alan R. Harrison** (X) †	**3,213**	**69.1**
Luke Norrie	747	16.1
Nancy Cooper	675	14.5

== Salt Spring Island Electoral Area ==
The results in Capital Regional District Electoral Area F (Salt Spring Island) were as follows:

=== Director election ===
Director candidate	Vote	%
**Gary Holman** (X) †	**1917**	**48.95**
Jesse Brown	971	24.8
Kylie Coates	941	24.03

== Sechelt ==
The results in Sechelt were as follows:

=== Mayoral election ===
Mayoral candidate	Vote	%
**John Henderson** †	**1,399**	**35.5**
Darnelda Siegers (X)	1,012	25.7
Allan Holt	678	17.2
Jeri Patterson	346	8.8

=== Sechelt Council election ===
The results for Sechelt Council were as follows:

Top 6 candidates elected

Council candidate	Vote	%
**Alton Toth** (X) †	**2,100**	**53.27**
**Brenda Rowe** (X) †	**1,775**	**45.08**
**Donna Bell** †	**1,558**	**39.52**
**Darren Inkster** †	**1,518**	**38.56**
**Adam Shepherd** †	**1,494**	**38.00**
**Dianne Mclauchlan** †	**1,370**	**34.75**
Cheryl Chang	1,297	32.95
Warren Allan	1,275	32.34
Christopher Moore	1,246	31.71
Thomas Bramble	1,191	30.31
Tim Horner	990	25.16
Micky Argiropoulos	932	23.69
Anna Jade Chen	573	14.54
Turnout	3,942	41.05

== Sidney ==
The results in Sidney were as follows:

=== Mayoral election ===
Mayoral candidate	Vote	%
**Cliff McNeil-Smith** (X) †	Acclaimed	

== Smithers ==
The results in Smithers were as follows:

=== Mayoral election ===
Mayoral candidate	Vote	%
**Gladys Atrill** (X) †	**983**	**53.5**
Murray Hawse	772	42.0

== Sooke ==
The results in Sooke were as follows:

=== Mayoral election ===
Mayoral candidate	Vote	%
**Maja Tait** (X) †	**2,403**	**71.6**
Mick Rhodes	578	17.2
John Knops	246	7.3

== Southern Gulf Islands Electoral Area ==
The results in Capital Regional District Electoral Area G (Southern Gulf Islands) were as follows:

=== Director election ===
Director candidate	Vote	%
**Paul Brent** †	**1643**	**53.8**
Ben McConchie	1289	42.21

== Spallumcheen ==
The results in Spallumcheen were as follows:

=== Mayoral election ===
Mayoral candidate	Vote	%
**Christine Fraser** (X) †	Acclaimed	

== Squamish ==
The results in Squamish were as follows:

=== Mayoral election ===
Party	Mayoral candidate	Vote	%
**Independent**	**Armand V. Hurford** †	**4,436**	**66.57**
Squamish First	Mike Young	1,184	17.77
Independent	Deanna Lewis-Kalkalilh	1,044	15.67

== Summerland ==
The results in Summerland were as follows:

=== Mayoral election ===
Mayoral candidate	Vote	%
**Doug Holmes** †	**2,634**	**73.4**
Chuck Pinnell	859	23.9

== Surrey ==
=== Mayoral election ===
2022 Surrey municipal election

8 seats on Surrey City Council + 1 mayor (5 seats needed for majority)
- Mayoral election
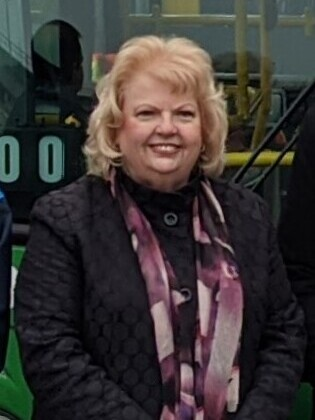

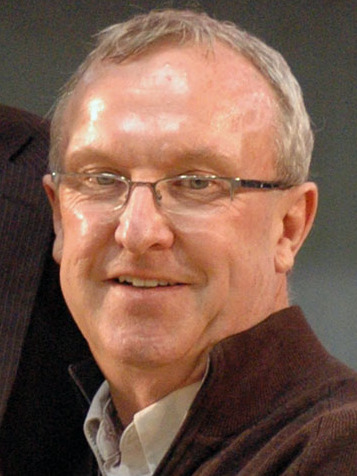

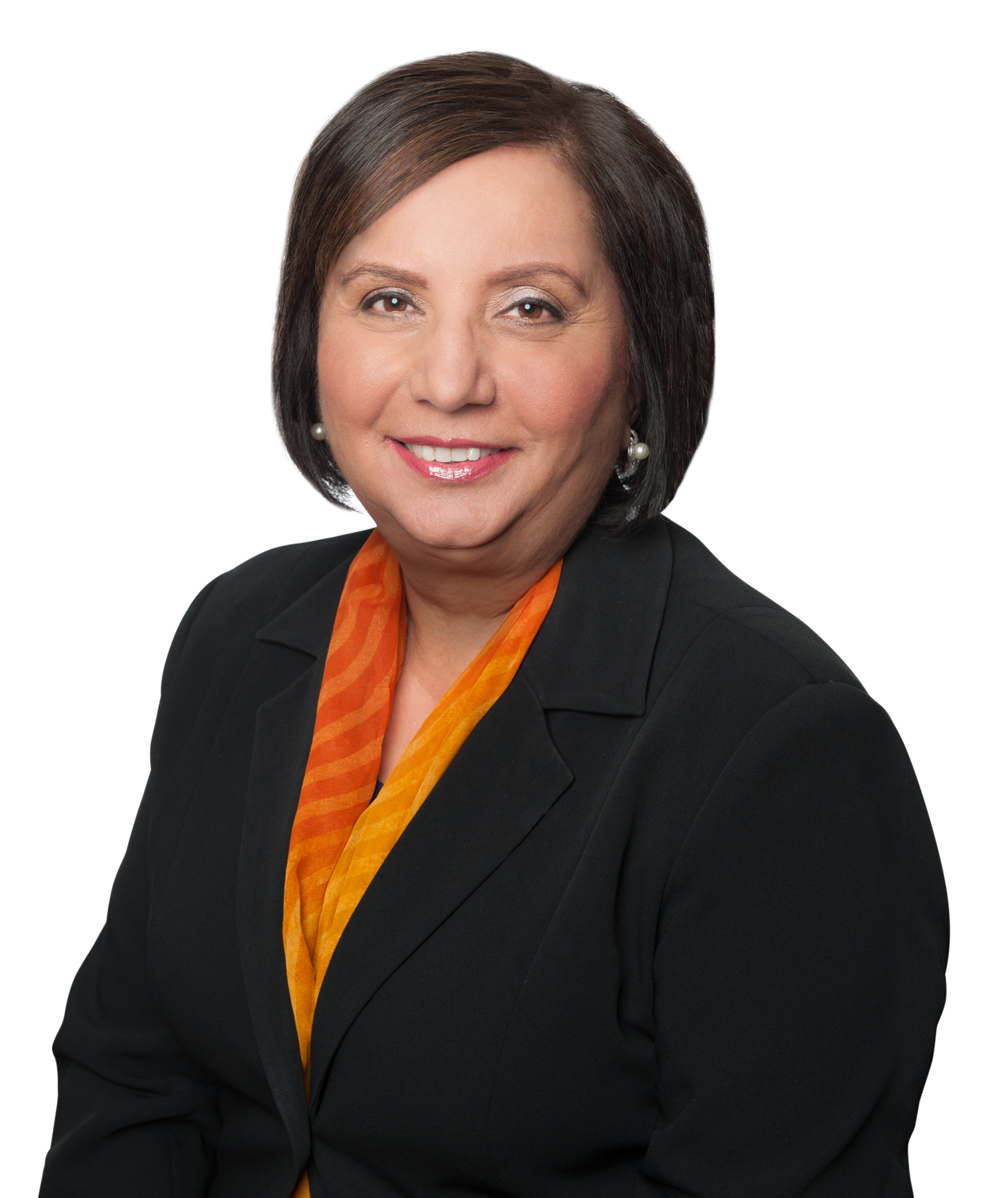

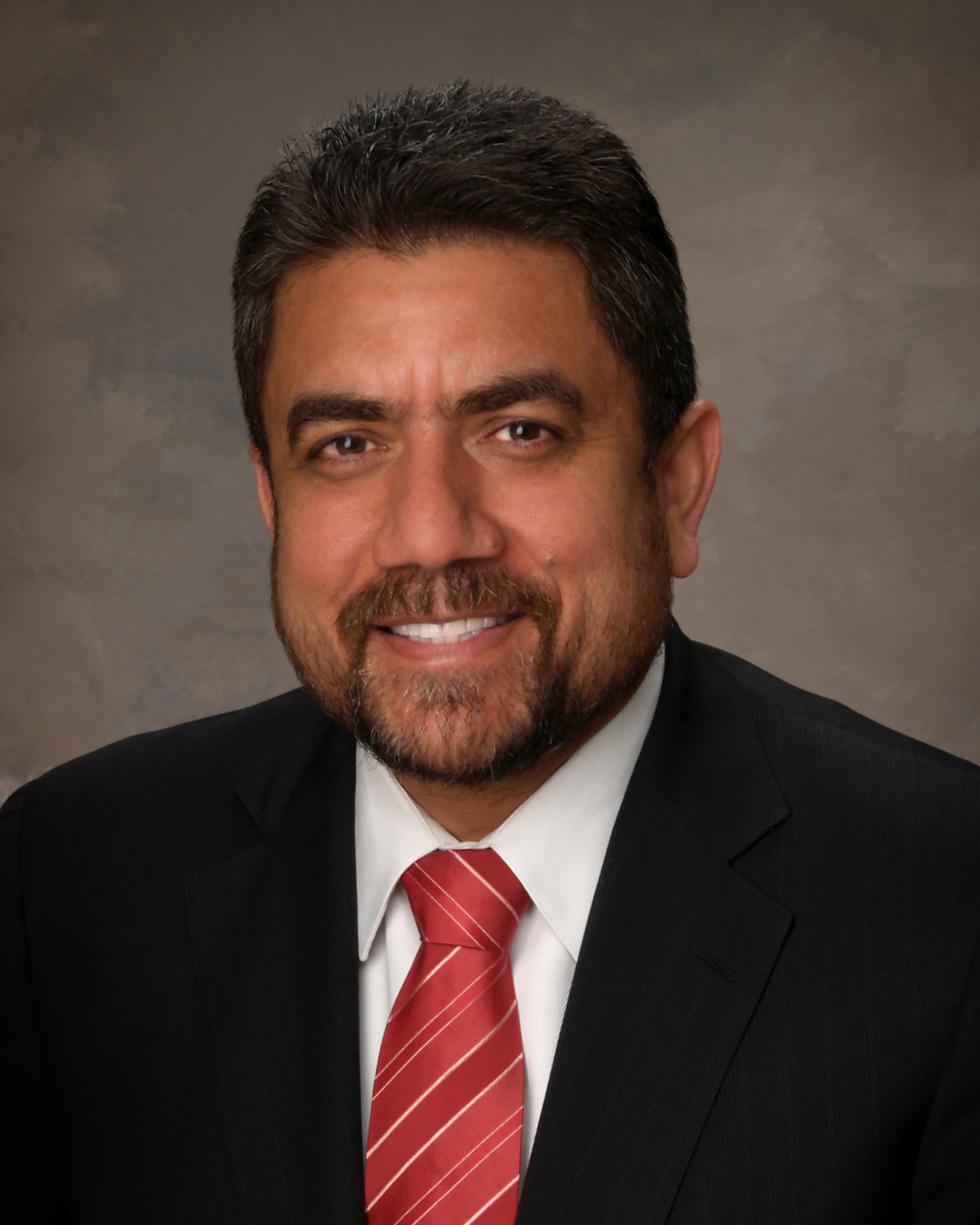
	First party	Second party	Third party
		SSC
Candidate	Brenda Locke	Doug McCallum	Gordie Hogg
Party	Surrey Connect	Safe Surrey Coalition	Surrey First
Leader since	2021	2014
Leader's seat	Councillor	Mayor	N/A
Popular vote	33,411	32,338	24,916
Percentage	28.14%	27.31	21.05
	Fourth party	Fifth party
Candidate	Jinny Sims	Sukh Dhaliwal
Party	Surrey Forward	United Surrey
Leader's seat	N/A	N/A
Popular vote	14,895	9,629
Percentage	12.58	8.13
Mayor before election
Doug McCallum
Safe Surrey Coalition
Elected mayor
Brenda Locke
Surrey Connect
- City council election
Party	Seats	+/–
Surrey Connect	4	+4
Safe Surrey Coalition	2	−5
Surrey First	2	+1
This lists parties that won seats. See the complete results below.

The results for mayor of Surrey were as follows:

Party	Mayoral candidate	Vote	%
**Surrey Connect**	**Brenda Locke** †	**33,311**	**28.14**
Safe Surrey Coalition	Doug McCallum (X)	32,338	27.31
Surrey First	Gordie Hogg	24,916	21.05
Surrey Forward	Jinny Sims	14,895	12.58
United Surrey	Sukh Dhaliwal	9,629	8.13
People's Council Surrey	Amrit Birring	2,270	1.92
Independent	John Wolanski	646	0.55
Independent	Kuldip Pelia	385	0.33

==== Opinion polls ====
Polling firm	Link	Date(s) administered	Sample Size	Margin of error	Dhaliwal	Hogg	Locke	McCallum	Sims	Undecided
Mainstreet	PDF	6–7 Oct 2022	882	±3.3%	6	13	**24**	19	12	25
Leger	PDF	1–5 Oct 2022	554	±4.1%	11	11	**25**	7	8	36
Mainstreet	PDF	26–27 Jul 2022	668	±3.8%	9	14	**22**	13	8	33

=== Surrey City Council election ===
The results for Surrey City Council were as follows:

Top 8 candidates elected

Party	Council candidate	Vote	%
**Surrey First**	**Linda Annis** (X) †	**35,222**	**4.32**
**Surrey Connect**	**Harry Bains** †	**33,708**	**4.13**
**Surrey First**	**Mike Bose** †	**30,763**	**3.77**
**Surrey Connect**	**Gordon Hepner** †	**27,586**	**3.38**
**Surrey Connect**	**Rob Stutt** †	**25,699**	**3.15**
**Surrey Connect**	**Pardeep Kooner** †	**25,118**	**3.08**
**Safe Surrey Coalition**	**Doug Elford** (X) †	**24,658**	**3.02**
**Safe Surrey Coalition**	**Mandeep Nagra** (X) †	**24,406**	**2.99**
Surrey Connect	Ramona Kaptyn	23,249	2.85
Surrey Connect	Rochelle Prasad	23,106	2.83
Surrey Connect	Wil Kwok	23,090	2.83
Surrey First	May-Em Waddington	22,924	2.81
Safe Surrey Coalition	Allison Patton (X)	22,629	2.77
Safe Surrey Coalition	John Gibeau	22,105	2.71
Safe Surrey Coalition	Stuart Drysdale	22,096	2.71
Surrey First	Bilal Cheema	21,966	2.69
Safe Surrey Coalition	Laurie Guerra (X)	21,695	2.66
Safe Surrey Coalition	Debra Antifaev	19,945	2.44
Surrey Connect	Sebastian Sajda	19,910	2.44
Safe Surrey Coalition	Raman Jassar	19,619	2.40
Surrey First	Paul Orazietti	18,372	2.25
Surrey First	Sargy Chima	18,317	2.25
Surrey First	Ajit Mehat	17,939	2.20
Surrey First	Kulwinder Saini	17,728	2.17
Surrey Forward	Philip Aguirre	17,491	2.14
Surrey Forward	June Liu	15,761	1.93
Surrey Forward	Paramjit Malhi	14,395	1.76
Surrey Forward	Ramon Bandong	14,315	1.75
Surrey Forward	Theresa Pidcock	14,285	1.75
Surrey Forward	Jody Toor	14,115	1.73
United Surrey	Nicole Bennett	11,702	1.43
Surrey Forward	Arsh Mander	11,058	1.36
United Surrey	Andy Dhillon	10,461	1.28
United Surrey	Becky Zhou	9,563	1.17
United Surrey	Jasbir Sandhu	9,264	1.14
United Surrey	Jeff Bridge	9,197	1.13
Independent	Steven Pettigrew (X)	8,712	1.07
United Surrey	Julie Tapley	8,692	1.07
United Surrey	Margarett Lange	8,536	1.05
Independent	Narima Dela Cruz	8,326	1.02
People's Council Surrey	Joe Kennedy	7,986	0.98
Independent	Rina Gill	7,219	0.88
United Surrey	Zubeen Sahib	6,635	0.81
People's Council Surrey	Tejnoor Cheema	5,701	0.70
People's Council Surrey	Kiran K. Hundal	5,380	0.66
Independent	Ming Zheng	4,454	0.55
People's Council Surrey	Shweta Bassi	4,218	0.52
Independent	Kam Pawar	3,903	0.48
People's Council Surrey	Kultar Singh	3,828	0.47
Independent	Preet Sandhu	3,497	0.43
Independent	Ben Arcand	3,494	0.43
Independent	Manjeet Sahota	3,436	0.42
Independent	Kristofor Kinney	2,242	0.27
Independent	Nav Dhanoya	2,235	0.27
Independent	Sam Kofalt	2,125	0.26
Independent	Bosco Misquitta	1,753	0.21

== Terrace ==
The results in Terrace were as follows:

=== Mayoral election ===
Mayoral candidate	Vote	%
**Sean Bujtas** †	Acclaimed	

== Trail ==
The results in Trail were as follows:

=== Mayoral election ===
Mayoral candidate	Vote	%
**Colleen Jones** †	**1,310**	**53.9**
Lisa Pasin (X)	1,078	44.4

== Vernon ==
=== Mayoral election ===
The results for mayor of Vernon were as follows:

Mayoral candidate	Vote	%
**Victor Cumming** (X) †	**4,346**	**50.84**
Scott Anderson	3,673	42.96
Erik Olesen	530	6.20

=== Vernon City Council election ===
The results for Vernon City Council were as follows:

Top 6 candidates elected

Council candidate	Vote	%
**Kelly Fehr** (X) †	**4,538**	**11.50**
**Kari Gares** (X) †	**4,485**	**11.36**
**Teresa Durning** (X) †	**4,309**	**10.92**
**Akbal Mund** (X) †	**4,131**	**10.47**
**Brian Guy** †	**4,092**	**10.37**
**Brian Quiring** (X) †	**3,945**	**9.99**
Jenelle Brewer	3,659	9.27
Dawn Tucker	3,456	8.76
Ed Stranks	1,860	4.71
Stephanie Hendy	1,578	4.00
Ross Hawse	1,484	3.76
Patrick C. Vance	1,256	3.18
Andy Wylie	677	1.72

== Victoria ==
=== Mayoral election ===
The results for mayor of Victoria were as follows:

Party	Mayoral candidate	Vote	%
**Independent**	**Marianne Alto** †	**15,090**	**55.51**
Independent	Stephen Andrew	9,775	35.96
Independent	Brendan Marshall	1,513	5.57
Independent	Rafael Fuentes	206	0.76
Independent	Lyall Atkinson	175	0.64
Independent	Rod Graham	172	0.63
Independent	David Arthur Johnston	154	0.57
Independent	Michelle Wiboltt	97	0.36

=== Victoria City Council election ===
The results for Victoria City Council were as follows:

Top 8 candidates elected

Party	Council candidate	Vote	%
**Independent**	**Jeremy Caradonna** †	**14,238**	**7.56**
**Independent**	**Susan Kim** †	**14,005**	**7.43**
**Independent**	**Matt Dell** †	**13,899**	**7.38**
**Independent**	**Krista Loughton** †	**12,683**	**6.73**
**Independent**	**Dave Thompson** †	**12,271**	**6.51**
**Independent**	**Chris Coleman** †	**10,785**	**5.72**
**Independent**	**Stephen Hammond** †	**10,042**	**5.33**
**Independent**	**Marg Gardiner** †	**9,255**	**4.91**
Independent	Steve Orcherton	9,188	4.88
Independent	Anna King	9,099	4.83
Independent	Ben Isitt (X)	8,098	4.30
Independent	Janice Williams	7,942	4.21
Independent	Khadoni Pitt Chambers	6,810	3.61
Independent	Tony Yacowar	6,478	3.44
Independent	Susan Simmons	5,130	2.72
Independent	Gary Beyer	5,008	2.66
Independent	Jordan Quitzau	4,093	2.17
VIVA Victoria	Julia Alvarez	2,308	1.22
Independent	Rob Duncan	2,213	1.17
Independent	Derek Pinto	2,150	1.14
Independent	Tom Braybrook	2,103	1.12
VIVA Victoria	Emmanuel Parenteau	2,061	1.09
VIVA Victoria	Jeremy Maddock	2,047	1.09
VIVA Victoria	Brad Sifert	1,833	0.97
VIVA Victoria	Sandy Janzen	1,793	0.95
Independent	Jalal Elarid	1,579	0.84
Independent	William Scott	1,566	0.83
VIVA Victoria	Jason Jones	1,456	0.77
Independent	Brian Klassen	1,454	0.77
Independent	James Harasymow	1,154	0.61
VIVA Victoria	Muller Kalala	1,137	0.60
Independent	Tom Sinclair	1,069	0.57
Independent	Janice Nightingale	990	0.53
Independent	Riga Godron	721	0.38
Independent	Michael Cameron	713	0.38
Independent	Christopher Hanna	665	0.35
Independent	Shea Smith	403	0.21

== West Kelowna ==
The results in West Kelowna were as follows:

=== Mayoral election ===
Mayoral candidate	Vote	%
**Gord Milsom** (X) †	**4,410**	**83.76**
Andrew Kwaczynski	855	16.24

== View Royal ==
The results in View Royal were as follows:

=== Mayoral election ===
Mayoral candidate	Vote	%
**Sid Tobias** †	**1,291**	**54.2**
David Screech (X)	1,055	44.3

== West Vancouver ==
=== Mayoral election ===
The results for mayor of West Vancouver were as follows:

Mayoral candidate	Votes	%
**Mark Sager**	**6,082**	**53.21**
Mary-Ann Booth (X)	2,833	24.78
Marcus Wong	2,436	21.31
Teresa De Cotiis	80	0.70

=== West Vancouver District Council election ===
The results for West Vancouver District Council were as follows:

Top 6 candidates elected

Council candidate	Vote	%
**Linda Watt** †	**5,639**	**10.60**
**Peter Lambur** (X) †	**5,206**	**9.79**
**Sharon Thompson** (X) †	**5,103**	**9.59**
**Scott Snider** †	**4,809**	**9.04**
**Christine Cassidy** †	**4,446**	**8.36**
**Gambioli Nora** (X) †	**3,968**	**7.46**
Ken Schultze	3,382	6.36
Bill Soprovich (X)	3,340	6.28
Claus Jensen	3,102	5.83
Keen Lau	2,701	5.08
Elaine McHarg	2,634	4.95
Alexis Chicoine	2,325	4.37
Alavi Amir	1,609	3.02
David McCosh	1,354	2.55
Eileen Buchanan	1,295	2.43
Tyler Blair	1,263	2.37
Rima Martinez	1,015	1.91

== Whistler ==
The results in Whistler were as follows:

=== Mayoral election ===
Mayoral candidate	Votes	%
**Jack D. Crompton** (X) †	**2,153**	**66.8**
Marcus L. Culver	712	22.1
Brian T. Walker	259	8.0

== White Rock ==
The results in White Rock were as follows:

=== Mayoral election ===
Mayoral candidate	Votes	%
**Megan Knight** †	**2,001**	**37.5**
Darryl Walker (X)	1,811	33.9
Erika Johanson	833	15.6
Scott Kristjanson	667	12.5

== Williams Lake ==
The results in Williams Lake were as follows:

=== Mayoral election ===
Mayoral candidate	Votes	%
**Surinderpal Rathor** †	**1,091**	**34.1**
Jason Ryll	898	28.1
Walt L. Cobb (X)	773	24.2
Kerry Cook	427	13.4
