= Fred Haynes =

Canadian politician

His worship Fred J. Haynes

Mayor of Saanich, British Columbia
- In office November 5, 2018 – November 7, 2022
- Preceded by: Richard Atwell
- Succeeded by: Dean Murdock

Personal details
- Born: c. 1952 England
- Party: Independent
- Spouse: Cathy Haynes
- Children: 3
- Occupation: business owner

Fred J. Haynes (born c. 1952) is a British-Canadian politician. He served as the mayor of Saanich, British Columbia from 2018 until 2022. Prior to being elected, Haynes was a high school teacher, university instructor, business networking tool publisher and business and economic development consultant. He is also an aikido instructor, in which he has an eighth degree black belt.

== Early life ==
Haynes grew up in Kings Cross, London, the son of a seamstress mother and carpenter father. He is one of five children, and is a twin. His mother was diagnosed with schizophrenia, resulting in his father having to support the family. While in England, he received a bachelor's degree in education from Victoria University. In England, he worked as a high school teacher. He then moved to Canada and earned a master's degree in science from the University of Guelph and a PhD in medical research from the University of Toronto. At the age of 36, he moved to Tokyo where he worked for a pharmaceutical company writing science papers. In Tokyo, he trained with the riot police, and met his wife Cathy, who is from Australia, and also has a black belt in aikido. After living in Japan, he moved back to Canada, eventually settling in Saanich in 2002.

== Councillor ==
Haynes ran for a spot on Saanich District Council in the 2014 municipal elections, running on a platform of keeping the cost of living affordable, economic development and government transparency. He was elected to council, finishing in 5th place (top 8 are elected), winning 13,492 votes. He had worked in grassroots community organizations in Saanich for 11 years prior to running for council.

Haynes started working on Coop housing in 2015, when he brought forward a motion in support of You Hold the Key Campaign, which sought provincially delivered rent supplement program for lower income co-op members. His motion also requested the federal government commit to reinvesting in co-ops.

In 2016, Haynes brought a motion to the Union of BC Municipalities conference to have the Province create new funding formulas for on-campus housing.

Haynes was a founding board member of Connections Place Victoria in 2016.

== Mayoralty ==
Haynes ran for mayor in the 2018 municipal elections, taking on incumbent mayor Richard Atwell. Haynes defeated Atwell by nearly 5,000 votes, winning with 48 per cent of the vote. The election was embroiled in some legal confrontation.

Upon becoming Mayor, Haynes established the Mayor's standing committee on housing to help address housing affordability. This resulted in an award-winning housing strategy. The strategy's intention was to build on existing actions, support partnerships, and focus on efforts on areas within municipal influence, and be focused on urban areas near centres, villages and corridors, with the intention of addressing climate change, preserving the natural environment, achieving transit-oriented development, and building walkable and healthy communities.

At the 2019 Union of BC Municipalities conference, Haynes indicated his support for lowering the voting age in municipal elections to 16.

In 2022, he brought forward a new resolution to Council, that Saanich explore using its municipal lands for co-op housing.

During his time as Mayor, the municipality won several awards for their climate action policies and initiatives. Saanich also adopted a plan to ban single-use plastic grocery bags.

As Mayor of Saanich, he served as Chair of the Saanich Police board, and oversaw the installation of two police chiefs, Scott Green and Dean Duffy who were appointed under the new fixed-term contract agreement.

== Defeat ==
A year before the 2022 municipal elections, Haynes announced he was running for re-election, citing "progress on climate action, road safety, equity and diversity and housing" as his accomplishments as mayor. Haynes lost his attempt at re-election to former councillor Dean Murdock by just 152 votes. He ran on a campaign focusing on the environment, housing and affordability. During the campaign, Murdock criticized Haynes for "the slow pace of progress.. on the affordability crisis".

Following his defeat, he was fined $150 by Elections BC for "not including an authorization statement on display advertising."
