= Dean Murdock =

Canadian politician

Mayor of Saanich, British Columbia
- In office November 7, 2022 – November 2, 2026
- Preceded by: Fred Haynes
- Succeeded by: Rishi Sharma

Personal details
- Born: October 8, 1981 (age 45) Vancouver
- Spouse(s): Keeley (m. 2004; div.); Rachel Deloughery (m. 2021)
- Children: 2
- Occupation: Civil servant, instructor

Colin Dean Murdock (born October 8, 1981) is a Canadian politician. He has served as the mayor of Saanich, British Columbia since 2022.

== Early life and career ==
Murdock was born at the Vancouver General Hospital to parents Randy and Linda Murdock (née Carswell), though he credits his birthplace as Richmond, British Columbia. His father was a safety inspector for a Molson brewery. The family moved to Saanich in 1993. Murdock grew up in the Cordova Bay neighbourhood, and attended Royal Oak Middle School and Claremont Secondary School. He attended Camosun College, and then the University of Victoria, where he took social sciences. He graduated with a bachelor's degree in 2003 and a Masters in 2007. After university, he lived in Japan where he taught English.

Prior to his election as mayor, Murdock worked as a political science instructor at Camosun College for three years, and worked for the BC Ministry of Health and the BC Ministry of Transportation and Infrastructure. He worked in the Ministry of Health for 17 years. Murdock served as chair of the Sierra Club Victoria from 2007 to 2008.

== Early electoral experience ==
Murdock first ran for office in 1999 at the age of 18, when he ran for school board representing School District 63 Saanich Peninsula. He earned 1,477 votes in the Saanich zone, missing a spot on the board by 59 votes.

While a student at the University of Victoria, Murdock ran for a council by-election in Saanich in 2001 caused by the resignation of Sheila Orr, who was elected to the BC Legislative Assembly. He ran for council again in the 2002 municipal elections, winning 4,667 votes, finishing 11th on the 8 seat body.

== District Council ==
Murdock ran again for council in the 2008 British Columbia municipal elections on platform of "making an efficient transportation network, a healthy ecosystem and protection for green space and agricultural land". In the election, Murdock was finally elected to council, winning 9,079 votes, in sixth position.

Murdock endorsed Mike Farnworth's campaign in the 2011 British Columbia New Democratic Party leadership election.

Murdock was re-elected to council in the 2011 municipal elections, winning 11,899 votes, in fifth spot. He ran again in the 2014 municipal elections, running on a platform of creating a "variety of new housing options", addressing transportation needs, and "standing up for farmland" in the district. In the election, Murdock topped the poll, winning 14,781 votes. While on council, he served as a director on the Capital Regional District from 2017 to 2018. His main focus as a councillor was on housing affordability, food security issues, emission reductions, and safety for pedestrians and cyclists.

Murdock did not run for re-election in the 2018 municipal elections, citing family reasons. After his term on council, he created a group called "Better Mobility Saanich" in an effort to identify dangerous walking and cycling routes to schools in order to improve active transportation infrastructure. He also hosted a podcast called Amazing Places.

== Mayoralty ==
Murdock announced his intentions to run for mayor of Saanich in October 2021, a full year before the 2022 mayoral election. At his campaign launch, he announced "It's time for new leadership at city hall". He was endorsed by former councillors Carol Pickup and David Cubberley.

Murdock was elected mayor of Saanich in the 2022 election, defeating incumbent mayor Fred Haynes by just 152 votes. Murdock ran on a platform of tackling housing affordability, creating accessible and walkable neighbourhoods and protecting against climate change. During the campaign, Murdock criticized Haynes for "the slow pace of progress.. on the affordability crisis".

As mayor, one of the main issues Murdock has had to deal with is balancing the province's mandate of building more housing and residents' opposition and concerns about new projects in the municipality. Murdock supports the provincial government's housing targets. Another issue in Saanich that Murdock has had to deal with as mayor include calls from the police department for an increase in their budget due to "lack of bodies responding to calls" causing a reduction is safety for officers.

In February 2026, Murdock announced that he would not seek re-election as mayor in the 2026 municipal election, citing the demands of public service.
