= Reid Hamer-Jackson =

Canadian politician (born 1958)

Mayor of Kamloops
- In office November 1, 2022 – November 2, 2026
- Preceded by: Ken Christian
- Succeeded by: Mike O'Reilly

Personal details
- Born: October 27, 1958 North Vancouver, British Columbia
- Spouse: Lori
- Children: 3
- Profession: Businessperson

Reid Allan Hamer-Jackson (born October 27, 1958) is a Canadian politician. He has served as mayor of Kamloops, British Columbia since 2022. His tenure as mayor has been marred by controversy regarding his relationship with city council and staff.

== Early life ==
Hamer-Jackson was born at the North Vancouver General Hospital in North Vancouver, the son of Maurice "Hamer" (né Chasney) and Diana Hamer-Jackson (née King).

Hamer-Jackson first moved to Kamloops in 1973, where he attended Brocklehurst Middle School. His father kicked him out of the home, a move which Hamer-Jackson later claimed did him a favour. He lived on the streets in Edmonton before his family offered him a job at a ranch in the Cariboo. He began working as a car salesman in the early 1980s, and has owned TRU Market Truck and Auto Sales since 1994.

== Election ==
In March 2022, he announced his intentions to run for mayor of Kamloops following the announcement that mayor Ken Christian would not run for re-election. Prior to his announcement, he had been outspoken on the city's vulnerable population, suggesting a wellness centre be built away from the core of the city.

Hamer-Jackson was elected in the 2022 mayoral election, winning 32 per cent of the vote, defeating city councillor Dieter Dudy by 1,648 votes. Hamer-Jackson ran on a platform "emphasizing safety and accountability". He was especially concerned with the city's shelter system, suggesting "[t]hey're not as full as we think". Prior to his election, he had no political experience. His election was part of a wave of centre-right mayors being elected in the province, which was seen as a response to rising crime and homelessness in the province.

== Mayoralty ==
In just his first month of office, Hamer-Jackson was asked by local homeless shelters to stop visiting them unannounced. He had been showing up to them, sometimes in the middle of the night, with people in need of shelter. BC Housing issued a statement saying his visits were "'disruptive' to staff', suggesting his future visits be pre-arranged.

In December 2022, Hamer-Jackson recused himself for an entire city council meeting, never returning for the day. He cited "potential conflicts of interest". The move was seen as unusual as typically someone with a conflict of interest would only recuse themselves for a particular agenda item. Members of council stated that he had not followed proper protocols.

In March 2023, city council voted to pause standing committees after Hamer-Jackson began replacing city councillors on the committees with members of the general public, including two people who unsuccessfully ran for city council. Council called his move "chaotic and unpredictable.. [leading] to confusion and misinformation". A special committee was later formed with Hamer-Jackson and three councillors to determine the make up of standing committees in the city.

In June 2023, Hamer-Jackson filed a defamation lawsuit against city councillor Katie Neustaeter. He alleged that she made comments about him having a political relationship with her father, Kevin Krueger, a former MLA. Hamer-Jackson stated that the comments had led to people in the community speculating that he had committed crimes against her, such as sexual harassment or assault. City council voted that Neustaeter would be eligible to have her legal costs paid by the city, which Hamer-Jackson was disappointed with.

In August 2023, following complaints of "inappropriate conduct" at city hall, it was deemed that Hamer-Jackson would not be allowed to meet with the city's chief administrator officer or city staffers without the presence of a third party. The investigation was conducted by a Vancouver firm which had been hired by the city of Kamloops. It had deemed that his conduct "violated the code of conduct numerous times".

In September 2023, Hamer-Jackson had to shelve a motion to provide transport vouchers to the city's homeless population so that they could return to their "home communities", a proposal he had campaigned for during the mayoral election. He had hoped the federal government's "Reaching Home" grant would help fund the initiative, but the city indicated that funding would not be available.

Also in September 2023, city council voted to investigate the mayor for recording a private conversation with the city's chief administrative officer, breaking a rule against recording private conversations with city staff. Hamer-Jackson stated that it was only recorded for "note-taking purposes".

In October 2023, city council voted unanimously to ask the provincial government to help the city deal with "lawsuits, investigations and concerns" relating to Hamer-Jackson's conduct.

In December 2023, Hamer-Jackson's burnt-out SUV was removed from his property by the city's fire chief while Hamer-Jackson was on vacation. The mayor had been repeatedly asked by the chief to remove it as it was seen as a fire hazard, but Hamer-Jackson refused.

In March 2024, Hamer-Jackson suspended the city's chief administrative officer, but city council reversed the decision two days later. Hamer-Jackson stated the dismissal was because the CAO did not do enough to address community safety and crime concerns in the city.

On May 7, 2024, former Abbotsford mayor Henry Braun who had been hired by the provincial government publicized a report which was critical of Hamer-Jackson's behaviour with city council and staff. It suggested he had a "a dismissive and condescending attitude towards constructive criticism or the suggestion of apologies". This prompted council to vote 8–1 for his resignation, with Hamer-Jackson being the only dissenting vote. The vote was non-binding. Later in the month, city council voted to take away Hamer-Jackson's role as serving as the city's spokesperson, one of the main responsibilities for the city's mayor. Hamer-Jackson stated that there has been a "co-ordinated strategy" by councillors opposed to him since he was elected. The mayor has been accused of having "poor communication skills, won't accept responsibility, ignores confidentiality protocols and misunderstands the rules ... [of] conflict of interest".
