= Tom Dyas =

Canadian politician

His worship Tom Dyas

Mayor of Kelowna
- Incumbent
- Assumed office November 7, 2022
- Preceded by: Colin Basran

Personal details
- Born: Thomas John Dyas
- Children: 3

Thomas John Dyas is a Canadian politician and businessman who has served as the mayor of Kelowna since 2022.

== Early life ==
Dyas' parents were Thomas "Harry" Dyas, an immigrant from Blackheath, England and Hilda Ann Holtforster, who was born in Trout Creek, Ontario. His parents lived in Oshawa, Ontario.

Dyas moved to British Columbia in 1986 to become a sous chef, becoming executive chef of Delta Hotels while living in Whistler. In 1987, he created an insurance and financial company called TD Benefits. He would later become the president of the Kelowna Chamber of Commerce, serving for two terms until 2018. During this time, he led Kelowna's bid to host the 2020 Memorial Cup (which was later cancelled due to the COVID-19 pandemic).

== Political career ==
Dyas first ran for mayor of Kelowna in 2018, citing the need for "leadership... at city hall", and ran on a plan on financial accountability, citizen safety, transportation and infrastructure, water management and sustainable managed growth. He ran against the incumbent mayor, Colin Basran, who had previously been a close friend of Dyas'. His platform was described as returning the region to its "conservative roots" as "a no-nonsense, tax cutting, small businessman", compared to Basran who had the backing from the "progressive tech industry". Basran easily defeated Dyas in the election by nearly 9,000 votes.

A year after Kelowna was declared to have the highest crime rate in the country, Dyas ran for mayor again in 2022, in a re-match against Basran, stating "a lot of concerns people have in the community have gotten worse". In the election, Dyas defeated Basran by over 10,000 votes. He cited, crime, housing, and traffic as major issues in the election. The 2022 municipal elections saw a wave of centre-right mayors come to office as a response to rising crime and homelessness in the province. Dyas' campaign was managed by Adam Wilson who has "strong ties to the Conservative Party".

While serving as mayor, the Kelowna area was severely hit by the McDougall Creek Fire. Also during his term as mayor, he has called for municipal parks to be exempted from the province's plans on drug decriminalization, due to a concern it "may create an influx of drug users from other provinces to parks in Kelowna during the summer". In 2026, Dyas was re-elected as mayor, narrowly defeating Ron Cannan in one of the province's closest rates in the 2026 municipal elections, based on preliminary election results.
