= Ron Cannan =

Canadian politician

The Honourable Ronald D Cannan PC

Member of Parliament for Kelowna—Lake Country
- In office January 23, 2006 – August 4, 2015
- Preceded by: Werner Schmidt
- Succeeded by: Stephen Fuhr

Personal details
- Born: May 8, 1961 (age 65) Edmonton, Alberta
- Party: Conservative
- Spouse: Cindy Cannan
- Profession: Advertising consultant, business manager, politician

Ronald D. E. Cannan (born May 8, 1961 in Edmonton, Alberta) is a Canadian politician who has served on the Kelowna City Council since 2022, a role he also held from 1996 to 2005. He also served as the member of Parliament (MP) for the riding of Kelowna—Lake Country from 2006 to 2015.

== Family background ==
Cannan and his wife Cindy (whom he married in 1984 in Edmonton, Alberta) have three adult daughters and grandchildren all living in Kelowna. They moved to Kelowna in 1990.

== Career background ==
Prior to entering politics, Cannan was involved in marketing and advertising sales.

=== Municipal politics (1996–2005) ===
Cannan was first elected to Kelowna City Council in the 1996 civic election for a three-year term. He was re-elected in the next two elections and served a total of nine years on Kelowna City Council. During this time, he also served as a director for the Central Okanagan Regional District. Cannan returned to local politics on October 15, 2022, when he topped the polls and was elected to Kelowna City Council. During his time on Kelowna's city council, Cannan was appointed to various local government boards, commissions, and other similar bodies.

=== Federal politics (2006–2015) ===
In 2005, Cannan won the Conservative Party nomination for the riding of Kelowna—Lake Country, which was being vacated by retiring MP Werner Schmidt. He was subsequently elected in the 2006 federal election by capturing 49 per cent of the vote. He was re-elected in the 2008 and 2011 elections capturing more than 50 per cent of the vote each time.

In the 2015 federal election, Cannan was defeated by Liberal challenger Stephen Fuhr, who took 46 per cent of the vote to Cannan's 40 per cent. This election marked the first time since the 1968 federal election that a right-of-centre party failed to capture the Kelowna riding.

Cannan was one of three MPs not in cabinet to serve on the Treasury Board Sub-Committee on Government Administration and became entitled to the title "Honourable" as a member of the Queen's Privy Council for Canada.

=== Return to municipal politics (2022 to present) ===
Cannan was elected to the Kelowna City Council in 2022. In 2026, Cannan sought election to the mayor's office, but was defeated by incumbent mayor Tom Dyas in one of the province's closest municipal election races, based on preliminary election results.

== Election results ==
2015 Canadian federal election: Kelowna—Lake Country
| Party | Candidate | Votes | % | ±% | Expenditures |
|---|---|---|---|---|---|
| Liberal | Stephen Fuhr | 29,614 | 46.16 | +34.69 | $127,725.08 |
| Conservative | Ron Cannan | 25,502 | 39.75 | –18.63 | $70,942.48 |
| New Democratic | Norah Mary Bowman | 9,039 | 14.09 | –7.28 | $33,945.86 |
| Total valid votes/expense limit | | 64,155 | 99.64 | – | $228,718.18 |
| Total rejected ballots | | 230 | 0.36 | | |
| Turnout | | 64,385 | 70.65 | | |
| Eligible voters | | 91,131 | | | |
| Liberal gain from Conservative | | Swing | | +26.66 | |
Source: Elections Canada

2011 Canadian federal election: Kelowna—Lake Country
| Party | Candidate | Votes | % | ±% | Expenditures |
|---|---|---|---|---|---|
| Conservative | Ron Cannan | 34,566 | 57.40 | +1.46 | $88,677.16 |
| New Democratic | Patricia (Tisha) Kalmanovitch | 13,322 | 22.12 | +7.00 | $11,822.65 |
| Liberal | Kris Stewart | 7,069 | 11.74 | –3.11 | $49,198.04 |
| Green | Alice Hooper | 5,265 | 8.74 | –4.97 | $12,374.76 |
| Total valid votes/expense limit | | 60,222 | 99.76 | – | $100,986.29 |
| Total rejected ballots | | 146 | 0.24 | –0.05 | |
| Turnout | | 60,368 | 59.84 | +1.08 | |
| Eligible voters | | 100,884 | | | |
| Conservative hold | | Swing | | +4.23 | |
Source: Elections Canada

2008 Canadian federal election: Kelowna—Lake Country
| Party | Candidate | Votes | % | ±% | Expenditures |
|---|---|---|---|---|---|
| Conservative | Ron Cannan | 31,907 | 55.94 | +6.77 | $67,837.92 |
| New Democratic | Tish Lakes | 8,624 | 15.12 | –1.53 | $8,272.92 |
| Liberal | Diana Cabott | 8,469 | 14.85 | –10.99 | $37,536.07 |
| Green | Angela Reid | 7,821 | 13.71 | +5.75 | $13,138.26 |
| Communist | Mark Haley | 218 | 0.38 | – | $566.35 |
| Total valid votes/expense limit | | 57,039 | 99.71 | – | $95,647.41 |
| Total rejected ballots | | 168 | 0.29 | +0.09 | |
| Turnout | | 57,207 | 58.76 | –4.63 | |
| Eligible voters | | 97,351 | | | |
| Conservative hold | | Swing | | +4.15 | |
Source: Elections Canada

2006 Canadian federal election: Kelowna—Lake Country
| Party | Candidate | Votes | % | ±% | Expenditures |
|---|---|---|---|---|---|
| Conservative | Ron Cannan | 28,174 | 49.17 | +1.17 | $63,555.52 |
| Liberal | Vern Nielsen | 14,807 | 25.84 | –0.66 | $50,271.52 |
| New Democratic | Kevin M. Hagglund | 9,538 | 16.64 | –0.16 | $12,393.35 |
| Green | Angela Reid | 4,562 | 7.96 | +0.66 | $5,359.73 |
| Canadian Action | David Thomson | 223 | 0.39 | –0.11 | $1,290.73 |
| Total valid votes/expense limit | | 57,304 | 99.80 | – | $85,928.84 |
| Total rejected ballots | | 116 | 0.20 | – | |
| Turnout | | 57,420 | 63.40 | – | |
| Eligible voters | | 90,574 | | | |
| Conservative hold | | Swing | | – | |
Source: Elections Canada
