= Jagmeet Singh =

Canadian politician (born 1979)

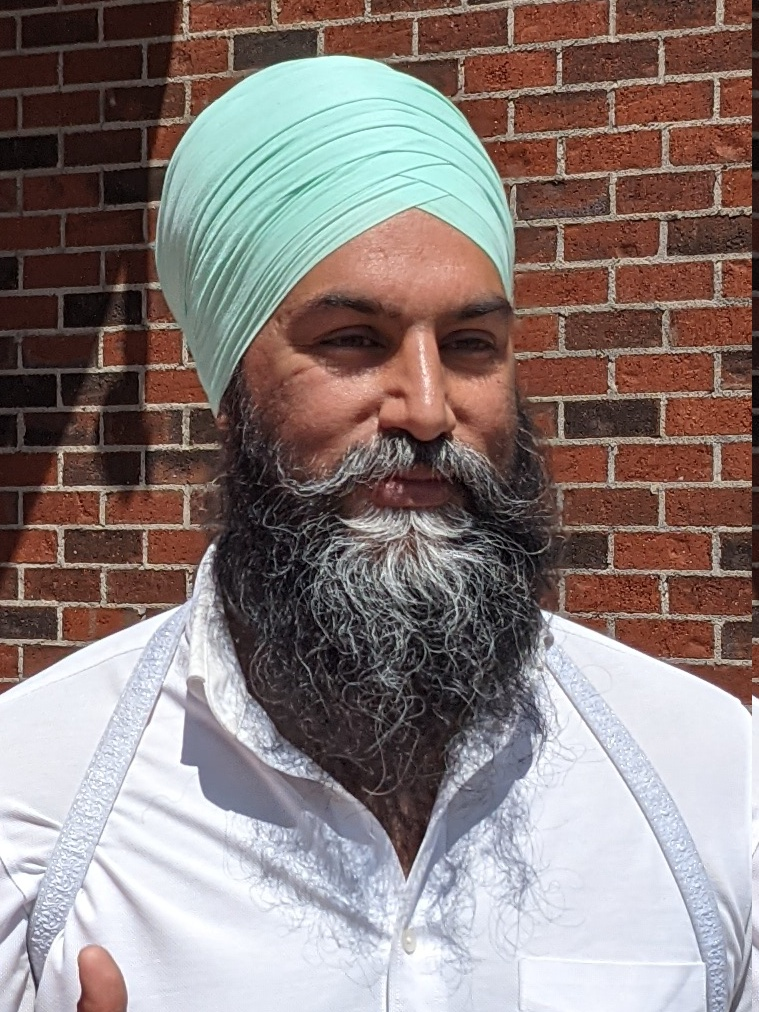
- Singh in 2022

Leader of the New Democratic Party
- In office October 1, 2017 – May 5, 2025
- Deputy: David Christopherson; Sheri Benson; Alexandre Boulerice
- Preceded by: Tom Mulcair
- Succeeded by: Don Davies (interim)

Member of Parliament for Burnaby South
- In office February 25, 2019 – April 28, 2025
- Preceded by: Kennedy Stewart
- Succeeded by: Riding abolished; Wade Chang (Burnaby Central)

Member of Provincial Parliament for Bramalea—Gore—Malton
- In office October 6, 2011 – October 20, 2017
- Preceded by: Kuldip Kular
- Succeeded by: Riding abolished

Personal details
- Born: Jagmeet Singh Jimmy Dhaliwal; January 2, 1979 (age 47) Scarborough, Ontario, Canada
- Party: New Democratic; Ontario NDP
- Spouse: Gurkiran Kaur Sidhu (m. 2018)
- Children: 2
- Relatives: Gurratan Singh (brother)
- Education: University of Western Ontario (BSc); York University (LLB)
- Website: www.jagmeetsingh.ca

Jagmeet Singh Jimmy Dhaliwal (Note: /dʒəɡˈmiːt ˈsɪŋ/ jəg-MEET SING) (born January 2, 1979) is a Canadian politician and lawyer who served as the leader of the New Democratic Party (NDP) from 2017 to 2025 and as the member of Parliament (MP) for Burnaby South from 2019 to 2025. He was first elected in 2011, representing Bramalea—Gore—Malton in the Legislative Assembly of Ontario until his entry into federal politics. A Canadian-born practising Sikh of Punjabi descent, he is the first member of a visible minority group elected to lead a major Canadian federal political party.

After graduating from Osgoode Hall Law School, Singh became a criminal defence lawyer, starting a law firm with his brother Gurratan. In 2011 his political career began when he contested the 2011 federal election in the federal riding of Bramalea—Gore—Malton which resulted in a narrow victory for Conservative opponent Bal Gosal; he became a member of Provincial Parliament (MPP) in the overlapping provincial riding later that year. In 2015, he became deputy leader of the Ontario New Democratic Party, serving under leader Andrea Horwath until 2017. Singh announced his candidacy for the federal New Democratic Party leadership following a leadership review that resulted in a leadership election to replace Tom Mulcair. Singh was elected leader on October 1, 2017, with a first round vote of 53.8 per cent in a field of four.

Upon his election, Singh became the first person of a visible minority group to lead a major Canadian federal political party on a permanent basis, and the second overall after the Bloc Québécois’s former interim leader Vivian Barbot. Singh is also the first turban-wearing Sikh to sit as a provincial legislator in Ontario. He has been widely recognized in Canadian media for his fashion and style sense. Ideologically, Singh identifies as both a progressive and a social democrat. In the 2019 federal election, the New Democrats under Singh lost 15 seats and dropped from third party to fourth party status. In the 2021 federal election, the NDP gained one seat and remained the fourth party. In 2022, his party signed a confidence and supply agreement with the governing Liberal Party, which resulted in the enactment of the Canadian Dental Care Plan and a framework for national pharmacare; in 2024, the NDP terminated the agreement.

At the 2025 federal election, Singh led the NDP to its worst result in party history, losing official party status and being himself defeated in the riding of Burnaby Central. On election night, he announced that he would resign as party leader; he was replaced by Vancouver Kingsway MP Don Davies on an interim basis until Avi Lewis was elected in the March 2026 leadership election.

== Early life and education (1979–2006) ==
Jagmeet Singh Jimmy Dhaliwal was born on January 2, 1979 in the city of Scarborough, Ontario, now a district of Toronto, to Indian immigrants, Harmeet Kaur and Jagtaran Dhaliwal. His parents are both from the Malwa region of the Indian state of Punjab, with his mother being from Ghudani Khurd in Ludhiana district, while his father is from Thikriwala in Barnala district. Singh belongs to the Dhaliwal clan of Jat Sikhs.

Singh's great-grandfather was Sewa Singh Thikriwala, a political activist who campaigned for the cause of Indian independence. Another great-grandfather, Hira Singh, served in World War I and World War II in the Sikh Regiment of the British Indian Army. After a year as a toddler living with his grandparents in India, Singh spent his early childhood in St. John's and Grand Falls-Windsor, both in Newfoundland and Labrador, before relocating with his family to Windsor, Ontario. Singh has publicly discussed suffering sexual abuse as a child from a martial arts coach, as well as having a father who struggled with alcoholism.

From grades 6 to 12, Singh attended Detroit Country Day School in Beverly Hills, Michigan. He went on to obtain a B.Sc. degree in biology from the University of Western Ontario in 2001 and in 2005 graduated as a Bachelor of Laws from York University's Osgoode Hall Law School. He was called to the bar of Ontario in 2006.

Singh has two younger siblings, brother Gurratan and sister Manjot, who were both born during the family's time in Newfoundland. Gurratan Singh was elected to the Legislative Assembly of Ontario in the 2018 Ontario election, representing the riding of Brampton East.

== Early career (2006–2011) ==
Singh worked as a criminal defence lawyer in the Greater Toronto Area before entering politics, first at the law firm Pinkofskys, then at his own practice, Singh Law, which he established with Gurratan. In a Toronto Star article published on January 9, 2012, Singh stated that his background in criminal defence contributed to his decision to enter politics, particularly his work advocating for the protection of rights entrenched in the Canadian Charter of Rights and Freedoms.

Singh provided pro bono consulting to an activist group that protested the visit to Canada of Kamal Nath, the former Indian trade minister who had allegedly led armed counter terrorist groups, against Sikh separatists, during the 1984 Delhi riots. After failing to get their views heard, Singh was inspired to run for office by the activist group so their concerns could be better represented.

Singh began his political career with his decision to run for member of Parliament in the 2011 federal election as the NDP candidate in the riding of Bramalea—Gore—Malton. During the election, Singh stopped using his surname, Dhaliwal (which is connected to caste), because he wanted to signal his rejection of the inequality inherent in the caste system. Instead, he chose to use the more common Singh. Although he was defeated by Conservative candidate Bal Gosal by 539 votes, Singh finished ahead of incumbent Liberal MP, Gurbax Singh Malhi.

== Provincial politics (2011–2017) ==
=== First term (2011–2014) ===
==== Election ====
Singh ran in the 2011 Ontario provincial election as the NDP candidate in the overlapping provincial riding, defeating Liberal incumbent Kuldip Kular by 2,277 votes. Singh became the first New Democrat elected to represent the Peel Region, as well as the first turban-wearing MPP. In the 40th Parliament of Ontario, Singh was appointed as the NDP critic for the attorney general and consumer services portfolios. He also served as his party's deputy house leader.

==== Activities ====
Singh called for greater police accountability and demanded the provincial government draft legislation to strengthen Ontario's Special Investigations Unit (SIU). He criticized the attorney general in 2011 after the release of a report by the ombudsman, André Marin, that found the province had undermined the SIU. Singh said, "The comprehensive failure of the ministry to address concerns about the SIU and give it a proper mandate is simply unacceptable, and I expect immediate action from the new Attorney General."

In March 2012, Singh introduced a private member's bill, "An Act to Amend the Insurance Act", to address high auto insurance rates. This bill would have ended the industry practice of basing insurance rates on geographic location. The bill received numerous complaints that it would have raised rates in rural and Northern Ontario and failed to pass second reading.

In May 2012, Singh introduced a private member's bill called "An Act to amend the Consumer Protection Act, 2002" to address high fees on overseas money transfers. The bill died on the order paper when the legislature was prorogued in September 2012.

In March 2013, Singh introduced a motion calling on the Liberal government to reduce auto insurance premiums by 15 percent. Singh's motion was passed by the legislature, and the 15 percent reduction was to be included in the Liberal government's 2013 budget.

In December 2013, legislation introduced by Singh to have the month of April recognized as Sikh Heritage Month in the province of Ontario was passed by the legislature.

=== Second term (2014–2017) ===
==== Re-election ====
Singh won his riding in 2014 with 43.6 per cent of the vote, beating Liberal challenger Kuldip Kular, whom Singh had unseated in 2011, and PC challenger Harjit Jaswal.

==== Activities ====
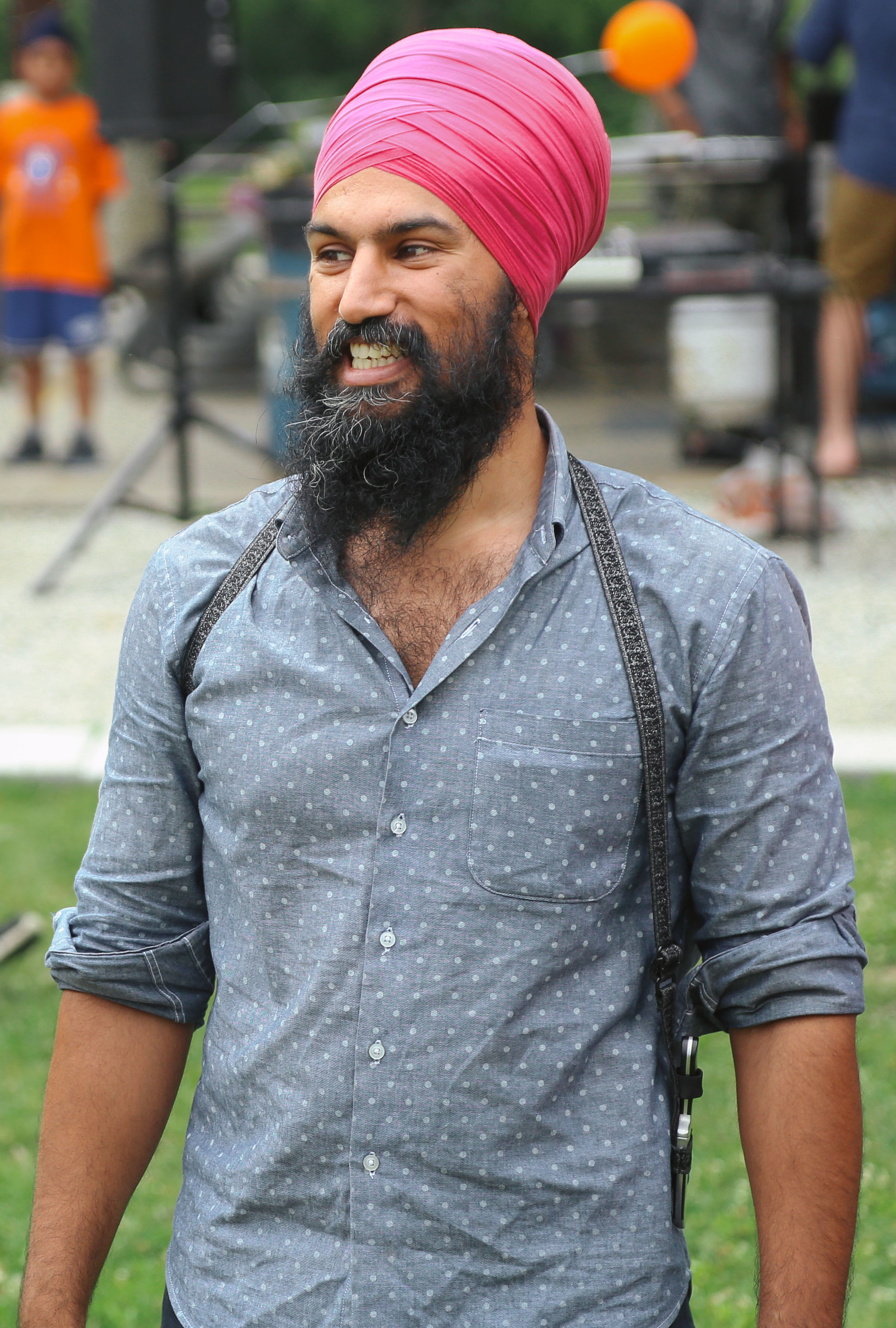
Singh at a community BBQ in 2014

In November 2014, Singh voted against the government's legislation entitled "Fighting Fraud and Reducing Automobile Rates Act", after arguing there were major shortcomings in the legislation regarding the driver's right to sue auto insurance companies. Singh said, "removing more protections for people is not the right way to go, it's a significant loss of our rights, and this is not a good bill."

In March 2015, during the Ontario sex education curriculum controversy, Singh spoke out against changes to the curriculum which had not been updated since 1998 and proposal changes on teaching on sexual orientation and gender identity. Singh said he disagreed with the "age appropriateness of some materials" and a "mistake on the Liberal government’s part" and "disrespectful to parents".

In November 2015, Singh introduced a private member's bill to the legislature regarding Tarion. Tarion was created by the provincial government in 1976 to be the regulator of the province's homebuilding industry. Singh's proposed legislation would give the Ontario Ombudsman the jurisdiction to investigate the practices of the corporation, as well as force Tarion to produce a detailed track record of their builds, and include all of their employees who make over $100,000 on the sunshine list. The proposed legislation would also subject Tarion bylaws to the approval of the provincial government.

In October 2015, Singh introduced a motion calling on the government to instruct police services in Ontario to end arbitrary street checks, known as carding. On October 22, 2015, the legislature unanimously passed Singh's motion.

Singh sparked controversy when he introduced a private members bill to allow turban-wearing Sikhs to ride a motorcycle without a helmet. After the motion was denied, Singh released statement declaring "While the Wynne Liberals are happy to pay lip service to civil rights, when the rubber meets the road, this so-called activist premier is quick to deny the Sikh community rights recognized elsewhere". Wynne countered by stating that "Mortality rates have gone down 30 per cent and head injury rates down 75 per cent in jurisdictions with such (motorcycle helmet) laws".

Singh was a critic of the province's handling of the Ornge Air Ambulance service and called for greater oversight of the agency. Ornge was the subject of an investigation that found the air ambulance service paid a $1.4 million salary to its president while failing to provide timely emergency services. Singh said, "No more flying blind at Ornge. The people of Ontario have been paying the bills at Ornge with scarce health dollars. They deserve the facts about what's happened. A key first step is making executive contracts immediately available to the public."

In June 2015, Singh was chastised by the integrity commissioner for the improper use of legislative resources meant for his constituency office for partisan purposes. The integrity commissioner's report found that in March 2015, Singh had improperly allowed his constituency office in Brampton to organize bus trips to take supporters to a partisan federal NDP rally in Toronto and that Singh's inclusion of a donation link on his constituency website contravened parliamentary convention. Because Singh did not intentionally break the ethics policy and had proactively acted to fix the breaches when alerted, he was not fined or otherwise punished, and the integrity commissioner only recommended that Singh's staff undergo additional training.

In December 2016, Singh spoke out against the motion introduced by Progressive Conservative MPP Gila Martow, which called for the legislature to denounce the Boycott, Divestment and Sanctions campaign.

On October 20, 2017, after winning the federal NDP leadership race, Singh resigned as MPP.

=== Outside Ontario ===
During the Alberta general election in May 2015, Singh campaigned for the Alberta New Democratic Party, reaching out to voters on behalf of Irfan Sabir, who was running in Calgary-McCall. Sabir was later elected, and was appointed to Premier Rachel Notley's Cabinet as Minister of Social Services. Singh also campaigned for the British Columbia NDP and Nova Scotia NDP in those provinces' 2017 elections.

Singh endorsed and campaigned for Wab Kinew in the Manitoba NDP's 2017 leadership race.

Following the death of communist leader Fidel Castro in October 2017, Singh tweeted "He saw a country wracked by poverty, illiteracy & disease. So he led a revolution that uplifted the lives of millions. RIP #FidelCastro". When challenged about this subsequently, he reiterated his praise for Castro.

== Leader of the New Democratic Party (2017–2025) ==
=== 2017 leadership election ===
After Tom Mulcair lost a leadership review vote at the 2016 federal NDP convention, Singh was considered a potential leadership candidate, winning the support of 11 per cent of NDP members in a Mainstreet Research poll conducted in April 2016 and was statistically tied for second place. Singh was also considered a leading candidate to replace Horwath as the Ontario NDP leader if she lost the 42nd Ontario general election. He announced his intention to run for the leadership of the New Democratic Party of Canada at a campaign launch on May 15, 2017, in Brampton.

In August, Singh created controversy when he claimed that his candidacy had led to 47,000 sign-ups for the party. Several rival campaigns, most notably that of Charlie Angus, accused Singh of inflating party membership sign-ups. A poll by Mainstreet Research was released in September, showing Singh overtaking Charlie Angus to lead the race for the first time with 27.3 per cent of the vote. Several days before the leadership vote, a video of Singh confronting a heckler, who accused him of plotting to subject Canada to sharia law, went viral, leading to Singh getting praise for his handling of the situation and boosting him in the leadership race.

The leadership election was held on October 1, 2017, and Singh won on the first ballot with 53.8 per cent of the vote; Angus came second, Niki Ashton third, and Guy Caron fourth. Soon afterward, Singh named leadership rival Caron as parliamentary leader of the NDP.

=== Leading from outside Parliament (2017–2019) ===
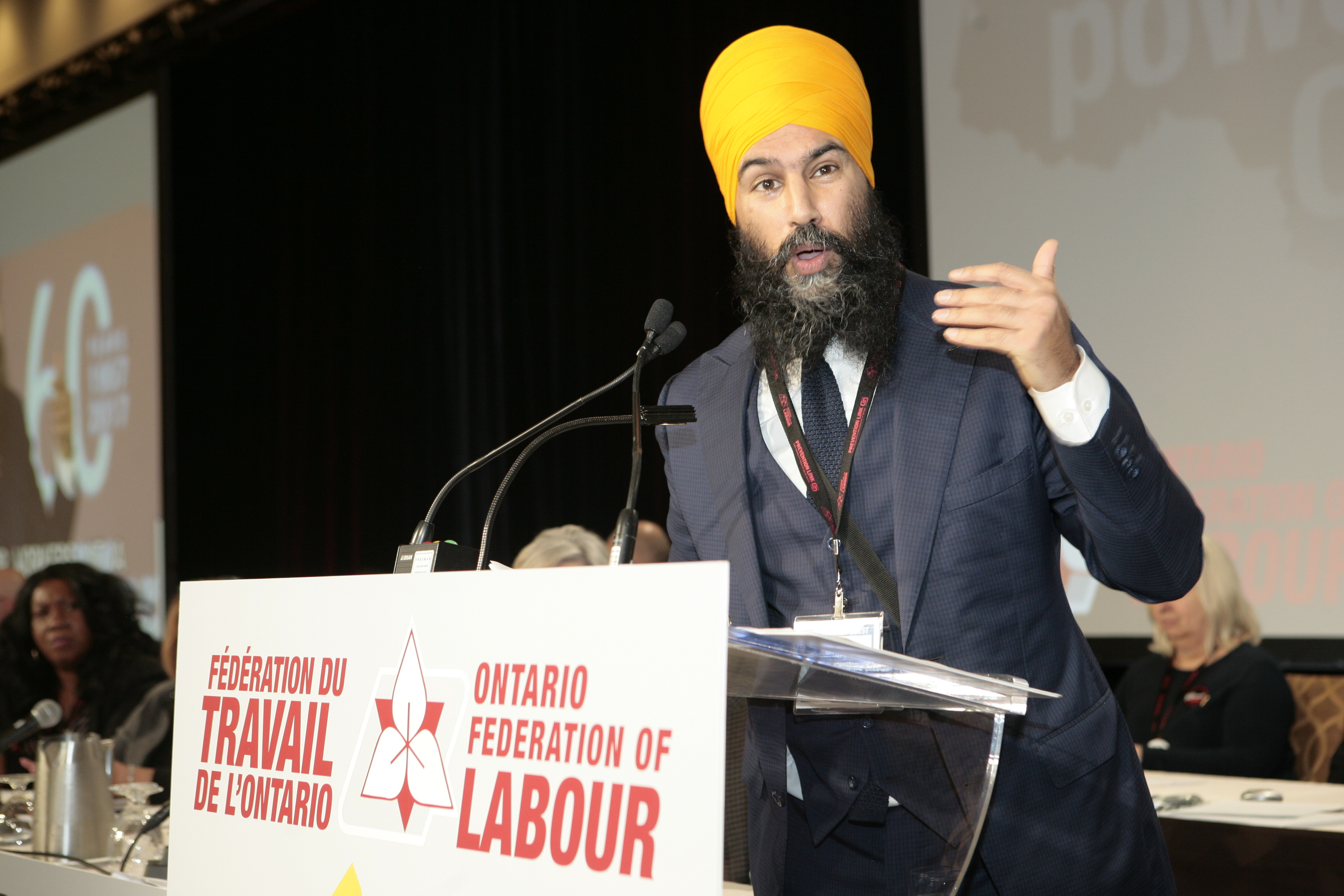
Singh speaks at an Ontario Federation of Labour convention several weeks after winning the New Democratic Party leadership election

Singh initially opted to lead the NDP from outside of Parliament. He indicated that he preferred to run in a seat where he feels a "genuine connection" rather than any "safe" seat. Singh had stated that he would most likely run in Brampton East, which includes the bulk of his old provincial riding, in the 2019 election. Soon after his election as leader, Singh named leadership rival Guy Caron as parliamentary leader of the NDP.

In a December 2017 interview with Bloomberg, Singh explained that he would not rule out working with the Conservatives to topple a federal government led by Trudeau if the NDP held the balance of power in a minority parliament.

In February 2018, Singh suspended Saskatchewan MP Erin Weir from the NDP caucus although no direct complaints had been made against him. Singh had 220 emails sent out to women connected with the NDP, as well as appearing on television soliciting complaints against Weir, which ended up receiving 15 complaints of which 11 were dismissed as trivial. Weir was formally expelled from caucus on May 3, 2018, based upon the outcome of the sexual harassment investigation which stated Weir's conduct was described by an investigator as “on the low-end of the scale,” and which would not normally be understood as “sexual harassment.” It was alleged he argued excessively over carbon levies with a staffer of then party leader Tom Mulcair's during a NDP convention and also he stood too close when speaking to people. In May 2018, a group of 67 former NDP MPs and MLAs from Saskatchewan sent Singh a letter in support of Weir and calling for his reinstatement as an NDP MP. On September 6, 2018, Singh rejected Weir's request to rejoin the NDP during a meeting in June, despite Weir stating that he had worked with a personal trainer to understand the issues of the complaint.

==== 2019 Burnaby South by-election ====
On August 8, 2018, Singh announced he would be running in a by-election to replace Kennedy Stewart as the Member of Parliament for Burnaby South. Stewart had resigned in order to make an ultimately successful bid for Mayor of Vancouver. Singh relocated to Burnaby for the election and won on February 25, 2019, with 38.9 percent of the vote.

=== 2019 federal election ===
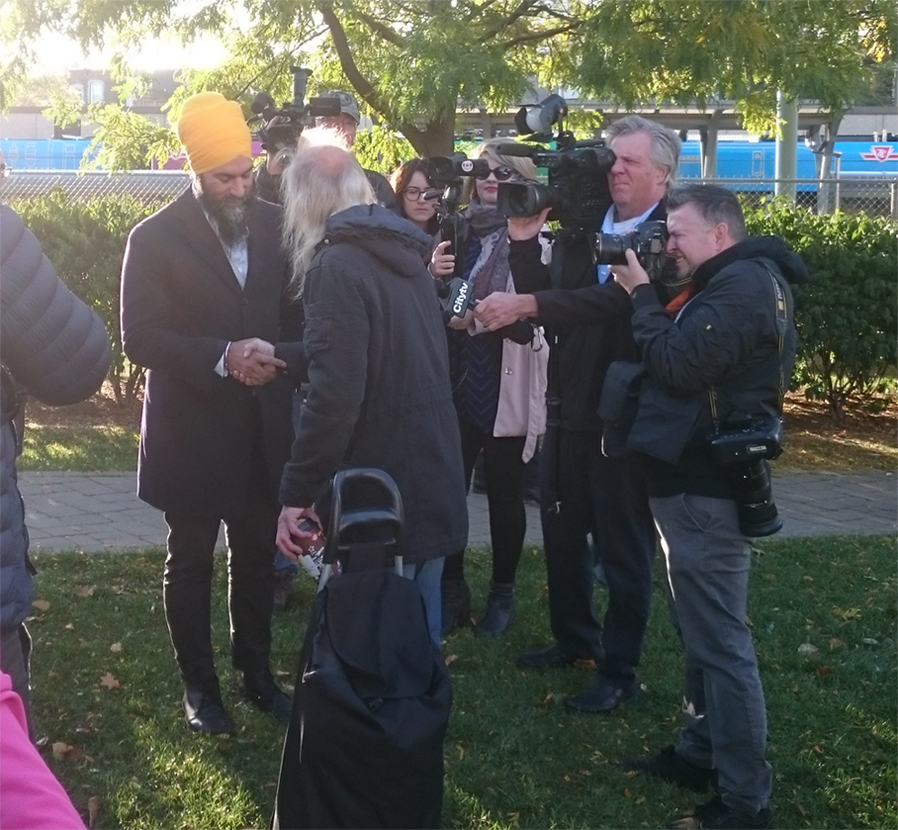
Singh during a campaign stop at the Broadview subway station in Toronto on October 15, 2019

The NDP entered the campaign for the 2019 federal election with polling that suggested it was at risk of losing official party status, and even possibly being eclipsed by the Green Party, having already lost the riding of Nanaimo—Ladysmith to Green candidate Paul Manly in a by-election. This followed a by-election loss to the Liberals in Mulcair's vacated seat of Outremont, with most polls showing the NDP was vulnerable to a wipe out in Quebec. The NDP also saw low fundraising numbers during his tenure.

Singh was widely credited to have performed well in the English language debate on October 7, improving the poll numbers for both himself and his party. This followed positive coverage of his campaign, especially with regard to his handling of racial issues, when compared to the other party leaders.

On October 21, 2019, Singh was re-elected to the Burnaby South riding. The NDP won 24 seats, down from 44 seats at the 2015 election. However, the incumbent Trudeau Liberal government failed to retain its majority, allowing the NDP to share the balance of power in Parliament. It was the lowest seat count for the NDP since 2004, and the party was passed by the Bloc Québécois as the third-largest parliamentary party. The NDP lost all but one of its seats in Quebec, where it was suggested that Singh's Sikhism may have been negatively received by voters in the context of the Quebec ban on religious symbols.

During the election a man in Montreal, Quebec, told Singh to cut off his turban to look more Canadian during a campaign stop. Singh replied that Canadians "look like all sorts of people" before walking off.

=== 43rd Canadian Parliament ===
On June 17, 2020, Singh was removed from the House of Commons for the rest of the day after he called Bloc Québécois MP Alain Therrien a "racist" and refused to apologize when Therrien was the sole member to prevent unanimous consent on the second motion concluding systemic racism and discrimination in the Royal Canadian Mounted Police (RCMP) prior to the completion of the public inquiry from Singh's first motion.

=== 2021 federal election ===
In August 2021, Singh announced a plan to enforce mandatory COVID-19 vaccination for employees that work under a collective bargaining contract. Singh made it a campaign promise that "All collective agreements include a process for progressive discipline − up to and including termination. Discipline should always be a last resort, but may be necessary in rare cases to protect the health and safety of Canadians." On September 5 he returned to the subject in a press conference with the NDP candidate for the riding of Ottawa-Centre. Here he laid out his promise to "[supply] $1 billion in targeted vaccination programs," as well as to create "a national vaccine passport system", to extend pandemic supports, and to strengthen "laws to protect health care workers and those seeking care from harassment and attacks." He attracted support from other party leaders including Justin Trudeau and Erin O'Toole.

=== 44th Canadian Parliament ===
Singh was re-elected with a comfortable majority of slightly more than 4,000 votes to serve in Burnaby-South. The 44th Canadian Parliament made very few changes to its predecessor, and the NDP emerged with its total number of seats almost unchanged at 25.

On March 22, 2022, the NDP struck a confidence and supply agreement with the governing Liberal Party of Canada over certain priorities: the government would “by the end of 2023” implement pharmacare and a "dental care program for low-income Canadians" would be a government priority to be enacted by 2025. The pact was influenced when the Freedom Convoy caused Trudeau to invoke and revoke the Emergencies Act over the vaccine mandate policy then in effect and also by the 2022 Russian invasion of Ukraine. Amidst the Gaza war, Singh called for the end of arm sales to Israel, and called for the recognition of the State of Palestine. He stated that he considered stepping down as NDP leader in 2023, after he was informed of threats to his life. It was later reported that an agent allegedly connected to the Indian government had been closely tracking Singh, leading the Royal Canadian Mounted Police (RCMP) to place Singh and his family under police protection in late 2023. During the party's national convention in Hamilton, Ontario, Singh passed his leadership review with 81% support.

The Conservatives accused Singh in attack ads of keeping the Trudeau government in power to secure his parliamentary pension, which he qualified for in 2025, shortly before the federal election.

On September 4, 2024, Singh announced that he was ending the 2022 confidence-and-supply agreement, citing discontent with the Liberals' performance on healthcare reforms and affordability measures. Later in the month the NDP faced two competitive federal by-elections in Elmwood—Transcona in Winnipeg and LaSalle—Émard—Verdun in Montreal, winning the former and significantly improving their vote share in the latter. Additionally, in May 2025, the Alberta NDP voted to end automatic joint membership with the federal NDP, giving provincial members the option to opt out of federal membership.

=== 2025 federal election ===
While Singh's NDP stagnated in most opinion polls following the 2021 federal election, the party experienced a brief jump in support to second place following the collapse of the governing Liberal party, during the 2024–2025 political crisis. However, following Trudeau's resignation in January and Mark Carney's election as Liberal leader, the NDP collapsed in most polls, with most of its support going to the Liberals. Despite being criticized for his political decisions, he defended his move to support the Liberal government during the 44th Parliament in an interview with the Toronto Star, saying that he "could not stomach the idea" of a Conservative government. On election night, having been defeated in Burnaby Central and with the NDP losing official party status, Singh announced that he would step down as party leader once an interim leader was chosen in advance of the 2026 leadership election.

== Political positions ==
On the occasion of the launch of his leadership bid in 2017, Singh branded himself a progressive and a social democrat.

=== Drug policy ===
Singh supports decriminalizing the purchase, possession and consumption of psychoactive drugs for personal use as has been the case in Portugal since 2001.

=== Economic policy ===
Singh's economic policy states that "millions of Canadians are living in poverty". Singh supports a progressive tax system and supports eliminating several tax deductions available to the highest-income earners and redirect the money to low-income seniors, workers and disabled Canadians. Singh's tax agenda during the 2017 New Democratic Party leadership election included creating new tax brackets for the highest-income earners and raising corporate tax.

Singh supports a $20/hour minimum wage, the imposition of Canadian sales taxes on paid on-demand internet video providers (also referred to as a "Netflix tax"), and a universal pharmacare system, stating "universal healthcare is essential when we talk about equality for all Canadians". The NDP have stated that closing tax loopholes on the ultra rich would fund a universal pharmacare program. After the 2018 federal budget was released, Singh criticized the Liberals' plan for research into pharmacare with no funding behind it, calling it "not a plan but a fantasy".

In January 2019, Singh promised to incentivize the building of 500,000 units of affordable housing by removing the federal tax burden on new affordable housing projects.

=== Energy policy ===
Singh favours reducing Canada's carbon emissions to 30 percent of 2005 levels by 2025. This would be done by assisting provinces with the 2030 "coal phaseout", implementing a zero emissions vehicle agenda, "greening" the tax system by adding subsidies to companies supporting ecology and building a renewable energy super grid. Singh also supports creating more accountability in climate change policy by creating an independent officer of parliament mandated to report on interim progress on emission reductions (Climate Change Action Officer or CCAO), tasking the Commissioner of Environment and Sustainable Development (CESD) to the Auditor General with gathering data from each province and territory and appointing an advisory group composed of regional and topic-specific experts who will support the CCAO in interpreting data presented by the CESD and assessing implications for climate, energy, and economic policies and regulations. Singh's opposition to the Trans Mountain Pipeline expansion project was repeatedly condemned by Alberta NDP leader and former Premier of Alberta Rachel Notley.

=== Foreign policy ===
Singh criticized Israel's actions during the Gaza war in Gaza. In May 2024, he posted a tweet after images of the Tel al-Sultan attack went viral: "Images of the IDFs [sic] airstrike hitting a camp for displaced Palestinians in Rafah are horrifying. Images so terrible I won’t share them. The world is failing the people of Gaza. Canada is failing the people of Gaza."

==== Sikh matters and relations with India ====
In a 2011 interview with Jus Reign, then-federal candidate Singh gave as one of his reasons for entering politics as being to oppose recent comments made by the former premier of British Columbia and federal cabinet minister, Ujjal Dosanjh, himself a Sikh. Dosanjh had recently stated that Sikh extremism was on the rise in Canada and was being abetted by political correctness in the name of diversity.

Singh "spent much of his early political career as an MP [sic] in Ontario lobbying the province to recognize India's 1984 anti-Sikh riots as an act of genocide". (Note: Singh was actually a Member of Provincial Parliament (MPP) of Ontario in his early political career; he later became a Member of Parliament (MP).) In 2016, he introduced a motion into the Ontario legislature recognizing the riots as a genocide; the motion failed but a similar motion introduced by Liberal MPP Harinder Malhi in 2017 succeeded in passing. In 2018, Singh called on the federal government to do likewise.

In 2013, Singh was denied a visa to India for raising the issue of the anti-Sikh riots. He was reportedly the first Western legislator ever to be denied entry to India. In early 2018, Singh was again denied a visa by the Indian government. He had also reportedly appeared "at various events where others promoted Sikh independence" in the form of the Khalistan movement.

In an October 2017 interview with CBC News, Singh expressed doubts on the findings of the 18-month long inquiry led by former Supreme Court justice John Major into the bombing of Air India Flight 182, which pointed to Talwinder Singh Parmar as the chief terrorist behind the bombing. In this interview, Singh was unwilling to denounce extremists within Canadian Sikhs who pay homage to Parmar as a martyr. In a subsequent interview with CBC on March 18, 2018, Singh reversed his position.

Following the killing of Canadian Sikh activist Hardeep Singh Nijjar in 2023, Singh supported the Canadian government's declaration that Indian government agents had been involved in the killing and stated that it represented "a serious breach of the sovereignty of Canada". In 2024, following Canada's expulsion of Indian diplomats in relation to Nijjar's death, he called on the federal government to "implement severe sanctions on Indian diplomats and banish the RSS, a violent, militant, terrorist organization from India".

=== Environmental policy ===
On May 31, 2019, Singh promised that the NDP would build charging stations for electric vehicles at federal buildings and Canada Post locations and offer residents a $600 grant to help pay for home charging stations.

Singh initially supported Kitimat's LNG Canada facility supplied by the Coastal GasLink Pipeline in British Columbia that would impact native burial grounds and override unceded lands such as the Wetʼsuwetʼen. After the NDP lost Nanaimo in a May 2019 by-election to the Green Party, Singh quickly changed his position to oppose the LNG natural gas facility. Singh also began opposing fracking following the lost by-election.

=== Quebec policy ===
During the Lac-St. Jean by-election campaign which concluded in October 2017, he said he supports Quebec's right of self-determination and agrees with the NDP's 2005 Sherbrooke Declaration, which states, in opposition to the Clarity Act, that Canada should recognize any independence referendum won by Quebec sovereigntists.

During the 2019 federal election campaign it was noted that Singh opposed Bill 21 on religious symbols, but also said, "I don't know exactly" if Bill 21 was racist, and that there should be no political interference in the existing court challenges of the law.

=== Republicanism ===
Singh has argued Canada should be a republic and that he does not see the relevance of the monarchy in the 21st century.

=== Social issues ===
Recounting a personal experience where he was the subject of racial profiling, Singh has strongly supported legislation for a federal ban on carding, calling the practice a form of systemic racism.

When asked at NDP leadership debate in Saskatoon if he would bring back the long-gun registry Singh responded: "It's a difficult question, absolutely. I know that's why it is asked... I also think it's important that we acknowledge regional differences, the fact that there is a different culture between the way things are treated in different regions." Singh has urged Justin Trudeau and the Liberal Party to allow cities to ban handguns.

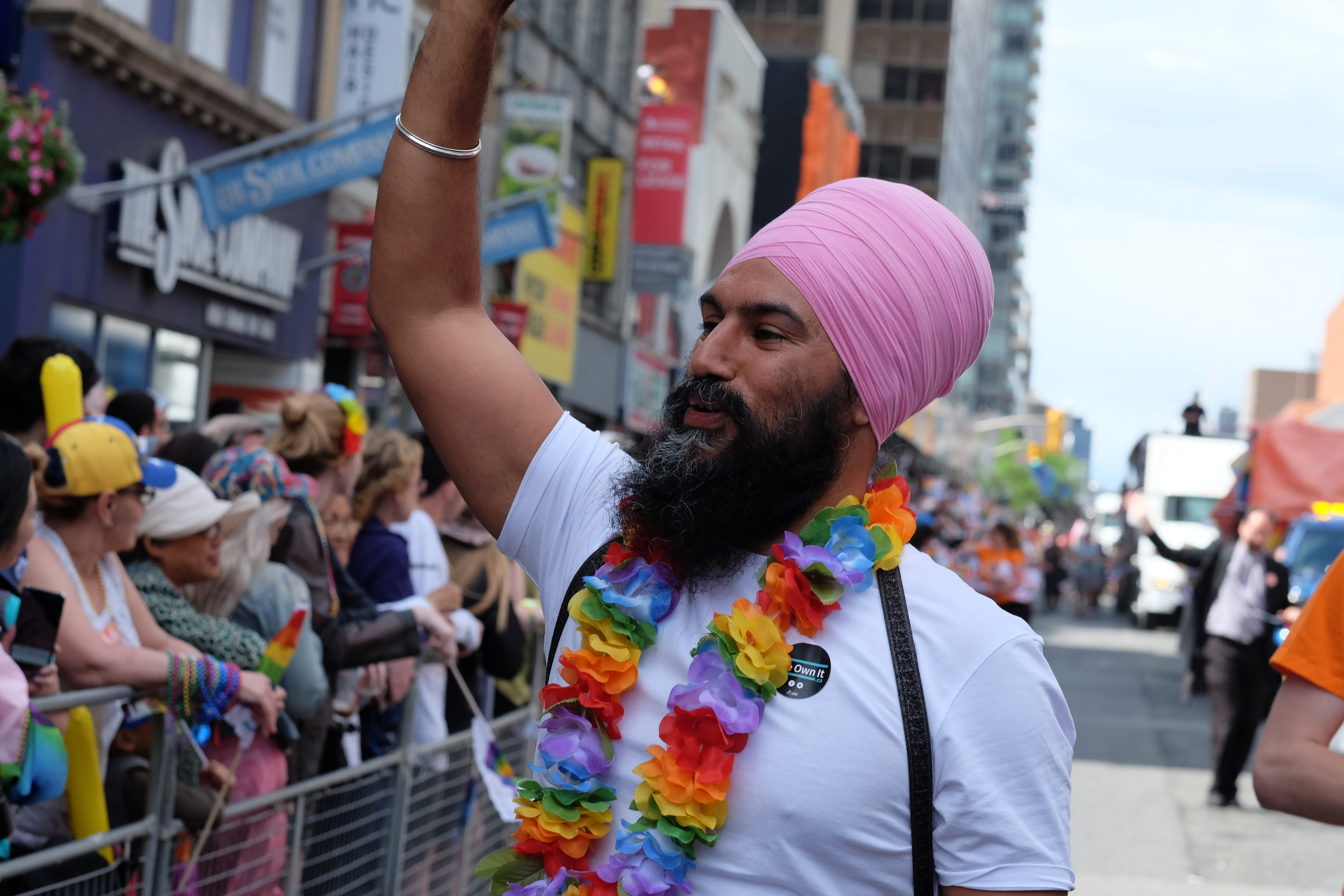
Singh at the Toronto Pride Parade in 2017

In March 2015, during the Ontario sex education curriculum controversy, Singh spoke out against changes to the curriculum which included proposed updating on teaching on sexual orientation and gender identity. Singh believes in training the RCMP in "LGBTQIA2S+ competency training" to ensure interactions with law enforcement are not stigmatizing or traumatizing. Singh also supports bringing a form of affirmative action for hiring of LGBTQ people and supports more inclusive shelter and transitional housing spaces in service of LGBTQ youth.

Singh advocates for Health Canada conducting research on the health care needs and experiences of LGBTQ patients and advocates for policy changes allowing people to self-declare their gender. Singh also supports immediately repealing the de facto ban on blood, tissue and organ donation by men who have sex with men and trans women who have sex with men.

== Personal life ==
Singh practises Brazilian jiu-jitsu.

Singh is a practicing Sikh and was recognized by the World Sikh Organization of Canada in their 2012 list of honourees for being the first turbaned Sikh MPP in Ontario.

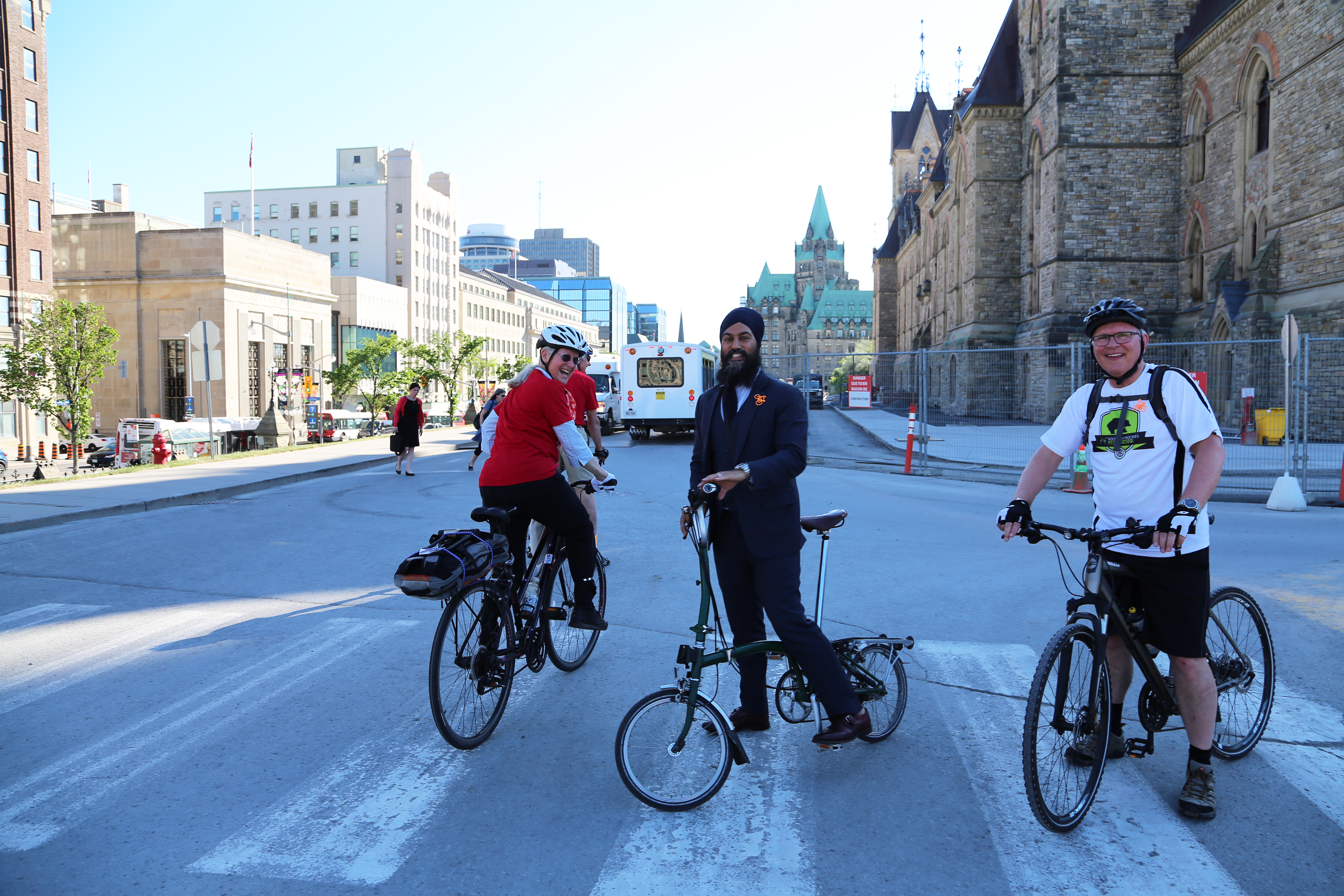
Singh riding a bike at the National Bike Summit in Ottawa in 2018

In a November 2017 episode of the TVOntario series Political Blind Date, Singh was paired with former Toronto City Councillor and then-future Premier of Ontario Doug Ford. The pair explored different forms of transportation, with Singh taking Ford on a downtown Toronto bicycle ride while Ford drove Singh along the dedicated streetcar right-of-way on St. Clair Avenue. Ford said of the experience that the two became friends, and Singh said Ford was "very warm and friendly". Jagmeet Singh is an avid cyclist and owns six designer bicycles.

In January 2018, Singh became engaged to Gurkiran Kaur Sidhu, a fashion designer and co-founder of Jangiiro, a Punjabi clothing line. He proposed to her at the vegetarian restaurant where they had their first date, in front of friends, family, and members of the media that Singh had invited. The pair married on February 22, 2018. In August 2021, they announced that they were expecting a child, a daughter named Anhad, born in January 2022. In July 2023, they announced that they were expecting a second child, a daughter born in December 2023.

On April 26, 2025, Singh attended the Lapu-Lapu Day Block Party, which is an event honouring Filipino heritage, in Vancouver. He left minutes before a vehicle-ramming attack occurred at the event. He said, "I just want the Filipino community to know that we stand with you."

In June 2025, Singh attended the Toronto stop of the Grand National Tour at the Rogers Centre, featuring American rapper Kendrick Lamar, who had engaged in a public feud with Canadian rapper Drake in 2024, and American singer SZA. Drake publicly criticized Singh's attendance at the concert, and Singh apologized the next day on Instagram.

Singh is fluent in English, French, and Punjabi.

== Electoral record ==
=== Summary ===
Electoral history of Jagmeet Singh — Federal general elections
Year	Party	Votes			Seats		Position
Year	Party	Total	%	±%	Total	±	Position
2019	New Democratic	2,903,722	15.98%	−3.78%	24 / 338	−20	Fourth party
2021	New Democratic	3,036,348	17.82%	+1.84%	25 / 338	+1	Fourth party
2025	New Democratic	1,234,674	6.3%	−11.5%	7 / 343	−18	No status

Electoral history of Jagmeet Singh — Provincial and federal constituency elections
Year	Type	Riding	Party	Votes for Singh				Result	Swing
Year	Type	Riding	Party	Total	%	P.	±%	Result	Swing
2011	Federal general	Bramalea—Gore—Malton	New Democratic	19,368	33.51%	2nd	+21.49	Lost	Gain
2011	Ontario general	Bramalea—Gore—Malton	New Democratic	16,626	37.64%	1st	+25.82	Elected	Gain
2014	Ontario general	Bramalea—Gore—Malton	New Democratic	23,519	44.32%	1st	+6.68	Elected	Hold
2019	Federal by-election	Burnaby South	New Democratic	8,848	38.90%	1st	+3.83	Elected	Hold
2019	Federal general	Burnaby South	New Democratic	16,956	37.67%	1st	−1.42	Elected	Hold
2021	Federal general	Burnaby South	New Democratic	16,382	40.34%	1st	+2.67	Elected	Hold
2025	Federal general	Burnaby Central	New Democratic	9,353	18.16%	3rd	−21.62	Lost	Gain

=== Federal elections ===
==== Burnaby Central ====
2025 Canadian federal election: Burnaby Central
Party	Candidate	Votes	%	±%	Expenditures
Liberal	Wade Chang	21,745	42.23	+10.98	$75,752.57
Conservative	James Yan	19,889	38.62	+16.47	$122,829.34
New Democratic	Jagmeet Singh	9,353	18.16	–21.62	$129,759.41
People's	Richard Farbridge	506	0.98	–2.40	$585.48
Total valid votes/expense limit		51,493	99.17	–	$129,924.64
Total rejected ballots		430	0.83	–	
Turnout		51,923	61.27	–	
Eligible voters		84,744			
Liberal notional gain from New Democratic		Swing		+16.30	
Source: Elections Canada

==== Burnaby South ====
2021 Canadian federal election: Burnaby South
Party	Candidate	Votes	%	±%	Expenditures
New Democratic	Jagmeet Singh	16,382	40.34	+2.67	$81,111.34
Liberal	Brea Huang Sami	12,361	30.44	+6.65	$97,095.22
Conservative	Likky Lavji	9,104	22.42	–8.50	$42,968.01
People's	Marcella Williams	1,290	3.18	+1.74	$5,043.08
Green	Maureen Curran	1,175	2.89	–2.61	$839.33
Independent	Martin Kendell	296	0.73	–	none listed
Total valid votes/expense limit		40,608	99.29	–	$110,662.02
Total rejected ballots		291	0.71	–0.21	
Turnout		40,899	51.07	–5.49	
Eligible voters		80,092			
New Democratic hold		Swing		–1.99	
Source: Elections Canada

2019 Canadian federal election: Burnaby South
Party	Candidate	Votes	%	±%	Expenditures
New Democratic	Jagmeet Singh	16,956	37.68	–1.19	$94,274.04
Conservative	Jay Shin	13,914	30.92	+8.31	$101,861.19
Liberal	Neelam Brar	10,706	23.79	–2.21	$96,784.07
Green	Brennan Wauters	2,477	5.50	–	$901.27
People's	Al Rawdah	645	1.43	–9.21	none listed
Libertarian	Rex Brocki	246	0.55	–	none listed
Marxist–Leninist	Brian Sproule	62	0.14	–	none listed
Total valid votes/expense limit		45,006	99.08	–	$107,366.92
Total rejected ballots		417	0.92	+0.09	
Turnout		45,423	56.56	+26.59	
Eligible voters		80,312			
New Democratic hold		Swing		–1.70	
Source: Elections Canada

Canadian federal by-election, February 25, 2019: Burnaby South Resignation of Kennedy Stewart
Party	Candidate	Votes	%	±%	Expenditures
New Democratic	Jagmeet Singh	8,848	38.86	+3.79	$107,876.69
Liberal	Richard Lee	5,919	26.00	–7.88	$120,398.75
Conservative	Jay Shin	5,147	22.61	–4.51	$124,688.15
People's	Laura-Lynn Tyler Thompson	2,422	10.64	–	$87,790.22
Independent	Terry Grimwood	242	1.06	–	$5,983.61
Independent	Valentine Wu	190	0.84	–	$704.17
Total valid votes/expense limit		22,768	99.17	–	$132,377.49
Total rejected ballots		190	0.83	+0.23	
Turnout		22,958	29.96	–30.82	
Eligible voters		76,618			
New Democratic hold		Swing		+5.84	
Source: Elections Canada

==== Bramalea—Gore—Malton ====
2011 Canadian federal election: Bramalea—Gore—Malton
Party	Candidate	Votes	%	±%	Expenditures
Conservative	Bal Gosal	19,907	34.44	−2.68	–
New Democratic	Jagmeet Singh	19,368	33.51	+24.49	–
Liberal	Gurbax Singh Malhi	16,402	29.40	−15.65	–
Green	John Moulton	1,748	3.02	−2.14	–
Marxist–Leninist	Frank Chilelli	371	0.64	+0.02	
Total valid votes		57,796	100.00	–	
Total rejected ballots		454	0.80	+0.18	
Turnout		58,250	54.75	+5.01	–
Eligible voters		106,395	–	–	

=== Provincial elections ===
2014 Ontario general election: Bramalea—Gore—Malton
Party	Candidate	Votes	%	±%
New Democratic	Jagmeet Singh	23,519	44.32	+6.16
Liberal	Kuldip Kular	17,873	33.68	+0.75
Progressive Conservative	Harjit Jaswal	9,403	17.72	–4.99
Green	Pauline Thornham	2,277	4.29	+1.79
Total valid votes		53,072	98.60	
Total rejected, unmarked and declined ballots		753	1.40	+0.67
Turnout		53,825	45.03	+4.32
Eligible voters		119,534		
New Democratic hold		Swing		+2.71
Source: Elections Ontario

2011 Ontario general election: Bramalea—Gore—Malton
Party	Candidate	Votes	%	±%
New Democratic	Jagmeet Singh	16,626	38.16	+25.82
Liberal	Kuldip Kular	14,349	32.93	–14.07
Progressive Conservative	Sanjeev Maingi	9,896	22.71	–6.65
Green	Pauline Thornham	1,091	2.50	–7.63
Libertarian	Joy Lee	738	1.69	–
Independent	Archie McLachlan	491	1.13	–
Family Coalition	Linda O'Marra	381	0.87	–0.28
Total valid votes		43,572	99.27	
Total rejected, unmarked and declined ballots		321	0.73	–0.34
Turnout		43,893	40.71	–2.95
Eligible voters		107,820		
New Democratic gain from Liberal		Swing		+19.95
Source: Elections Ontario

=== Leadership elections ===
2017 New Democratic Party leadership election
Candidate	Ballot 1	
Jagmeet Singh	35,266	53.8%
Charlie Angus	12,705	19.4%
Niki Ashton	11,374	17.4%
Guy Caron	6,164	9.4%
Total	65,782	100%

== Published works ==
- Singh, Jagmeet (April 23, 2019). Love & Courage: My Story of Family, Resilience, and Overcoming the Unexpected: A Memoir. Toronto: Simon & Schuster. ISBN 978-1-9821-0539-6. OCLC 1078885943.
