= Simon Chandler (politician) =

Canadian politician

Simon Chandler MLA

Member of the British Columbia Legislative Assembly for Burnaby North
- Incumbent
- Assumed office October 24, 2026
- Preceded by: Janet Routledge

Personal details
- Party: BC Conservative
- Education: Trinity Western University (BBA); Laurentian Leadership Centre

Simon Chandler MLA is a Canadian politician and accountant who has served as a member of the Legislative Assembly of British Columbia (MLA) representing the electoral district of Burnaby North since 2026. A member of the Conservative Party, he previously ran unsuccessfully as the parties candidate in Burnaby East during there 2024 general election.

== Early career and education ==
Chandler grew up in Burnaby Heights, British Columbia. After graduating high school, he went on to gain a Bachelor of Business Administration (BBA) from Trinity Western University. He later attended the Laurentian Leadership Centre studying good governance.

Chandler served two years in the army reserves as an infantry soldier.

== Political career ==
Chandler ran as the Conservative candidate in Burnaby East during the 2024 general election He was defeated by NDP candidate Rohini Arora.

During the 2026 general election, Chandler was nominated to run in Burnaby North. He defeated incumbent NDP MLA Janet Routledge.

== Personal life ==
Chandler lives in the Brentwood area of Burnaby.

== Electoral history ==
2026 British Columbia general election: Burnaby North
Party	Candidate	Votes	%	±%	Expenditures
Conservative	Simon Chandler	8,257	46.35	+3.35	
New Democratic	Janet Routledge	7,478	41.97	-11.29	
Green	Maddy Kennedy-Parrott	1,618	9.08	-	
OneBC	Jenny Yamagata	413	2.32	-	
Total valid votes		17,766	99.72		
Total rejected ballots		50	0.28		
Turnout					
Registered voters					
Conservative gain from New Democratic		Swing		+7.32	
Source: Elections BC

2024 British Columbia general election: Burnaby East
Party	Candidate	Votes	%	±%	Expenditures
New Democratic	Rohini Arora	10,490	51.85	−7.3	$47,116.87
Conservative	Simon Chandler	8,198	40.52	–	$17,963.73
Green	Tara Shushtarian	1,544	7.63	−5.5	$4,987.99
Total valid votes/expense limit		20,232	99.80	–	$71,700.08
Total rejected ballots		41	0.20	–	
Turnout		20,273	54.95	–	
Registered voters		36,896			
New Democratic notional hold		Swing		−23.9	
Source: Elections BC
