= Burnaby East =

Provincial electoral district in British Columbia, Canada

British Columbia electoral district
- Location in Burnaby

Provincial electoral district
- Legislature: Legislative Assembly of British Columbia
MLA
Rohini Arora
New Democratic
- District created: 2008
- First contested: 2009
- Last contested: 2026

Demographics
- Population (2006): 48,884
- Area (km²): 36.91
- Pop. density (per km²): 1,324.4
- Census division: Metro Vancouver
- Census subdivision: Burnaby

Burnaby East is a provincial electoral district in British Columbia, Canada.

The district was established under the name Burnaby-Lougheed by the Electoral Districts Act, 2008. It was first contested in the 2009 general election in which Liberal, Harry Bloy was elected MLA. Under the 2021 British Columbia electoral redistribution which took effect for the 2024 general election, the electoral district had minor boundary changes and adopted its current name.

== Members of the Legislative Assembly ==
Assembly	Years	Member	Party
Burnaby-Lougheed; Riding created from Burnaby-Edmonds, Burnaby North and Burquitlam
39th	2009–2013	Harry Bloy	Liberal
40th	2013–2017	Jane Shin	New Democratic
41st	2017–2020	Katrina Chen	New Democratic
42nd	2020–2024	Katrina Chen	New Democratic
Burnaby East
43rd	2024–2026	Rohini Arora	New Democratic
44th	2026–present	Rohini Arora	New Democratic

== Election results ==
2026 British Columbia general election
Party	Candidate	Votes	%	±%	Expenditures
New Democratic	Rohini Arora	7,759	44.31	-7.54	
Conservative	Peter Si	7,518	42.94	+2.42	
Green	Javad Shushtarian	1,672	9.55	+1.92	
OneBC	De Ding	523	2.99	-	
Total valid votes		17,472	99.79		
Total rejected ballots		37	0.21		
Turnout					
Registered voters					
New Democratic hold		Swing		-4.98	
Source: Elections BC

2024 British Columbia general election
Party	Candidate	Votes	%	±%	Expenditures
New Democratic	Rohini Arora	10,490	51.85	−7.3	$47,116.87
Conservative	Simon Chandler	8,198	40.52	–	$17,963.73
Green	Tara Shushtarian	1,544	7.63	−5.5	$4,987.99
Total valid votes/expense limit		20,232	99.80	–	$71,700.08
Total rejected ballots		41	0.20	–	
Turnout		20,273	54.95	–	
Registered voters		36,896			
New Democratic notional hold		Swing		−23.9	
Source: Elections BC

2020 provincial election redistributed results
Party	%
New Democratic	59.1
Liberal	26.4
Green	13.1

2020 British Columbia general election: Burnaby-Lougheed
Party	Candidate	Votes	%	±%	Expenditures
New Democratic	Katrina Chen	12,574	60.25	+12.19	$45,187.71
Liberal	Tariq Malik	5,386	25.81	−11.15	$32,865.72
Green	Andrew Williamson	2,628	12.59	−1.18	$5,054.75
Libertarian	Dominique Paynter	281	1.35	+0.78	$0.00
Total valid votes		20,869	100.00	–	
Total rejected ballots					
Turnout					
Registered voters					
Source: Elections BC

2017 British Columbia general election: Burnaby-Lougheed
Party	Candidate	Votes	%	±%	Expenditures
New Democratic	Katrina Chen	10,911	48.06	+3.80	$74,356.10
Liberal	Steve Darling	8,391	36.96	−3.63	$71,973.42
Green	Joe Keithley	3,127	13.77	+5.54	$8,745.26
Independent	Sylvia Gung	145	0.64	–	$87.90
Libertarian	Neeraj Murarka	129	0.57	–	$329.94
Total valid votes		22,703	100.00	–	
Total rejected ballots		188	0.82	−0.29	
Turnout		22,891	60.81	+4.57	
Registered voters		37,641			
Source: Elections BC

2013 British Columbia general election: Burnaby-Lougheed
Party	Candidate	Votes	%	±%	Expenditures
New Democratic	Jane Shin	8,952	44.26	−0.53	$106,921
Liberal	Ken Kramer	8,209	40.59	−7.86	$78,265
Green	Darwin Augustus Ivan Burns	1,665	8.23	+1.47	$376
No Affiliation	Christine N. Clarke	1,399	6.92	–	$260
Total valid votes		20,225	100.00	–	
Total rejected ballots		227	1.11	+0.43	
Turnout		20,452	56.24	+2.65	
Registered voters		36,366			
Source: Elections BC

2009 British Columbia general election: Burnaby-Lougheed
Party	Candidate	Votes	%	Expenditures
Liberal	Harry Bloy	9,207	48.45	$130,336
New Democratic	Jaynie Clark	8,511	44.79	$82,016
Green	Helen H. S. Chang	1,285	6.76	$8,537
Total valid votes		19,003	100	
Total rejected ballots		131	0.68	
Turnout		19,134	53.59	
Registered voters		35,705		

== See also ==
- List of British Columbia provincial electoral districts
- Canadian provincial electoral districts
