= Bramalea—Gore—Malton (provincial electoral district) =

Former provincial electoral district in Ontario, Canada

Ontario electoral district
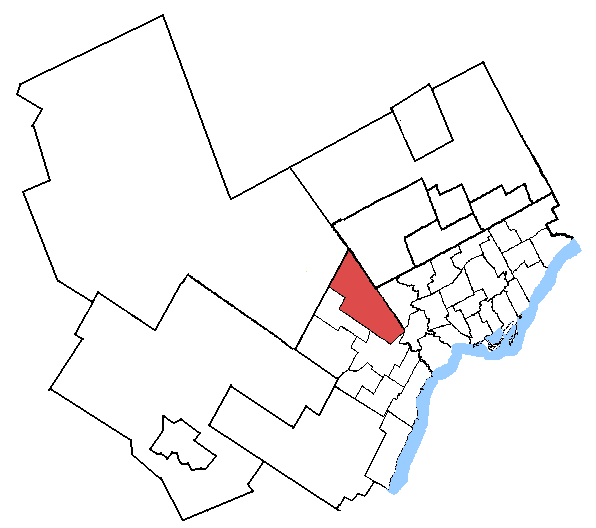
- Bramalea—Gore—Malton in relation to other Greater Toronto Area electoral districts
- Coordinates: 43°43′13″N 79°41′14″W; Location of the constituency office in Brampton (as of 3 September 2010)

Defunct provincial electoral district
- Legislature: Legislative Assembly of Ontario
- District created: 2004
- District abolished: 2018
- First contested: 2007
- Last contested: 2014

Demographics
- Population (2006): 152,698
- Electors (2007): 92,728
- Area (km²): 151
- Census division: Peel
- Census subdivision(s): Mississauga, Brampton

Bramalea—Gore—Malton was a provincial electoral district in Southern Ontario, Canada. It was created for the 2007 provincial election. All of the district was carved from Bramalea—Gore—Malton—Springdale.

The riding includes the part of Mississauga north of the 401 and east of Dixie Road and the part of Brampton east of a line following Dixie Road to Bovaird Drive to Torbram Road.

In 2018, the district was dissolved into Brampton East, Mississauga—Malton, Brampton Centre, and Brampton North.

The riding has the unusual distinction of only ever having been held by members of Canada's Sikh minority.

== Members of Provincial Parliament ==
Bramalea—Gore—Malton
Assembly	Years	Member	Party
Riding created from Bramalea—Gore—Malton—Springdale
39th	2007–2011	Kuldip Kular	Liberal
40th	2011–2014	Jagmeet Singh	New Democratic
41st	2014–2017	Jagmeet Singh	New Democratic
41st	2017–2018	Vacant	Vacant
Riding dissolved into Brampton East, Mississauga—Malton, Brampton Centre, and Brampton North

== Election results ==
2014 Ontario general election
Party	Candidate	Votes	%	±%
New Democratic	Jagmeet Singh	23,519	44.32	+6.16
Liberal	Kuldip Kular	17,873	33.68	+0.75
Progressive Conservative	Harjit Jaswal	9,403	17.72	–4.99
Green	Pauline Thornham	2,277	4.29	+1.79
Total valid votes		53,072	98.60	
Total rejected, unmarked and declined ballots		753	1.40	+0.67
Turnout		53,825	45.03	+4.32
Eligible voters		119,534		
New Democratic hold		Swing		+2.71
Source: Elections Ontario

2011 Ontario general election
Party	Candidate	Votes	%	±%
New Democratic	Jagmeet Singh	16,626	38.16	+25.82
Liberal	Kuldip Kular	14,349	32.93	–14.07
Progressive Conservative	Sanjeev Maingi	9,896	22.71	–6.65
Green	Pauline Thornham	1,091	2.50	–7.63
Libertarian	Joy Lee	738	1.69	–
Independent	Archie McLachlan	491	1.13	–
Family Coalition	Linda O'Marra	381	0.87	–0.28
Total valid votes		43,572	99.27	
Total rejected, unmarked and declined ballots		321	0.73	–0.34
Turnout		43,893	40.71	–2.95
Eligible voters		107,820		
New Democratic gain from Liberal		Swing		+19.95
Source: Elections Ontario

2007 Ontario general election
Party	Candidate	Votes	%	
Liberal	Kuldip Kular	19,106	47.00	
Progressive Conservative	Pam Hundal	11,934	29.36	
New Democratic	Glenn Crowe	5,016	12.34	
Green	Bruce Haines	4,120	10.14	
Family Coalition	Gary Nail	471	1.16	
Total valid votes		40,647	98.93	
Total rejected, unmarked and declined ballots		439	1.07	
Turnout		41,086	43.65	
Eligible voters		94,116		
Liberal notional hold		Swing		–
Source: Elections Ontario

== 2007 electoral reform referendum ==
2007 Ontario electoral reform referendum
Side	Votes	%
First Past the Post	23,086	59.9
Mixed member proportional	15,452	40.1
Total valid votes	38,538	100.0
