= Katrina Chen =

Canadian politician (born 1983)

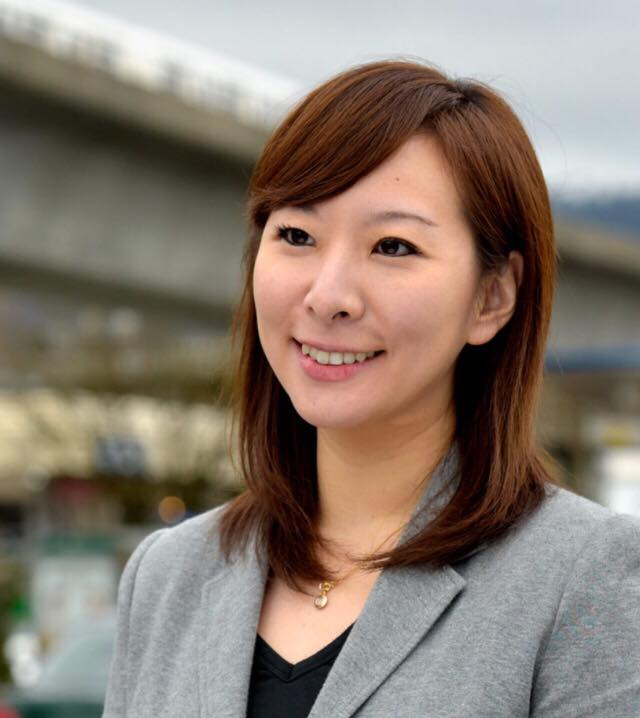

Minister of State for Child Care of British Columbia
- In office July 18, 2017 – December 7, 2022
- Premier: John Horgan
- Preceded by: Stephanie Cadieux (as Minister of Children and Family Development)
- Succeeded by: Grace Lore

Member of the British Columbia Legislative Assembly for Burnaby-Lougheed
- In office May 9, 2017 – September 21, 2024
- Preceded by: Jane Shin
- Succeeded by: Rohini Arora

Personal details
- Born: Chen Wei-Chen; July 14, 1983 (age 43) Taichung, Taiwan
- Party: New Democratic Party

Katrina Wei-Chen Chen (Chinese: 陳葦蓁; born July 14, 1983) is a Canadian politician, author and certified life coach who represented the electoral district of Burnaby-Lougheed in the Legislative Assembly of British Columbia from 2017 to 2024.

In 2025, she published the children's book A Stronger Home. Chen was recognized as one of the Top 25 Canadian Immigrants in 2026.

== Early life and career ==
Chen was raised in Taichung, Taiwan, where her father was a member of the city council. In 2000, when she was 17, Chen immigrated to Canada on her own and completed her education in British Columbia. She earned a bachelor's degree in political science with a minor in history from Simon Fraser University, and also earned a certificate in immigration laws, policies and procedures from the University of British Columbia.

She served as a trustee on the Burnaby Board of Education and worked in both provincial and federal government constituency offices for over 10 years.

== Political career ==
Chen was first elected to the legislature in the 2017 British Columbia general election. After the NDP formed government, Chen was appointed to the cabinet of John Horgan as Minister of State for Child Care.

During her time as a cabinet minister, Chen led the Child Care BC plan to start a new social program in BC – an affordable, quality, inclusive early learning and care system for all families, and successfully negotiated the first Canada-Wide early learning agreement with the federal government with billions of new funding for child care.

Chen was the Chair of the Child Care Working Group and served on many Cabinet committees, including the COVID-19 Working Group, Priorities and Accountability Committee, and Social Initiatives Committee.

As part of an initiative to increase the number of early childhood educators in the province, she has championed dual-credit programs throughout BC which will allow grade 11 and 12 students to earn post secondary credits toward early childhood careers. During her tenure, she led the implementation of dozens of new initiatives to bring down the cost of child care, to support the early childhood education workforce including the new wage enhancement program, and to accelerate the creation of new child care and before and after school care spaces across B.C. communities.

After Horgan announced his retirement as premier and party leader, Chen was suggested by pundits as a possible candidate in the party leadership election. Instead, she endorsed David Eby, doing so before Eby had announced his intentions. After Eby formally announced his leadership bid, Chen joined as co-chair of his campaign, alongside Ravi Kahlon.

After Eby was successful in his leadership bid and sworn in as premier, Chen was speculated to receive a major role in his cabinet. However, Chen declined to join the new cabinet and later announced that she would not seek re-election in 2024, citing the need to address trauma resulting from gender-based violence.

== Current work ==
Her children's book, A Stronger Home, was published by Orca Book Publishers in May 2025 and is dedicated to raising awareness about family violence and healing from a child's perspective. The book was shortlisted for the Christie Harris Illustrated Children's Literature Prize in 2026, along with several other recognitions.

Chen is president of 安信 (AnXin) Community Savings Credit Union, the first credit union initiative dedicated to serving Chinese Canadians and Chinese-language communities in British Columbia. Chen is also an International Coaching Federation certified coach.

== Awards and recognition ==
Chen was recognized as one of the Top 25 Canadian Immigrants in 2026. In 2019, Chen was recognized as one of Taiwan’s Top 10 Outstanding Young Persons (Overseas). She is also a recipient of the King Charles III Coronation Medal.

Her book, A Stronger Home, has also earned several recognitions, including The Sunshine Coast Writers and Editors Society (SCWES) Book Awards for BC Authors

== Electoral record ==
2020 British Columbia general election: Burnaby-Lougheed
Party	Candidate	Votes	%	±%	Expenditures
New Democratic	Katrina Chen	12,574	60.25	+12.19	$45,187.71
Liberal	Tariq Malik	5,386	25.81	−11.15	$32,865.72
Green	Andrew Williamson	2,628	12.59	−1.18	$5,054.75
Libertarian	Dominique Paynter	281	1.35	+0.78	$0.00
Total valid votes		20,869	100.00	–	
Total rejected ballots					
Turnout					
Registered voters					
Source: Elections BC

2017 British Columbia general election: Burnaby-Lougheed
Party	Candidate	Votes	%	±%	Expenditures
New Democratic	Katrina Chen	10,911	48.06	+3.80	$74,356.10
Liberal	Steve Darling	8,391	36.96	−3.63	$71,973.42
Green	Joe Keithley	3,127	13.77	+5.54	$8,745.26
Independent	Sylvia Gung	145	0.64	–	$87.90
Libertarian	Neeraj Murarka	129	0.57	–	$329.94
Total valid votes		22,703	100.00	–	
Total rejected ballots		188	0.82	−0.29	
Turnout		22,891	60.81	+4.57	
Registered voters		37,641			
Source: Elections BC

British Columbia provincial government of John Horgan
Cabinet post (1)
Predecessor	Office	Successor
Ministry Established	Minister of State for Child Care; July 18, 2017 – December 7, 2022	Grace Lore
