= Jane Shin =

Canadian politician

Doctor Jane Shin
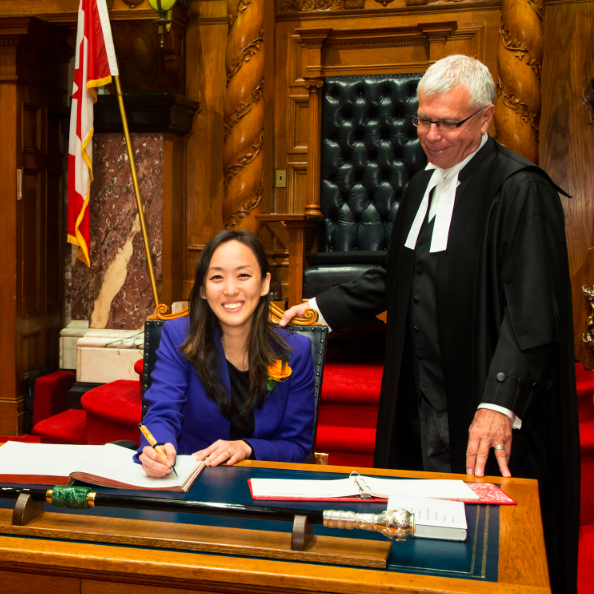

Member of the British Columbia Legislative Assembly for Burnaby-Lougheed
- In office May 14, 2013 – May 9, 2017
- Preceded by: Harry Bloy
- Succeeded by: Katrina Chen

Personal details
- Born: May 7, 1980 (age 46) South Korea
- Party: New Democratic Party
- Profession: Vice-President, Students & Community Development

Korean name
- Hangul: 신재경
- Hanja: 申才炅
- RR: Sin Jaegyeong
- MR: Sin Chaegyŏng

Jane Jae Kyung Shin MD (Korean: 신재경) is a Canadian academic and former politician who was elected to the Legislative Assembly of British Columbia in the 2013 provincial election. She is currently the Vice-President, Students & Community Development at Vancouver Community College.

She represented the electoral district of Burnaby-Lougheed as a member of the British Columbia New Democratic Party from 2013 to 2017. Shin is the first Korean Canadian elected to the provincial legislature.

== Early life and education ==
Shin was born in South Korea and emigrated to Canada when she was 11 years old. Around her 16th birthday she was hospitalised for a serious health crisis attributed to leukemia or aplastic anaemia. According to Shin, the experience made her a passionate advocate for Canada's health care system.

Two months after her 16th birthday, Shin was awarded $400 by the City of Surrey, British Columbia, as part of its inaugural Youth Recognition Awards. As a child, Shin had volunteered for the Canadian Red Cross Society, Greenpeace, the Multicultural Society of B.C. and others.

== Career before politics ==
Shin studied genetics and cell biology at the University of British Columbia, participating in botanical biochemistry research on the general phenylpropanoid pathway. Shin later completed a doctorate in medicine in 2007 from Spartan Health Sciences University in Vieux Fort, St. Lucia, an institution recognised by the B.C. College of Physicians and Surgeons and the Medical Council of Canada. During medical school, Shin performed clinical rotations at University of Edinburgh, Dalhousie University, and John H. Stroger Jr. Hospital. Shin's rotational research at the Royal Victoria Infirmary of Newcastle upon Tyne led to two co-authored publications on chronic fatigue syndrome.

Shin later decided that she preferred teaching over conventional medical practice and chose not complete the residency necessary to gain a license to practice medicine in British Columbia.

Shin has taught at British Columbia Institute of Technology, Vancouver Community College, and the West Coast College of Massage Therapy.

== Provincial politics ==
Shin's intention to seek the Burnaby-Lougheed NDP nomination under the party leadership of Adrian Dix was announced in May 2012. Shin's competitor for the nomination was Craig Langston. Shin won the nomination in November 2012, ahead of the 2013 provincial election.

During the campaign, Shin faced allegations that she had misrepresented her educational credentials in her campaign materials, "Linked-in profile, a B.C. Institute of Technology biography, and in various interviews". She quickly corrected the misunderstandings and clarified that they were not intentional.

In 2013, reports surfaced of a derogatory statement Shin made against Chinese Canadians in 2002, when she was 21. Shin subsequently apologized.

Shin won 44.26% of the vote, defeating BC Liberal candidate Ken Kramer who had replaced retiring Harry Bloy who had held the riding for 12 years. Confusion surrounding Shin's credentials, her campaign, and controversy surrounding the BC Conservative Candidate Christine Clark earned Shin the title of 2013 Newsmaker of the Year from the Burnaby Now.

While in office, Shin was assigned several portfolios and roles within the Shadow Cabinet including: Lead Spokesperson for Small Business, the deputy spokesperson for Trade, Immigration, and Multiculturalism, the deputy spokesperson role for International Trade, Asia Pacific Strategy, Multiculturalism, Immigration, Intergovernmental Relations, the deputy spokesperson role for Tourism, and Arts and Culture, and served on the Select Standing Committee for Health, and the select Standing Committee for Finance & Government Services.

Shin's first motion was a private member's bill to permit electronic petitions from the public to be accepted by the legislature. The bill was designed to enhance petitioning with increased accessibility and efficiency. Shin later introduced Bill M-215, the Business Practices and Consumer Protection (Money Transfers) Amendment Act which sought to cap the fees a money broker can charge for international money transactions.

In late 2016 Shin announced that she would not run for re-election. The BC NDP nominated Katrina Chen, a Burnaby school board trustee who subsequently defeated the BC Liberal candidate Steve Darling.

== Career after politics ==
After the 2017 BC Provincial election, Shin returned to Vancouver Community College as Dean of Student Development, responsible for the strategic advancement and operational management of student service departments. In 2019, Shin was promoted to Associate Vice-President of Student Success at VCC, adding new mandates for Indigenous Education & Community Engagement, Student Wellness, Career Development, and Strategic Enrollment Management at the institution.

In 2019, Shin was named as one of Canada's Top 25 Immigrants by the Canadian Immigrant. Shin completed the Women in Leadership Program at Cornell University.

In 2020, Shin completed a Master of Education degree at Simon Fraser University. As of 2020, Shin is presently conducting Ph.D studies at the University of Toronto in Leadership, Higher & Adult Education.

In addition to her current academic roles at VCC and studies at the University of Toronto, Shin is also on the Board of the DIVERSEcity Society, and as the legacy ambassador for the BC Children's Hospital Foundation.

In 2021 Shin was appointed Vice-President, Students & Community Development at Vancouver Community College. Shin was also named as one of the recipients of the BC Achievement Community Award that recognizes the contributions of extraordinary British Columbians by BC Premier John Horgan in that same year.

== Electoral results ==
2013 British Columbia general election: Burnaby-Lougheed
Party	Candidate	Votes	%	Expenditures
New Democratic	Jane Shin	8,952	44.26	$110,599
Liberal	Ken Kramer	8,209	40.59	$71,316
Green	Darwin Augustus Ivan Burns	1,665	8.23	$376
Conservative Party of BC	Christine N. Clarke	1,399	6.92	$260
Total valid votes		20,225	100.00	
Total rejected ballots				
Turnout				
