= Raminder Gill =

Canadian politician (born c. 1950)

Raminder Singh Gill

Ontario MPP
- In office 1999–2003
- Preceded by: new district
- Succeeded by: Kuldip Kular
- Constituency: Bramalea—Gore—Malton—Springdale

Personal details
- Born: Raminder Singh Gill; 1950 or 1951 (age 74–75) Punjab, India
- Party: Progressive Conservative
- Education: Parkdale Collegiate Institute
- Alma mater: Skule, University of Toronto
- Profession: Engineer

Raminder Singh Gill (born 1950 or 1951) is an Indian-born Canadian politician in Ontario. He was a member of the Legislative Assembly of Ontario from 1999 to 2003, and has unsuccessfully sought election to the House of Commons of Canada on three occasions. He served as a citizenship judge from 2006 to 2011.

== Background ==
Gill was born to a Sikh family in Punjab, India. He was educated at the Parkdale Collegiate Institute and later attended the University of Toronto Faculty of Applied Science and Engineering where he graduated with a Master's Degree in Engineering. He works as a chemical engineer in private life, and has invented environmentally friendly products such as "The Alternative Bleach", offered by the President's Choice company. He started a private firm called Genpro Canada Ltd in 1990. Gill has been a director of the Pharmaceutical Manufacturers of Canada, and is a member of the Association of Professional Engineers of Ontario. He was also a founding member of the Malton Cougars Soccer Club.

== Politics ==
Gill tried several times to enter politics but was unsuccessful. In 1982, he ran for a seat on Peel District School Board, but lost. In 1993 he sought the federal Liberal nomination for Bramalea—Gore—Malton—Springdale, but lost to Gurbax Malhi. He ran in the 1997 federal election, as a Progressive Conservative in the riding of Mississauga West. He finished third, well behind Liberal Steve Mahoney.

=== Provincial politics ===
In the 1999 provincial election, Gill ran for the Ontario Progressive Conservatives in the riding of Bramalea--Gore--Malton--Springdale, which has a large Indian-Canadian community. The riding is located in the "905 region", which at the time was a primary base of support for the Ontario Tories. Gill was elected, defeating Liberal Dave Toor by about 4,000 votes.

During his time in government he served as Parliamentary assistant to several ministers including the Minister of Labour and to the Minister of Training, Colleges and Universities.

The Liberal Party made strong gains in the 905 area in the 2003 provincial election, and Gill lost his seat to Liberal candidate Kuldip Kular by almost 4,000 votes, following a bitter and divisive campaign.

=== Federal politics ===
In the Canadian general election of 2004, Gill ran as a candidate of the Conservative Party in the redistributed riding of Bramalea--Gore--Malton. Although this seat was actively targeted by the Conservatives, Gill lost to incumbent Liberal Gurbax Singh Malhi by 7,800 votes.

In also ran in the 2006 federal election in the riding of Mississauga—Streetsville, against Liberal incumbent Wajid Khan. He lost that contest as well, losing by about 5,800 votes to Khan.

== Citizenship judge ==
In the fall of 2006 Gill was appointed as a Federal citizenship judge. Some considered the move as a patronage appointment. Gill was thought to have been "fasttracked" into the post, bypassing the usual screening process. In 2009, he was reappointed to this position, but he was not reappointed in 2012.
