= Barry Jones (Canadian politician) =

Canadian politician

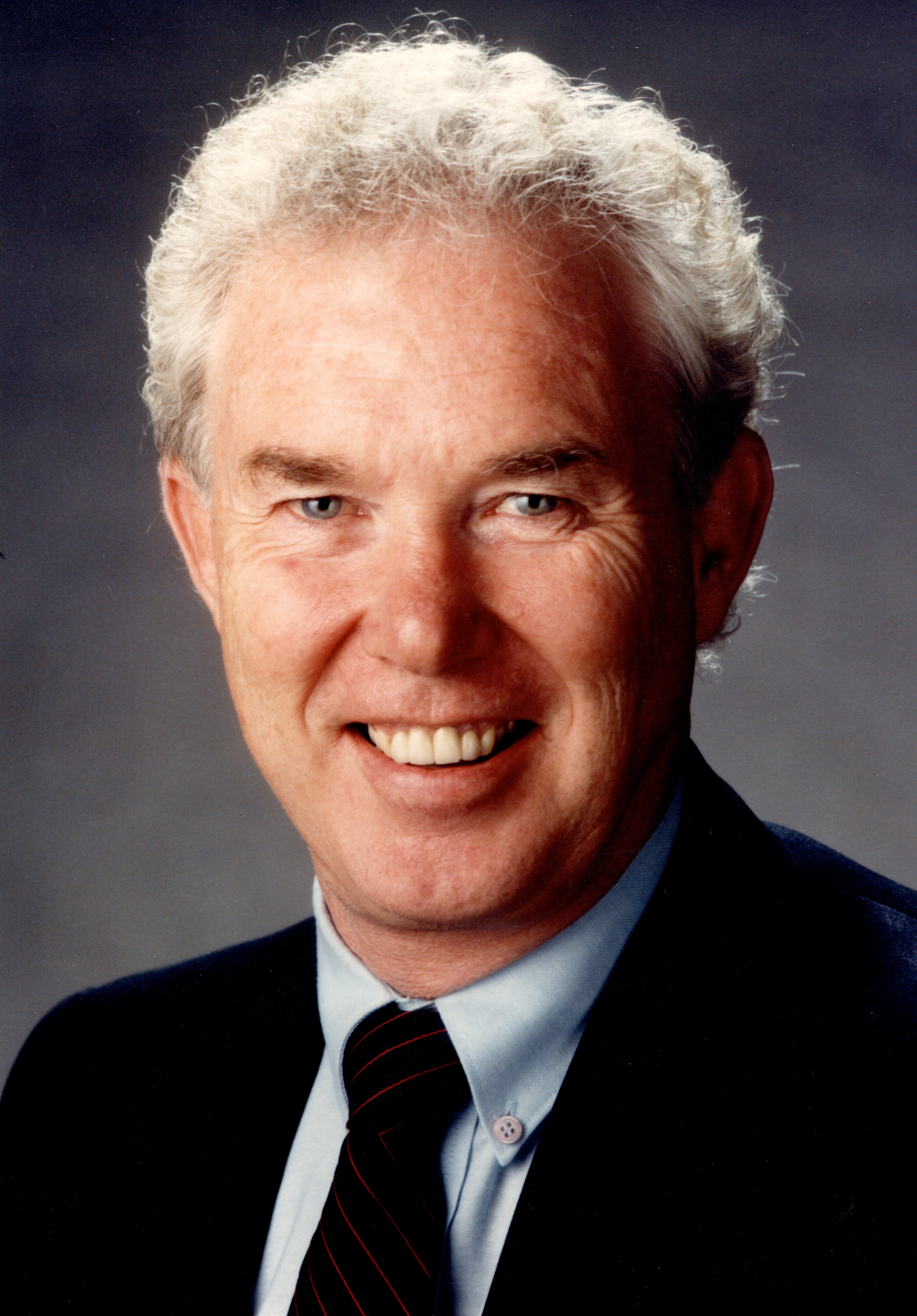

Member of the British Columbia Legislative Assembly for Burnaby North
- In office October 22, 1986 – May 28, 1996
- Preceded by: Eileen Dailly
- Succeeded by: Pietro Calendino

Personal details
- Born: November 21, 1940 (age 85) Princeton, British Columbia
- Party: British Columbia New Democratic Party
- Children: Emery Jones
- Profession: teacher

James Barry Jones (born November 21, 1940) was a Canadian politician. He served in the Legislative Assembly of British Columbia from 1986 to 1996, as a NDP member for the constituency of Burnaby North.
