= Kuldip Kular =

Canadian politician (born 1948)

Member of the Ontario Provincial Parliament for Bramalea—Gore—Malton (Bramalea—Gore—Malton—Springdale 2003—2007)
- In office 2003–2011
- Preceded by: Raminder Gill
- Succeeded by: Jagmeet Singh

Personal details
- Born: Kuldip Singh Kular; December 12, 1948 (age 77) Ludhiana, Punjab, India
- Party: Liberal
- Spouse: Jaswant Kular
- Education: Guru Nanak Dev University; Dalhousie University
- Profession: Doctor

Kuldip Singh Kular (born December 12, 1948) is an Indian-born Canadian politician and former Member of Provincial Parliament in Ontario, Canada. He was a Liberal member of the Legislative Assembly of Ontario from 2003 to 2011 representing the riding of Bramalea—Gore—Malton.

== Background ==
Kular was born and raised in a Sikh family in Ludhiana, Punjab, India and received a medical degree from Guru Nanak Dev University in Amritsar, Punjab, India. He moved to Canada in 1974, and completed two years of residency training in paediatrics at the IWK Health Centre at Dalhousie University in Nova Scotia. He then worked for two years at the Canadian Armed Forces Hospital in Halifax, Nova Scotia before starting a family practice in Campbellton, New Brunswick in 1978.

In 1986, Kular founded a family and sports medicine clinic in Brampton, Ontario, a city which has a large number of recent Indian immigrants. He was also a founding member of the Northern Indian Medical and Dental Association of Canada.

== Politics ==
In the 2003 election, Kular ran as the Liberal candidate in the riding of Bramalea-Gore-Malton-Springdale. During the campaign, it came to light that Kular had previously been disciplined by the Physician's Board. Despite the news, he defeated incumbent Progressive Conservative Raminder Singh Gill by 3,765 votes. In June 2005, he was a member of the Speaker of the Ontario Legislature’s multi-party delegation in to the 43rd Canadian Regional Conference for the Commonwealth Parliamentary Association in St. John's, Newfoundland.

In the 2007 election, Kular was re-elected in the redistributed riding of Bramalea—Gore—Malton, defeating the closest candidate, Progressive Conservative Pam Hundal, by about 6,000 votes.

In January, 2009, Kular was a member of the Premier's delegation of government and business leaders who went on a trade mission to India to develop stronger ties with this emerging market.

In October 2009, Kular was involved in an incident where he allegedly hit a pedestrian while driving in Brampton. He was charged with leaving the scene of the accident. A month later Kular resigned as parliamentary assistant to the minister of Health and Long-Term Care. In June 2010, Kular was acquitted due to contradictory evidence from witnesses. Kular was subsequently reappointed to his old post as parliamentary assistant.

In the 2011 election, he was defeated by New Democratic Party candidate Jagmeet Singh by 2,120 votes. He ran again in the 2014 election, again losing to Singh.

During his tenure, he served as parliamentary assistant to several ministers including Minister of Citizenship and Immigration, Minister Responsible for Democratic Renewal, and to the Minister of Health and Long-Term Care.
