= Northern Indian Medical & Dental Association of Canada =

- Type: non-profit organisation
- Founded: 1993
- Headquarters: Ontario, Canada
- Key people: Sanjeev Luthra, President
- Website: http://www.nimdac.com

The Northern Indian Medical & Dental Association of Canada (NIMDAC) is an association of medical doctors and dentists of Indian origin who reside in Canada and North America. There are 100 life members and more than 150 active members. It is a non profit organization which is run by the office bearers who are elected by the members annually.

NIMDAC was the brainchild of several doctors who met for the first time in the year 1987-88. This first meeting was a social gathering at one of the founding members' home and laid the foundation of this organization; members continued to meet at their homes and organize social and educational events regularly. Initially operating as an unofficial and informal organization, NIMDAC was officially registered as a non-profit organization in the year 1993.

== History ==
NIMDAC was the brainchild of Doctors P. Bariana, K. S. Grewal, Kuldip Kular, B. Purewal, R. Rana, B. Reen, and P. Sunerh, who met for the first time in the year 1987-88. This first meeting was a social gathering at one of the founding members' home and laid the foundation of this organization; members continued to meet at their homes and organize social and educational events regularly. Initially operating as an unofficial and informal organization, NIMDAC was officially registered as a non-profit organization in the year 1993.

Dr. A. S. Cheema was NIMDAC's first elected president. The quarterly publication of the newsletter was started by Dr. R. Jaidka in 1998. The organization had its own email address in 1999. Starting 15 May 2000, NIMDAC officially started its website.

== Objective ==
Its purposes are to update its members with the current medical literature, with the scientific and educational programs, which are held regularly throughout the year. The association also promotes social and cultural values to its members, spouses, children and public at large. The association also donates to the charitable organizations regularly every year.

The funds are raised from the membership dues and from the sponsors and are solely used for the purposes mentioned above. All the office bearers are volunteer workers, who with the help of its members organize educational and social events throughout the year.

== Conventions ==
Year	Location	City	General Secretary
2013	White Oaks Conference Centre	Niagara-on-the-Lake, ON	Dr. R.K. Momi, MD
2012	Deerhurst Resort	Huntsville, ON	Dr. R.K. Gill MD
2011	Marriott on the Falls	Niagara Falls, ON	Dr. J. Singh, MD
2010	White Oaks Conference Centre	Niagara-on-the-Lake, ON	Dr. R. Kumar, MD
2009	Deerhurst Resort	Huntsville, ON	Dr. V.R Chopra, MD
2008	Sheraton Fallsview Hotel	Niagara Falls, ON	Dr. A. Seth, MD
2007	Deerhurst Resort	Huntsville, ON	Dr. B.B. Kalra, MD
2006	Blue Mountain Ski Resort	Collingwood, ON	Dr. M.S. Parhar, DDS
2005	Sheraton Fallsview Hotel	Niagara Falls, ON	Dr. R.S. Rana, MD
2004	Deerhurst Resort	Huntsville, ON	Dr. B. Chawla, MD
2003	Delta Pine Stone Resort	Haliburton, ON	Dr. S. Gaur, MD
2002	Blue Mountain Ski Resort	Collingwood, ON	Dr. J. Chopra, MD
2001	Deerhurst Resort	Huntsville, ON	Dr. K. Minhas, MD
2000	Muskoka Sands Resort	Gravenhurst, ON	Dr. U. Jain, MD
1999	Sheraton Fallsview Hotel	Niagara Falls, ON	Dr. D.S. Sehgal, DMD
1998	Nottawasaga Inn Resort	Alliston, ON	Dr. R.K. Jaidka, MD
1997	Sheraton Fallsview Hotel	Niagara Falls, ON	Dr. H.S. Sandhu, DDS, Ph.D
