= Eileen Dailly =

Canadian politician (1926–2011)

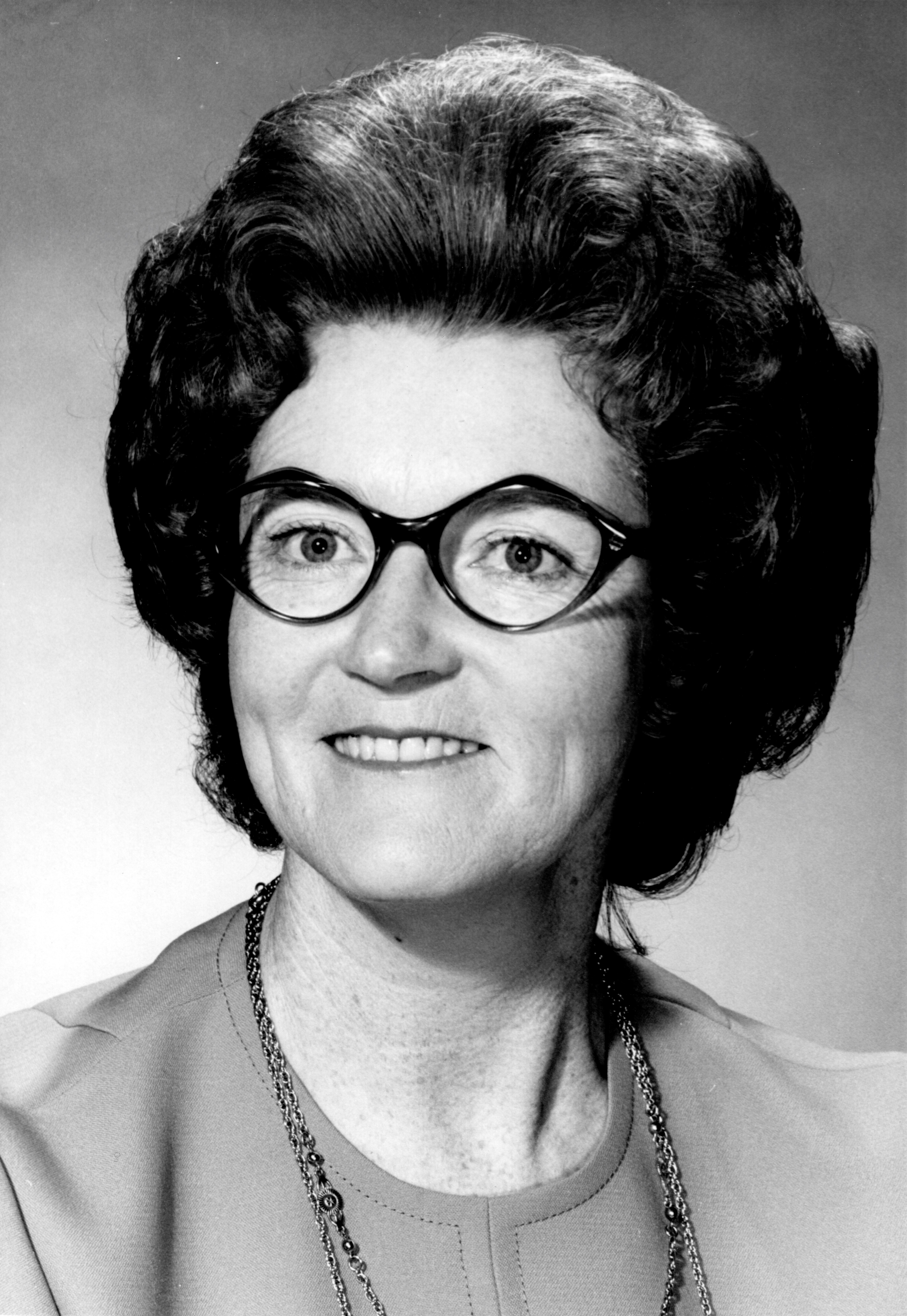

1st Deputy Premier of British Columbia
- In office 26 September 1972 – 22 December 1975
- Premier: Dave Barrett
- Preceded by: Position established
- Succeeded by: Grace McCarthy

Minister of Education of British Columbia
- In office 15 September 1972 – 22 December 1975
- Premier: Dave Barrett
- Preceded by: Donald Brothers
- Succeeded by: Pat McGeer

Member of the Legislative Assembly for Burnaby North
- In office 12 September 1966 – 22 October 1986
- Preceded by: Riding established
- Succeeded by: Barry Jones

Personal details
- Born: Eileen Elizabeth Gilmore; 15 February 1926 Vancouver, British Columbia
- Died: 17 January 2011 (aged 84) Salt Spring Island, British Columbia
- Party: New Democratic
- Other political affiliations: Burnaby Citizens Association
- Occupation: Teacher

Eileen Elizabeth Dailly (15 February 1926 – 17 January 2011) was a Canadian educator and political figure who represented Burnaby North in the Legislative Assembly of British Columbia from 1966 to 1986 as a New Democratic Party (NDP) member.

She was born Eileen Elizabeth Gilmore, the daughter of Joseph Gilmore and Mary Scott, in Vancouver, British Columbia and taught school for ten years in British Columbia. In 1951, she married James Dailly. She served ten years as a school trustee and was chairman of the Burnaby School Board for four years. In the assembly, Dailly served as deputy premier and as Minister of Education. As education minister, she banned corporal punishment in schools in 1973; she also introduced mandatory kindergarten and created the first First Nations school board in the province (School District 92 Nisga'a). She retired from politics in 1986. From 1988 to 1991, she hosted a senior's program on community cable television called "Coming of Age".

Dailly died on Salt Spring Island at the age of 84 from complications following skin cancer surgery.
