= Matthew Laird =

Canadian activist and politician

Matthew Laird (born 1977) is a Canadian academic, activist and politician. Having helped lead numerous political campaigns he continues to work with community groups on social and environmental issues.

Laird was born and raised in Vancouver, British Columbia, earning a Bachelor of Science in computer science from the University of British Columbia. After spending some years in the private sector as a software developer he returned to academia to work in bioinformatic research at Simon Fraser University. He currently resides in the City of Vancouver.

== Environmentalism ==
Laird has talked about being raised around recycling and green ideas as the basis for his environmental activism. While involved with transportation and sustainability advocacy most of his life he became most involved after moving to New Westminster in 2003.

He was a founding member of New Westminster Environmental Partners, a New Westminster focused non-partisan sustainability advocacy group. Some notable accomplishments while working with NWEP are the implementation of an anti-idling bylaw, a cosmetic pesticide ban, pedestrian safety improvements at New Westminster SkyTrain Station and a Sustainability Documentary Film Festival. Laird was also a proponent for New Westminster's Royal City Farmers Market and has served on the board of directors for three years.

Always an advocate for transit and sustainable transportation, Laird is a member of the Livable Region Coalition. In conjunction with his NWEP work, Laird was a leader of the campaign to stop TransLink's United Boulevard Extension project. He's a motorman on Vancouver's Vancouver Downtown Historic Railway and was a driver on Bombardier's Olympic Line during the 2010 Winter Olympics.

== Politics ==
Laird was the co-founder of RecallBC, a non-partisan organization which failed in a number of attempts to recall BC Liberal MLAs.

Laird was elected leader of the short-lived Moderate Democratic Movement political party in 2003. He led the party into the British Columbia Democratic Coalition which eventually became the Democratic Reform British Columbia party, serving as the new party's first president. Laird was DRBC's organizational chair and was the candidate in riding of Burnaby North during the May 2005 general election.

As founding member of DRBC, Laird was the main author of the party's constitution and co-author of the party platform. After the founding of the new party, Laird remained the party's chief organizer, chairing the founding convention and AGM in 2005. He was the party's provincial campaign chair during the 2005 provincial election. Laird also served the party's main public relations coordinator, penning most releases and maintaining the party infrastructure such as the website, e-mail, and phone system.

In the 2005 B.C. General Election Laird ran in the Burnaby North riding for Democratic Reform British Columbia. He finished last in a field of four candidates with 316 votes (1.38% of total valid votes).

Laird later ran for New Westminster city council in November 2005, receiving 1010 votes (lowest vote count receiving a seat was 3432).

In March 2006, Laird released the Democratic Reform British Columbia Gateway Strategy, of which he was the main author. The report was an alternative vision to the BC Liberal plan for Greater Vancouver long term transportation planning.

A year later in March 2007, Laird released the Democratic Reform British Columbia Sustainable Energy Platform, detailing the party vision for renewable energy production and conservation for the province.

Laird resigned from DRBC in late 2008 to accept an invitation to join the Green Party. He accepted the nomination to run for the party in the May 2009 Provincial Election in New Westminster. He was also appointed as the party's Higher Education Critic.

At the civic level, Laird served as the president of the Quayside Community Board in 2010, a New Westminster resident's association representing 4,000 condo and townhouse owners.

== Electoral record ==
2005 British Columbia general election: Burnaby North
Party	Candidate	Votes	%
Liberal	Richard T. Lee	10,421	45.59
New Democratic	Pietro Calendino	10,356	45.31
Green	Richard Brand	1,763	7.71
Democratic Reform	Matthew Laird	316	1.38
Total valid votes		22,856	100.00
Total rejected ballots		155	0.68
Turnout		23,011	59.76
Source: Elections BC

B.C. General Election 2009 New Westminster
Party	Candidate	Votes	%	±%
New Democratic	Dawn Black	13,418		
Liberal	Carole Millar	8,240		
Green	Matthew Laird	2,151		–
Total valid votes		23,809		

Election	Type	Total votes
New Westminster City council 2005	Municipal General	1010
New Westminster City council 2008	Municipal General	1923
