= Richard Lee (Canadian politician) =

Canadian politician (born 1954)

Richard T. Lee
- 李燦明
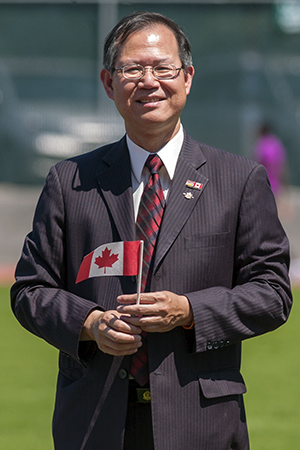
- Lee in 2013

Burnaby City Councillor
- Incumbent
- Assumed office 2022

Deputy Speaker of the Legislative Assembly of British Columbia
- In office September 28, 2015 – June 22, 2017
- Preceded by: Douglas Horne
- Succeeded by: Greg Kyllo

Member of the British Columbia Legislative Assembly for Burnaby North
- In office May 16, 2001 – May 9, 2017
- Preceded by: Pietro Calendino
- Succeeded by: Janet Routledge

Personal details
- Born: 1954 (age 71–72) Zhongshan, People's Republic of China
- Party: New Burnaby
- Other political affiliations: BC Liberal; Liberal Party of Canada; One Burnaby (2022-2026)
- Education: University of British Columbia (B.Sc., M.Sc.)

Chinese name
- Traditional Chinese: 李燦明
- Simplified Chinese: 李灿明
Transcriptions
Standard Mandarin
- Hanyu Pinyin: Lǐ Cànmíng
Yue: Cantonese
- Jyutping: Lei^{5} Caan^{3} Ming^{4}

Richard T. Lee (simplified Chinese: 李灿明; traditional Chinese: 李燦明; born 1954) is a Canadian politician. A city councillor in Burnaby, British Columbia since 2022, he previously represented the electoral district of Burnaby North in the Legislative Assembly of British Columbia from 2001 to 2017, as part of the BC Liberal caucus.

== Background ==
Born in Zhongshan, People's Republic of China in 1954, Lee lived in Hong Kong and Macau before moving to Canada in 1971 to join his grandfather, who entered the country in 1913 by paying the Chinese head tax. He studied physics and mathematics at the University of British Columbia, earning a bachelor of science degree in 1976 and a master of science degree in 1980; he also worked at the university as a programmer analyst at Triumf. He has lived in Burnaby since 1986 with his late wife Anne, with whom he raised three children.

== Political career ==
A member of the BC Liberal Party since 1993, Lee first contested the riding of Burnaby North in the 1996 election, but lost to Pietro Calendino of the BC New Democratic Party (NDP). He faced Calendino again in the 2001 election, this time winning the seat with 54.37% of the vote. He was re-elected in the 2005, 2009 and 2013 elections before losing to the NDP's Janet Routledge in 2017.

During his time as member of the Legislative Assembly (MLA), he served as Parliamentary Secretary for the Asia-Pacific Initiative from June 2005 to May 2009, as well as deputy chair of the Special Committee to Appoint a Merit Commissioner and chair of the Government Caucus Asian Economic Development Committee. He was appointed Parliamentary Secretary for the Asia Pacific Strategy to the Minister of International Trade and Minister Responsible for the Asia Pacific Strategy and Multiculturalism in June 2013, and Parliamentary Secretary for traditional Chinese medicine in December of the same year.

In April 2015, a constituent in Burnaby North launched a recall petition under the British Columbia Elections Act. The proponent turned in less than 10% of the required number of signatures and the petition failed. In September 2015, Lee was appointed Deputy Speaker of the Legislative Assembly, the first MLA of Asian descent in B.C. to serve in that capacity.

Following the resignation of Karen Wang, Lee took over as the Liberal Party of Canada's candidate in the 2019 Burnaby South federal by-election, against New Democratic Party leader Jagmeet Singh and Conservative Party of Canada candidate Jay Shin. Lee finished in second place behind Singh, with 26% of the vote. Due to his wife's illness, he declined to seek the Liberal nomination for Burnaby South in the October 2019 federal election, thereby ruling out a rematch with Singh.

Lee joined municipal party One Burnaby in 2022, and was elected to the Burnaby City Council in that year's municipal election. He founded the New Burnaby party ahead of the 2026 municipal election, and won re-election as the party's sole councillor.

== 2015 detention in China ==
In November 2015, Lee and his family were detained by the Chinese Public Security Bureau upon arrival to Shanghai, China. During his detention, Chinese officials examined his personal phone, and British Columbia Legislative Assembly phone. Lee and his family were released without charge and was forcibly removed from China.

Lee later recounted his experience to various members of Canada's Federal Cabinet and then-Chinese ambassador to Canada Lu Shaye, but received no acknowledgement of the incident from both the Government of Canada, nor the Government of China. Lee elected not to publicly disclose the incident until November 2019, citing concerns of creating a rift in Canada–China bilateral relations.

The Prime Minister's Office acknowledged receipt of Lee's correspondence 4 years later, in November 2019.

== Electoral record ==
=== Federal elections ===
Canadian federal by-election, February 25, 2019: Burnaby South Resignation of Kennedy Stewart
Party	Candidate	Votes	%	±%	Expenditures
New Democratic	Jagmeet Singh	8,848	38.86	+3.79	$107,876.69
Liberal	Richard Lee	5,919	26.00	–7.88	$120,398.75
Conservative	Jay Shin	5,147	22.61	–4.51	$124,688.15
People's	Laura-Lynn Tyler Thompson	2,422	10.64	–	$87,790.22
Independent	Terry Grimwood	242	1.06	–	$5,983.61
Independent	Valentine Wu	190	0.84	–	$704.17
Total valid votes/expense limit		22,768	99.17	–	$132,377.49
Total rejected ballots		190	0.83	+0.23	
Turnout		22,958	29.96	–30.82	
Eligible voters		76,618			
New Democratic hold		Swing		+5.84	
Source: Elections Canada

=== Provincial elections ===
2017 British Columbia general election: Burnaby North
Party	Candidate	Votes	%	±%	Expenditures
New Democratic	Janet Routledge	11,448	48.57	+4.72	$53,926.39
Liberal	Richard T. Lee	9,290	39.42	−7.40	$62,342.21
Green	Peter Hallschmid	2,831	12.01	+5.01	$1,106.54
Total valid votes		23,569	100.00	–	
Total rejected ballots		171	0.72	−0.03	
Turnout		23,740	60.39	+5.36	
Registered voters		39,312			
New Democratic gain from Liberal		Swing		+6.06	
Source: Elections BC

2013 British Columbia general election: Burnaby North
Party	Candidate	Votes	%
Liberal	Richard T. Lee	10,543	46.82
New Democratic	Janet Routledge	9,875	43.85
Green	Carrie McLaren	1,577	7.00
No Affiliation	Wayne Michael Marklund	523	2.32
Total valid votes		22,518	100.00
Total rejected ballots		170	0.75
Turnout		22,688	55.03
Source: Elections BC

2009 British Columbia general election: Burnaby North
Party	Candidate	Votes	%
Liberal	Richard T. Lee	9,880	48.19
New Democratic	Mondee Redman	9,332	45.51
Green	Doug Perry	1,292	6.30
Total valid votes		20,504	100.00
Total rejected ballots		178	0.86
Turnout		20,682	53.85
Source: Elections BC

2005 British Columbia general election: Burnaby North
Party	Candidate	Votes	%
Liberal	Richard T. Lee	10,421	45.59
New Democratic	Pietro Calendino	10,356	45.31
Green	Richard Brand	1,763	7.71
Democratic Reform	Matthew Laird	316	1.38
Total valid votes		22,856	100.00
Total rejected ballots		155	0.68
Turnout		23,011	59.76
Source: Elections BC

2001 British Columbia general election: Burnaby North
Party	Candidate	Votes	%
Liberal	Richard T. Lee	11,062	54.37
New Democratic	Pietro Calendino	5,992	29.45
Green	Tom Hetherington	2,824	13.88
Marijuana	Dale Ware	466	2.30
Total valid votes		20,344	100.00
Total rejected ballots		102	0.50
Turnout		20,446	71.52
Source: Elections BC

1996 British Columbia general election: Burnaby North
Party	Candidate	Votes	%
New Democratic	Pietro Calendino	8,926	45.47
Liberal	Richard T. Lee	8,160	41.57
Reform	Daniela Bosa	1,081	5.51
Progressive Democrat	Richard A.Y Lee	976	4.97
Green	Tom Hetherington	395	2.01
Natural Law	Derek Nadeau	62	0.31
Libertarian	Carlo Nigro	31	0.16
Total valid votes		19,631	100.00
Total rejected ballots		180	0.91
Turnout		19,811	72.70
Source: Elections BC

=== Municipal elections ===
2026 Burnaby City Council election

Party	Council candidate	Vote	%
Burnaby Citizens Association	Joe Keithley (X)	18,073	5.51
Burnaby Citizens Association	Cindy Lee	17,429	5.32
Burnaby Citizens Association	Ryan Erwin	16,456	5.02
Burnaby Citizens Association	Maita Santiago (X)	16,292	4.97
Burnaby Citizens Association	Daniel Tetrault (X)	15,288	4.66
Burnaby Citizens Association	James Wang (X)	15,058	4.59
New Burnaby	Richard T. Lee (X)	13,257	4.04
Burnaby Citizens Association	Kiran Singh	13,209	4.03

2022 Burnaby City Council election

Party	Council candidate	Vote	%
Burnaby Citizens Association	Alison Gu (X)	17,340	8.08
Burnaby Citizens Association	James Wang (X)	13,024	6.07
Burnaby Citizens Association	Pietro Calendino (X)	12,494	5.82
Burnaby Citizens Association	Sav Dhaliwal (X)	12,335	5.74
Burnaby Green Party	Joe Keithley (X)	11,383	5.30
Burnaby Citizens Association	Maita Santiago	11,347	5.28
One Burnaby	Richard T. Lee	11,231	5.23
Burnaby Citizens Association	Daniel Tetrault	10,891	5.07
