= Bramalea—Gore—Malton—Springdale (provincial electoral district) =

Former provincial electoral district in Ontario, Canada

Bramalea—Gore—Malton—Springdale was a provincial electoral district in central Ontario, Canada, that elected one Member of the Legislative Assembly of Ontario. It was created in 1999 from Brampton North, Brampton South, and Mississauga North. It was abolished in 2007 into Bramalea—Gore—Malton, Brampton—Springdale and Mississauga—Brampton South.

The riding included Brampton east of Dixie Road and Mississauga east of Hurontario Street and north of the 401.

== Members of Provincial Parliament ==
1. Raminder Gill, Ontario Progressive Conservative Party (1999–2003)
2. Kuldip Kular, Ontario Liberal Party (2003–2007)

== Election results ==
2003 Ontario general election
Party	Candidate	Votes	%	±%
Liberal	Kuldip Kular	19,306	45.61	+6.80
Progressive Conservative	Raminder Gill	15,549	36.73	–12.65
New Democratic	Cesar Martello	4,931	11.65	+5.75
Green	Ernst Braendli	1,176	2.78	–
Independent	Frank Chilelli	868	2.05	–
Communist	Howard Cukoff	503	1.19	–
Total valid votes		42,333	98.78	
Total rejected, unmarked and declined ballots		523	1.22	–0.14
Turnout		42,856	49.82	–1.44
Eligible voters		86,026		
Liberal gain from Progressive Conservative		Swing		+9.73
Source: Elections Ontario

1999 Ontario general election
Party	Candidate	Votes	%
Progressive Conservative	Raminder Gill	18,442	49.38
Liberal	Dave Toor	14,492	38.81
Independent	Roy Willis	2,206	5.91
New Democratic	Vishnu Roche	2,204	5.90
Total valid votes		37,344	98.64
Total rejected, unmarked and declined ballots		515	1.36
Turnout		37,859	51.26
Eligible voters		73,860	
Progressive Conservative pickup new district.			
Source: Elections Ontario

== See also ==
- List of Ontario provincial electoral districts
- Canadian provincial electoral districts
