= Pietro Calendino =

Canadian politician

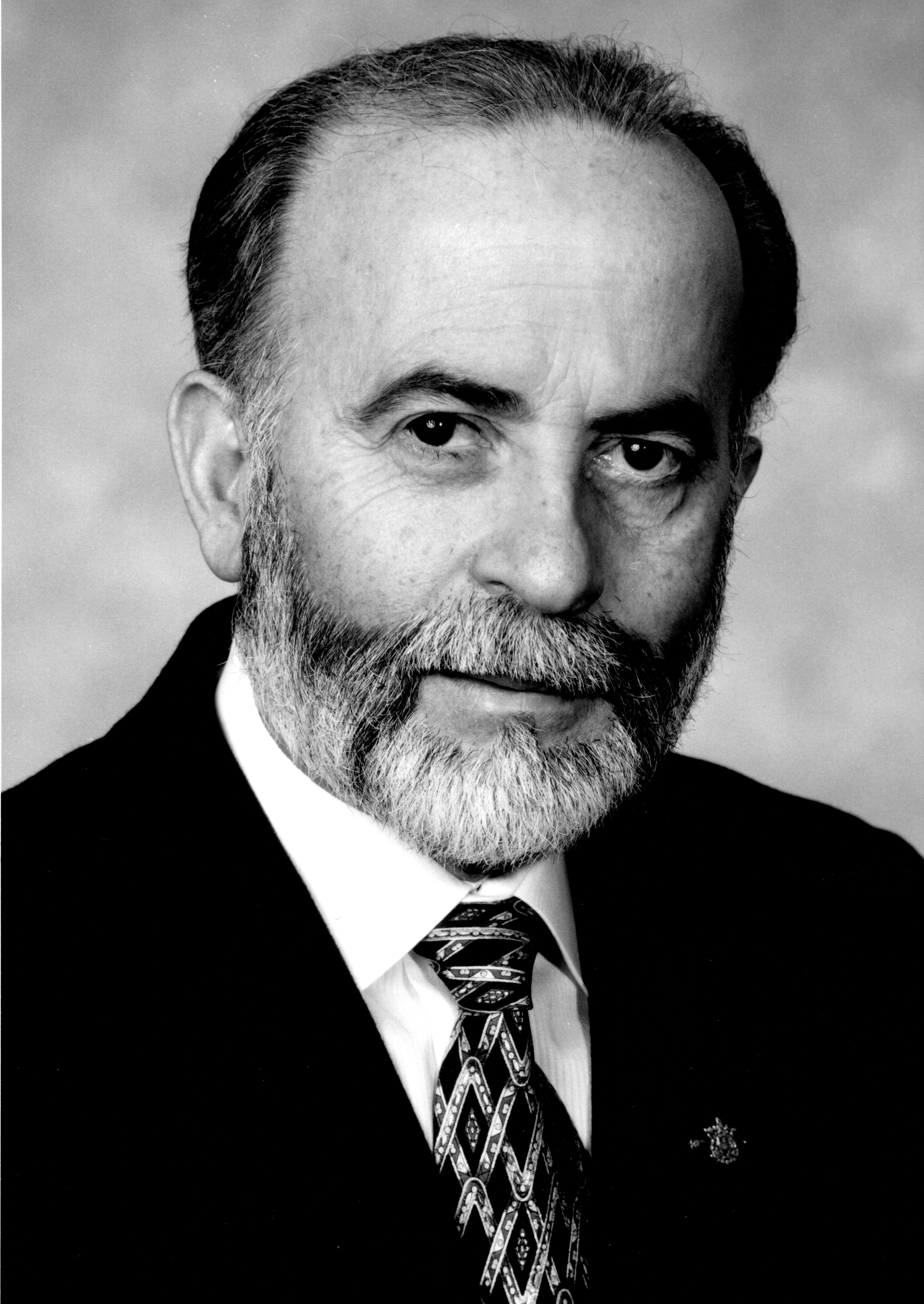

Burnaby City Councillor
- Incumbent
- Assumed office 2002

Member of the British Columbia Legislative Assembly for Burnaby North
- In office May 28, 1996 – May 16, 2001
- Preceded by: Barry Jones
- Succeeded by: Richard Lee

Personal details
- Born: circa 1943 Calabria, Italy
- Party: New Democratic Party; Burnaby Citizens Association

Pietro Attilio Calendino is a Canadian provincial and municipal politician currently serving as a city councillor for Burnaby City Council.

Calendino was born in Calabria, Italy but emigrated to Vancouver in 1959. He received an Honours B.A. and a M.A. (Languages) from the University of British Columbia. He received a teaching certificate from Simon Fraser University and has taught in secondary schools in Burnaby and Delta.

He helped found the BC Heritage Languages Association. He has served as president of the BC Association of Teachers of Modern Languages, director of the Burnaby Multicultural Society and vice-president of the National Congress of Italian Canadians.

== Politics ==
Calendino was elected as a Burnaby school trustee in 1987, and re-elected in 1990 and 1993. While on the school board he established language classes in Italian, Japanese, Mandarin, Spanish and Punjabi. He also established a zero tolerance policy towards violence and bullying in schools which was later adopted province-wide. He served as school board chair in 1993 and 1994.

In the 1996 B.C. general election he was elected to the Provincial Legislature as a New Democratic Party of British Columbia candidate in the Burnaby North riding. In July 1999, he was appointed Parliamentary Secretary to the Minister of Small Business, Tourism and Culture. He was best known for establishing funds for the Burnaby School District's Children's Dental Clinic, the Heights Fountain Square project and the Elizabeth Fry Society for women in need.

In the 2001 B.C. general election, Calendino ran for re-election in the riding of Burnaby North but lost to Richard T. Lee, the BC Liberal candidate. Calendino placed second in a field of four candidate with 5,992 votes (29.45% of total valid votes).

In 2002, he was elected to the Burnaby City Council as a member of the Burnaby Citizens' Association. On council he strongly supported the Reduction of Cosmetic Pesticides Policy and opposed Richmond's acquisition of the Olympic Oval and the construction of Canada Line SkyTrain. He also chaired the Simon Fraser Liaison Committee and was involved with the Environment Committee and the Community Policing Committee.

In the 2005 B.C. general election Calendino ran as the NDP candidate in the Burnaby North riding. He narrowly lost to Richard T. Lee, the BC Liberal candidate. Calendino placed second in a field of four candidate with 10,356 votes (45.31% of total valid votes).

Calendino was re-elected to the Burnaby City Council as part of the Burnaby Citizens' Association slate during the 2005 election. He is a director of the GVRD Labour Relations Bureau and a member of the GVRD Parks Committee. He chairs the executive committee of council and the community policing committee. He is also vice chair of the environment committee. He has been subsequently re-elected to City Council in the 2008, 2011, 2014, 2018, and 2022 municipal elections.

In 2026, Calendino endorsed Avi Lewis in that year's federal NDP leadership race.

== Partial electoral results ==
2005 British Columbia general election: Burnaby North
Party	Candidate	Votes	%
Liberal	Richard T. Lee	10,421	45.59
New Democratic	Pietro Calendino	10,356	45.31
Green	Richard Brand	1,763	7.71
Democratic Reform	Matthew Laird	316	1.38
Total valid votes		22,856	100.00
Total rejected ballots		155	0.68
Turnout		23,011	59.76
Source: Elections BC
