= 2019 Burnaby South federal by-election =

← 2015	February 25, 2019	Oct. 2019 →

Riding of Burnaby South
- Turnout: 30.10% (▼30.68pp)
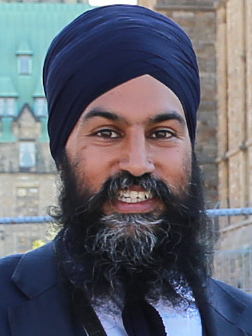

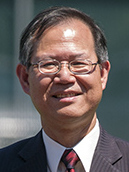

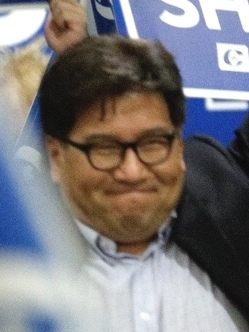
	First party	Second party
Candidate	Jagmeet Singh	Richard T. Lee
Party	New Democratic	Liberal
Popular vote	8,848	5,919
Percentage	38.90%	26.02%
Swing	▲3.83pp	▼7.86pp
	Third party	Fourth party
		PPC
Candidate	Jay Shin	Laura-Lynn Tyler Thompson
Party	Conservative	People's
Popular vote	5,147	2,422
Percentage	22.63%	10.65%
Swing	▼4.48pp	New party
Results by polling division
Singh:
<40% 40-50% 50–60% 60–70% >70%
Lee:
<40% 40-50%
Shin:
<40% 40-50%
Tie
MP before election
Kennedy Stewart
New Democratic
Elected MP
Jagmeet Singh
New Democratic

A by-election was held in the federal riding of Burnaby South on February 25, 2019 following the resignation of incumbent New Democratic MP Kennedy Stewart on September 14, 2018.

Jagmeet Singh, the federal leader of the NDP since October 1, 2017, won the by-election after having served as his party's leader without a seat in the House of Commons for over a year.

== Background ==
=== Riding profile ===
The riding of Burnaby South was created by the 2012 federal electoral boundaries redistribution and was first contested in the 2015 federal election.

==== Demographics ====
According to the 2016 Canadian Census, Chinese Canadians make up a plurality of the riding's population, while a majority of the riding's population speaks a mother tongue that is neither English nor French.

=== Resignation of Kennedy Stewart ===
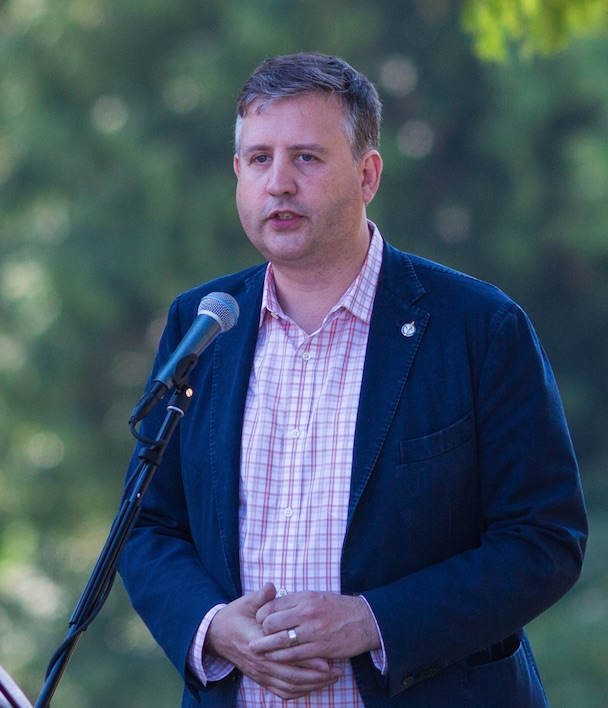
Kennedy Stewart resigned from the House of Commons on September 14, 2018 to pursue a run for Mayor of Vancouver as an independent.

On May 10, incumbent MP Kennedy Stewart publicly revealed that he was considering a run for mayor of Vancouver in the city's 2018 elections. Stewart formally confirmed his candidacy for Vancouver mayor on May 14, announcing that he would resign his seat in Parliament before the election.

== Candidate nominations ==
=== Conservative ===
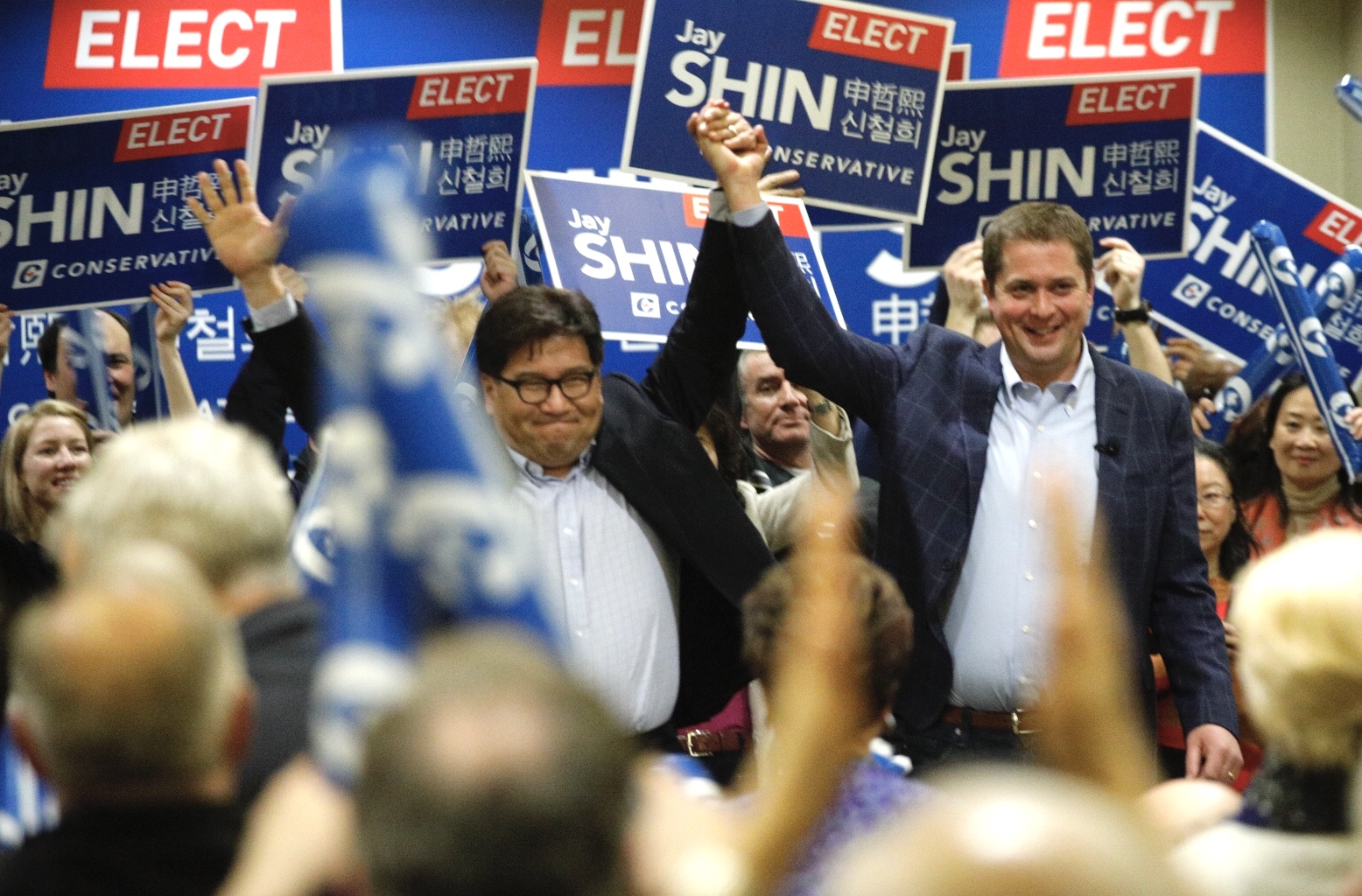
Conservative nominee Jay Shin campaigns alongside party leader Andrew Scheer

=== People's ===
The People's Party of Canada announced Laura-Lynn Tyler Thompson as their party's candidate for the by-election on January 8, 2019. She had previously been a host on the Canadian edition of The 700 Club and had earlier run to be a trustee on the Burnaby Board of Education in November of the previous year.

=== Independent candidacies ===
Valentine Wu, who was the BC Greens candidate in the 2017 provincial election for the riding of Burnaby-Edmonds, announced on January 17, 2019 that he would contest the by-election.

=== Non-contesting parties ===
The Green Party had previously promised not to run a candidate against Jagmeet Singh if he were to run in a by-election. Green Party Leader Elizabeth May reiterated the party's plans to give Singh "leader's courtesy" on August 16 after he announced his candidacy.

Although the Libertarian Party had announced on its blog the selection of Rex Brocki as their candidate, he did not register and ultimately did not appear on the ballot.

== Results ==
Canadian federal by-election, February 25, 2019: Burnaby South Resignation of Kennedy Stewart
Party	Candidate	Votes	%	±%
New Democratic	Jagmeet Singh	8,848	38.90	+3.83
Liberal	Richard T. Lee	5,919	26.02	–7.86
Conservative	Jay Shin	5,147	22.63	–4.48
People's	Laura-Lynn Thompson	2,422	10.65	–
Independent	Terry Grimwood	242	1.06	–
Independent	Valentine Wu	168	0.74	–
Total valid votes/expense limit		22,746	99.17	–
Total rejected ballots		190	0.83	+0.23
Turnout		22,936	30.10	-30.68
Eligible voters		76,204		
New Democratic hold		Swing		+5.84
Source: Elections Canada

== See also ==
- By-elections to the 42nd Canadian Parliament
