= Janet Routledge =

Canadian politician

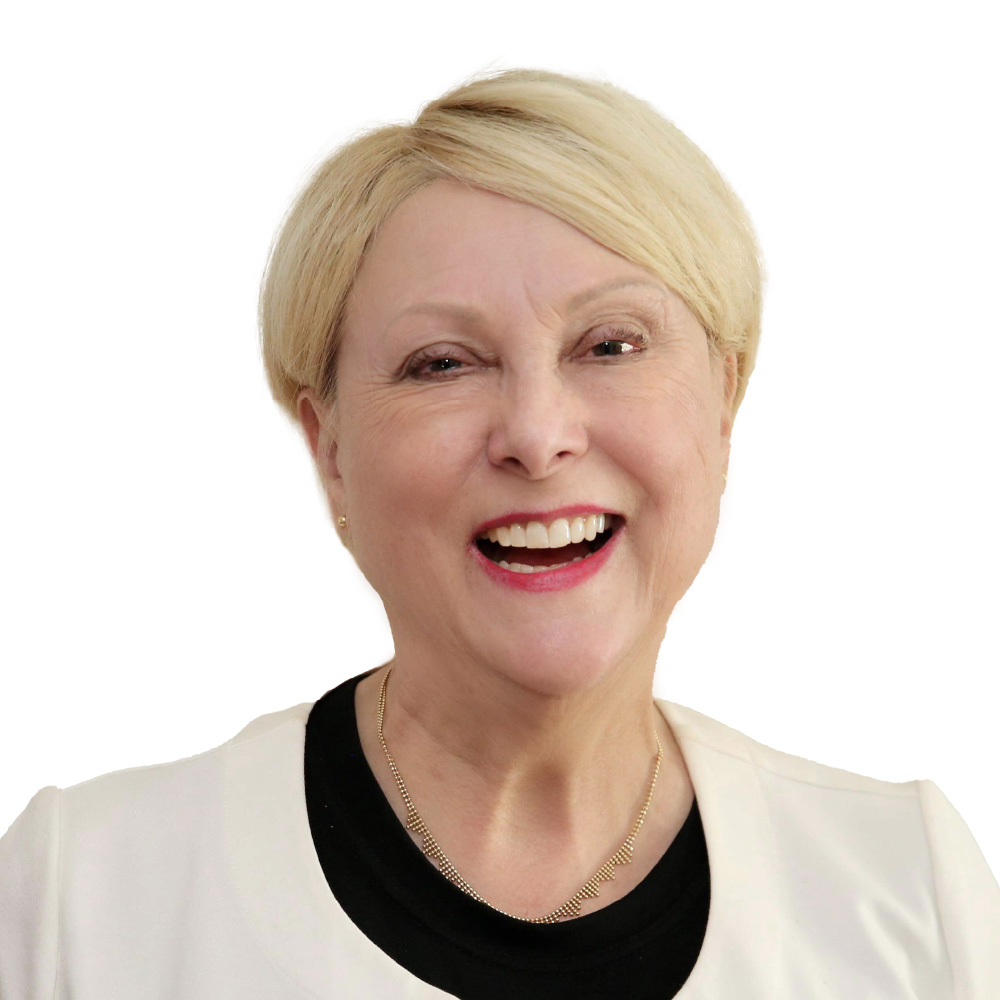
- Campaign portrait, 2024

Government Whip of the Legislative Assembly of British Columbia
- In office November 18, 2024 – November 20, 2026
- Premier: David Eby
- Preceded by: Garry Begg
- Succeeded by: Macklin McCall

Parliamentary Secretary for Labour of British Columbia
- In office December 7, 2022 – November 18, 2024
- Premier: David Eby
- Preceded by: Office established
- Succeeded by: Darlene Rotchford

Member of the British Columbia Legislative Assembly for Burnaby North
- In office May 9, 2017 – October 24, 2026
- Preceded by: Richard Lee
- Succeeded by: Simon Chandler

Personal details
- Party: New Democratic

Janet Routledge is a Canadian politician who served as a member of the Legislative Assembly of British Columbia (MLA) representing the electoral district of Burnaby North from 2017 to 2026. A member of the New Democratic Party, she served as the caucus whip from 2024 to 2026.

In 2026, Routledge endorsed Rob Ashton in that year's federal NDP leadership race.

== Electoral history ==
2026 British Columbia general election: Burnaby North
Party	Candidate	Votes	%	±%	Expenditures
Conservative	Simon Chandler	9,077	46.15		
New Democratic	Janet Routledge	8,265	42.02		
Green	Maddy Kennedy-Parrott	1,824	9.27	—	
OneBC	Jenny Yamagata	447	2.27	—	
Total valid votes		19,613	99.72		
Total rejected ballots		55	0.28		
Turnout		19,668			
Registered voters					
Conservative gain from New Democratic		Swing		+7.24	
Source: Elections BC

2024 British Columbia general election: Burnaby North
Party	Candidate	Votes	%	±%	Expenditures
New Democratic	Janet Routledge	10,724	53.26	−3.9	$41,741.28
Conservative	Michael Wu	8,658	43.00	–	$68,861.64
Independent	Martin Kendell	754	3.74	–	$1,185.12
Total valid votes/expense limit		20,136	99.77	–	$71,700.08
Total rejected ballots		47	0.23	–	
Turnout		20,183	53.42	–	
Registered voters		37,785			
New Democratic notional hold		Swing		−23.5	
Source: Elections BC

2020 British Columbia general election: Burnaby North
Party	Candidate	Votes	%	±%	Expenditures
New Democratic	Janet Routledge	12,894	57.80	+9.23	$41,933.88
Liberal	Raymond Dong	6,846	30.69	−8.73	$20,148.25
Green	Norine Shim	2,568	11.51	−0.50	$3,015.12
Total valid votes		22,308	100.00	–	
Total rejected ballots					
Turnout					
Registered voters					
New Democratic hold		Swing		+8.98	
Source: Elections BC

2017 British Columbia general election: Burnaby North
Party	Candidate	Votes	%	±%	Expenditures
New Democratic	Janet Routledge	11,448	48.57	+4.72	$53,926.39
Liberal	Richard T. Lee	9,290	39.42	−7.40	$62,342.21
Green	Peter Hallschmid	2,831	12.01	+5.01	$1,106.54
Total valid votes		23,569	100.00	–	
Total rejected ballots		171	0.72	−0.03	
Turnout		23,740	60.39	+5.36	
Registered voters		39,312			
New Democratic gain from Liberal		Swing		+6.06	
Source: Elections BC

2013 British Columbia general election: Burnaby North
Party	Candidate	Votes	%
Liberal	Richard T. Lee	10,543	46.82
New Democratic	Janet Routledge	9,875	43.85
Green	Carrie McLaren	1,577	7.00
No Affiliation	Wayne Michael Marklund	523	2.32
Total valid votes		22,518	100.00
Total rejected ballots		170	0.75
Turnout		22,688	55.03
Source: Elections BC
