= Burnaby North =

Provincial electoral district in British Columbia, Canada

Coordinates: 49.273°N 122.971°W

British Columbia electoral district
- Location in Burnaby

Provincial electoral district
- Legislature: Legislative Assembly of British Columbia
MLA
Simon Chandler
Conservative
- District created: 1966
- First contested: 1966
- Last contested: 2026

Demographics
- Population (2001): 53,415
- Area (km²): 22.94
- Pop. density (per km²): 2,328.5
- Census division: Metro Vancouver
- Census subdivision: Burnaby

Burnaby North is a provincial electoral district for the Legislative Assembly of British Columbia, Canada.

== Members of the Legislative Assembly ==
Burnaby North
Assembly	Years	Member	Party
Riding created from Burnaby
28th	1966–1969	Eileen Dailly	New Democratic
29th	1969–1972	Eileen Dailly	New Democratic
30th	1972–1975	Eileen Dailly	New Democratic
31st	1975–1979	Eileen Dailly	New Democratic
32nd	1979–1983	Eileen Dailly	New Democratic
33rd	1983–1986	Eileen Dailly	New Democratic
34th	1986–1991	Barry Jones	New Democratic
35th	1991–1996	Barry Jones	New Democratic
36th	1996–2001	Pietro Calendino	New Democratic
37th	2001–2005	Richard Lee	Liberal
38th	2005–2009	Richard Lee	Liberal
39th	2009–2013	Richard Lee	Liberal
40th	2013–2017	Richard Lee	Liberal
41st	2017–2020	Janet Routledge	New Democratic
42nd	2020–2024	Janet Routledge	New Democratic
43rd	2024–2026	Janet Routledge	New Democratic
44th	2026–present	Simon Chandler	Conservative

== Election results ==
2026 British Columbia general election
Party	Candidate	Votes	%	±%	Expenditures
Conservative	Simon Chandler	8,257	46.5	+3.5	
New Democratic	Janet Routledge	7,478	42.1	-11.2	
Green	Maddy Kennedy-Parrott	1,618	9.1	-	
OneBC	Jenny Yamagata	413	2.3	-	
Total valid votes		17,766			
Total rejected ballots					
Turnout					
Registered voters					
Conservative gain from New Democratic		Swing		+4.4	
Source: Elections BC

2024 British Columbia general election
Party	Candidate	Votes	%	±%	Expenditures
New Democratic	Janet Routledge	10,724	53.26	−3.9	$41,741.28
Conservative	Michael Wu	8,658	43.00	–	$68,861.64
Independent	Martin Kendell	754	3.74	–	$1,185.12
Total valid votes/expense limit		20,136	99.77	–	$71,700.08
Total rejected ballots		47	0.23	–	
Turnout		20,183	53.42	–	
Registered voters		37,785			
New Democratic notional hold		Swing		−23.5	
Source: Elections BC

2020 provincial election redistributed results
Party	%
New Democratic	57.2
Liberal	31.5
Green	11.3

2020 British Columbia general election
Party	Candidate	Votes	%	±%	Expenditures
New Democratic	Janet Routledge	12,894	57.80	+9.23	$41,933.88
Liberal	Raymond Dong	6,846	30.69	−8.73	$20,148.25
Green	Norine Shim	2,568	11.51	−0.50	$3,015.12
Total valid votes		22,308	100.00	–	
Total rejected ballots					
Turnout					
Registered voters					
New Democratic hold		Swing		+8.98	
Source: Elections BC

2017 British Columbia general election
Party	Candidate	Votes	%	±%	Expenditures
New Democratic	Janet Routledge	11,448	48.57	+4.72	$53,926.39
Liberal	Richard T. Lee	9,290	39.42	−7.40	$62,342.21
Green	Peter Hallschmid	2,831	12.01	+5.01	$1,106.54
Total valid votes		23,569	100.00	–	
Total rejected ballots		171	0.72	−0.03	
Turnout		23,740	60.39	+5.36	
Registered voters		39,312			
New Democratic gain from Liberal		Swing		+6.06	
Source: Elections BC

2013 British Columbia general election
Party	Candidate	Votes	%
Liberal	Richard T. Lee	10,543	46.82
New Democratic	Janet Routledge	9,875	43.85
Green	Carrie McLaren	1,577	7.00
No Affiliation	Wayne Michael Marklund	523	2.32
Total valid votes		22,518	100.00
Total rejected ballots		170	0.75
Turnout		22,688	55.03
Source: Elections BC

B.C. General Election 2009 Burnaby North
Party	Candidate	Votes	%	±	Expenditures
Liberal	Richard Lee	9,880	48.19%		$106,301
New Democratic	Mondee Redman	9,332	45.51%		$69,538
Green	Doug Perry	1,292	6.30%	–	$1,889
Total valid votes		20,504	100%		
Total rejected ballots		178	0.86%		
Turnout		20,682	53.85%		

2005 British Columbia general election
Party	Candidate	Votes	%
Liberal	Richard T. Lee	10,421	45.59
New Democratic	Pietro Calendino	10,356	45.31
Green	Richard Brand	1,763	7.71
Democratic Reform	Matthew Laird	316	1.38
Total valid votes		22,856	100.00
Total rejected ballots		155	0.68
Turnout		23,011	59.76
Source: Elections BC

B.C. General Election 2001: Burnaby North
Party	Candidate	Votes	%	±	Expenditures
Liberal	Richard T. Lee	11,062	54.37%		$38,089
NDP	Pietro Calendino	5,992	29.45%		$32,684
Green	Tom Hetherington	2,824	13.88%	–	$2,732
Marijuana	Dale Ware	466	2.30%		$394
Total valid votes		20,344	100.00%		
Total rejected ballots		102	0.50%		
Turnout		20,446	71.52%		

B.C. General Election 1996: Burnaby North
Party	Candidate	Votes	%	±	Expenditures
NDP	Pietro Calendino	8,926	45.47%		$43,634
Liberal	Richard T. Lee	8,160	41.57%		$42,888
Reform	Daniela Bosa	1,081	5.51%		
Progressive Democrat	Richard A.Y. Lee	976	4.97%	–	$1,099
Green	Tom Hetherington	395	2.01%	–	$930
Natural Law	Derek Nadeau	62	0.32%		$122
Libertarian	Carlo Nigro	31	0.16%		$100
Total valid votes		19,631	100.00%		
Total rejected ballots		180	0.91%		
Turnout		19,811	72.70%		

B.C. General Election 1991: Burnaby North
Party	Candidate	Votes	%	±	Expenditures
NDP	Barry Jones	9,809	48.43%		$28,085
Liberal	Gaetan C. Myre	6,337	31.29%		$1,895
Social Credit	Margaret Woods	3,833	18.92%	–	$31,779
Green	Jeani P. Lytle	194	0.96%	–	$711
Libertarian	Carlo Nigro	81	0.40%		
Total valid votes		20,254	100.00%		
Total rejected ballots		449	2.17%		
Turnout		20,703	75.24%		

== See also ==
- List of British Columbia provincial electoral districts
- Canadian provincial electoral districts
