= Tarion =

Consumer protection organization in Ontario, Canada

- Predecessor: Ontario New Home Warranty Program
- Founded: 1976 Ontario
- Number of locations: 1
- Area served: Ontario
- Website: tarion.com

Tarion, formerly known as the Ontario New Home Warranty Program, is a not-for-profit consumer protection organization established by the Government of Ontario in 1976 to administer the province’s new home warranty program as outlined in the Ontario New Home Warranties Plan Act. It is financed entirely by new home enrolment fees.

== Mission ==
By law, all new homes built in Ontario are provided with a warranty by the builder. Tarion’s role is to ensure that buyers of newly built homes in Ontario receive the coverage they are entitled to under their builder’s warranty.

Tarion’s responsibilities include:

- Protecting consumers if builders fail to fulfill their warranty obligations;
- Educating new home buyers and owners about their warranty rights and responsibilities;
- Providing the MyHome online portal for homeowners to manage their warranty and report defects;
- Facilitating the fair resolution of disputes over warranty coverage, repairs, or customer service;
- Assessing warranty claims through on-site inspection or alternative method of investigation;
- In cases where a builder fails to address a valid warranty claim, resolving the claim directly with the homeowner; and,
- Managing a guarantee fund to protect new home buyers out of which compensation for warranty claims is paid.

== Warranty Coverage for New Homes ==
New homes in Ontario come with the most comprehensive warranty coverage in Canada.

Pre-occupancy coverage includes deposit protection, compensation for delays, and financial loss protection for homes built on land already owned by a purchaser.

After occupancy, the warranty covers defects in the builder’s workmanship and materials. It lasts for a total of seven years and is divided into three coverage periods.

If a home is sold during its warranty coverage periods, the coverage remains on the home and is transferred to subsequent homeowners.

For condominiums, there is a separate warranty for shared areas (referred to as common elements) which is managed by the condominium corporation’s board of directors.

Warranty coverage is provided by builders and backstopped by Tarion.

== Regulation of Home Builders and Vendors ==
Effective February 1, 2021, Tarion's previous licensing responsibilities were transitioned to the Home Construction Regulatory Authority. The HCRA is responsible for regulating new home builders and vendors in the province.
