= Rohini Arora =

Canadian politician

Rohini Arora MLA
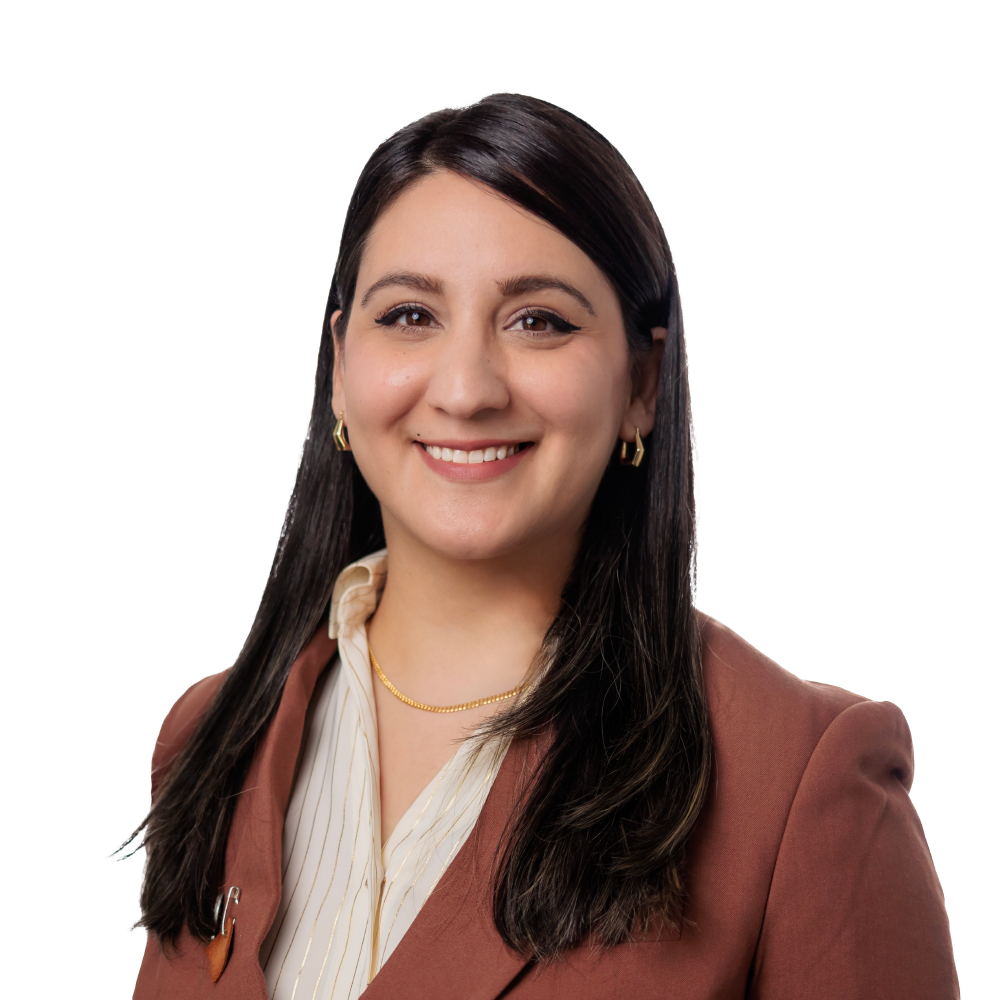
- Campaign portrait, 2024

Member of the British Columbia Legislative Assembly for Burnaby East
- Incumbent
- Assumed office October 19, 2024
- Preceded by: Katrina Chen

Personal details
- Party: BC NDP
- Occupation: Politician, labour organizer

Rohini "Reah" Arora MLA is a Canadian politician and labour organizer who has served as a member of the Legislative Assembly of British Columbia (MLA) representing the electoral district of Burnaby East since 2024. She is a member of the New Democratic Party.

== Early life and career ==
Arora was raised in the Westridge neighbourhood of Burnaby, British Columbia. Her parents owned and operated an independent pizza shop in the area, where she worked in her youth.

Arora previously worked in Alberta's Premier's Office. Prior to entering provincial politics, Arora was the director of organizing and campaigns at the BC Federation of Labour.

== Political career ==
Arora previously ran unsuccessfully for a seat on Burnaby's city council in the 2022 municipal election as a member of the Burnaby Citizens Association. She was just short of being elected: she came in 9th place, receiving 10,513 votes or 4.9 per cent of the popular vote, while the top 8 candidates were elected.

On June 9, 2024, Arora was nominated as the BC NDP candidate for the riding of Burnaby East, following an announcement in November 2023 that incumbent Katrina Chan would not seek re-election. She successfully contested the seat, beating Conservative candidate Simon Chandler by more than 2,000 votes.

In 2026, Arora endorsed Rob Ashton in that year's federal NDP leadership race.

== Electoral record ==
2024 British Columbia general election: Burnaby East
Party	Candidate	Votes	%	±%	Expenditures
New Democratic	Rohini Arora	10,490	51.85	−7.3	$47,116.87
Conservative	Simon Chandler	8,198	40.52	–	$17,963.73
Green	Tara Shushtarian	1,544	7.63	−5.5	$4,987.99
Total valid votes/expense limit		20,232	99.80	–	$71,700.08
Total rejected ballots		41	0.20	–	
Turnout		20,273	54.95	–	
Registered voters		36,896			
New Democratic notional hold		Swing		−23.9	
Source: Elections BC
