= Results of the 2026 British Columbia general election by riding =

- October 24, 2026
- All 93 seats in the Legislative Assembly; 47 seats needed for a majority

The following tables list by region the nominated candidates and results in the 2026 British Columbia general election.

Candidates had until October 3, 2026 to finalize their nomination applications to run in any of British Columbia's 93 provincial electoral districts in the general election. The candidate list was published the same day and finalized on October 14, after the withdrawal deadline.

== Number of candidates ==
Candidates for the 2026 British Columbia general election 93 seats in the Legislative Assembly of British Columbia
| Party | Leader | Candidates |
|---|---|---|
| Conservative | Lorne Doerkson (interim) | 93 |
| New Democratic | David Eby | 92 |
| Green | Emily Lowan | 73 |
| CentreBC | Elenore Sturko | 35 |
| OneBC | Dallas Brodie (interim) | 33 |
| Independent/Unaffiliated | —N/a | 13 |
| Libertarian | Alex Joehl | 4 |
| Communist | Robert Crooks | 4 |
| Christian Heritage | Christian McCay | 3 |
| CanWest | Wei Ping Chen | 2 |
| Freedom | Amrit Birring | 1 |

As at November 18, 2026

=== Candidate changes ===
On October 8, the Conservatives removed a candidate, Joachim Agou, in Victoria-Beacon Hill over social media posts, but he will remain on the ballot as it was after the candidate deadline. He was removed by the party, but did not withdraw as a candidate himself with Elections BC.

Also, on October 8, Elections BC updated the candidate list. It added a OneBC candidate, Jenny Yamagata in Burnaby North, after determining that "the candidate's nomination should have been accepted on October 3." The Green Party also had a candidate added, Anisha Sandhu, in Langley-Willowbrook after the nomination application was not processed correctly. In addition, unaffiliated candidate Timothy Webster withdrew in Vancouver-Yaletown, but will remain on the ballot as the ballot printing was nearly complete.

On October 10, Elections BC announced that Green Party candidate Greg DePaco withdrew as a candidate in Burnaby-New Westminster, but will remain on the ballot as the ballot printing was nearly complete.

On October 14, the deadline day for candidate withdrawals, Elections BC announced that unaffiliated candidate Gerry Lenoski (New Westminster-Coquitlam) and OneBC candidate Frederick Thiele (North Vancouver-Seymour) withdrew. With ballot printing complete, both will remain on the ballot.

On October 15, the Conservatives removed a candidate, Jordan Zheng McIntosh, in Vancouver-Strathcona over social media posts, but he will remain on the ballot as it was after the candidate withdrawal deadline.

=== Unaffiliated candidates ===
Four candidates were endorsed by OneBC but listed as unaffiliated due to "paperwork technicalities". They are Lee-Ann Bates (Port Coquitlam), Helen Scott (Peace River South), James Yaroshuk (Surrey-Guildford), and Denis R Hurtubise (Surrey South). Timothy Webster in Vancouver-Yaletown was also endorsed by the party, but withdrew as a candidate.

Clint Lambert will run as an unaffiliated candidate in Nechako Lakes as a self-described "blue independent." He originally sought the Conservative nomination in the riding but was not selected.

Jag Bhandari is running as an unaffiliated candidate in Surrey North. He is the leader of the registered political party, B.C. Vision that did not run any candidates.

== Abbreviations guide ==
Abbreviations of political affiliations used in these tables:

- NDP – British Columbia New Democratic Party
- Lib. – British Columbia Libertarian Party
- CWP – CanWest Party
- CBC – CentreBC
- CHP – Christian Heritage Party of British Columbia
- Comm. – Communist Party of British Columbia
- C – Conservative Party of British Columbia
- ind. – Independent
- FP – Freedom Party of British Columbia
- GP – Green Party of British Columbia
- 1BC – OneBC
- un. – Unaffiliated

== Candidates ==
- Names in **bold** are party leaders.
- † denotes incumbent MLAs who are not seeking re-election.
- ‡ denotes incumbent MLAs who are seeking re-election in a different riding.
- ~~strikethrough~~ indicates candidate withdrew with Elections BC after the candidate deadline.

All candidates listed below are officially registered with Elections BC, and listed by their name on the ballot.

=== Interior ===
==== Northern British Columbia ====
| Electoral district | Candidates | | | | | Incumbent |
| Electoral district | NDP | Conservative | Green | OneBC | Other | Incumbent |
|---|---|---|---|---|---|---|
| Bulkley Valley-Stikine | Frankie Abel 45.34% 3,872 | Sharon Hartwell 50.74% 4,333 | | | Ed Ewald (CHP) 3.33% 284 | Sharon Hartwell |
| Nechako Lakes | Jesse Gervais 23.06% 2,150 | Diane Black 63.86% 5,954 | | | Clint Lambert (un.) 13.08% 1,219 | John Rustad† |
| North Coast-Haida Gwaii | Tamara Davidson 61.44% 4,051 | Rodney Proskiw 28.83% 1,901 | Francis Racy 9.72% 641 | | | Tamara Davidson |
| Peace River North | | Curtis Whitford 85.75% 8,975 | | | Jordan Kealy (ind.) 14.25% 1,489 | Jordan Kealy (Note: Elected in 2024 as a Conservative candidate) |
| Peace River South | Marsha Rose Dufresne 15.37% 1,201 | Larry Neufeld 77.69% 6,070 | | | Helen Scott (un.) 6.94% 542 | Larry Neufeld |
| Skeena | Sarah Zimmerman 37.46% 4,106 | Claire Rattée 51.41% 5,634 | Nick Gottlieb 8.39% 919 | Larry Eugene Taylor 2.56% 281 | | Claire Rattée |

==== Prince George and the Cariboo ====
| Electoral district | Candidates | | | | Incumbent |
| Electoral district | NDP | Conservative | Green | OneBC | Incumbent |
|---|---|---|---|---|---|
| Cariboo-Chilcotin | Kathryn Askew 17.19% 3,365 | **Lorne Doerkson** 76.56% 14,988 | Douglas Gook 5.99% 1,173 | | **Lorne Doerkson** |
| Prince George-Mackenzie | Ian McMahon 23.69% 3,770 | Kiel Giddens 65.81% 10,473 | Teri Young 10.17% 1,618 | | Kiel Giddens |
| Prince George-North Cariboo | Denice Bardua 20.39% 3,637 | Sheldon Clare 69.74% 12,437 | Randy Thompson 9.61% 1,714 | | Sheldon Clare |
| Prince George-Valemount | Carol Bourque 29.71% 4,111 | Rosalyn Bird 50.34% 6,965 | Jodie Capling 11.96% 1,655 | Mitchell Lukoni 7.78% 1,076 | Rosalyn Bird (Note: Elected in 2024 as a Conservative candidate. Rejoined the Conservatives after dissolution.) |

==== The Kootenays ====
| Electoral district | Candidates | | | | | Incumbent |
| Electoral district | NDP | Conservative | CentreBC | Green | OneBC | Incumbent |
|---|---|---|---|---|---|---|
| Columbia River-Revelstoke | Andrea Dunlop 35.67% 6,349 | Scott McInnis 52.75% 9,390 | | Rana Nelson 11.40% 2,029 | | Scott McInnis |
| Kootenay Central | Brittny Anderson 39.71% 8,196 | Gordon Skulnec 36.48% 7,531 | | Nicole Charlwood 19.81% 4,089 | Hunter Corrigal 3.74% 772 | Brittny Anderson |
| Kootenay-Monashee | Steve Morissette 47.74% 8,862 | Warren Mirko 37.32% 6,929 | | Connie Larochelle 10.39% 1,928 | Stephen Hill 4.42% 820 | Steve Morissette |
| Kootenay-Rockies | Norma Blissett 27.34% 4,586 | Pete Davis 55.98% 9,389 | Paul Heywood 4.00% 671 | Keenan Dennehy 7.19% 1,205 | AJ Wolfe 5.29% 888 | Pete Davis |

==== Thompson, Okanagan, Shuswap and Boundary ====
| Electoral district | Candidates | | | | | | Incumbent |
| Electoral district | NDP | Conservative | CentreBC | Green | OneBC | Independent | Incumbent |
|---|---|---|---|---|---|---|---|
| Boundary-Similkameen | Roly Russell 40.62% 9,205 | Donegal Wilson 52.31% 11,855 | | | Keith Pomeroy 6.77% 1,534 | | Donegal Wilson |
| Fraser-Nicola | Jason Leboe 28.60% 4,965 | Tony Luck 58.14% 10,095 | | Patrick Michell 13.07% 2,270 | | | Tony Luck |
| Kamloops Centre | Mike Wisla 30.79% 7,220 | Peter Milobar 52.94% 12,414 | | Annelise Beach 11.34% 2,658 | Rocky McAfee 3.69% 865 | Thaelo Proctor 1.12% 263 | Peter Milobar |
| Kamloops-North Thompson | Kory Clark 28.98% 8,200 | Ward Stamer 64.44% 18,237 | | | Deborah Friesen 6.24% 1,767 | | Ward Stamer |
| Kelowna Centre | Loyal Wooldridge 47.98% 11,646 | Kristina Loewen 48.16% 11,689 | | | Bill Desrosiers 3.86% 937 | | Kristina Loewen |
| Kelowna-Lake Country-Coldstream | Binny Boparai 32.61% 7,853 | Pavneet Singh 47.70% 11,488 | | Carter Mochinski 8.23% 1,983 | Alexandra Wright 11.23% 2,705 | | Tara Armstrong† |
| Kelowna-Mission | Miriam Rycroft 27.99% 6,993 | Gavin Dew 58.33% 14,572 | | Saoirse MacKinnon 10.21% 2,550 | Abraham Nordine 3.30% 825 | | Gavin Dew |
| Penticton-Summerland | Tina Lee 41.35% 11,112 | Tracy St. Claire 45.26% 12,163 | | Bradley Sean Bartsch 8.02% 2,155 | Warren Hamm 5.25% 1,411 | | Amelia Boultbee† |
| Salmon Arm-Shuswap | Gloria Morgan 28.26% 8,372 | David L Williams 54.50% 16,144 | Denise Reimer 3.67% 1,086 | Jed Wiebe 8.31% 2,461 | Barbara Presch 5.07% 1,502 | | David Williams |
| Vernon-Lumby | Harwinder Sandhu 37.75% 9,920 | Kevin Acton 50.63% 13,304 | | Blair Visscher 7.01% 1,842 | Chantel Gibbs 4.48% 1,178 | | Harwinder Sandhu |
| West Kelowna-Peachland | George Morgan 29.42% 7,067 | Macklin McCall 62.47% 15,008 | | Adam Frank 7.89% 1,895 | | | Macklin McCall |

=== Greater Vancouver ===
==== Fraser Valley-Langley-Maple Ridge ====
| Electoral district | Candidates | | | | | | Incumbent |
| Electoral district | NDP | Conservative | CentreBC | Green | OneBC | Other | Incumbent |
|---|---|---|---|---|---|---|---|
| Abbotsford-Mission | Pam Alexis | Darryl Kropp | Lakhwinder Jhaj | | Virender Dass | Jeff Monds (Lib.) | Vacant (Note: Seat last held by Reann Gasper (Conservative)) |
| Abbotsford South | Leah Ballantyne | Bruce Banman | | | Robin Roy | | Bruce Banman |
| Abbotsford West | Jules Côté | Korky Neufeld | Gurpreet Chahal | | | | Korky Neufeld |
| Chilliwack-Cultus Lake | Kelli Paddon | A'aliya Warbus | | | | | Áʼa꞉líya Warbus |
| Chilliwack North | Adila Shaukat | Heather Maahs | Dan Grice | | | | Heather Maahs |
| Langley-Abbotsford | Erin Osborne | Harman Bhangu | | Melissa Snazell | Shelly Jan | **Alex Joehl** (Lib.) | Harman Bhangu |
| Langley-Walnut Grove | Holly Isaac | Misty Van Popta | Kyle Stevenson | Sam Meyer | | | Misty Van Popta |
| Langley-Willowbrook | Andrew Mercier | Jody Toor | | Anisha Sandhu | Shubham Joshi | | Jody Toor |
| Maple Ridge East | Hudson Campbell | Lawrence Mok | | Daniel Kite | | Chris Hatchwell (ind.) | Lawrence Mok |
| Maple Ridge-Pitt Meadows | Lisa Beare | Doug Morneau | Jordan Simmons | | Susan Einarsson | | Lisa Beare |

==== Surrey ====
| Electoral district | Candidates | | | | | | Incumbent |
| Electoral district | NDP | Conservative | CentreBC | Green | OneBC | Other | Incumbent |
|---|---|---|---|---|---|---|---|
| Surrey City Centre | Amna Shah | Zeeshan Wahla | Raman Sharma | | Oliver Wildfong | | Amna Shah |
| Surrey-Cloverdale | Stephen Dooley | Nicholas Cartmell | Sargy Chima | Pat McCutcheon | Travis Marchenski | | Elenore Sturko‡ |
| Surrey-Fleetwood | Jagrup Brar | Garry Purewal | Paul Brar | Tim Binnema | Carolyn Hofbauer | | Jagrup Brar |
| Surrey-Guildford | Garry Begg | Garry Thind | | Jodi Murphy | | James Yaroshuk (un.) | Garry Begg |
| Surrey-Newton | Jessie Sunner | Harj Dhaliwal | Harman Preet Singh | | | | Jessie Sunner |
| Surrey North | Sahib Thind | Mandeep Singh Dhaliwal | Parm Bhandol | Yudhbir Gill | Tanya Gupta | Jag Bhandari (un.) | Mandeep Dhaliwal |
| Surrey-Panorama | Jinny Sims | Bryan Tepper | Manav Manro | Nolen Scott | | | Bryan Tepper |
| Surrey-Serpentine River | Sikander Kang | Jessy Sahota | Judy Higginbotham | | Todd Holowchak | Errol Povah (FP) | Linda Hepner† |
| Surrey South | Parik Tahlan | Megan Knight | **Elenore Sturko** | Bill McConnell | | Denis R Hurtubise (un.) | Brent Chapman† |
| Surrey-White Rock | Darryl Walker | Trevor Halford | Waqas Rana | Christine Kinnie | Amanda James | Kevin Diakiw (ind.) | Trevor Halford |

==== Richmond and Delta ====
| Electoral district | Candidates | | | | | | Incumbent |
| Electoral district | NDP | Conservative | CentreBC | Green | OneBC | Other | Incumbent |
|---|---|---|---|---|---|---|---|
| Delta North | Todd Schierling | Monica Mohan | Kuldeep Rangi | | | | Ravi Kahlon† |
| Delta South | Jason McCormick | Ian Paton | | Skadi Green | Jim McMurtry | | Ian Paton |
| Richmond-Bridgeport | Linda Li | Teresa Wat | | | | | Teresa Wat |
| Richmond Centre | Henry Yao | Sacha Peter | | Calvin Dang | | Lawrence Chen (CWP) | Hon Chan† |
| Richmond-Queensborough | Dhar Grewal | Steve Kooner | | Luc Burns | | | Steve Kooner |
| Richmond-Steveston | Bruce Kong | Gordon Zhang | Barry Wosk | | | Robert Evans (ind.) | Kelly Greene† |
| Richmond-Steveston | Bruce Kong | Gordon Zhang | Barry Wosk | | | Keenan Yang (CWP) | Kelly Greene† |

==== Burnaby-New Westminster-Tri-Cities ====
| Electoral district | Candidates | | | | | | Incumbent |
| Electoral district | NDP | Conservative | CentreBC | Green | OneBC | Other | Incumbent |
|---|---|---|---|---|---|---|---|
| Burnaby Centre | Anne Kang | Joshua Domnich | Vikas Gautam | Shila Taheri | | | Anne Kang |
| Burnaby East | Rohini Reah Arora | Peter Si | | Javad Shushtarian | De Ding | | Rohini Arora |
| Burnaby-New Westminster | Raj Chouhan | Joe Latam | | ~~Greg DePaco~~ | | | Raj Chouhan |
| Burnaby North | Janet Routledge | Simon Chandler | | Maddy Kennedy-Parrott | Jenny Yamagata | | Janet Routledge |
| Burnaby South-Metrotown | Paul Choi | David Xie | | Bryan Fockler | Andrew Rose | | Paul Choi |
| Coquitlam-Burke Mountain | Jodie Wickens | Ryan Peterson | Kaden Mann | Valerie Morrison | | | Jodie Wickens |
| Coquitlam-Maillardville | Jennifer Blatherwick | Matt Liang | | Nicola Spurling | | | Jennifer Blatherwick |
| New Westminster-Coquitlam | Jennifer Whiteside | Michele Lau | | Maureen Curran | | ~~Gerry Lenoski~~ (un.) | Jennifer Whiteside |
| Port Coquitlam | Mike Farnworth | Keenan Adams | | Stephanie Hendy | | Lee-Ann Bates (un.) | Mike Farnworth |
| Port Coquitlam | Mike Farnworth | Keenan Adams | | Stephanie Hendy | | Lewis C. Dahlby (Lib.) | Mike Farnworth |
| Port Moody-Burquitlam | Rick Glumac | John McEwen | Freddy Rawji | Wei Chou | | | Rick Glumac |

==== Vancouver ====
| Electoral district | Candidates | | | | | | Incumbent |
| Electoral district | NDP | Conservative | CentreBC | Green | OneBC | Other | Incumbent |
|---|---|---|---|---|---|---|---|
| Vancouver-Fraserview | Aman Singh | Deep Sandhu | | Francoise Raunet | | | George Chow† |
| Vancouver-Hastings | Niki Sharma | Phyllis Tang | Christian Bosio | Kyra Philbert | | Kimball Cariou (Comm.) | Niki Sharma |
| Vancouver-Hastings | Niki Sharma | Phyllis Tang | Christian Bosio | Kyra Philbert | | Phil Webb (Lib.) | Niki Sharma |
| Vancouver-Kensington | Mable Elmore | Aron Lageri | | Adam Hawk | | | Mable Elmore |
| Vancouver-Langara | Sunita Dhir | Jaime Stein | Alan Beesley | John Atoyebi | | | Sunita Dhir |
| Vancouver-Little Mountain | Christine Boyle | Alex Muir | | Sarah MacLeod | | | Christine Boyle |
| Vancouver-Point Grey | **David Eby** | Alex McMillan | Michael Davis | Beatrice Sharpe | | | **David Eby** |
| Vancouver-Quilchena | Callista Ryan | Carson Binda | Petra Kuret | Douglas Courtemanche | **Dallas Brodie** | | **Dallas Brodie** |
| Vancouver-Renfrew | Adrian Dix | Tom Ikonomou | Lisa Prescott | Rebecca Haber | | | Adrian Dix |
| Vancouver-South Granville | Lara Honrado | Lisa Phillips | Colin Smith | Maria J Cruz | Salvatore Vetro | | Brenda Bailey† |
| Vancouver-Strathcona | Amanda Burrows | Jordan Zheng McIntosh (Note: Removed by the party after the candidate deadline, but will remain on the ballot.) | | Tanya Webking | | **Robert Crooks** (Comm.) | Vacant (Note: Seat last held by Joan Phillip (New Democratic)) |
| Vancouver-West End | Spencer Chandra Herbert | Dion Weisner | | Scott MacDonald | | | Spencer Chandra Herbert |
| Vancouver-Yaletown | Terry Yung | Margareta Dovgal | Sam Chandola | Priyan Samarakoone | | ~~Timothy Webster~~ (un.) | Terry Yung |

==== North Shore-Sea to Sky-Sunshine Coast ====
| Electoral district | Candidates | | | | | Incumbent |
| Electoral district | NDP | Conservative | CentreBC | Green | OneBC | Incumbent |
|---|---|---|---|---|---|---|
| North Vancouver-Lonsdale | Bowinn Ma | Trevor Withers | | Joshua A Singer Johnson | | Bowinn Ma |
| North Vancouver-Seymour | Susie Chant | Lynne Block | Lori Climenhaga | Ben Holt | ~~Frederick Thiele~~ | Susie Chant |
| Powell River-Sunshine Coast | Randene Neill | John Henderson | | Griffin Leonard Lea | | Randene Neill |
| West Vancouver-Capilano | Honieh Barzegari | Caroline Elliott | | Arwa Shurab | Naomi Chocyk | Lynne Block‡ |
| West Vancouver-Sea to Sky | Michelle Livaja | Ayla Dumais | Dan Wood | Jeremy Valeriote | | Jeremy Valeriote |

=== Vancouver Island ===
| Electoral district | Candidates | | | | | Incumbent |
| Electoral district | NDP | Conservative | CentreBC | Green | Other | Incumbent |
|---|---|---|---|---|---|---|
| Courtenay-Comox | Will Cole-Hamilton | Brennan Day | Jason Cook | Jay Van Oostdam | | Brennan Day |
| Cowichan Valley | Debra Toporowski | Bert Chen | | Justin Douglas | James Chumsa (Comm.) | Debra Toporowski |
| Ladysmith-Oceanside | Stephanie Higginson | Kris McNichol | | Charlene Smylie | | Stephanie Higginson |
| Mid Island-Pacific Rim | Josie Osborne | Joshua Dahling | | Gracie MacDonald | | Josie Osborne |
| Nanaimo-Gabriola Island | Sheila Malcolmson | Mark MacDonald | | Anna Mary McKenzie | | Sheila Malcolmson |
| Nanaimo-Lantzville | George Anderson | Kelsey Pringle | | Sharleen Weatherley | Pepper Saltman (Comm.) | George Anderson |
| North Island | Sara Lopez | Anna Kindy | | Benjamin Olsson | Richard Lambert (ind.) | Anna Kindy |

==== Greater Victoria ====
| Electoral district | Candidates | | | | | | Incumbent |
| Electoral district | NDP | Conservative | CentreBC | Green | OneBC | Other | Incumbent |
|---|---|---|---|---|---|---|---|
| Esquimalt-Colwood | Darlene Rotchford | Dave Johnston | Sid Tobias | Sidney Coles | | | Darlene Rotchford |
| Juan de Fuca-Malahat | Dana Lajeunesse | Mike Hicks | | David Evans | Shane Friesen | Jeff Brown (CHP) | Dana Lajeunesse |
| Langford-Highlands | Ravi Parmar | Cindy Scott | Sean Flynn | Christopher Moon | | **Christian McCay** (CHP) | Ravi Parmar |
| Langford-Highlands | Ravi Parmar | Cindy Scott | Sean Flynn | Christopher Moon | | Alex Thurlborn (ind.) | Ravi Parmar |
| Oak Bay-Gordon Head | Diana Gibson | Stan Sipos | Andrew Weaver | Andrew Appleton | | | Diana Gibson |
| Saanich North and the Islands | Kala Bryson | Ryan Windsor | Richard Smith | **Emily Lowan** | | | Rob Botterell† |
| Saanich South | Richard Zussman | Cathie Ounsted | | Lisa Lapointe | | | Lana Popham† |
| Victoria-Beacon Hill | Grace Lore | Joachim Agou (Note: Removed by the party after the candidate deadline, but will remain on the ballot.) | | Rajinder S. Sahota | | | Grace Lore |
| Victoria-Swan Lake | Nina Krieger | Tim Taylor | | Carolyn Howe | | | Nina Krieger |
