= List of NDP members of provincial and territorial assemblies =

This is a list of people who currently serve in one of the provincial or territorial legislative assemblies in Canada who are members of the New Democratic Party.

The NDP does not currently hold any seats in the Legislative Assemblies of Quebec, Prince Edward Island or New Brunswick. The territorial assemblies in Nunavut and the Northwest Territories, additionally, are non-partisan consensus government bodies.

== Alberta ==
The Alberta New Democrats currently hold 38 of 87 seats in the Legislative Assembly of Alberta, forming the official opposition.

- Naheed Nenshi, Party Leader and Leader of the Opposition
- Nagwan Al-Guneid
- Brooks Arcand-Paul
- Diana Batten
- Gurinder Brar
- Jodi Calahoo Stonehouse
- Joe Ceci
- Amanda Chapman
- Lorne Dach
- Jasvir Deol
- David Eggen
- Court Ellingson
- Sarah Elmeligi
- Janet Eremenko
- Kathleen Ganley
- Nicole Goehring
- Christina Gray
- Sharif Haji
- Julia Hayter
- Sarah Hoffman
- Rhiannon Hoyle
- Nathan Ip
- Janis Irwin
- Kyle Kasawski
- Samir Kayande
- Luanne Metz
- Rob Miyashiro
- Rakhi Pancholi
- Marie Renaud
- Irfan Sabir
- Marlin Schmidt
- David Shepherd
- Lori Sigurdson
- Parmeet Singh Boparai
- Gurtej Singh Brar
- Heather Sweet
- Lizette Tejada
- Peggy Wright

== British Columbia ==
The British Columbia New Democratic Party currently hold 47 (of the 93) seats in the Legislative Assembly of British Columbia, forming the government.

- David Eby, party leader and Premier of British Columbia
- Amelia Boultbee
- Brittny Anderson
- George Anderson
- Reah Arora
- Brenda Bailey
- Lisa Beare
- Garry Begg
- Jennifer Blatherwick
- Christine Boyle
- Jagrup Brar
- Spencer Chandra Herbert
- Susie Chant
- Paul Choi
- Raj Chouhan
- George Chow
- Sunita Dhir
- Adrian Dix
- Mable Elmore
- Mike Farnworth
- Diana Gibson
- Rick Glumac
- Kelly Greene
- Stephanie Higginson
- Ravi Kahlon
- Anne Kang
- Nina Krieger
- Dana Lajeunesse
- Grace Lore
- Bowinn Ma
- Sheila Malcolmson
- Steve Morissette
- Randene Neill
- Josie Osborne
- Ravi Parmar
- Lana Popham
- Darlene Rotchford
- Janet Routledge
- Harwinder Sandhu
- Amna Shah
- Niki Sharma
- Jessie Sunner
- Debra Toporowski
- Jennifer Whiteside
- Jodie Wickens
- Terry Yung

== Manitoba ==
The Manitoba New Democratic Party holds 34 (of the 57) seats in the Legislative Assembly of Manitoba, forming a majority government.

- Wab Kinew (Wabanakwut), Party leader and Premier of Manitoba
- Uzoma Asagwara
- Tyler Blashko
- Diljeet Brar
- Ian Bushie
- Renée Cable
- Jennifer Chen
- Carla Compton
- Shannon Corbett
- Billie Cross
- Jelynn Dela Cruz
- JD Devgan
- Nahanni Fontaine
- Jennifer Flett
- Nellie Kennedy
- Ron Kostyshyn
- Tom Lindsey
- Robert Loiselle
- Jim Maloway
- Malaya Marcelino
- Mike Moroz
- Jamie Moses
- Mike Moyes
- Lisa Naylor
- Logan Oxenham
- David Pankratz
- Eric Redhead
- Adrien Sala
- Mintu Sandhu
- Tracy Schmidt
- Rachelle Schott
- Glen Simard
- Bernadette Smith
- Matt Wiebe

== Newfoundland and Labrador ==
The New Democratic Party of Newfoundland and Labrador currently holds 2 of the 40 seats in the Newfoundland and Labrador House of Assembly, and is the third party.

- Jim Dinn (Party Leader)
- Sheilagh O'leary

== Nova Scotia ==
The Nova Scotia New Democratic Party currently holds 9 of the 56 seats in the Nova Scotia House of Assembly, and is the official opposition.

- Claudia Chender (Party leader) and Leader of the Official Opposition
- Kendra Coombes
- Krista Gallagher
- Lina Hamid
- Suzy Hansen
- Lisa Lachance
- Susan Leblanc
- Rod Wilson
- Paul Wozney

== Ontario ==
The Ontario New Democratic Party holds 27 of the 124 seats in the Legislative Assembly of Ontario, and is the official opposition.

- Marit Stiles, Party Leader and Leader of the Official Opposition
- Teresa Armstrong
- Jessica Bell
- Guy Bourgouin
- Jeff Burch
- Catherine Fife
- Jennifer French
- Wayne Gates
- France Gélinas
- Alexa Gilmour
- Chris Glover
- Lisa Gretzky
- Terence Kernaghan
- Robin Lennox
- Sol Mamakwa, Deputy Leader
- Catherine McKenney
- Chandra Pasma
- Tom Rakocevic
- Peggy Sattler
- Fatima Shaban
- Sandy Shaw
- Jennie Stevens
- Peter Tabuns
- John Vanthof
- Lise Vaugeois
- Jamie West
- Kristyn Wong-Tam

== Saskatchewan ==
The Saskatchewan New Democratic Party holds 26 of the 61 seats in the Legislative Assembly of Saskatchewan, forming the official opposition.

- Carla Beck Party Leader and Leader of the Opposition
- Brent Blakley
- Bhajan Brar
- Kim Breckner
- Noor Burki
- April ChiefCalf
- Jared Clarke
- Meara Conway
- Hugh Gordon
- Tajinder Grewal
- Sally Housser
- Keith Jorgenson
- Leroy Laliberte
- Matt Love
- Don McBean
- Jordan McPhail
- Vicki Mowat
- Joan Pratchler
- Erika Ritchie
- Jacqueline Roy
- Nicole Sarauer
- Brittney Senger
- Nathaniel Teed
- Darcy Warrington
- Trent Wotherspoon
- Aleana Young

== Yukon ==
The Yukon New Democratic Party holds 6 of the 21 seats in the Yukon Legislative Assembly, forming the Official opposition

- Kate White, party leader and Leader of the third party
- Carmen Gustafson
- Brent McDonald
- Linda Moen
- Lane Tredger
- Justin Ziegler

== See also ==
- List of New Democratic Party (Canada) members of parliament
