= Reni Masi =

Canadian politician

Renaldo Angelo "Reni" Masi

Member of the British Columbia Legislative Assembly for Delta North
- In office May 28, 1996 – May 17, 2005
- Preceded by: Norm Lortie
- Succeeded by: Guy Gentner

Personal details
- Born: August 12, 1933 Nanaimo, British Columbia, Canada
- Died: October 14, 2020 (aged 87) Surrey, British Columbia, Canada
- Party: BC Liberal

Renaldo Angelo "Reni" Masi (August 12, 1933 – October 14, 2020), son of Cyril and Mabel Masi, grew up in East Vancouver, where he attended Hastings and Templeton Secondary School before attending Normal School and completing his education at the University of British Columbia. He started teaching in Surrey, British Columbia in 1956 at Queen Elizabeth Secondary School. After a lifetime of community building, he turned his efforts to politics and served as a BC Liberal Member of the Legislative Assembly of British Columbia from 1996 to 2005, representing the riding of Delta North. He had previously been an unsuccessful candidate for the BC Liberal Party in the riding of Surrey in the 1966 provincial election.
