= Dovhal =

Dovhal (Ukrainian: Довгаль), Dovgal, or Douhal (Belarusian: Доўгаль) is a surname. Notable people with the surname include:

- Anatoliy Dovhal (born 1976), Ukrainian sprinter
- Margareta Dovgal, Canadian politician
- Pavel Dovgal (born 1975), Belarusian modern pentathlete
- Yuliya Dovhal (born 1983), Ukrainian weightlifter
