= List of New Democratic Party members of parliament =

This is a list of all the New Democratic Party members who have served in the Parliament of Canada. Members who are currently serving in the 44th Canadian Parliament are listed in bold.

== A ==
- Malcolm Allen (2008–2015)
- Vic Althouse (1980–1997)
- Douglas Anguish (1980–1984)
- Charlie Angus (2004–2025)
- Iain Angus (1984–1993)
- Hazen Argue (1961–1962)
- Niki Ashton (2008–2025)
- Alex Atamanenko (2006–2015)
- Robert Aubin (2011–2019)
- Chris Axworthy (1988–1999)
- Paulina Ayala (2011–2015)

== B ==
- Taylor Bachrach (2019–2025)
- Thomas Barnett (1962–1968, 1969–1974)
- Dave Barrett (1988–1993)
- Lisa Marie Barron (2021–2025)
- Catherine Bell (2006–2008)
- Les Benjamin (1968–1993)
- Tyrone Benskin (2011–2015)
- Sheri Benson (2015–2019)
- Thomas Berger (1962–1963)
- Dennis Bevington (2006–2015)
- Dawn Black (1988–1993, 2006–2009)
- Derek Blackburn (1971–1993)
- Bill Blaikie (1979–2008)
- Daniel Blaikie (2015–2024)
- Denis Blanchette (2011–2015)
- Lysane Blanchette-Lamothe (2011–2015)
- Rachel Blaney (2015–2025)
- Françoise Boivin (2011–2015)
- Charmaine Borg (2011–2015)
- **Alexandre Boulerice** (2011–present)
- Marjolaine Boutin-Sweet (2011–2019)
- Tarik Brahmi (2011–2015)
- Michael Breaugh (1990–1993)
- Andrew Brewin (1962–1979)
- John Brewin (1988–1993)
- Ed Broadbent (1968–1989, 2004–2006)
- Ruth Ellen Brosseau (2011–2019)
- John Burton (1968–1972)
- Steve Butland (1988–1993)

== C ==
- Colin Cameron (1962–1968)
- Richard Cannings (2015–2025)
- Guy Caron (2011–2019)
- Andrew Cash (2011–2015)
- Michael Cassidy (1984–1988)
- Chris Charlton (2006–2015)
- Sylvain Chicoine (2011–2015)
- Robert Chisholm (2011–2015)
- François Choquette (2011–2019)
- David Christopherson (2004–2019)
- Olivia Chow (2006–2014)
- Ryan Cleary (2011–2015)
- Joe Comartin (2000–2015)
- Laurel Collins (2019–2025)
- Raymond Côté (2011–2015)
- Jean Crowder (2004–2015)
- Nathan Cullen (2004–2019)

== D ==
- Leila Dance (2024–2025)
- **Don Davies** (2008–present)
- Libby Davies (1997–2015)
- Anne-Marie Day (2011–2015)
- Simon De Jong (1979–1997)
- Ian Deans (1980–1986)
- Bev Desjarlais (1997–2005)
- Blake Desjarlais (2021–2025)
- Marion Dewar (1987–1988)
- Paul Dewar (2006–2015)
- Pierre Dionne Labelle (2011–2015)
- Michelle Dockrill (1997–2000)
- Fin Donnelly (2009–2019)
- Rosane Doré Lefebvre (2011–2015)
- Tommy Douglas (1962–1968, 1969–1979)
- Matthew Dubé (2011–2019)
- Linda Duncan (2008–2019)
- Pierre-Luc Dusseault (2011–2019)
- Scott Duvall (2015–2021)

== E ==
- Gordon Earle (1997–2000)
- Phil Edmonston (1990–1993)
- Ernie Epp (1984–1988)

== F ==
- Fonse Faour (1978–1979)
- Norman Fawcett (1966–1968)
- Wally Firth (1973–1979)
- Douglas Fisher (1961–1965)
- Ron Fisher (1988–1993)
- Mylène Freeman (2011–2015)
- James Fulton (1979–1993)
- Raymond Funk (1988–1993)

== G ==
- Brian Gardiner (1988–1993)
- Randall Garrison (2011–2025)
- **Leah Gazan** (2019–present)
- Réjean Genest (2011–2015)
- Jonathan Genest-Jourdain (2011–2015)
- Bud Germa (1967–1968)
- Alain Giguère (2011–2015)
- John Gilbert (1966–1978)
- Alfred Gleave (1968–1974)
- Yvon Godin (1997–2015)
- Claude Gravelle (2008–2015)
- Matthew Green (2019–2025)
- Sadia Groguhé (2011–2015)
- Terry Grier (1973–1974)
- Dennis Gruending (1999–2000)

== H ==
- Cheryl Hardcastle (2015–2019)
- Randolph Harding (1968–1974)
- Louise Hardy (1997–2000)
- John Paul Harney (1973–1974)
- Dan Harris (2011–2015)
- Jack Harris (1987–1988, 2008–2015, 2019–2021)
- Ross Harvey (1988–1993)
- Sana Hassainia (2011–2015)
- Dan Heap (1981–1993)
- Herbert Herridge (1961–1968)
- Andrew Hogan (1974–1979)
- Stan Hovdebo (1979–1993)
- Frank Howard (1961–1974)
- William Howe (1963–1968)
- Carol Hughes (2008–2025)
- Lynn Hunter (1988–1993)
- Bruce Hyer (2008–2012; quit the party to become an independent, later joined the Greens)

== I ==
- Peter Ittinuar (1979–1982; crossed the floor to the Liberals)
- Lori Idlout (2021–2026; crossed the floor to the Liberals)

== J ==
- Pierre Jacob (2011–2015)
- Pauline Jewett (1979–1988)
- **Gord Johns** (2015–present)
- Georgina Jolibois (2015–2019)
- Peter Julian (2004–2025)

== K ==
- Jim Karpoff (1988–1993)
- Cyril Keeper (1980–1988)
- Matthew Kellway (2011–2015)
- William Knight (1971–1974)
- Stanley Knowles (1962–1984)
- Lyle Kristiansen (1980–1984, 1988–1993)
- **Jenny Kwan** (2015–present)

== L ==
- Rick Laliberte (1997–2000)
- Joy Langan (1988–1993)
- Steven W. Langdon (1984–1993)
- François Lapointe (2011–2015)
- Rod Laporte (1988–1993)
- Jean-François Larose (2011–2014; left the party to co-found Strength in Democracy)
- Alexandrine Latendresse (2011–2015)
- Hélène Laverdière (2011–2019)
- Jack Layton (2004–2011)
- Hélène LeBlanc (2011–2015)
- Stuart Leggatt (1973–1979)
- Megan Leslie (2008–2015)
- David Lewis (1962–1963, 1966–1974)
- Laverne Lewycky (1980–1984)
- Wendy Lill (1997–2004)
- Laurin Liu (2011–2015)

== M ==
- Alistair MacGregor (2015–2025)
- Grace MacInnis (1966–1974)
- Malcolm MacInnis (1962–1963)
- Lyle MacWilliam (1988–1993)
- Hoang Mai (2011–2015)
- Sheila Malcolmson (2015–2019)
- Jim Maloway (2008–2011)
- Peter Mancini (1997–2000)
- James Manly (1980–1988)
- Murdo Martin (1961–1968)
- Pat Martin (1997–2015)
- Tony Martin (2004–2011)
- Wayne Marston (2006–2015)
- Brian Masse (2002–2025)
- Barry Mather (1962–1974)
- Irene Mathyssen (2006–2019)
- Lindsay Mathyssen (2019–2025)
- Howard McCurdy (1984–1993)
- Lynn McDonald (1982–1988)
- Alexa McDonough (1997–2008)
- Audrey McLaughlin (1987–1997)
- **Heather McPherson** (2019–present)
- Élaine Michaud (2011–2015)
- Edward Miller (1979–1984)
- Margaret Mitchell (1979–1993)
- Christine Moore (2011–2019)
- Dany Morin (2011–2015)
- Isabelle Morin (2011–2015)
- Marc-André Morin (2011–2015)
- Marie-Claude Morin (2011–2015)
- Thomas Mulcair (2007–2018)
- Rodney Murphy (1979–1993)

== N ==
- Pierre Nantel (2011–2019; removed from NDP caucus following revelations he was in talks about joining another party)
- Peggy Nash (2006–2008, 2011–2015)
- Paddy Neale (1973–1974)
- Nels Nelson (1973–1974)
- Eli Nesdoly (1973–1974)
- Jamie Nicholls (2011–2015)
- José Nunez-Melo (2011–2015)
- Lorne Nystrom (1968–1993, 1997–2004)

== O ==
- Robert Ogle (1979–1984)
- Harry Olaussen (1973–1974)
- David Orlikow (1962–1988)

== P ==
- Annick Papillon (2011–2015)
- Sid Parker (1980–1984, 1988–1993)
- John Parry (1984–1988)
- Claude Patry (2011–2013; crossed the floor to the Bloc Québécois)
- Ève Péclet (2011–2015)
- Manon Perreault (2011–2014)
- Arnold Peters (1961–1979)
- François Pilon (2011–2015)
- Walter Pitman (1960–1962)
- Penny Priddy (2006–2008)
- Robert Prittie (1962–1968)
- Dick Proctor (1997–2004)

== Q ==
- Mumilaaq Qaqqaq (2019–2021)
- Anne Minh-Thu Quach (2011–2019)

== R ==
- Bob Rae (1978–1982)
- John Rafferty (2008–2015)
- Tracey Ramsey (2015–2019)
- Murray Rankin (2012–2019)
- Mathieu Ravignat (2011–2015)
- Francine Raynault (2011–2015)
- Erhart Regier (1961–1962)
- Nelson Riis (1980–2000)
- Svend Robinson (1979–2004)
- John Rodriguez (1973–1979, 1984–1993)
- Mark Rose (1968–1974, 1979–1983)
- Jean Rousseau (2011–2015)
- Doug Rowland (1970–1974)

== S ==
- Roméo Saganash (2011–2019)
- Lise St-Denis (2011–2012; crossed the floor to the Liberals)
- Max Saltsman (1964–1979)
- Cid Samson (1988–1993)
- Jasbir Sandhu (2011–2015)
- Brigitte Sansoucy (2015–2019)
- Terry Sargeant (1979–1984)
- Denise Savoie (2006–2012)
- Edward Schreyer (1966–1969)
- Craig Scott (2012–2015)
- Reid Scott (1962–1968)
- Djaouida Sellah (2011–2015)
- Bill Siksay (2004–2011)
- Jinny Sims (2011–2015)
- Jagmeet Singh (2019–2025)
- Rathika Sitsabaiesan (2011–2015)
- Raymond Skelly (1979–1993)
- Robert Skelly (1988–1993)
- John Skoberg (1968–1972)
- John Solomon (1994–2000)
- Wayne Stetski (2015–2019)
- Kennedy Stewart (2011–2018)
- Peter Stoffer (1997–2015)
- David Stupich (1988–1993)
- Mike Sullivan (2011–2015)
- Cyril Symes (1973–1979)

== T ==
- Len Taylor (1988–1997)
- Glenn Thibeault (2008–2014)
- Rod Thomson (1968–1972)
- Philip Toone (2011–2015)
- Robert Toupin (1986–1987)
- Jonathan Tremblay (2011–2015)
- Karine Trudel (2015–2019)
- Nycole Turmel (2011–2015)

== V ==
- Angela Vautour (1997–1999; crossed the floor to the Progressive Conservatives)

== W ==
- Ian Waddell (1979–1993)
- Judy Wasylycia-Leis (1997–2010)
- Arnold Webster (1962–1965)
- Erin Weir (2015–2018; expelled from the NDP caucus following a sexual harassment investigation)
- Jack Whittaker (1988–1993)
- Harold Winch (1961–1972)

== Y ==
- Neil Young (1980–1993)

== Z ==
- Bonita Zarrillo (2021–2025)

== See also ==
- List of articles about CCF/NDP members (by year first elected)
- List of NDP members of provincial and territorial assemblies
