= Scott Hamilton (politician) =

Canadian politician (born 1957)

Member of the British Columbia Legislative Assembly for Delta North
- In office May 14, 2013 – May 9, 2017
- Preceded by: Guy Gentner
- Succeeded by: Ravi Kahlon

Personal details
- Born: 1957 or 1958 (age 68–69)
- Party: BC Liberals

Scott Hamilton (born December 11, 1957) is a former Canadian politician, who was elected to the Legislative Assembly of British Columbia in the 2013 provincial election. He represented the electoral district of Delta North as a member of the British Columbia Liberal Party.

He served as Chair of the Select Standing Committee on Finance and Government Services, as well as several other committees of the Legislative Assembly.

== Delta City Council ==
Hamilton was first elected to Delta, British Columbia City Council in 2002 and was re-elected in 2005, 2008 and 2011. He served on several committees and commissions in his years on Delta Council. Most notably, he is responsible for advocating a new housing policy that resulted in a more progressive framework, and led to greater options for secondary housing opportunities in Delta.

He is currently the managing director for Quadrant Management Ltd, a property development and project management company that provides services to a variety of established industrial and commercial clients.

== Personal life ==
Hamilton and his wife Kristen have lived in North Delta since 1986. They have two grown daughters. Prior to his election to the 40th Legislative Assembly of British Columbia Hamilton was employed in the information technology sector.

== Electoral record ==
2017 British Columbia general election: Delta North
Party	Candidate	Votes	%	±%	Expenditures
New Democratic	Ravi Kahlon	11,465	48.83	+5.24	$48,460
Liberal	Scott Hamilton	9,319	39.69	−4.84	$65,204
Green	Jacquie Miller	2,697	11.48	+5.40	$2,920
Total valid votes		23,481	100.00	–	
Total rejected ballots		123	0.52	+0.10	
Turnout		23,604	64.99	+5.05	
Registered voters		36,319			
New Democratic gain from Liberal		Swing		+5.04	
Source: Elections BC

2013 British Columbia general election: Delta North
Party	Candidate	Votes	%
Liberal	Scott Hamilton	9,613	44.53
New Democratic	Sylvia Bishop	9,410	43.59
Green	Bill Marshall	1,312	6.08
Conservative	Tinku Parmar	983	4.55
Independent	John Shrek Shavluk	210	0.97
Communist	George Gidora	58	0.27
Total valid votes		21,586	100.00
Total rejected ballots		92	0.42
Turnout		21,678	59.94
Source: Elections BC
