= Chronic addiction substitution treatment =

Chronic addiction substitution treatment (CAST) is a policy adopted by Vancouver City Council in 2007 to reduce the harms of drug prohibition by providing substitutes to those with addictions.

== Overview ==
CAST attempts to reduce homelessness and crime by replacing illegal opiates with pharmaceutical heroin, hydromorphone or other substitutes.

== History ==
Vancouver has a long history of innovation in drug treatment. The first methadone maintenance treatment program was developed in Vancouver in 1959. For 15 years, Vancouver had the only supervised injection site in North America: Insite.

CAST was developed by Mayor Sam Sullivan as a result of his experience with the overdose crisis of the 1990s. He formed an organization called Inner Change to advocate for and fund-raise for a research trial called SALOME.

The policy was opposed by opposition Council members and narrowly passed with 6 to 5 votes even though it was unpopular with some in his core base and faced much opposition from the community.

The idea of giving heroin to heroin addicts is controversial. Nonetheless, many otherwise "conservative" sectors have endorsed the plan.

== Subsequent efforts ==
After Sullivan did not receive his party's endorsement to run for re-election, he focused on raising funds to implement the SALOME research trials. This proved that alternatives could be used for heroin. Despite the success of the research no program was instituted by the time the fentanyl crisis of late 2015 hit the province.
