= Guy Gentner =

Canadian politician (born 1955)

Member of the British Columbia Legislative Assembly for Delta North
- In office May 17, 2005 – May 14, 2013
- Preceded by: Reni Masi
- Succeeded by: Scott Hamilton

Personal details
- Born: 1954 or 1955 (age 70–71)
- Party: New Democrat

Guy Gentner (born 1955) MLA for Delta North in the Canadian province of British Columbia. He was elected to the Legislative Assembly in both the 2005 and 2009 general elections and previously served as a municipal councillor for Delta BC from 1999 to 2005.

He served on parliamentary committees, Crown Corporations (Vice-Chair) and Public Accounts, in addition to serving as Official Opposition Critic for various government functions: Crown Corporations and Agencies, Intergovernmental Affairs, Seniors and Public Health.

Early Life and Career: Born in Vancouver and raised in Richmond, B.C., Gentner moved to Delta and was active in his community for 35 years. As Vice President and research director of the fledgling Burns Bog Conservation Society, President of the North Delta Ratepayers Association, Member of the Mayor’s Task Force for Burns Bog preservation, and Greater Vancouver Regional Parks Committee (Metro Vancouver Regional Parks). Gentner was a contributory force towards the eventual public purchase of one of North America’s largest raised bogs.

Over his tenure in civic politics, Gentner served as Chair of Delta’s Parks, Recreation and Culture Commission, the Chair of Planning and was the founder and Chair of the internationally acclaimed Tour de Delta.

A recipient of the 2012 Queen’s Diamond Jubilee Medal for his contribution to community service, Gentner announced his retirement from public life on October 17, 2012 and did not run in the 2013 provincial election. He currently resides in the upper Sunshine Coast with his partner Shirley.
