= Vancouver-False Creek =

Defunct provincial electoral district in British Columbia, Canada

British Columbia electoral district
- Location in Vancouver

Defunct provincial electoral district
- Legislature: Legislative Assembly of British Columbia
- District created: 2008
- First contested: 2009

Demographics
- Population (2014): 57,261
- Area (km²): 6.71
- Census division: Metro Vancouver
- Census subdivision: Vancouver

Vancouver-False Creek is a former provincial electoral district in British Columbia, Canada, in use from 2009 to 2024. The riding took in most of Downtown Vancouver (the eastern part of Downtown is part of the Vancouver-Mount Pleasant riding) and the area around the north shore of False Creek, including Yaletown.

Established by the Electoral Districts Act, 2008, Vancouver-False Creek was first contested in the 2009 British Columbia general election.

Under the 2021 redistribution that took effect for the 2024 election, the riding was divided along False Creek. The portions north of False Creek, comprising the majority of the population, were redistributed to Vancouver-Yaletown, while most of the portions south of False Creek were redistributed to Vancouver-South Granville. A small segment east of Cambie Street, corresponding to the 2010 Olympic Village, was assigned to Vancouver-Little Mountain.

== Members of the Legislative Assembly ==
This riding has elected the following members of the Legislative Assembly:

Vancouver-False Creek
Assembly	Years	Member	Party
Created from Vancouver-Burrard, Vancouver-Fairview, Vancouver-Point Grey and Vancouver-Mount Pleasant
39th	2009–2013	Mary McNeil	Liberal
40th	2013–2017	Sam Sullivan	Liberal
41st	2017–2020	Sam Sullivan	Liberal
42nd	2020–2024	Brenda Bailey	New Democratic

== Election results ==
Graph of election results in Vancouver-False Creek (minor parties that never got 2% of the vote or didn't run consistently are omitted)

2020 British Columbia general election
Party	Candidate	Votes	%	±%	Expenditures
New Democratic	Brenda Bailey	11,484	46.77	+6.30	$47,212.32
Liberal	Sam Sullivan	9,217	37.54	−4.62	$85,582.35
Green	Maayan Kreitzman	3,108	12.66	−3.11	$9,079.62
Conservative	Erik Gretland	465	1.89	–	$1,126.02
Libertarian	Naomi Chocyk	280	1.14	+0.27	$0.00
Total valid votes		24,554	100.00	–	
Total rejected ballots		201	0.81	+0.08	
Turnout		24,755	51.06	−4.62	
Registered voters		48,482			
New Democratic gain from Liberal		Swing		+5.46	
Source: Elections BC

2018 British Columbia electoral reform referendum
Side	Votes	%
Proportional representation	8,572	51.33
First Past the Post	8,129	48.67
Total valid votes	16,701	100.0
Total rejected ballots	69	0.41
Source: Elections BC

2017 British Columbia general election
Party	Candidate	Votes	%	±%	Expenditures
Liberal	Sam Sullivan	10,370	42.16	−10.27	$51,086
New Democratic	Morgane Oger	9,955	40.47	+3.53	$30,096
Green	Bradley Darren Shende	3,880	15.77	+6.85	$1,575
Libertarian	Liz Jaluague	213	0.87	–	$0
Your Political Party	James Filippelli	91	0.37	+0	$561
Citizens First	Phillip James Ryan	1	0.1	–	$2950
Total valid votes		24,599	100.00	–	
Total rejected ballots		181	0.73	+0.18	
Turnout		24,780	55.68	+5.57	
Registered voters		44,508			
Source: Elections BC

2013 British Columbia general election
Party	Candidate	Votes	%	±%	Expenditures
Liberal	Sam Sullivan	11,228	52.21	−4.19	$114,796
New Democratic	Matt Toner	7,981	37.11	+9.58	$110,920
Green	Daniel Tseghay	1,928	8.96	−4.15	$1,050
No Affiliation	Ian James Tootill	199	0.93	–	$8,270
First	Sal Vetro	90	0.42	–	$3,207
Your Political Party	James Filippelli	81	0.37	–	$610
Total valid votes		21,507	100.0	–	
Total rejected ballots		118	0.55	−0.17	
Turnout		21,625	50.11	+1.96	
Eligible voters		43,157			
Source: Elections BC

2009 British Columbia general election
Party	Candidate	Votes	%	Expenditures
Liberal	Mary McNeil	9,223	56.40	$172,663
New Democratic	Jordan Parente	4,502	27.53	$25,219
Green	Damian Kettlewell	2,144	13.11	$15,033
Conservative	David Hutchinson	385	2.35	$7,280
Independent	Michael R. Halliday	73	0.45	$810
Refederation	Otto Grecz	27	0.16	$260
Total valid votes		16,354	100	
Total rejected ballots		118	0.72	
Turnout		16,472	48.15	
Registered voters		34,211		

== Student vote results ==
Student Vote Canada is a non-partisan program in Canada that holds mock elections in elementary and high schools alongside general elections (with the same candidates and same electoral system).

2020 British Columbia general election
Party	Candidate	Votes	%	±%
Green	Maayan Kreitzman	131	36.69	+16.16
New Democratic	Bradley Darren Shende	129	36.13	−0.40
Liberal	Sam Sullivan	77	21.57	+4.52
Libertarian	Naomi Chocyk	13	3.64	+1.53
Conservative	Erik Gretland	7	1.96	–
Total valid votes		357	100.0	–
Source: Student Vote Canada

2017 British Columbia general election
Party	Candidate	Votes	%	±%
New Democratic	Morgane Oger	225	36.53	−2.3
Green	Bradley Darren Shende	222	36.04	+18.2
Liberal	Sam Sullivan	105	17.05	−12.56
Your Political Party	James Filippelli	28	4.55	+4.06
Citizen's First	Phillip James Ryan	23	3.73	–
Libertarian	Liz Jaluague	13	2.11	–
Total valid votes		616	100.0	–
Source: Student Vote Canada

2013 British Columbia general election
Party	Candidate	Votes	%	±%
New Democratic	Matt Toner	80	38.83	+5.12
Liberal	Sam Sullivan	61	29.61	−3.34
Green	Daniel Tseghay	36	17.84	−1.1
First	Sal Vetrol	22	10.68	–
Independent	Ian James Tootill	6	2.91	–
Your Political Party	James Filippelli	1	0.49	–
Total valid votes		206	100.0	–
Source: Student Vote Canada

2009 British Columbia general election
Party	Candidate	Votes	%
New Democratic	Jordan Parente	89	33.71
Liberal	Mary McNeil	87	32.95
Green	Damian Kettlewell	50	18.94
Conservative	David Robert Hutchinson	33	12.5
Refederation	Otto Grecz	4	1.52
Independent	Michael R. Halliday	1	0.38
Total valid votes		264	100.0
Source: Student Vote Canada

== See also ==
- List of British Columbia provincial electoral districts
- Canadian provincial electoral districts
- Vancouver (electoral districts)
