= Tetra Society of North America =

Not-for-profit based in Vancouver, British Columbia

- Founded: 1987; 39 years ago
- Founder: Sam Sullivan
- Location: Vancouver, British Columbia
- Volunteers: 300
- Website: tetrasociety.org

Tetra Society of North America is a not-for-profit organization that provides volunteer engineers across Canada and the US to design and construct custom assistive devices for people with disabilities.

== History ==
The Tetra Society was founded in 1987 in Vancouver, British Columbia, by quadriplegic Sam Sullivan. It grew to more than 300 volunteers in 45 chapters across North America. It states that, over the years, its volunteers have completed 5,000 projects for people with disabilities.

== Tetra devices ==
Tetra volunteers create devices that “facilitate education, work and recreation” by tackling barriers to mobility, personal care and communications. Projects can relate to the home, workplace, leisure location, or anything in between, such as a wheelchair or motor vehicle. They were involved with adapting Sullivan's wheelchair when he became the first quadriplegic to accept an Olympic flag.

== Affiliated societies ==
The Sam Sullivan Disability Foundation consists of six affiliated societies:

- British Columbia Mobility Opportunities Society
- ConnecTra
- Disabled Independent Gardeners Association
- Adaptive Sailing Association of British Columbia
- Tetra Society of North America
- Vancouver Adapted Music Society

== See also ==
- TAD, a similar organisation in Australia
