= Vancouver Adapted Music Society =

Not-for-profit for musicians with disabilities

- Abbreviation: VAMS
- Founded: 1988; 38 years ago
- Founder: Sam Sullivan; Dave Symington
- Headquarters: Vancouver, British Columbia
- Website: https://vams.org

Vancouver Adapted Music Society (VAMS) is a not-for-profit organization that encourages, supports and promotes musicians with physical disabilities in Vancouver, British Columbia.

== Programs ==
VAMS operates programs for people with varied musical skills, including karaoke, sessions for learners and intermediate musicians; it operates a fully equipped music studio and promotes live concerts.

== Studio ==
Vancouver Adapted Music Society unveiled the country's most modern studio for musicians with disabilities in November 2008.

Located at Vancouver's G. F. Strong Centre, the studio is designed for people with a wide range of disabilities and musical capabilities. It features industry-standard equipment including a 64-bit iMac running Logic Pro 9 Studio, Apogee Ensemble audio interface and Euphonix MC control. In addition, it contains an M-Audio Axiom 49 keyboard, LTD electric guitar and bass, Takamine semi-acoustic guitar, Roland HD1 drum kit, a custom vintage tube microphone and a UA DCS remote pre amplifier. Both the iMac and Axiom 49 keyboard are height-adjustable to accommodate wheelchairs. A jouse (joystick-operated mouse which can be operated by the users’ mouth or chin) and a head mouse can be used to operate the equipment, and a MidiWing allows joystick programming of a keyboard.

Musicians can play instruments live or program sounds to build and record up to 256 track recordings, burning their completed work at 24bit/96 kHz DVD quality. The studio is also 5.1 capable with a full Blue Sky 5.1 monitoring system.

== Releases ==
VAMS members, aided by a variety of West Coast music scene names, released a music video in August 2009 to promote the capabilities of people with disabilities.

Produced by Shore 104 FM, it features VAMS members Jim Byrnes, Sylvi MacCormac and Rolf Kempf, joined by Ndidi Onukwulu, The Sojourners, Geoff Hicks, Wide Mouth Mason’s Shaun Verreault, Adaline, Daniel Wesley, Shane Turner and Jets Overhead in a cover of Bob Dylan’s "I Shall Be Released".

Jim Byrnes was quoted at the time as saying: “The theme of the song fits so well with the mandate VAMS lives by: music truly sets you free. We are all prisoners in some way. We have a physical disability or a mental disability or we’re afraid of something in our lives; but I think this project is an opportunity to show how this music, that we love so much, is a way to set us all free and allows us to be a part of the world that surrounds us.”

The video, shot on location around Vancouver, BC, can be seen on the VAMS website.

VAMS released a 15-track compilation CD, Strait Goods, in 2008.

In 2011, VAMS along with Shore 104, released their third music video together.

== History ==
VAMS was co-founded in 1988 by Vancouver, BC, musicians, Sam Sullivan and Dave Symington.

Both are quadriplegic. Sam, who played keyboards, and Dave, a drummer, wanted to tackle the barriers faced by musicians such as themselves – issues they had not come across before they became disabled as a result of sporting injuries.

Both musicians formed a band around this time, Spinal Chord, with guitarist Don Alder and bassist John Shepp which used music as a vehicle for raising awareness of disability issues. The band split in the mid-90s.

== Affiliated societies ==
The Sam Sullivan Disability Foundation comprises six affiliated societies:

- British Columbia Mobility Opportunities Society
- ConnecTra
- Disabled Independent Gardeners Association
- Disabled Sailing Association of British Columbia
- Tetra Society of North America
- Vancouver Adapted Music Society
