= Sam Sullivan Disability Foundation =

Non-profit organization in Vancouver, British Columbia

- Formation: June 1996; 30 years ago
- Founder: Sam Sullivan
- Headquarters: Vancouver, British Columbia
- Region served: British Columbia
- Board Chair: Mary-Jo Fetterly
- Website: https://disabilityfoundation.org
- Formerly called: Reach Disability Foundation

The Sam Sullivan Disability Foundation, based in Vancouver, British Columbia, administers six affiliated societies that provide services for people with physical disabilities.

== History ==
The Disability Foundation was formed by quadriplegic Sam Sullivan as the Reach Disability Foundation in June 1996 to provide services for people with physical disabilities. It was renamed in December 2001 following a legal challenge by a similarly named organization in Ottawa.

Sullivan resigned as executive director of the Disability Foundation and its affiliated organizations in 2005 when he was elected Mayor of Vancouver. Following his term of office, he was invited to sit on the board of directors in early 2009. The Disability Foundation board of directors has been chaired since its 1996 inception by Vancouver-based businessman Peter Jefferson.

In recognition of his service to people with disabilities, Sullivan was invested as a member of the Order of Canada in 2005 and is also a recipient of the Terry Fox Award and the Christopher and Dana Reeve Award.

On February 25, 2010, Sam Sullivan was announced Canada's ambassador for the 2010 Winter Paralympics, held in Vancouver and Whistler, British Columbia, between March 12 and March 21, 2010.

== Societies ==
The Sam Sullivan Disability Foundation comprises six affiliated societies:

- British Columbia Mobility Opportunities Society
- ConnecTra
- Adaptive Sailing Association of British Columbia
- Tetra Society of North America
- Vancouver Adapted Music Society
