= Adaptive Sailing Association of British Columbia =

Canadian not-for-profit organization

- Abbreviation: ASABC
- Founded: 1989; 37 years ago
- Founder: Sam Sullivan
- Headquarters: Vancouver, British Columbia
- Region served: British Columbia
- Website: https://asabc.org
- Formerly called: Disabled Sailing Association

Adaptive Sailing Association of British Columbia (ASABC), formerly called the Disabled Sailing Association, is a Canadian not-for-profit organization that enables people with disabilities to take part in a sport it promotes as "accessible and inclusive." It is located in Vancouver, BC, and has affiliated branches in Victoria, Chemainus and Kelowna.

== Programs ==
ASABC operates a fleet of eight specially designed Martin 16 sailboats from the Jericho Sailing Centre. These are designed to enable people with all levels of disability to enjoy sailing as a recreation activity or competitive high performance endeavor.

People with high-level disabilities, such as quadriplegia, have complete control of the vessel using sip-and-puff technology, with many sailing solo.

Each sailing season, ASABC reports that it hosts between 800 and 1,000 sailing experiences at Jericho and more from its affiliated branches. This ranges from leisure sailing to competitive racing.

The organization states sailing "promotes freedom and independence" for people with disabilities through the opportunity to take part in an exciting and challenging outdoor sport.

== History ==
Sam Sullivan, a quadriplegic, founded ASABC in 1989, using a British-made Sunbird dinghy. British Prime Minister Margaret Thatcher had originally presented the boat to Rick Hansen during Expo '86 in Vancouver, celebrating his Man in Motion world tour. Hansen subsequently presented the boat to Sullivan in order that people with disabilities could benefit from it.

During its first summer, people with a range of disabilities logged a total of 22 sails. The major breakthrough for the sport came in 1993 with the addition of (mouth-operated) sip n’ puff controls, which are connected to a power assist system. This enabled people with little or no arm movement to sail.

In 1995, the successor to the Sunbird was developed by Vancouver yacht designer Don Martin. The Martin 16 can be controlled conventionally, or by joystick, or through the sip n’ puff interface.

== Equipment ==
ASABC initially used the Sunbird, to which it added Sip n’ Puff controls in 1993.

However, the Sunbird's limitations could not be ignored, so Sullivan commissioned a new boat designed specifically for adaptive sailing. When Vancouver's Don Martin designed the Martin 16 in 1995, he included the requirements of power-assisted controls into his design brief.

The weighted keel makes it a very safe and stable boat, but it is also responsive. The addition of a portable, modular sip n’ puff system in 1998 – which can be dropped into a boat when needed – adds to the versatility of the vessel.

== Affiliated societies ==
The Sam Sullivan Disability Foundation consists of six affiliated societies:

- British Columbia Mobility Opportunities Society
- ConnecTra
- Disabled Independent Gardeners Association
- Adaptive Sailing Association of British Columbia
- Tetra Society of North America
- Vancouver Adapted Music Society
