= British Columbia Mobility Opportunities Society =

Nonprofit based in Vancouver, British Columbia

- Abbreviation: BCMOS
- Founded: 1985; 41 years ago
- Founder: Sam Sullivan
- Type: Non-profit organization
- Location: Vancouver, British Columbia
- Website: https://bcmos.org

British Columbia Mobility Opportunities Society (BCMOS) is a not-for-profit organization that enables people with disabilities in Vancouver, Canada, to explore the outdoors. Activities include hiking and gliding.

== Activities ==
BCMOS was founded by quadriplegic Sam Sullivan in 1985 to make it possible for people with disabilities to access the outdoors. Activities range from day hikes to challenging treks.

Since 1995, the centerpiece of BCMOS programs has been the TrailRider, a specially designed wilderness access vehicle. With one wheel, and "sherpas" back and front, the TrailRider has been likened to a cross between a wheelbarrow and a rickshaw. Yet it has twice summited Kilimanjaro, twice reached Everest Base Camp, and enabled thousands of day trips and family outings.

BCMOS runs a seasonal hiking program, offers gliding and makes TrailRiders available for rental, year round. In addition, more than 30 other programs across Canada and the US now make use of the TrailRider.

== History ==
BCMOS was originally formed as Disabled Ultralighters of Vancouver (DUVS) to enable people with disabilities to fly. However, the fledgling group ran into insurance and logistical difficulties.

Sullivan decided to replicate the success of his accessible sailing group, Disabled Sailing Association of BC, but on dry land and so in 1992 set about making the wilderness accessible. The result was the development of an adapted golf cart - a project that took more than a year to complete but proved woefully unsuited for use on trails and in the area's parks.

Sullivan asked a volunteer from another of his non-profit groups to re-think the access vehicle. Paul Cermak, the first volunteer with the Tetra Society of North America, came up with a more practical design. His first prototype of the TrailRider came together from a folding aluminum garden chair, some handles and a pneumatic tire. It was enough to prove the concept and in 1995 the first TrailRider was manufactured.

In 2007, things turned full circle with BCMOS opening a gliding program. Operating out of Hope Airfield and run in conjunction with Vancouver Soaring Association, this offers flights of between 45 minutes and one-hours' duration to people with disabilities.

== Affiliated societies ==
The Sam Sullivan Disability Foundation comprises six affiliated societies:

- BC Mobility Opportunities Society
- ConnecTra
- Disabled Independent Gardeners Association
- Disabled Sailing Association of British Columbia
- Tetra Society of North America
- Vancouver Adapted Music Society
