= Surrey City Centre (electoral district) =

Provincial electoral district in British Columbia, Canada

British Columbia electoral district
- Interactive map of riding boundaries

Provincial electoral district
- Legislature: Legislative Assembly of British Columbia
MLA
Zeeshan Wahla
Conservative
- District created: 2023
- First contested: 2024
- Last contested: 2026

Demographics
- Population (2021): 57,566
- Area (km²): 17
- Pop. density (per km²): 3,386.2
- Census division: Metro Vancouver
- Census subdivision: Surrey (part)

Surrey City Centre is a provincial electoral district in British Columbia that has been represented in the Legislative Assembly of British Columbia since 2024.

Created under the 2021 British Columbia electoral redistribution, the riding was first contested in the 2024 general election. It was created out of parts of Surrey-Green Timbers, Surrey-Guildford and Surrey-Whalley.

== Demographics ==
Population, 2021	57,566
Area (km^{2})	17
Pop. Density (people per km^{2})	3,386
Source: BC Electoral Boundaries Commission

== Geography ==
The district corresponds to the Surrey City Centre core of the community of Whalley. Its southern boundary is 96 Avenue, with the included areas centered on the King George Boulevard corridor.

== Members of the Legislative Assembly ==
This riding has elected the following members of the Legislative Assembly:

Assembly	Years	Member	Party
Surrey City Centre; Riding created from Surrey-Green Timbers, Surrey-Guildford and Surrey-Whalley
43rd	2024–2026	Amna Shah	New Democratic
44th	2026–present	Zeeshan Wahla	Conservative

== Election results ==
2026 British Columbia general election
Party	Candidate	Votes	%	±%	Expenditures
Conservative	Zeeshan Wahla	5,713	47.34	+1.79	
New Democratic	Amna Shah	5,318	44.07	-2.17	
OneBC	Oliver Wildfong	583	4.83		
CentreBC	Raman Sharma	418	3.46		
Total valid votes		12,032	99.71		
Total rejected ballots		35	0.29		
Turnout					
Registered voters					
Conservative gain from New Democratic		Swing		+1.98	
Source: Elections BC

2024 British Columbia general election
Party	Candidate	Votes	%	±%	Expenditures
New Democratic	Amna Shah	6,439	46.24	-23.3	
Conservative	Zeeshan Wahla	6,343	45.55		
Green	Colin Boyd	845	6.07		
Independent	Saeed Naguib	155	1.11		
Communist	Ryan Abbott	143	1.03		
Total valid votes			–		
Total rejected ballots					
Turnout					
Registered voters					
New Democratic hold		Swing		–34.41	
Source: Elections BC

2020 provincial election redistributed results
Party	%
New Democratic	69.5
Liberal	28.4
Others	2.1

== See also ==
- List of British Columbia provincial electoral districts
- Canadian provincial electoral districts
