= Delta North =

Provincial electoral district in British Columbia, Canada

British Columbia electoral district
- Interactive map of riding boundaries

Provincial electoral district
- Legislature: Legislative Assembly of British Columbia
MLA
Monica Mohan
Conservative
- First contested: 1991
- Last contested: 2026

Demographics
- Population (2021): 58,813
- Area (km²): 28
- Pop. density (per km²): 2,100.5
- Census division: Metro Vancouver
- Census subdivision: Delta (part)

Delta North is a provincial electoral district for the Legislative Assembly of British Columbia.

Established under the 1991 electoral redistribution, the district was first contested in the 1991 general election. It was created following the division of the previous two-member district of Delta.

== Demographics ==
Population, 2021	58,813
Area (km^{2})	28
Pop. density (people per km^{2})	2,100
Source: BC Electoral Boundaries Commission

== Geography ==
Located in Delta, the district comprises the northeastern part of the city, including North Delta and Annacis Island. It is bordered by the Fraser River to the north and Highway 91 to the west.

== Members of the Legislative Assembly ==
This riding has elected the following members of the Legislative Assembly:

Assembly	Years	Member	Party
Delta North; Riding created from Delta
35th	1991–1996	Norm Lortie	New Democratic
36th	1996–2001	Reni Masi	Liberal
37th	2001–2005	Reni Masi	Liberal
38th	2005–2009	Guy Gentner	New Democratic
39th	2009–2013	Guy Gentner	New Democratic
40th	2013–2017	Scott Hamilton	Liberal
41st	2017–2020	Ravi Kahlon	New Democratic
42nd	2020–2024	Ravi Kahlon	New Democratic
43rd	2024–2026	Ravi Kahlon	New Democratic
44th	2026–present	Monica Mohan	Conservative

== Election results ==
2026 British Columbia general election
Party	Candidate	Votes	%	±%	Expenditures
Conservative	Monica Mohan	9,796	53.42	+13.20	
New Democratic	Todd Schierling	7,425	40.49	-12.24	
CentreBC	Kuldeep Rangi	1,062	5.79	-	
Total valid votes		18,283	99.70		
Total rejected ballots		55	0.30		
Turnout					
Registered voters					
Conservative gain from New Democratic		Swing		+12.72	
Source: Elections BC

2024 British Columbia general election
Party	Candidate	Votes	%	±%	Expenditures
New Democratic	Ravi Kahlon	10,988	52.73	-4.5	$56,496.69
Conservative	Raj Veauli	8,381	40.22	–	$62,045.72
Green	Nick Dickinson-Wilde	1,292	6.20	-3.4	$0.00
Freedom	Manqoosh Khan	177	0.85	–	$0.00
Total valid votes/expense limit		20,838	99.82	–	$71,700.08
Total rejected ballots		38	0.18	–	
Turnout		20,876	57.89	–	
Registered voters		36,062			
New Democratic notional hold		Swing		−22.3	
Source: Elections BC

2020 provincial election redistributed results
Party	%
New Democratic	57.2
Liberal	33.2
Green	9.6

2020 British Columbia general election
Party	Candidate	Votes	%	±%	Expenditures
New Democratic	Ravi Kahlon	12,215	56.78	+7.95	$53,820.55
Liberal	Jet Sunner	7,179	33.37	−6.32	$41,134.08
Green	Neema Manral	2,120	9.85	−1.64	$9,864.40
Total valid votes		21,514	100.00	–	
Total rejected ballots					
Turnout					
Registered voters					
Source: Elections BC

2017 British Columbia general election
Party	Candidate	Votes	%	±%	Expenditures
New Democratic	Ravi Kahlon	11,465	48.83	+5.24	$48,460
Liberal	Scott Hamilton	9,319	39.69	−4.84	$65,204
Green	Jacquie Miller	2,697	11.48	+5.40	$2,920
Total valid votes		23,481	100.00	–	
Total rejected ballots		123	0.52	+0.10	
Turnout		23,604	64.99	+5.05	
Registered voters		36,319			
New Democratic gain from Liberal		Swing		+5.04	
Source: Elections BC

2013 British Columbia general election
Party	Candidate	Votes	%
Liberal	Scott Hamilton	9,613	44.53
New Democratic	Sylvia Bishop	9,410	43.59
Green	Bill Marshall	1,312	6.08
Conservative	Tinku Parmar	983	4.55
Independent	John Shrek Shavluk	210	0.97
Communist	George Gidora	58	0.27
Total valid votes		21,586	100.00
Total rejected ballots		92	0.42
Turnout		21,678	59.94
Source: Elections BC

B.C. General Election 2009 Delta North
Party	Candidate	Votes	%	±	Expenditures
New Democratic	Guy Gentner	10,381	50.48%		$57,477
Liberal	Jeannie Kanakos	8,490	41.28%		$121,151
Green	Matthew Laine	938	4.56%	–	$350
Conservative	Marc McPherson	756	3.68%		$4,221
Total Valid Votes		20,565	100%		
Total Rejected Ballots		88	0.43%		
Turnout		20,653	59.26%		

B.C. General Election 2005 Delta North
Party	Candidate	Votes	%	±	Expenditures
NDP	Guy Gentner	10,481	47.46%		$52,677
Liberal	Jeannie Kanakos	9,480	42.93%		$75,172
Green	John Hague	1,711	7.75%	–	$3,097
Marijuana	John Shavluk	224	1.01%		$100
British Columbia Party	David Andrew Wright	187	0.85%	–	$325
Total Valid Votes		22,083	100%		
Total Rejected Ballots		124	0.56%		
Turnout		22,207	64.24%		

B.C. General Election 2001: Delta North
Party	Candidate	Votes	%	±	Expenditures
Liberal	Reni Masi	11,919	60.54%		$40,373
NDP	Norm Lortie	3,734	18.97%		$3,744
Green	John Hague	2,504	12.72%	–	$1,148
Unity	Dario Todrovic	987	5.01%		$1,595
Marijuana	Iain Gilfillan	543	2.76%		$394
Total Valid Votes		19,687	100.00%		
Total Rejected Ballots		84	0.43%		
Turnout		19,771	72.65%		

B.C. General Election 1996: Delta North
Party	Candidate	Votes	%	±	Expenditures
Liberal	Reni Masi	9,305	45.50%		$44,970
NDP	Norm Lortie	8,657	42.33%		$24,416
Progressive Democrat	Ross Pike	1,385	6.77%	–	$1,340
Reform	Gurmant Grewal	755	3.69%		$12,825
Green	Angela Chiotakos	347	1.70%	–	$100
Total Valid Votes		20,449	100.00%		
Total Rejected Ballots		120	0.58%		
Turnout		20,569	74.88%		

B.C. General Election 1991: Delta North
Party	Candidate	Votes	%	±	Expenditures
NDP	Norm Lortie	8,068	38.65		$29,903
Liberal	Murray MacLeod	7,306	35.00		$5,342
Social Credit	Rick Green	5,252	25.16	–	$39,543
Family Coalition	Paul C. Formby	138	0.66	–	$1,556
Independent	Benjamin B. Wolfe	72	0.34		$57
Western Canada Concept	Arley Arlington M. Frey	40	0.19		
Total Valid Votes		20,876	100.00%		
Total Rejected Ballots		387	1.82%		
Turnout		21,263	78.60%		

== See also ==
- List of British Columbia provincial electoral districts
- Canadian provincial electoral districts
- Delta North Senatorial District, Nigeria.
