= Burnaby South-Metrotown =

Provincial electoral district in British Columbia, Canada

British Columbia electoral district
- Location in Burnaby

Provincial electoral district
- Legislature: Legislative Assembly of British Columbia
MLA
David Xie
Conservative
- District created: 2023
- First contested: 2024
- Last contested: 2026

Demographics
- Census division: Metro Vancouver
- Census subdivision: Burnaby

Burnaby South-Metrotown is a provincial electoral district for the Legislative Assembly of British Columbia, Canada. Created under the 2021 British Columbia electoral redistribution, the riding was first contested in the 2024 British Columbia general election. It was created out of parts of Burnaby-Edmonds and Burnaby-Deer Lake.

== Geography ==
The district takes in portions of the city of Burnaby south of Kingsway and west of Griffths Drive, with its name referencing the Metrotown town centre.

== Members of the Legislative Assembly ==
Assembly	Years	Member	Party
Burnaby South-Metrotown; Riding created from Burnaby-Deer Lake and Burnaby-Edmonds
43rd	2024–2026	Paul Choi	New Democratic
44th	2026–present	David Xie	Conservative

== Election results ==
2026 British Columbia general election
** Preliminary results — Not yet official **
Party	Candidate	Votes	%	±%	Expenditures
New Democratic	Paul Choi	5,811	44.21	-5.12	
Conservative	David Xie	5,745	43.71	+2.12	
Green	Bryan Fockler	1,151	8.76	+2.50	
OneBC	Andrew Rose	379	2.88	-	
Total valid votes		13,086	99.56		
Total rejected ballots		58	0.44		
Turnout					
Registered voters					
New Democratic hold		Swing		-3.62	
Source: Elections BC

2024 British Columbia general election
Party	Candidate	Votes	%	±%	Expenditures
New Democratic	Paul Choi	7,560	49.33	−9.9	$62,573.38
Conservative	Han Lee	6,373	41.59	–	$17,345.46
Green	Carrie McLaren	960	6.26	−6.1	$227.67
Unaffiliated	Meiling Chia	290	1.89	–	$13,716.03
Independent	MichaelAngelo Abc RobinHood	142	0.93	–	$1,395.00
Total valid votes/expense limit		15,325	99.79	–	$71,700.08
Total rejected ballots		32	0.21	–	
Turnout		15,357	48.85	–	
Registered voters		31,434			
New Democratic notional hold		Swing		−25.7	
Source: Elections BC

2020 provincial election redistributed results
Party	%
New Democratic	59.2
Liberal	28.4
Green	12.4

== See also ==
- List of British Columbia provincial electoral districts
- Canadian provincial electoral districts
