= Monica Mohan (politician) =

Canadian politician

Monica Mohan MLA

Member of the British Columbia Legislative Assembly for Delta North
- Incumbent
- Assumed office October 24, 2026
- Preceded by: Ravi Kahlon

Personal details
- Party: BC Conservatives

Monica Mohan MLA is a Canadian politician who is the Member of the British Columbia Legislative Assembly for Delta North since 2026.

Mohan is a practicing lawyer and a graduate of Pennsylvania State University. She is of Indian and Fijian descent. Mohan previously worked in civilian roles with the Vancouver Police Department and Guelph Police Service as well as a sexual assault counsellor.

Following her election, Mohan was made Deputy Chair of the committee of the whole in the Legislative Assembly.
