= David Xie =

Canadian politician

David Xie MLA

Member of the British Columbia Legislative Assembly for Burnaby South-Metrotown
- Incumbent
- Assumed office October 24, 2026
- Preceded by: Paul Choi

Personal details
- Party: BC Conservative
- Other political affiliations: New Burnaby (municipal)

Davie Xie MLA is a Canadian politician who has served as a member of the Legislative Assembly of British Columbia (MLA) representing the electoral district of Burnaby South-Metrotown since 2026. He is a member of the Conservative Party.

== Political career ==
In September 2026, Xie ran as a candidate for New Burnaby in the 2026 British Columbia municipal elections, but failed to be elected. That same month, he became the Conservative Party of British Columbia nominee in the 2026 general election, running in the electoral district of Burnaby South-Metrotown. He went on to narrowly defeat incumbent New Democratic MLA Paul Choi, who was originally thought to have won the riding with preliminary results on election night.

A graduate of the University of British Columbia, Xie has a background in hospitality, having worked for Joey and Fairmont Hotels & Resorts before becoming a recruiter for Robert Half and Rolls-Royce. Prior to his election as MLA, he wrote to the Legislative Assembly in 2026, calling on the 2027 budget to prioritize improving public services in Burnaby, and to require enhanced safety standards and community-impact planning for supportive housing projects in the city.

== Electoral history ==
2026 British Columbia general election: Burnaby South-Metrotown
** Preliminary results — Not yet official **
Party	Candidate	Votes	%	±%	Expenditures
Conservative	David Xie	6,570	44.50	+2.91	
New Democratic	Paul Choi	6,506	44.07	−5.26	
Green	Bryan Fockler	1,268	8.59	+2.33	
OneBC	Andrew Rose	419	2.84	—	
Total valid votes		14,763	99.57		
Total rejected ballots		63	0.43		
Turnout		14,826			
Registered voters					
Conservative gain from New Democratic		Swing		+4.09	
Source: Elections BC
