= Vancouver-Yaletown =

Provincial electoral district in British Columbia, Canada

British Columbia electoral district
- Interactive map of riding boundaries

Provincial electoral district
- Legislature: Legislative Assembly of British Columbia
MLA
Margareta Dovgal
Conservative
- District created: 2023
- First contested: 2024
- Last contested: 2026

Demographics
- Population (2021): 55,307
- Area (km²): 4
- Pop. density (per km²): 13,826.8
- Census division: Metro Vancouver
- Census subdivision: Vancouver (part)

Vancouver-Yaletown is a provincial electoral district for the Legislative Assembly of British Columbia.

Created under the 2021 British Columbia electoral redistribution, the riding was first contested in the 2024 British Columbia general election. It was created from parts of Vancouver-False Creek and Vancouver-Mount Pleasant.

== Demographics ==
Population, 2021	55,307
Area (km^{2})	4
Pop. Density (people per km^{2})	13,826
Source: BC Electoral Boundaries Commission

== Geography ==
The district comprises the portions of Downtown Vancouver east of Burrard Street, taking its name from the neighbourhood of Yaletown. Yaletown is the second-wealthiest neighbourhood of Vancouver, after Shaughnessy The riding is adjacent to Vancouver's infamous Downtown Eastside area, widely known as the poorest neighbourhood in Canada, which is located in next-door Vancouver-Strathcona.

== Members of the Legislative Assembly ==
This riding has elected the following members of the Legislative Assembly:

Assembly	Years	Member	Party
Vancouver-Yaletown; Riding created from Vancouver-False Creek and Vancouver-Mount Pleasant
43rd	2024–2026	Terry Yung	New Democratic
44th	2026–present	Margareta Dovgal	Conservative

== Election results ==
2026 British Columbia general election
The 2026 general election will be held on October 24.
Party	Candidate	Votes	%	±%	Expenditures
New Democratic	Terry Yung				
Conservative	Margareta Dovgal				
Green	Priyan Samarakoone				
CentreBC	Sam Chandola			–	
Total valid votes					
Total rejected ballots					
Turnout					
Registered voters					
Source: Elections BC

2024 British Columbia general election
Party	Candidate	Votes	%	±%	Expenditures
New Democratic	Terry Yung	9,018	49.8%	+9.6	
Conservative	Melissa de Genova	7,858	43.4%	+41.3	
Green	Dana-Lyn Mackenzie	1,248	6.9%	-4.3	
Total valid votes		18,124	–		
Total rejected ballots					
Turnout					
Registered voters					
New Democratic notional gain from BC United		Swing		–	
Source: Elections BC

2020 provincial election redistributed results
Party	%
Liberal	45.0
New Democratic	40.2
Green	11.2
Conservative	2.1

== See also ==
- List of British Columbia provincial electoral districts
- Canadian provincial electoral districts
