= Ravi Kahlon =

Canadian politician and athlete (born 1979)

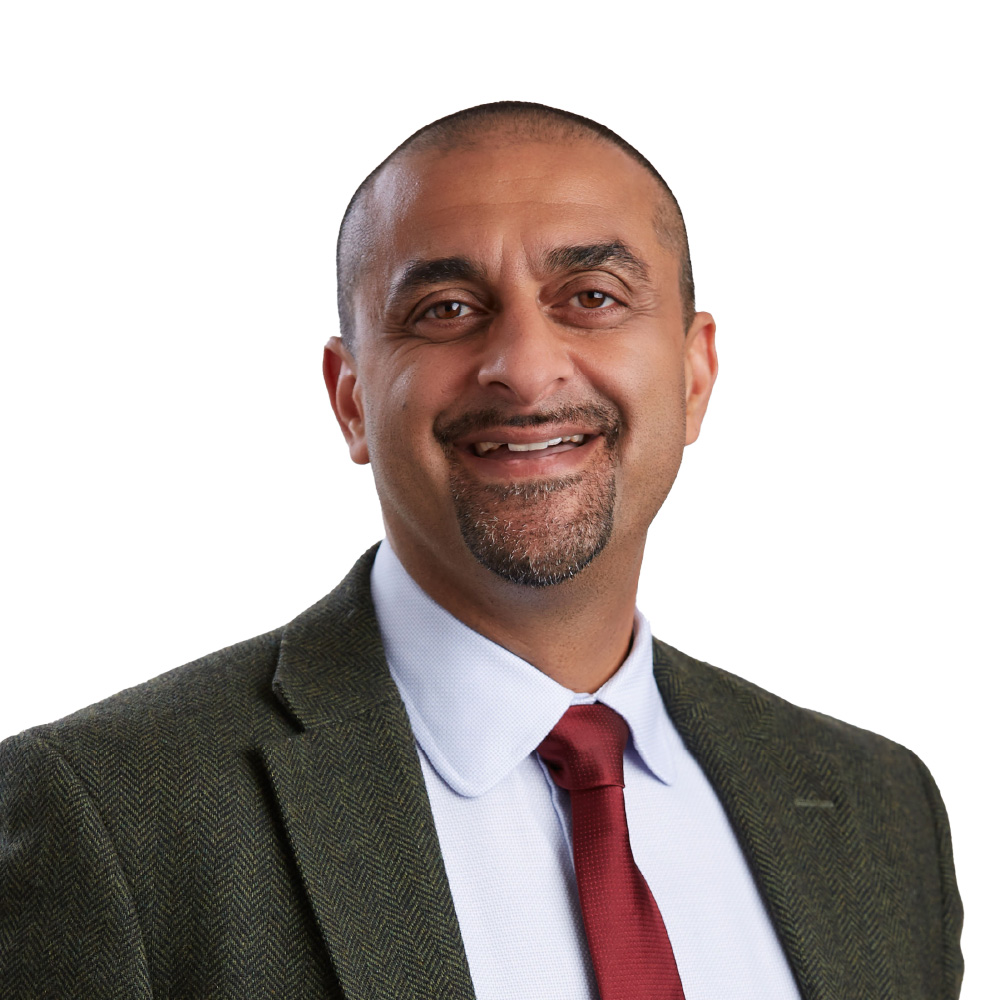
- Campaign portrait, 2024

Minister of Health of British Columbia
- In office August 14, 2026 – November 20, 2026
- Premier: David Eby
- Preceded by: Josie Osborne

Minister of Jobs and Economic Growth of British Columbia
- In office July 17, 2025 – August 14, 2026
- Premier: David Eby
- Preceded by: Diana Gibson
- Succeeded by: Brenda Bailey
- In office November 26, 2020 – December 7, 2022
- Premier: John Horgan; David Eby
- Preceded by: Michelle Mungall
- Succeeded by: Brenda Bailey

Minister of Housing and Municipal Affairs of British Columbia Minister of Housing (2022–2024)
- In office December 7, 2022 – July 17, 2025
- Premier: David Eby
- Preceded by: Murray Rankin (Housing); Anne Kang (Municipal Affairs)
- Succeeded by: Christine Boyle

Parliamentary Secretary for Forests, Lands, Natural Resource Operations and Rural Development of British Columbia
- In office July 26, 2019 – November 26, 2020
- Premier: John Horgan
- Preceded by: Position established
- Succeeded by: Roly Russell (Rural Development)

Parliamentary Secretary for Sport and Multiculturalism of British Columbia
- In office July 18, 2017 – July 26, 2019
- Premier: John Horgan
- Preceded by: Sam Sullivan (Minister of Sport)
- Succeeded by: Position abolished

Member of the British Columbia Legislative Assembly for Delta North
- In office May 9, 2017 – October 24, 2026
- Preceded by: Scott Hamilton
- Succeeded by: Monica Mohan

Personal details
- Born: Ravinder Kahlon; May 15, 1979 (age 47) Victoria, British Columbia, Canada
- Party: BC NDP
- Occupation: Athlete; politician
- Sports career
- Nationality: Canadian
- Height: 6 ft 3 in (191 cm)
- Sport: Field hockey
Medal record
Men's field hockey
Representing Canada
Pan American Games
Gold medal – first place	2007 Rio de Janeiro	Team
Silver medal – second place	2003 Santo Domingo	Team

Ravinder "Ravi" Kahlon (born May 15, 1979) is a Canadian politician and athlete who served as a member of the Legislative Assembly of British Columbia (MLA) representing the electoral district of Delta North from 2017 to 2026. A member of the New Democratic Party, he served in the Cabinet of British Columbia from 2020 until 2026.

Prior to provincial politics, Kahlon was a field hockey player, representing Canada at several international events including the 2000 and 2008 Summer Olympics.

== Early life and playing career ==
Kahlon was born and raised in Victoria, British Columbia; his mother was a restaurateur, while his father was a sawmill worker. He was introduced to field hockey by his family at the age of 7, and began playing as a defender in the Victoria League at age twelve. He graduated from Lambrick Park Secondary School, where he also played basketball. He was selected to the junior national field hockey team in 1999 and was named team captain. Kahlon was a student at Camosun College in Victoria at the time. He earned his first international senior cap for the Men's National Team in 2000 against Malaysia in Brussels.

Eventually competing at every level of international competition, Kahlon's career would include playing three times in Hockey World Cup qualifying tournaments, representing Canada at the 2002 and 2006 Commonwealth Games, a gold medal performance at the 2007 Pan American Games, and tenth-place finishes at the 2000 Summer Olympics in Sydney and 2008 Summer Olympics in Beijing.

He moved to the Metro Vancouver suburb of Delta in 2005 to facilitate his career with the Vancouver-based national field hockey team. After retiring from playing, he began a career in banking, and also served as director of stakeholder relations for the BC NDP caucus. In 2013, Kahlon was inducted into the Delta Sports Hall of Fame.

== Political career ==
In October 2016, Kahlon announced he would be running for office in the 2017 provincial election with the BC NDP; he won the NDP nomination in Delta North. That riding is considered a swing district, having been won three times each by the BC NDP and British Columbia Liberal Party in the six elections prior to 2017. When the election was held on May 9, 2017, Kahlon defeated Liberal incumbent Scott Hamilton by a margin of 9.14 percentage points.

The 2017 British Columbia election resulted in a hung parliament, with no party controlling a majority of seats in the Legislative Assembly. However, the NDP was eventually able to form a minority government with the support of the Green Party of British Columbia. The NDP government was sworn in on July 18, 2017, with new Premier John Horgan naming Kahlon as Parliamentary Secretary for Sport and Multiculturalism. Kahlon was later named Parliamentary Secretary for Forests, Lands, Natural Resource Operations and Rural Development.

Kahlon supported eventual winner Jagmeet Singh for leader of the federal New Democratic Party in that party's 2017 leadership election.

Following his re-election in 2020, in which he won 56.78% of the vote, he was named Minister of Jobs, Economic Recovery and Innovation.

After Horgan announced his retirement as premier and party leader in 2022, Kahlon endorsed David Eby and joined as co-chair of Eby's campaign, alongside Katrina Chen. Kahlon was subsequently named Minister of Housing and Government House Leader in the Eby ministry on December 7, 2022.

In January 2025, during the trade war with the United States, Kahlon was named to chair the cabinet committee coordinating the province's response. In July 2025, he was named Minister of Jobs and Economic Growth, taking over the province's trade file. On August 14, 2026, he was named Minister of Health following a cabinet shuffle. On September 22, 2026, Kahlon announced he would not run for re-election during the snap 2026 British Columbia general election.

== Electoral record ==
2024 British Columbia general election: Delta North
Party	Candidate	Votes	%	±%	Expenditures
New Democratic	Ravi Kahlon	10,988	52.73	-4.5	$56,496.69
Conservative	Raj Veauli	8,381	40.22	–	$62,045.72
Green	Nick Dickinson-Wilde	1,292	6.20	-3.4	$0.00
Freedom	Manqoosh Khan	177	0.85	–	$0.00
Total valid votes/expense limit		20,838	99.82	–	$71,700.08
Total rejected ballots		38	0.18	–	
Turnout		20,876	57.89	–	
Registered voters		36,062			
New Democratic notional hold		Swing		−22.3	
Source: Elections BC

2020 British Columbia general election: Delta North
Party	Candidate	Votes	%	±%	Expenditures
New Democratic	Ravi Kahlon	12,215	56.78	+7.95	$53,820.55
Liberal	Jet Sunner	7,179	33.37	−6.32	$41,134.08
Green	Neema Manral	2,120	9.85	−1.64	$9,864.40
Total valid votes		21,514	100.00	–	
Total rejected ballots					
Turnout					
Registered voters					
Source: Elections BC

2017 British Columbia general election: Delta North
Party	Candidate	Votes	%	±%	Expenditures
New Democratic	Ravi Kahlon	11,465	48.83	+5.24	$48,460
Liberal	Scott Hamilton	9,319	39.69	−4.84	$65,204
Green	Jacquie Miller	2,697	11.48	+5.40	$2,920
Total valid votes		23,481	100.00	–	
Total rejected ballots		123	0.52	+0.10	
Turnout		23,604	64.99	+5.05	
Registered voters		36,319			
New Democratic gain from Liberal		Swing		+5.04	
Source: Elections BC

== International senior competitions ==
- 2000 — Olympic Games, Sydney (10th)
- 2001 — World Cup Qualifier, Edinburgh (8th)
- 2002 — Commonwealth Games, Manchester (6th)
- 2003 — Pan American Games, Santo Domingo (2nd)
- 2004 — Olympic Qualifying Tournament, Madrid (11th)
- 2004 — Pan American Cup, London (2nd)
- 2006 — Commonwealth Games, Melbourne (9th)
- 2007 — Pan American Games, Rio de Janeiro (1st)
- 2008 — Olympic Games, Beijing (10th)
