= Zeeshan Wahla =

Canadian politician

The Honourable Zeeshan Wahla MLA

Member of the British Columbia Legislative Assembly for Surrey City Centre
- Incumbent
- Assumed office October 24, 2026
- Preceded by: Amna Shah

Minister of State for Housing
- Incumbent
- Assumed office November 20, 2026
- Preceded by: Christine Boyle

Personal details
- Party: Conservative
- Website: website

Muhammad Zeeshan Wahla MLA is a Canadian politician who is the Member of the British Columbia Legislative Assembly for Surrey City Centre since the 2026 British Columbia general election.

Wahla is a professional engineer. He was the Conservative Party of British Columbia's candidate for the same riding in the 2024 election, but was not elected.

== Electoral record ==
2026 British Columbia general election: Surrey City Centre
Party	Candidate	Votes	%	±%	Expenditures
Conservative	Zeeshan Wahla	6,396	47.15		
New Democratic	Amna Shah	6,012	44.32		
OneBC	Oliver Wildfong	636	4.69		
CentreBC	Raman Sharma	481	3.55		
Total valid votes		13,525	99.70		
Total rejected ballots		41	0.30		
Turnout		13,566			
Registered voters					
Conservative gain from New Democratic		Swing		+1.98	
Source: Elections BC

2024 British Columbia general election: Surrey City Centre
Party	Candidate	Votes	%	±%	Expenditures
New Democratic	Amna Shah	6,439	46.24	-23.3	
Conservative	Zeeshan Wahla	6,343	45.55		
Green	Colin Boyd	845	6.07		
Independent	Saeed Naguib	155	1.11		
Communist	Ryan Abbott	143	1.03		
Total valid votes			–		
Total rejected ballots					
Turnout					
Registered voters					
New Democratic hold		Swing		–34.41	
Source: Elections BC
