= Sam Sullivan =

Canadian politician (born 1959)

Sam Sullivan CM
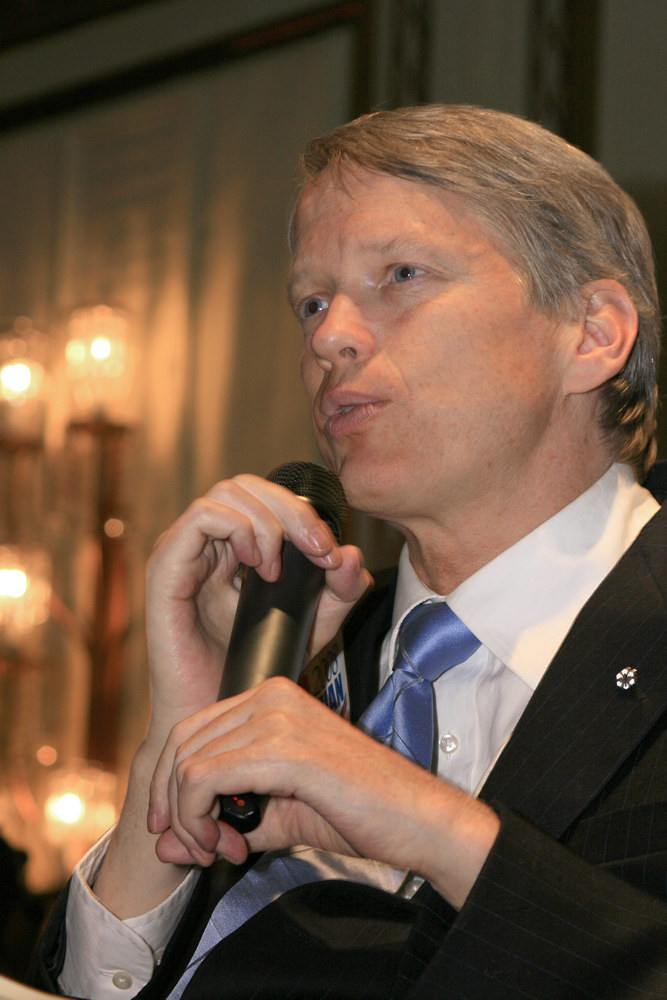
- Sullivan in May 2008

38th Mayor of Vancouver
- In office December 5, 2005 – December 8, 2008
- Preceded by: Larry Campbell
- Succeeded by: Gregor Robertson

Minister of Community, Sport and Cultural Development of British Columbia
- In office June 12, 2017 – July 18, 2017
- Premier: Christy Clark
- Preceded by: Peter Fassbender
- Succeeded by: Lisa Beare (Tourism, Arts, and Culture)

Member of the British Columbia Legislative Assembly for Vancouver-False Creek
- In office May 14, 2013 – October 24, 2020
- Preceded by: Mary McNeil
- Succeeded by: Brenda Bailey

Personal details
- Born: November 13, 1959 (age 66)
- Party: BC Conservatives (provincial, current); BC Liberal Party (provincial, former); Non-Partisan Association (municipal)
- Education: Simon Fraser University; Langara College

Sam C. Sullivan CM (born November 13, 1959) is a Canadian politician who served as the MLA for Vancouver-False Creek. Previously, he served as the Minister of Communities, Sport, and Cultural Development with responsibility for Translink in the short-lived BC Liberal government after the 2017 election, as well as the 38th mayor of Vancouver, British Columbia, Canada, and has been invested as a member of the Order of Canada. He is currently President of the Global Civic Policy Society and an adjunct professor at UBC.

== Early life ==
Sam Sullivan was born on November 13, 1959, to East Vancouver residents Lloyd and Ida Sullivan. His father ran Sully's Autoparts on East Hastings Street. He has three brothers, Donald, Patrick, Terry, and a sister, Carol. Sullivan attended Chief Maquinna Elementary and Vancouver Technical Secondary School in East Vancouver.

== Quadriplegia ==
Sullivan became paralyzed after breaking his neck in a skiing accident at age 19. He had a fracture dislocation of his fourth and fifth cervical vertebrae, leaving him almost completely paralyzed.

After a seven-year struggle with depression, he successfully completed a Bachelor of Business Administration degree at Simon Fraser University. Sullivan later founded six non-profit organizations dedicated to improving the quality of life for disabled people in North America.

== Disability advocacy ==
In 2005, Sullivan was inducted into the Order of Canada, the nation's highest civilian award for community achievement. This was in recognition of his work to improve the lives of those with significant disabilities. The Sam Sullivan Disability Foundation has raised over $20 million and served over 10,000 people with disabilities since its inception. Organizations he created include the following:

- Tetra Society: this organization recruits technically skilled volunteers who create custom-made assistive devices that are not available on the market. There are currently 45 chapters throughout Canada and the US, which have created more than 5,000 devices.
- Adaptive Sailing Association: beginning at Vancouver's Jericho Sailing Center there are now 20 programs throughout Canada and the US. Sullivan initiated the development of the Martin 16 sailboat, designed specifically for people with disabilities, including high-level quadriplegics who use sip-and-puff technology. 150 of these sailboats are in use throughout the world. Sullivan also initiated the Mobility Cup National Regatta for people with disabilities.
- British Columbia Mobility Opportunities Society Wilderness Access Program: Sullivan worked with Tetra Volunteer Paul Cermak to invent the TrailRider, a one-wheeled vehicle that enables people with disabilities to access the wilderness. 100 of these are currently in use around the world. They have been used by people with significant disabilities to climb Mount Kilimanjaro and to the base camp of Mount Everest. BCMOS also operates an Adaptive Paddleboarding and Kayaking program at the Olympic Village.
- Vancouver Adapted Music Society: This organization operates a music studio in the GF Strong Rehabilitation Centre and supports the musical aspirations of people with disabilities, including recordings and performances. Sam Sullivan and Dave Symington formed the band Spinal Chord and recorded an album of original music in 1993 called Why Be Normal? Sullivan was the band's vocalist and played keyboards using custom-designed computer software.
- ConnecTra Society: ConnecTra links people with physical disabilities to activities and programs that will, over time, allow them to grow, gain confidence and become increasingly active and involved in the community. It has helped over 200 people with disabilities since the inception of the ConnecTra Project in 2012. This project helps people with disabilities get signed up at their local WorkBC. Many participants have gone on to find part-time and full-time jobs.

In recognition of these achievements, Sullivan was inducted into the Terry Fox Hall of Fame in 2000 and won the Christopher Reeve Award in 2008.

== City Councillor ==
Sullivan was first elected to Vancouver City Council in 1993 as a member of the Non-Partisan Association (NPA), and served for 15 years total.

In Vancouver's 2002 general local elections, Sullivan was the only incumbent member of city council from the NPA to win re-election after the NPA-dominated council was defeated by the COPE party, leaving only five out of 27 seats on the council, school board and parks board.

In 2004, he led the Knowards campaign opposing the COPE-initiated campaign to replace the city's at-large system of choosing councillors with a ward voting system. The proposal was defeated 54% to 46% in a referendum.

== 2005 mayoral race ==
Following the 2002 electoral losses, the Non-Partisan Association rebuilt its slate for the 2005 election. Sullivan beat former BC Liberal Party deputy-Premier Christy Clark for the NPA mayoral nomination. He then led the party to electoral majorities on the City Council, School Board and Park Board with 17 out of 27 seats.

On May 2, 2006, Sullivan provided a statement to the Royal Canadian Mounted Police about his past decisions to provide money to illegal drug users. Because of increased public awareness surrounding these incidents during the mayoralty race, the Vancouver Chief of Police requested that the RCMP investigate these incidents.

Sullivan's statement gave a brief account of his decision to provide financial support to a 20-year-old woman working as a prostitute in his neighbourhood in the late 1990s, by providing $40 a day for three weeks for heroin. Sullivan also gave money to a severely addicted crack cocaine user so he did not have to steal, and let him smoke in his van.

=== Jim / James Green controversy ===
In the election, Sullivan ran against several candidates, the most prominent of which was Vision Vancouver councillor Jim Green. Sullivan defeated Green by a narrow margin of 3,747 votes of 130,000 ballots cast. A second, independent candidate named James Green also ran in this election, gaining over 4,000 votes. The close margin of Sullivan's victory and the similarity of independent candidate James Green's name to that of Sullivan's main opponent Jim Green led to a major controversy. Speculation that James Green was a "spoiler" candidate was inflamed when it became known that Sullivan had helped Green in a dispute about office space. No allegations were ever proven that Sullivan was supporting the independent candidate James Green, and both men denied any wrongdoing.

== As mayor of Vancouver ==
=== Citizen Sam documentary ===
Sullivan was the subject of a National Film Board of Canada documentary, Citizen Sam. It premiered in November 2006, and was nominated for a Gemini Award.

=== Olympic and Paralympic Games ===
Sullivan took part in the Closing Ceremony of the 2006 Winter Olympics, in the ceremony where the Olympic Flag was passed from Turin to Vancouver. The ceremony involves an official of the current host city waving the flag eight times, then handing it off to an official of the next host city, who waves it eight times. When it was his turn, the flag was put into a special bracket built into Sullivan's wheelchair. He then swung his wheelchair back and forth eight times to wave the flag.

After the event, Sullivan received letters from people across the world who were inspired by the act, and received many invitations to be a keynote speaker at conventions. "I especially was moved to get letters from people who wrote very eloquent letters, saying they had considered suicide, and changed their mind when they saw me perform my duties...To see I had such an impact on people's lives was truly a humbling experience," Sullivan said in response to the reaction.

=== EcoDensity initiative ===
Shortly after the World Urban Forum held in Vancouver in June 2006, Sullivan launched the EcoDensity initiative. It was defined at its launch 'to make Vancouver more sustainable, affordable, and liveable'. This included plans to densify Vancouver, including more towers and allowing secondary houses on existing single-family properties. Sullivan claimed higher densities and smaller ecological footprints were necessary to sustain a growing population.

In a move that was roundly criticized by both community members and the local media, Sullivan's staff registered the term "EcoDensity" with the patent office, under his name. In September 2007 the City of Vancouver announced that the ownership of the trademark had been transferred to the city.

In 2009 the Canadian Institute of Planners awarded the EcoDensity its Planning Excellence award for City Planning.

=== Project Civil City ===
Sullivan conducted an informal survey on his website asking visitors how they felt about civil disorder in the City of Vancouver. On November 26, 2006, he released the results of his survey and created a new program called Project Civil City, which is known as the mayor's effort to enhance public order in Vancouver's public areas. The conclusion of Project Civil City was that police were not the answer to the city's social problems. The police chief of that time was opposed to the project, saying "I'm not in favor of this kind of position" and "I can do this job". Throughout his term, Sullivan was criticized by the opposition for his reluctance to hire more police. An important initiative of Project Civil City was the creation of the Street to Home Foundation, whose goal was to encourage philanthropists in the city to contribute toward the solution to homelessness.

An initiative Sullivan championed was CAST(chronic addiction substitution treatment). This would prescribe drugs to people with addictions. He formed a group called Inner Change which raised several million dollars to support the SALOME drug trials. An important goal was to reduce overdose deaths. This was opposed by the opposition.

Statistics from the Vancouver Police Board indicate that in 2005, the year before he became mayor, 51,429 property crimes were reported in the city. In 2008, his final year as Mayor there were 40,514 property crimes.

However, in its first two years, homelessness went up 54 to 78 per cent, drug offences doubled, and street disorder went up 84 per cent. The project was cancelled in 2010.

=== Civic strike ===
A civic strike of Vancouver's inside, outside, and library workers that began on July 26, 2007, was dubbed "Sam's Strike" by the strikers. The strike lasted 88 days and was the second longest in Vancouver's history; the longest was 90 days under Mayor Mike Harcourt in 1981. The unions blamed Sullivan's intransigence at the bargaining table for prolonging the strike. The union cited the city never tabling a written counteroffer as evidence of the city not negotiating. A mediator was called in who recommended 17.5% (21% compounded), which was the amount accepted by the rest of the municipalities in the region. When two of the civic unions rejected the recommendation, public support collapsed, and within the week a new vote by the three civic unions accepted the deal. On October 19, 2007 CUPE Local 391 voted 71 per cent in favour of the city's offer and ended the strike.

=== NPA donation allegations ===
Critics accused of Sullivan of misusing political donations when $5000 raised for the Knowards campaign through the Nanitch Policy Society was used to buy tickets for campaign volunteers at a 2004 NPA dinner. Calls for an inquiry by Vancouver city council opposition members were subsequently dismissed by the Provincial government. In December 2009, The Tyee published a letter from Sullivan in which he explained the background behind the Nanitch Policy Society, and in particular the donation made to the NPA.

== Ouster from NPA ==
In 2008, although the NPA board had greenlighted Sullivan to run for mayor and he had the endorsement of all NPA City Councillors, NPA councillor Peter Ladner announced that he wanted to challenge Sullivan for mayor. On June 8, 2008, it was announced that Ladner had defeated Sullivan to win the NPA's mayoral nomination. Ladner beat Sullivan in a tight, 1,066-to-986 vote after convincing enough NPA members that Sullivan would be defeated in the municipal election without a change in leadership. Ladner proceeded to lose against his mayoral opponent with NPA reduced to 4 out of 27 seats on the council, School Board and Park Board.

== Post-mayoral activities ==
=== Global Civic Policy Society ===
In November 2009, Sullivan formed the Global Civic Policy Society with a $500,000 startup grant from the Annenberg Foundation of California. The society hosts a speaker series called Public Salons that "provide a public platform for the thinkers and doers of Vancouver". The presentations are featured on a 1/2 hour weekly television program on Shaw TV called Sam Sullivan's Public Salons. Through its Greeting Fluency Initiative, the society hosts salons that encourage citizens to "learn a few words of greetings in the languages of their neighbours". It has developed a smartphone app called Greeting Fluency Aid, available free to the public, containing greeting phrases from eighteen languages. It includes over 30 endangered first nations languages of British Columbia. The society hosts the Vancouver Urban Forum with a specific goal of increasing urban densities. Its Early Documents Transcription Program is putting the oldest Vancouver City Council Minutes online for free access to the public. It contributes to short BC education and policy videos under the Kumtuks banner which had 800,000 views by the end of 2017.

In 2023 Sullivan launched Global Civic as an Advocacy Think Tank modelled after groups in London, New York and Ottawa. Alain Bertaud, former Principal Urban Planner for the World Bank, made a 10 day visit to Vancouver to launch the House Price Initiative.

Sullivan launched his End the Downtown Eastside Project in July 2025.

=== Centre for Fourth Wave Reform ===
In February 2011, Sullivan founded the Centre for Fourth Wave Reform to explore ideas for change in municipal governance. This was amalgamated into the Global Civic Advocacy think tank in 2023.

=== Chinook Jargon Revival ===
Sullivan is trying to promote the revival of Chinook Jargon, the aboriginal trade language once widely used in British Columbia. On June 27, 2015, together with retired University of British Columbia Anthropology professor Jay Powell, he hosted Chinook Wawa Day at the Creekside Community Centre in Vancouver; from September 26–27, they hosted Chinook Wawa Weekend. The workshops featured educational material to support citizens interested in the nearly extinct language. Sullivan has published and translated several videos of aboriginal elders speaking Chinook Wawa.

In 2023 Sullivan contracted with David Robertson, the world's foremost expert on Northern Chinook Jargon, to create a new comprehensive Teach Yourself Northern Chinook Jargon curriculum. Sullivan introduced it to the BC Social Studies Teacher’s Association conference in October 2024.

=== Transcribimus ===
In June 2012, Sullivan began hiring individuals and later recruiting volunteers to transcribe handwritten Vancouver City Council Minutes from 1886 to 1891. His goal was to make the achievements of David Oppenheimer, Vancouver's second Mayor, accessible online free of charge to the public. In December 2015 he announced the completion of the first four years of Minutes and the creation of Transcribimus to recruit more volunteers to transcribe additional handwritten documents of Vancouver. Transcribimus is a network of over 100 volunteers that have completed 7000 pages of handwritten Vancouver City Council minutes from 1886 to 1901.

=== Kumtuks Educational Series ===
In January 2016, Sullivan began publishing Kumtuks, a Chinook Jargon word meaning "knowledge". The series includes a video channel and articles about British Columbia's history, public policy, and general knowledge. Kumtuks videos have been viewed over 2 million times on various social media platforms and are often used by teachers.

== Provincial politics ==
In November 2012, Sullivan announced he would seek the BC Liberal Party nomination in Vancouver-False Creek after the current incumbent Mary McNeil said she would not be seeking a second term in the 2013 British Columbia general election. Sullivan's main competition for the nomination was Lorne Mayencourt. Sullivan defeated Mayencourt by a vote of 273 to 202, with commercial litigation lawyer Brian Fixter coming in third. Sullivan went on to win the election, receiving 11,328 votes, with the NDP candidate Matt Toner receiving 7,981 votes.

=== 2017 provincial election ===
Sullivan was re-elected in the 2017 election as MLA for Vancouver False Creek, but only after a recount. On June 11, he was appointed Minister of Communities, Sport and Cultural Development with responsibility for Translink. His first move was to scrap the requirement for a referendum on Transit funding.

His tenure in cabinet was short lived as the Liberal minority government of Christy Clark was defeated in a confidence motion on June 29, 2017. As a result, the BC New Democratic Party led by John Horgan formed a government weeks later, with the support of the Green Party of British Columbia, and Sullivan and the Liberals moved to the Opposition benches where he served as the Official Opposition Critic for Housing. Clark announced her resignation as Liberal leader weeks later.

=== Liberal leadership ===
Sullivan announced on September 21, 2017, that he was seeking the leadership of the BC Liberal Party. He was eliminated on the first ballot. "Sam Sullivan entered to raise issues, not win, and finished sixth, which is probably where he expected to be," Vancouver Sun columnist Vaughn Palmer would write. Sullivan was defeated in the 2020 provincial election.

== Electoral record ==
2020 British Columbia general election: Vancouver-False Creek
Party	Candidate	Votes	%	±%	Expenditures
New Democratic	Brenda Bailey	11,484	46.77	+6.30	$47,212.32
Liberal	Sam Sullivan	9,217	37.54	−4.62	$85,582.35
Green	Maayan Kreitzman	3,108	12.66	−3.11	$9,079.62
Conservative	Erik Gretland	465	1.89	–	$1,126.02
Libertarian	Naomi Chocyk	280	1.14	+0.27	$0.00
Total valid votes		24,554	100.00	–	
Total rejected ballots		201	0.81	+0.08	
Turnout		24,755	51.06	−4.62	
Registered voters		48,482			
New Democratic gain from Liberal		Swing		+5.46	
Source: Elections BC

=== 2018 BC Liberal leadership ===
= Eliminated from next round
= Winner

Candidate	Ballot 1		Ballot 2				Ballot 3				Ballot 4				Ballot 5			
Name	Votes	Points	Votes	+/-	Points	+/-	Votes	+/-	Points	+/-	Votes	+/-	Points	+/-	Votes	+/-	Points	+/-
Andrew Wilkinson	4828; 15.69%	1591.46; 18.29%	4928; 16.05%	100; 0.36%	1630.98; 18.75%	39.52; 0.46%	6436; 22.39%	1508; 6.34%	2202.30; 25.29%	571.33; 6.54%	7832; 29.22%	1396; 6.83%	2863.51; 32.91%	661.21; 7.62%	12509; 53.76%	4677; 24.54%	4621.29; 53.12%	1757.78; 20.21%
Dianne Watts	7449; 24.20%	2135.13; 24.54%	7537; 24.54%	88; 0.34%	2167.49; 24.91%	32.36; 0.37%	8036; 27.95%	499; 3.41%	2470.62; 28.38%	303.13; 3.47%	9130; 34.06%	1094; 6.11%	3006.96; 34.56%	536.34; 6.18%	10761; 46.24%	1631; 12.18%	4078.71; 46.88%	1071.75; 12.32%
Michael Lee	8100; 26.32%	1916.68; 22.03%	8206; 26.72%	106; 0.40%	1956.29; 22.49%	39.60; 0.46%	8614; 29.96%	408; 3.24%	2261.09; 26.03%	304.80; 3.54%	9842; 36.72%	1228; 6.76%	2829.53; 32.52%	568.44; 6.49%	eliminated			
Todd Stone	5073; 16.48%	1483.48; 17.05%	5134; 16.72%	61; 0.23%	1504.69; 17.30%	21.21; 0.25%	5664; 19.70%	530; 2.98%	1765.98; 20.29%	261.30; 2.99%	eliminated							
Mike de Jong	4837; 15.72%	1415.13; 16.27%	4906; 15.97%	69; 0.26%	1440.56; 16.56%	25.43; 0.29%	eliminated											
Sam Sullivan	488; 1.59%	158.11; 1.82%	eliminated															
TOTAL	30775	8700	30711	-64	8700	-	28750	-1961	8700	-	26804	-1946	8700	-	23270	-3534	8700	-

2017 British Columbia general election: Vancouver-False Creek
Party	Candidate	Votes	%	±%	Expenditures
Liberal	Sam Sullivan	10,370	42.16	−10.27	$51,086
New Democratic	Morgane Oger	9,955	40.47	+3.53	$30,096
Green	Bradley Darren Shende	3,880	15.77	+6.85	$1,575
Libertarian	Liz Jaluague	213	0.87	–	$0
Your Political Party	James Filippelli	91	0.37	+0	$561
Citizens First	Phillip James Ryan	90	0.36	–	$121
Total valid votes		24,599	100.00	–	
Total rejected ballots		181	0.73	+0.18	
Turnout		24,780	55.68	+5.57	
Registered voters		44,508			
Source: Elections BC

2013 British Columbia general election: Vancouver-False Creek
Party	Candidate	Votes	%	±%	Expenditures
Liberal	Sam Sullivan	11,228	52.21	−4.19	$114,796
New Democratic	Matt Toner	7,981	37.11	+9.58	$110,920
Green	Daniel Tseghay	1,928	8.96	−4.15	$1,050
No Affiliation	Ian James Tootill	199	0.93	–	$8,270
First	Sal Vetro	90	0.42	–	$3,207
Your Political Party	James Filippelli	81	0.37	–	$610
Total valid votes		21,507	100.0	–	
Total rejected ballots		118	0.55	−0.17	
Turnout		21,625	50.11	+1.96	
Eligible voters		43,157			
Source: Elections BC

=== Municipal elections ===
2005 Vancouver municipal election: Mayor
Party	Candidate	Votes	%	Elected
NPA	Sam Sullivan	61,543	47.34	✓
Vision	Jim Green	57,796	44.45	
Independent	James Green	4,273	3.29	
Work Less	Ben West	1,907	1.47	
Independent	Scott Yee	688	0.53	
Interest	Austin Spencer	456	0.35	
Independent	Pedro Mora	443	0.34	
Independent	Gölök Zoltán Buday	384	0.30	
Independent	John Landry Gray	355	0.27	
Independent	Mike Hansen	304	0.23	
Independent	Darrell Zimmerman	283	0.22	
Independent	Frank D'Agostino	275	0.21	
Independent	Ian W. Simpson	246	0.19	
Independent	Arthur Crossman	219	0.17	
Independent	Grant Chancey	198	0.15	
Independent	Ray Power	171	0.13	
Independent	Peter Raymond Haskell	144	0.11	
Independent	Malcolm G. MacLeod	140	0.11	
Independent	Joe Hatoum	96	0.07	
Independent	Eliot Esti	90	0.07	
Total votes		130,011	100.00	
NPA gain from COPE		Swing		–

== Awards and honours ==
Ribbon	Description	Notes
	Member of the Order of Canada	Appointed in 2004; invested in 2005
	Queen Elizabeth II Diamond Jubilee Medal	Decoration awarded in 2012; Canadian version
	King Charles III Coronation Medal	Decoration awarded in 2024; Canadian version

British Columbia provincial government of Christy Clark
Cabinet post (1)
Predecessor	Office	Successor
Peter Fassbender	Minister of Community, Sport and Cultural Development; June 12, 2017–July 18, 2017	Lisa Beare
