= Norm Lortie =

Canadian politician (born 1938)

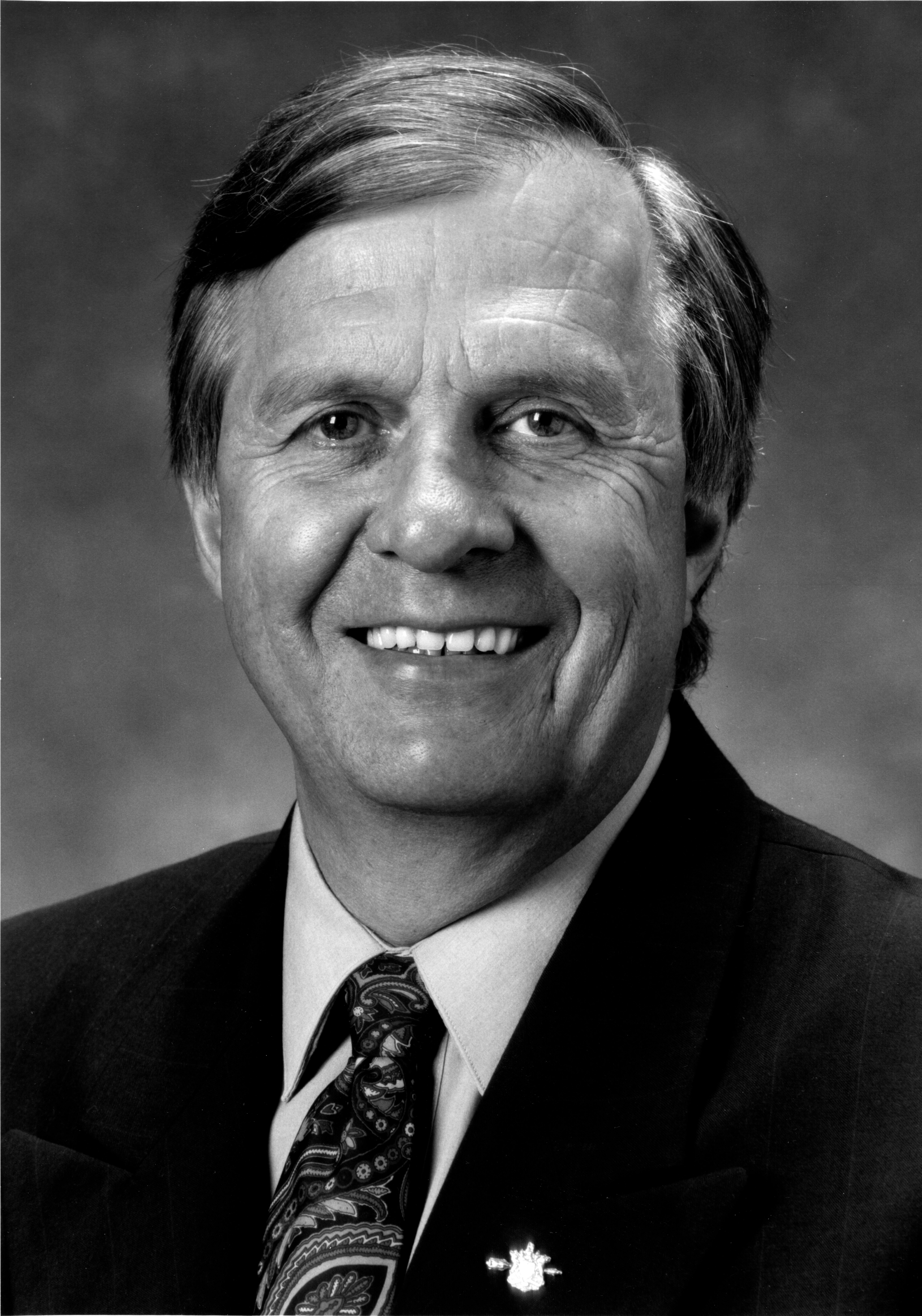

MLA for Delta North
- In office 1991–1996

Personal details
- Born: December 25, 1938 (age 87) Edmonton, Alberta
- Party: British Columbia New Democratic Party

Norm Lortie (born December 25, 1938) was a Canadian politician. He served in the Legislative Assembly of British Columbia from 1991 to 1996, as a NDP member for the constituency of Delta North. He was defeated by Liberal candidate Reni Masi when he sought re-election in both the 1996 and 2001 provincial elections.
