= Vancouver-South Granville =

Provincial electoral district in British Columbia, Canada

British Columbia electoral district
- Location in Vancouver
- District created: 2023
- Last contested: 2024

Provincial electoral district
- Legislature: Legislative Assembly of British Columbia
MLA
Lara Honrado
New Democratic
- First contested: 2024

Vancouver-South Granville is a provincial electoral district for the Legislative Assembly of British Columbia, Canada. Created under the 2021 British Columbia electoral redistribution, the riding was first contested in the 2024 British Columbia general election. It was created out of parts of Vancouver-Fairview, Vancouver-False Creek and Vancouver-Point Grey.

== Geography ==
The district comprises the Vancouver neighbourhood of South Granville, as well as the eastern part of Kitsilano and the western part of Fairview, including Granville Island.

== Members of the Legislative Assembly ==
This riding has elected the following members of the Legislative Assembly:

Assembly	Years	Member	Party
Riding created from Vancouver-Fairview, Vancouver-False Creek, and Vancouver-Point Grey
43rd	2024–2026	Brenda Bailey	New Democratic
44th	2026–present	Lara Honrado	New Democratic

== Election results ==
2026 British Columbia general election
Party	Candidate	Votes	%	±%	Expenditures
New Democratic	Lara Honrado	10,427	47.39	-16.92	
Conservative	Lisa Phillips	6,489	29.49	+4.53	
Green	Maria J Cruz	4,151	18.87	+8.14	
CentreBC	Colin Smith	735	3.34	-	
OneBC	Salvatore Vetro	182	0.83	-	
Total valid votes		21,984	99.92		
Total rejected ballots		18	0.08		
Turnout					
Registered voters					
New Democratic hold		Swing		-10.63	
Source: Elections BC

2024 British Columbia general election
Party	Candidate	Votes	%	±%	Expenditures
New Democratic	Brenda Bailey	17,208	64.31	+7.0	
Conservative	Aron Lageri	6,678	24.96	+24.5	
Green	Adam Hawk	2,872	10.73	-5.9	
Total valid votes		26,758	99.79	–	
Total rejected ballots		55	0.21		
Turnout		26,813			
Registered voters					
New Democratic notional hold		Swing		-8.8	
Source: Elections BC

2020 provincial election redistributed results
Party	%
New Democratic	57.3
Liberal	25.0
Green	16.6
Libertarian	0.6
Conservative	0.5

== Student vote results ==
Student Vote Canada is a non-partisan program in Canada that holds mock elections in elementary and high schools alongside general elections.

2024 British Columbia general election
Party	Candidate	Votes	%	±%
New Democratic	Brenda Bailey	405	45.81	–
Green	Adam Hawk	274	31.00	–
Conservative	Aron Lageri	205	23.19	–
Total valid votes		884	100.0	–
Source: Student Vote Canada

== See also ==
- List of British Columbia provincial electoral districts
- Canadian provincial electoral districts
