= Lara Honrado =

Canadian politician

Lara Honrado MLA

Member of the Legislative Assembly for Vancouver-South Granville
- Incumbent
- Assumed office October 24, 2026
- Preceded by: Brenda Bailey

Personal details
- Party: New Democratic
- Website: website

Lara Honrado MLA is a Canadian politician who was elected the member of the British Columbia Legislative Assembly for Vancouver-South Granville at the 2026 British Columbia general election. She was co-founder and CEO of Ouano Foundation.

== Electoral record ==
2026 British Columbia general election: Vancouver-South Granville
Party	Candidate	Votes	%	±%	Expenditures
New Democratic	Lara Honrado	10,427	47.39	-16.92	
Conservative	Lisa Phillips	6,489	29.49	+4.53	
Green	Maria J Cruz	4,151	18.87	+8.14	
CentreBC	Colin Smith	735	3.34	-	
OneBC	Salvatore Vetro	182	0.83	-	
Total valid votes		21,984	99.92		
Total rejected ballots		18	0.08		
Turnout					
Registered voters					
New Democratic hold		Swing		-10.63	
Source: Elections BC
