= Margareta Dovgal =

Canadian politician

Margareta Dovgal MLA

Member of the British Columbia Legislative Assembly for Vancouver-Yaletown
- Incumbent
- Assumed office October 24, 2026
- Preceded by: Terry Yung

Parliamentary secretary for Children and Youth with Special needs
- Incumbent
- Assumed office November 20, 2026
- Preceded by: Office Established

Personal details
- Party: Conservative
- Other political affiliations: Liberal
- Education: University of British Columbia (BA); University College London (MPA)

Margareta Dovgal MLA is a Canadian politician who is the Member of the British Columbia Legislative Assembly for Vancouver-Yaletown since 2026.

== Biography ==
Dovgal is a graduate of the University of British Columbia and University College London. She was an intern for the British Columbia Liberal Party in 2015 and also the vice president of the Young Liberals of Canada in British Columbia, and also Vice President Communications for the British Columbia Young Liberals.

She was the managing director of Resource Works, a non-profit natural resource advocacy organization and has continuously appeared before the Legislative Assembly concerning matters related to natural resource industry growth and modernization.
