= Terry Yung =

Canadian politician

- 楊子亮
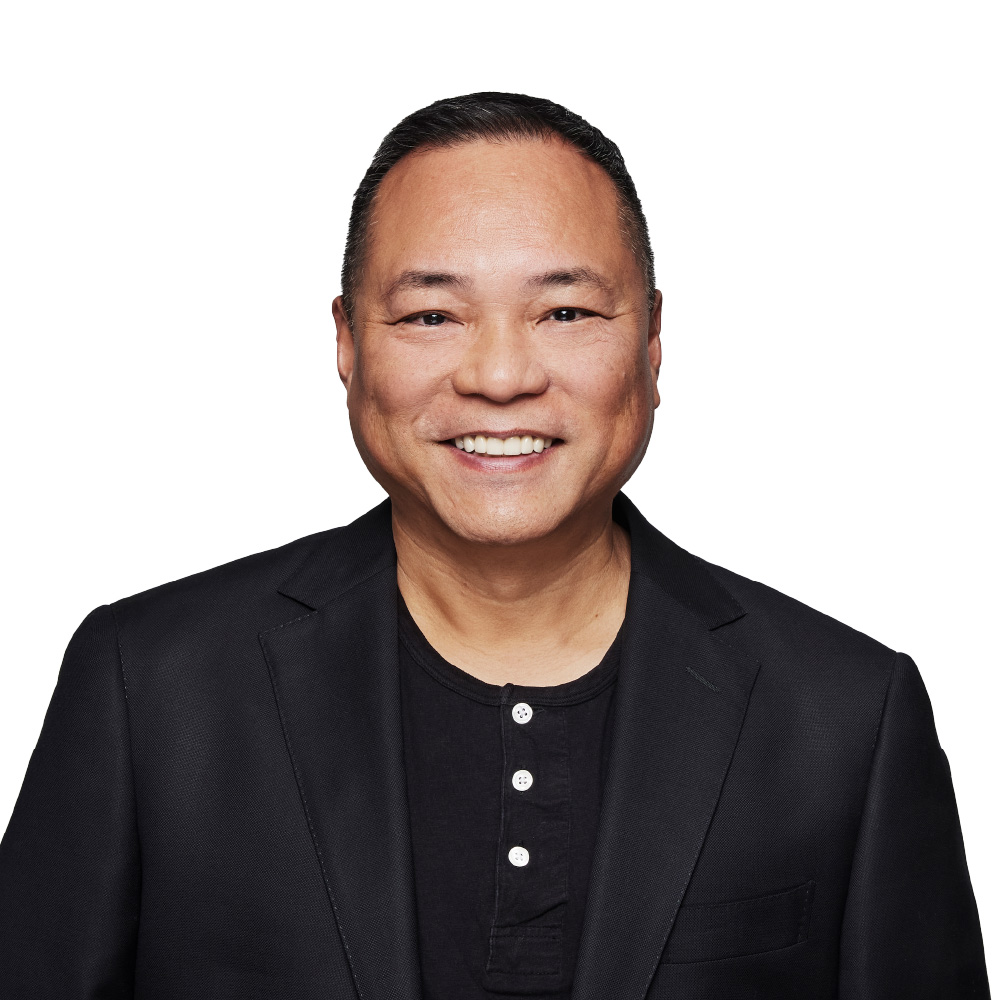
- Campaign portrait, 2024

Minister of State for Community Safety and Integrated Services of British Columbia
- In office November 18, 2024 – November 20, 2026
- Premier: David Eby
- Preceded by: Position established

Member of the British Columbia Legislative Assembly for Vancouver-Yaletown
- In office October 19, 2024 – October 24, 2026
- Preceded by: Riding established
- Succeeded by: Margareta Dovgal

Personal details
- Born: British Hong Kong
- Party: New Democratic Party of British Columbia
- Spouse: Sarah Kirby-Yung
- Education: University of Southern California; Royal Roads University
- Occupation: Police officer (Ret.)

Chinese name
- Traditional Chinese: 楊子亮
- Simplified Chinese: 杨子亮
Transcriptions
Yue: Cantonese
- Jyutping: Joeng^{4} Zi^{2} Loeng^{6}

Terry Yung (traditional Chinese: 楊子亮; simplified Chinese: 杨子亮) is a Canadian politician who served as a member of the Legislative Assembly of British Columbia from 2024 to 2026, representing the electoral district of Vancouver-Yaletown. A member of the British Columbia New Democratic Party (BC NDP), he was Minister of State for Community Safety and Integrated Services.

== Biography ==
Born in Hong Kong, Yung attended a boarding school in the United Kingdom before enrolling in the University of Southern California, graduating with a bachelor of arts degree. He also has a master of arts degree from Royal Roads University. He moved to Vancouver in the early 1990s and became a police officer with the Vancouver Police Department, serving on the force for thirty years and attaining the rank of inspector.

He was a board member of local organizations such as Covenant House Vancouver, Big Brothers of Greater Vancouver and the Justice Institute of British Columbia, and served as board chair for immigrant services organization SUCCESS. Until 2018 he also sat on the board of the Non-Partisan Association (NPA), a Vancouver municipal party; his wife Sarah Kirby-Yung was elected Vancouver city councillor in that year's municipal election as an NPA candidate.

He was acclaimed as the BC NDP's candidate for the newly established riding of Vancouver-Yaletown in the 2024 provincial election, and was elected the riding's member of the Legislative Assembly with over 49% of the vote. He was named to the cabinet of Premier David Eby on November 18, 2024 to serve as Minister of State for Community Safety and Integrated Services.

== Electoral record ==
2024 British Columbia general election: Vancouver-Yaletown
Party	Candidate	Votes	%	±%	Expenditures
New Democratic	Terry Yung	9,018	49.8%	+9.6	
Conservative	Melissa de Genova	7,858	43.4%	+41.3	
Green	Dana-Lyn Mackenzie	1,248	6.9%	-4.3	
Total valid votes		18,124	–		
Total rejected ballots					
Turnout					
Registered voters					
New Democratic notional gain from BC United		Swing		–	
Source: Elections BC
