= Amna Shah =

Canadian politician

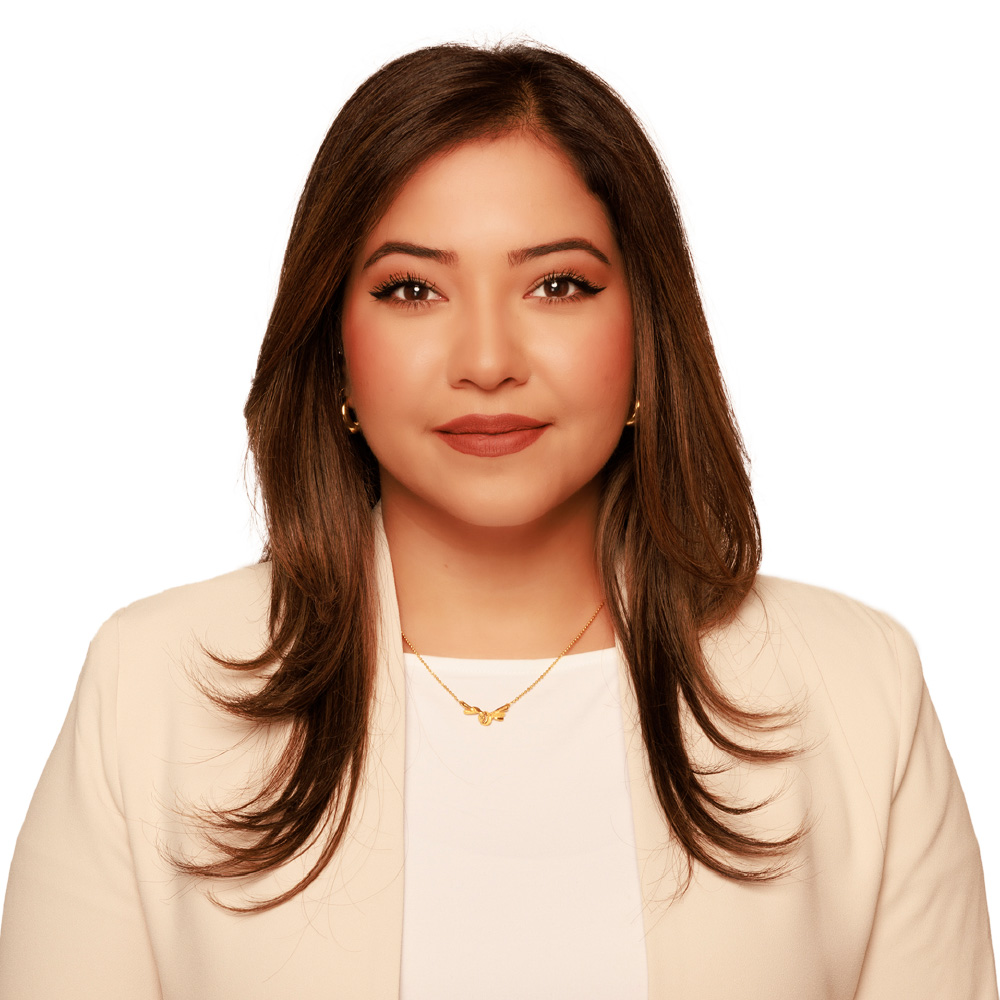
- Campaign portrait, 2024

Parliamentary Secretary for Mental Health and Addictions of British Columbia
- In office November 18, 2024 – November 20, 2026
- Premier: David Eby
- Preceded by: Jennifer Whiteside (as Minister of Mental Health and Addictions)

Member of the Legislative Assembly of British Columbia for Surrey City Centre
- In office October 19, 2024 – October 24, 2026
- Preceded by: District established
- Succeeded by: Zeeshan Wahla

Personal details
- Party: NDP

Amna Shah is a Canadian politician who was elected to the Legislative Assembly of British Columbia in the 2024 British Columbia general election. She represents the electoral district of Surrey City Centre as a member of the British Columbia New Democratic Party.

Shah is new to politics as of 2024, narrowly defeating the Conservative candidate in her riding following an automatic recount ordered by Elections BC. The riding, formerly Surrey-Whalley, was previously held by NDP MLA Bruce Ralston, who did not seek re-election.

== Life and career ==
Shah emigrated from Malaysia to Canada with her parents and two siblings during her teenage years. She later attended Johnston Heights Secondary School.

Prior to the 2024 provincial election, Shah was a board member of the Surrey Food Bank and also formerly worked as Director of Outreach and Stakeholder Relations for the BC NDP caucus.

Shah endorsed Alberta MP Heather McPherson in the 2026 New Democratic Party leadership election.

== Electoral record ==
2024 British Columbia general election: Surrey City Centre
Party	Candidate	Votes	%	±%	Expenditures
New Democratic	Amna Shah	6,439	46.24	-23.3	
Conservative	Zeeshan Wahla	6,343	45.55		
Green	Colin Boyd	845	6.07		
Independent	Saeed Naguib	155	1.11		
Communist	Ryan Abbott	143	1.03		
Total valid votes			–		
Total rejected ballots					
Turnout					
Registered voters					
New Democratic hold		Swing		–34.41	
Source: Elections BC

== See also ==
- 43rd Parliament of British Columbia
