= Paul Choi =

Canadian politician

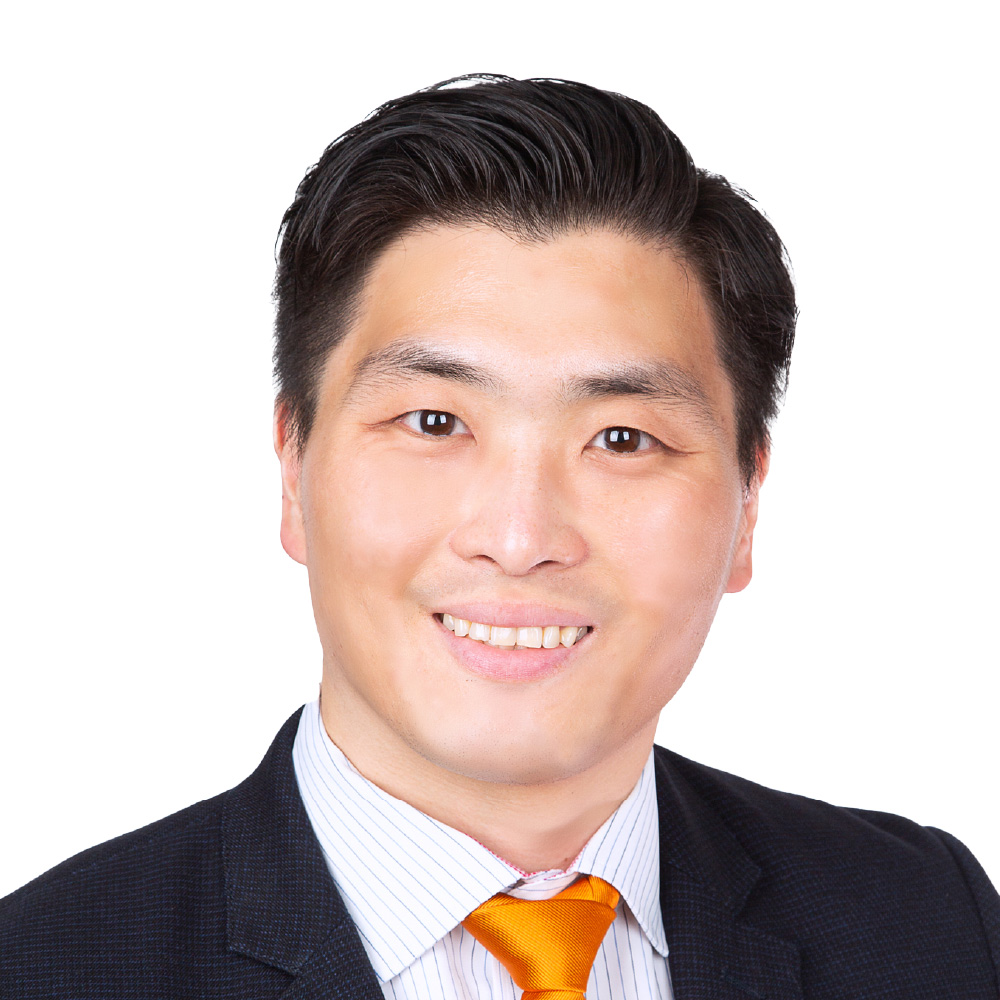
- Campaign portrait, 2024

Parliamentary Secretary for Trade of British Columbia Parliamentary Secretary for Asia-Pacific Trade (2024–2025)
- Incumbent
- Assumed office November 18, 2024
- Premier: David Eby
- Preceded by: Position established

Member of the British Columbia Legislative Assembly for Burnaby South-Metrotown
- In office October 19, 2024 – October 24, 2026
- Preceded by: Constituency established
- Succeeded by: David Xie

Personal details
- Party: New Democratic

Paul Choi is a Canadian politician who served as a member of the Legislative Assembly of British Columbia (MLA) representing the electoral district of Burnaby South–Metrotown form 2024 to 2026. He is a member of the New Democratic Party.

== Early life and career ==
Choi is a lawyer, small business owner, and former police officer in the Vancouver Police Department.

He has also served as the president of the Burnaby North Road Business Improvement Association, and on Kwantlen Polytechnic University's board of governors.

== Political career ==
After being elected in 2024 general election, he was appointed as the Parliamentary Secretary for Asia-Pacific Trade.

During the 2026 general election, Choi narrowly lost reelection to Conservative candidate David Xie.

== Electoral history ==
2026 British Columbia general election: Burnaby South-Metrotown
** Preliminary results — Not yet official **
Party	Candidate	Votes	%	±%	Expenditures
Conservative	David Xie	6,570	44.50	+2.91	
New Democratic	Paul Choi	6,506	44.07	−5.26	
Green	Bryan Fockler	1,268	8.59	+2.33	
OneBC	Andrew Rose	419	2.84	—	
Total valid votes		14,763	99.57		
Total rejected ballots		63	0.43		
Turnout		14,826			
Registered voters					
Conservative gain from New Democratic		Swing		+4.09	
Source: Elections BC

2024 British Columbia general election: Burnaby South-Metrotown
Party	Candidate	Votes	%	±%	Expenditures
New Democratic	Paul Choi	7,560	49.3%	-9.9	
Conservative	Han Lee	6,373	41.6%		
Green	Carrie McLaren	960	6.3%	-6.1	
Unaffiliated	Meiling Chia	290	1.9%		
Independent	MichaelAngelo Abc RobinHood	142	0.9%		
Total valid votes			–		
Total rejected ballots					
Turnout					
Registered voters					
Source: Elections BC
