= Brenda Bailey =

Canadian politician

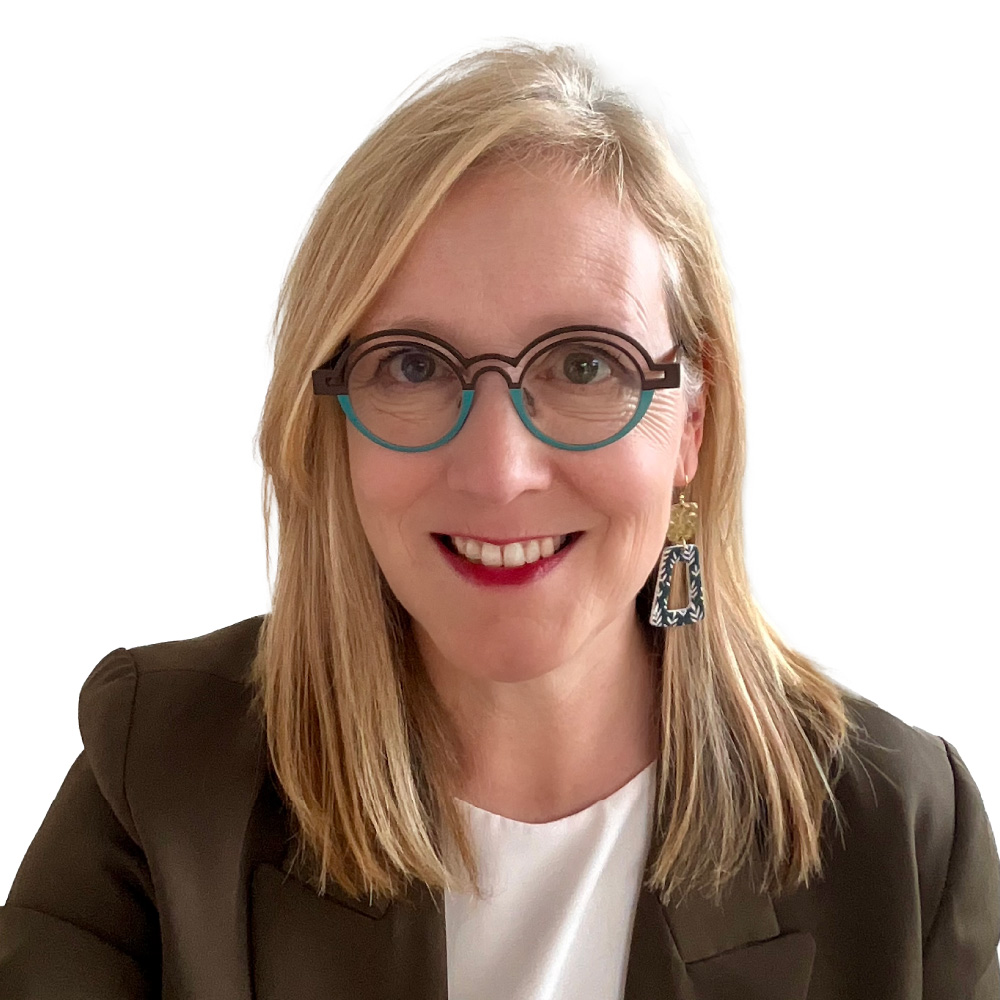
- Campaign portrait, 2024

Minister of Jobs, Economic Development and Innovation of British Columbia
- In office August 14, 2026 – November 20, 2026
- Premier: David Eby
- Preceded by: Josie Osborne
- In office December 7, 2022 – November 18, 2024
- Preceded by: Ravi Kahlon (Jobs, Economic Recovery and Innovation)
- Succeeded by: Diana Gibson

Minister of Finance of British Columbia
- In office November 18, 2024 – August 14, 2026
- Premier: David Eby
- Preceded by: Katrine Conroy
- Succeeded by: Josie Osborne

Parliamentary Secretary for Technology and Innovation of British Columbia
- In office November 26, 2020 – December 7, 2022
- Premier: John Horgan; David Eby
- Preceded by: Rick Glumac (Technology)
- Succeeded by: Position abolished

Member of the British Columbia Legislative Assembly for Vancouver-South Granville Vancouver-False Creek (2020–2024)
- In office October 24, 2020 – October 24, 2026
- Preceded by: Sam Sullivan
- Succeeded by: Lara Honrado

Personal details
- Born: 1966 or 1967 (age 59–60) Nanaimo, British Columbia, Canada
- Party: New Democratic
- Spouse: Bijan Sanii
- Education: McGill University (BA); University of Victoria (M.S.W.)
- Occupation: Businesswoman; politician

Brenda Bailey (born 1966 or 1967) is a Canadian businesswoman and politician who served as a member of the Legislative Assembly (MLA) of British Columbia, representing the electoral district of Vancouver-False Creek from 2020 to 2024, and Vancouver-South Granville from 2024 to 2026. A member of the British Columbia New Democratic Party, she was a cabinet minister under Premier David Eby from 2022 to 2026.

== Life and early career ==
Born and raised in Nanaimo, Bailey graduated from McGill University in 1990 with a bachelor of arts degree in political science and international relations, and holds a degree in social work from University of Victoria. She had worked in the non-profit sector, including as regional manager for the Canadian Cancer Society, prior to entering the video game industry. She co-founded the Vancouver-based game developer Deep Fried Entertainment in 2005, as chief operating officer. In 2010 she co-founded Silicon Sisters, the first Canadian video game studio founded by women to create high quality games for women and girls, and was chief executive officer (CEO). She also co-founded Women in Games Vancouver to support more women entering the sector.

Bailey had been the executive director of Big Sisters of BC Lower Mainland, before being named executive director of DigiBC, the Interactive and Digital Media Industry Association of British Columbia in February 2018.

Bailey was married to environmental economist Basil Stumborg, with whom she has three children. Her current spouse is Bijan Sanii, CEO of BC fintech company INETCO.

== Political career ==
She was elected to the Legislative Assembly of British Columbia for the riding of Vancouver-False Creek in the 2020 election, defeating the incumbent BC Liberal candidate and former Vancouver mayor Sam Sullivan. She was named Parliamentary Secretary for Technology and Innovation by Premier John Horgan on November 26, 2020. She was then appointed Minister of Jobs, Economic Development and Innovation by Premier David Eby on December 7, 2022.

With the False Creek riding dissolved and redistributed ahead of the 2024 provincial election, she ran in the newly established riding of Vancouver-South Granville, where she was re-elected MLA. She was subsequently named Minister of Finance in November 2024. The government's 2026 provincial budget forecasted a record deficit of over $13 billion and implemented public sector job cuts over three years.

In 2026, she was diagnosed with cancer, with Josie Osborne taking the Finance portfolio. Bailey was appointed Jobs and Economic Growth minister during her treatment. She did not run in the October 2026 snap election.

In a November 2026 interview, Bailey said she had successfully completed cancer treatment and is getting involved in the private sector. In the same interview, she criticised Eby's leadership as inauthentic during the snap election campaign, instead regarding Conservative Premier-designate Lorne Doerkson as "very likable."

== Electoral record ==
2024 British Columbia general election: Vancouver-South Granville
Party	Candidate	Votes	%	±%	Expenditures
New Democratic	Brenda Bailey	17,208	64.31	+7.0	
Conservative	Aron Lageri	6,678	24.96	+24.5	
Green	Adam Hawk	2,872	10.73	-5.9	
Total valid votes		26,758	99.79	–	
Total rejected ballots		55	0.21		
Turnout		26,813			
Registered voters					
New Democratic notional hold		Swing		-8.8	
Source: Elections BC

2020 British Columbia general election: Vancouver-False Creek
Party	Candidate	Votes	%	±%	Expenditures
New Democratic	Brenda Bailey	11,484	46.77	+6.30	$47,212.32
Liberal	Sam Sullivan	9,217	37.54	−4.62	$85,582.35
Green	Maayan Kreitzman	3,108	12.66	−3.11	$9,079.62
Conservative	Erik Gretland	465	1.89	–	$1,126.02
Libertarian	Naomi Chocyk	280	1.14	+0.27	$0.00
Total valid votes		24,554	100.00	–	
Total rejected ballots		201	0.81	+0.08	
Turnout		24,755	51.06	−4.62	
Registered voters		48,482			
New Democratic gain from Liberal		Swing		+5.46	
Source: Elections BC
