= Mark Hancock =

21st-century Canadian trade union leader

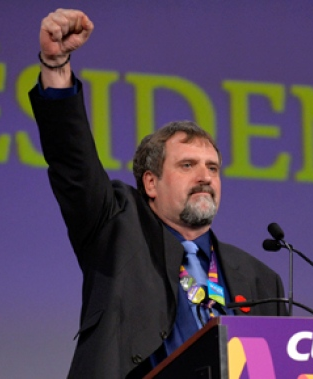
- Hancock at the CUPE National Convention in 2015

6th National President of the Canadian Union of Public Employees
- Incumbent
- Assumed office November 6, 2015
- Secretary-Treasurer: Charles Fleury
- Preceded by: Paul Moist

President of CUPE British Columbia
- In office April 2013 – 2015

Secretary-Treasurer of CUPE British Columbia
- In office May 2005 – 2013

Personal details
- Party: New Democratic

Mark Hancock is a Canadian trade union activist who is currently the National President of the Canadian Union of Public Employees (CUPE). He was elected as the sixth National President of CUPE in 2015. CUPE is the largest trade union in Canada, with 800,000 members.

== Career ==
Hancock got his start with the Canadian Union of Public Employees (CUPE) in 1984 and served as president of CUPE Local 498, representing employees of the City of Port Coquitlam, a suburb of Vancouver, British Columbia for 15 years. Hancock was elected president of his local in 1993 and was subsequently elected to the executive board of CUPE British Columbia, where he served for 12 years, initially as a General Vice-President, then as Secretary-Treasurer starting in 2005 and finally as President of CUPE BC beginning in 2013. Simultaneously, he served on CUPE's National Executive Board beginning in 2005 as Regional Vice-President for British Columbia.

On November 4, 2015, Hancock was elected as the sixth National President of CUPE National after defeating the President of CUPE Ontario Fred Hahn at the biennial CUPE National Convention. Hancock has since been re-elected five times as National President, most recently in October 2025, alongside National Secretary-Treasurer Candace Rennick.

Hancock is an adamant supporter of Canada's New Democratic Party saying he is "100-per-cent committed" to supporting the federal NDP. He lives in Coquitlam, British Columbia.

=== No-concessions bargaining policy ===
In 2016, under Hancock's leadership, CUPE renewed its national bargaining policy to take a firm and proactive stance against concessions and two-tier contracts. "We bargain forward, not backward," Hancock said in explaining the policy.

The policy aims to empower local unions to take a strong stance during negotiations, knowing they will have the political, material and financial support of their national union to make progress at the bargaining table on wages, benefits, job security, and workplace health and safety.

Called a "blueprint for solidarity", the policy includes templates, training and strategic resources for local unions.

The policy has resulted in CUPE locals successfully fending off concessionary demands and winning significant wages increases in the turbulent post-COVID economy. Notable examples include the 2022 Ontario education workers strike, the 2021 CUPE general strike in New Brunswick, and in 2024 when 12 municipal local unions in Alberta broke the provincial government's wage mandate, winning wage increases well above the government's 2.75% wage cap.

=== Ontario education workers ===
In November 2022, 55,000 school board workers in Ontario represented by CUPE defied the Ford government's Bill 28, a law that used the Notwithstanding Clause to impose a contract and make their planned strike illegal. Despite the potential for financial penalties of up to $220.5-million per day, CUPE vowed to continue its walkout for "as long as it takes". Under Hancock's leadership, CUPE mobilized public and private sector unions from across Canada, and plans for a general strike were underway. The move paid off, as the Ford government repealed Bill 28 just days later - the fastest repeal of a government bill in Canadian history. "The [Ford] government blinked," said Hancock, calling it a major win for education workers and the broader labour movement in Canada.

=== 2025 Air Canada flight attendants' strike ===
In August 2025, Hancock played a prominent role in the strike by more than 10,000 Air Canada and Air Canada Rouge flight attendants represented by CUPE's Air Canada Component. After the federal government invoked Section 107 of the Canada Labour Code and the Canada Industrial Relations Board (CIRB) ordered flight attendants back to work, CUPE defied the order, which the union declared unconstitutional, and flight attendants remained on strike. Hancock publicly tore up a copy of the return-to-work order outside Toronto Pearson International Airport and said he was willing to face jail time for defying it. The strike ended on August 19 after CUPE and Air Canada reached a tentative agreement that included compensation for some previously unpaid ground work.

=== Fred Hahn controversy ===
On October 7, 2023, the day Hamas attacked Israel, in which Hamas terrorists killed 1,200 people and took scores captive, Fred Hahn, general vice president of CUPE, tweeted: "Palestine is rising, long live the resistance." 80 Jewish members of CUPE took Hahn and CUPE Ontario to the Ontario Human Rights Tribunal, saying they felt “isolated, unwelcome, scared, silenced, discriminated against, threatened and harassed” by the way their union had responded since the October 7 attack.

In August 2024, Hancock said that Hahn had been asked to respond to a request from the union’s national executive board that he resign due to a social media video post by Hahn that was considered antisemitic. Hahn, for his part, said that he was refusing to step down. Richard Marceau, vice president of the Centre for Israel and Jewish Affairs (CIJA), opined that CUPE should remove Hahn. Carrie Silverberg, one of the people who signed on to the human-rights complaint against CUPE, called Hahn's video “blatantly anti-Semitic”. Ontario’s labour minister, David Piccini, confronted Hahn and asked him to stop being anti-Semitic, and Premier Doug Ford said that Hahn's post was "bigoted". Hancock said that if Hahn does not resign on his own, "that’ll be new ground again for CUPE and me as a national president. I will review options available to me."

Trade union offices
Preceded by Paul Moist	National President of the Canadian Union of Public Employees; 2015–present	Incumbent
