= Kathy Corrigan =

Canadian politician

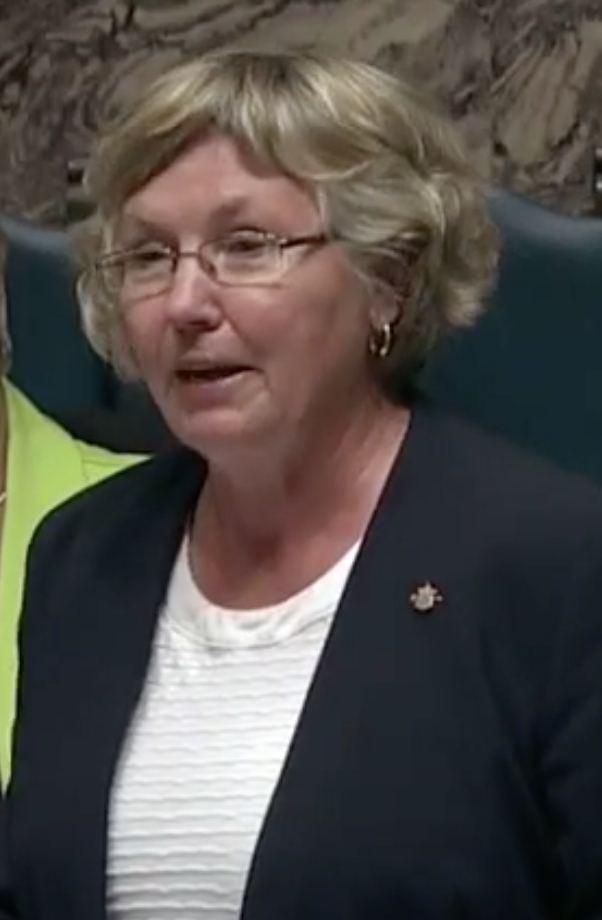

Member of the British Columbia Legislative Assembly for Burnaby-Deer Lake
- In office May 12, 2009 – May 9, 2017
- Preceded by: Riding Established
- Succeeded by: Anne Kang

Personal details
- Born: 1953 (age 72–73) Toronto, Ontario
- Party: New Democratic Party
- Spouse: Derek Corrigan
- Children: 4
- Occupation: Lawyer, policy researcher, politician

Kathy Corrigan (born 1953) is a Canadian politician who served as a Member of the Legislative Assembly of British Columbia in the 39th and 40th Parliament of British Columbia, from 2009 to 2017. As a member of the BC New Democratic Party, she was elected to represent the riding of Burnaby-Deer Lake in the 2009 provincial election and re-elected in the 2013 election. In both parliaments her NDP formed the official opposition and Corrigan acted as their critic on various issues, including 2010 Winter Olympics, women's issues, public safety, the Solicitor General and advanced education. During both the 2011 and the 2014 NDP leadership elections, Corrigan endorsed John Horgan. At the same time as she served as a Member of the Legislative Assembly, her husband Derek Corrigan served as mayor of Burnaby.

== Background ==
She was born in Toronto, Ontario, to a mother who worked as a physics teacher and a father who worked as an engineer. The family, which included Kathy and three siblings, moved to Cornwall, Ontario when she was three years old and then to West Vancouver in 1961. She graduated from Sentinel Secondary School when she was 16 years old and went on to study at the University of British Columbia. At the age of 21, she entered UBC Law. It was there, at a social event for law students in March 1976 that she met Derek Corrigan. They spent time together and were married in December. She graduated in 1978 and practiced law before having her first child in 1980, at the age of 26. She decided to focus on raising a family, so she became a full-time mother and had three more children in the next six years. After her children entered high school, Corrigan took a job as a policy researcher for the Canadian Union of Public Employees and the Hospital Employees' Union.

After several unsuccessful attempts, her husband Derek was elected to the Burnaby City Council in 1987 and would serve as a city councillor until 2002 when he was elected mayor. Derek's enjoyment of being a councillor motivated Kathy to seek a public position, so she stood in Burnaby's (School District 41) 1999 school board election. She won a seat on the seven member board, coming in third in total votes. She was re-elected in the 2002 and 2005 elections, coming in first and second in total votes, respectively. She was elected, each year, by the board to be the vice-chair from 2003 to 2006, and then to be the chair of the board in 2007 and 2008. On school board issues, she resisted regionalization of school districts and public-private partnerships in service delivery. She had a dispute with Burnaby MLA Patty Sahota over what Corrigan believed was political interference and with a fellow board member who attributed good performance at school to specific ethnicities.

== Provincial politics ==
Prior to becoming an MLA, Corrigan worked as a policy researcher for the Canadian Union of Public Employees and the Hospital Employees' Union and as a lawyer previously. She graduated from the University of British Columbia Law School in 1978 and married fellow law student Derek Corrigan. After having their first child, Kathy decided to leave the law profession and become a homemaker. Derek went on to be elected to the Burnaby City Council in 1987 and become mayor in 2002, while Kathy was elected to the Burnaby School Board for three terms, between 1999 and 2008, where she also served as chair for two years.

In April 2008 she announced she would not be seeking reelection to the school board and several days later announced she would her intention to be a candidate for the BC New Democratic Party in the next provincial election. The Burnaby-Deer Lake riding was created in a boundary re-alignment with BC Liberal John Nuraney as its incumbent MLA. Corrigan was acclaimed the NDP candidate in October 2008. The riding was thought to be competitive for both the BC Liberals and NDP, as the boundary re-alignment and the incumbent MLA was believed to favour the BC Liberals, while Corrigan was considered a star candidate with name recognition from her time on the school board and with her husband winning re-election as mayor in November 2008. The salient issue of the election was the site selection of a proposed remand (prison) centre. The site, located in the Burnaby-Deer Lake riding, was opposed by both Kathy and Derek Corrigan. The NDP hosted a public event to oppose locating the remand centre at the selected site and Burnaby City Council issued a resolution stating their opposition. While the incumbent MLA Nuraney defended it, BC Solicitor-General John van Dongen announced the site selection would be re-considered with the advice of Metro Vancouver. In the general election, in May 2009, Corrigan defeated two-term BC Liberals candidate Nuraney and BC Green Party candidate and retired business consultant Bruce Friesen, though the BC Liberals won a renewed majority government, with the NDP as the official opposition.

As the 39th Parliament began, she was appointed to the Select Standing Committee on Public Accounts in all four sessions. NDP leader Carole James assigned Corrigan to be the critic for the 2010 Winter Olympics and ActNow BC, opposite Mary McNeil who was Minister of State for the Olympics and ActNow BC. Corrigan would later add critic for women's issues to her duties. On Olympic issues, she criticized the provincial government for planning to spend $30 million in bonuses for VANOC employees, though only half that was delivered due to a budget shortfall, and $1 million for tickets for MLAs and their guests while at the same time asking for lowering spending budget due to the 2008 recession. When the government claimed the Olympics had cost $925 million, which was $325 million over budget, Corrigan estimated that the actual cost was closer to $1.2 billion if indirect expenses, such as upgrades BC Place Stadium and the SkyTrain system, and the expenses associated with the 650 public service employees that were reassigned to the games, were factored in, and that VANOC should not have reported a balanced its budget with government transfers and crown sponsorships claimed as revenue. She also asked for provincial and federal government advocacy directed at VANOC and the IOC over their decision not to include females in the ski jumping event. Along with neighbouring NDP MLA Raj Chouhan, she co-wrote letters to editors and participated in public events opposing the Harmonized Sales Tax.

In Fall 2010, as an NDP caucus revolt unfolded, Corrigan remained loyal to party leader Carole James. When Norm Macdonald resigned as caucus chair in protest of James' leadership, James assigned Corrigan to that position. After attempts at reconciliation within the caucus failed and James resigned as leader, Corrigan called the loss upsetting and sad. Interim leader Dawn Black reassigned Corrigan to be their critic on Public Safety and Solicitor General. While both Kathy and Derek Corrigan were cited as being viable candidates in the subsequent BC NDP leadership election, both declined and, in January 2011, endorsed John Horgan. After Adrian Dix won the leadership election, he kept Corrigan in her role as critic on women's issues and on Public Safety and Solicitor General. She linked an $8 million cut to the court system in 2011, with the $6 million payment for legal fees to defend Dave Basi and Bob Virk in the BC Rail corruption case. She advocated that the province should cover the full costs of the 2011 Stanley Cup riot review, rather than cost-sharing with the Metro Vancouver municipalities and sought to have the Legislative Assembly join Ontario and Quebec in lobbying the federal government for funds to implement the proposed Safe Streets and Communities Act. Corrigan challenged the Minister of Social Development, and Burnaby-Lougheed MLA, Harry Bloy over cuts to Community Living BC after a Burnaby family, with a son living with autism and Down syndrome, who had their support withdrawn sought help from Corrigan's office. She also had a dispute with Christy Clark who had referred to a female NDP MLA as part of the NDP's "women's auxiliary", in reference to Clark's belief that the party did not allow women to speak on substantive issues in the Legislative Assembly, but which Corrigan found to be disrespectful towards the women in the NDP caucus.

Corrigan sought re-election in the 2013 provincial election. She was challenged by medical doctor Shian Gu for the BC Liberals and school teacher Rick McGowan for the BC Greens but was projected to easily win the riding. Following the election Dix adjusted the critic roles so that Corrigan would focus on issues related to public safety and the Solicitor General. Following Dix's resignation as party leader, and her husband Derek declining to run, Corrigan endorsed John Horgan in the 2014 British Columbia New Democratic Party leadership election. Once Horgan became leader he re-assigned Corrigan to be the critic on advanced education. Also that year, Derek won re-election as mayor of Burnaby. In 2016, the 62-year old Corrigan announced that she would not be seeking reelection in upcoming 2017 provincial election. In the subsequent election the NDP retained the seat with Anne Kang winning the riding.

== Electoral history ==
2013 British Columbia general election: Burnaby-Deer Lake
Party	Candidate	Votes	%	±%	Expenditures
New Democratic	Kathy Corrigan	8,189	48.48	−0.27	$102,395
Liberal	Shian Gu	7,286	43.13	−2.54	$82,445
Green	Richard (Rick) McGowan	1,417	8.39	+2.81	$465
Total valid votes		16,892	100.00	–	
Total rejected ballots		168	0.98	+0.05	
Turnout		17,060	48.03	−0.62	
Registered voters		35,520			
Source: Elections BC

2009 British Columbia general election: Burnaby-Deer Lake
Party	Candidate	Votes	%	Expenditures
New Democratic	Kathy Corrigan	8,103	48.75	$92,681
Liberal	John Nuraney	7,591	45.67	$116,999
Green	Bruce Friesen	928	5.58	$1,633
Total valid votes		16,622	100	
Total rejected ballots		156	0.93	
Turnout		16,778	48.65	
Registered voters		34,488		
