= Burnaby-Deer Lake =

Defunct provincial electoral district in British Columbia, Canada

Coordinates: 49°14′N 122°59′W

British Columbia electoral district
- Location in Burnaby

Defunct provincial electoral district
- Legislature: Legislative Assembly of British Columbia
- District created: 2008
- District abolished: 2024
- First contested: 2009
- Last contested: 2020

Demographics
- Population (2006): 52,730
- Area (km²): 13.75
- Census division(s): Metro Vancouver
- Census subdivision(s): Burnaby

Burnaby-Deer Lake is a former provincial electoral district in British Columbia, Canada, in use from 2009 to 2024.

Initially established by the Electoral Districts Act, 2008, it was first contested in the 2009 general election, in which BC New Democrat (BC NDP) member Kathy Corrigan was elected its first MLA; Anne Kang, also a BC NDP politician, won the seat in 2017 after Corrigan decided not to run for re-election that year.

Under the 2021 British Columbia electoral redistribution that took effect for the 2024 general election, the majority of the riding was re-allocated to the new, larger district of Burnaby Centre, with the southwestern portion being redistributed to Burnaby South-Metrotown.

== Members of the Legislative Assembly ==
Burnaby-Deer Lake
Assembly	Years	Member	Party
Riding created from Burnaby-Edmonds and Burnaby-Willingdon
39th	2009–2013	Kathy Corrigan	New Democratic
40th	2013–2017	Kathy Corrigan	New Democratic
41st	2017–2020	Anne Kang	New Democratic
42nd	2020–2024	Anne Kang	New Democratic

== Electoral history ==
2020 British Columbia general election
Party	Candidate	Votes	%	±%	Expenditures
New Democratic	Anne Kang	9,190	56.62	+8.73	$35,031.32
Liberal	Glynnis Hoi Sum Chan	5,163	31.81	−3.73	$0.00
Green	Mehreen Chaudry	1,878	11.57	−0.52	$1,332.72
Total valid votes		16,231	100.00	–	
Total rejected ballots					
Turnout					
Registered voters					
Source: Elections BC

2017 British Columbia general election
Party	Candidate	Votes	%	±%	Expenditures
New Democratic	Anne Kang	8,747	47.89	−0.59	$59,836.00
Liberal	Karen Xiao Bao Wang	6,491	35.54	−7.59	$69,149.01
Green	Rick McGowan	2,209	12.09	+3.70	$1,081.00
Conservative	Graham Bowers	589	3.23	–	$105.80
Independent	Elias Ishak	229	1.25	–	$3,349.14
Total valid votes		18,265	100.00	–	
Total rejected ballots		136	0.74	−0.24	
Turnout		18,401	53.00	+4.97	
Registered voters		34,716			
Source: Elections BC

2013 British Columbia general election
Party	Candidate	Votes	%	±%	Expenditures
New Democratic	Kathy Corrigan	8,189	48.48	−0.27	$102,395
Liberal	Shian Gu	7,286	43.13	−2.54	$82,445
Green	Richard (Rick) McGowan	1,417	8.39	+2.81	$465
Total valid votes		16,892	100.00	–	
Total rejected ballots		168	0.98	+0.05	
Turnout		17,060	48.03	−0.62	
Registered voters		35,520			
Source: Elections BC

2009 British Columbia general election
Party	Candidate	Votes	%	Expenditures
New Democratic	Kathy Corrigan	8,103	48.75	$92,681
Liberal	John Nuraney	7,591	45.67	$116,999
Green	Bruce Friesen	928	5.58	$1,633
Total valid votes		16,622	100	
Total rejected ballots		156	0.93	
Turnout		16,778	48.65	
Registered voters		34,488		

== See also ==
- List of British Columbia provincial electoral districts
- Canadian provincial electoral districts
