= Bill 28 =

Bill 28 may refer to:

- Bill 28 (British Columbia), a law meant to intervene in the housing market in an attempt to lower housing prices
- Bill 28 (Ontario), a now-repealed law that forbade Ontario public school workers from engaging in job action
