= Burnaby Centre =

Provincial electoral district in British Columbia, Canada

British Columbia electoral district
- Location in Burnaby

Provincial electoral district
- Legislature: Legislative Assembly of British Columbia
MLA
Joshua Domnich
Conservative
- District created: 2023
- First contested: 2024
- Last contested: 2026

Burnaby Centre is a provincial electoral district for the Legislative Assembly of British Columbia, Canada. Created under the 2021 British Columbia electoral redistribution, the riding was first contested in the 2024 British Columbia general election. It was created out of parts of Burnaby-Deer Lake, Burnaby North, and small parts of Burnaby-Lougheed and Burnaby-Edmonds.

== Geography ==
The district is located in the west half of the municipality, mostly lying between the Trans-Canada Highway to the north and Kingsway to the south. It contains the main British Columbia Institute of Technology campus and neighbourhoods such as Marlborough and Douglas-Gilpin.

== Members of the Legislative Assembly ==
Assembly	Years	Member	Party
Riding created out of parts of Burnaby-Deer Lake, Burnaby North, Burnaby-Lougheed, and Burnaby-Edmonds
43rd	2024–2026	Anne Kang	New Democratic
44th	2026–present	Joshua Domnich	Conservative

== Election results ==
2026 British Columbia general election
Party	Candidate	Votes	%	±%	Expenditures
Conservative	Joshua Domnich	6,735	47.18	+4.46	
New Democratic	Anne Kang	5,955	41.72	-15.56	
Green	Shila Taheri	1,169	8.19	-	
CentreBC	Vikas Gautam	370	2.59	-	
Total valid votes		14,229	99.68		
Total rejected ballots		46	0.32		
Turnout		14,275			
Registered voters					
Conservative gain from New Democratic		Swing		+10.01	
Source: Elections BC

2024 British Columbia general election
Party	Candidate	Votes	%	±%	Expenditures
New Democratic	Anne Kang	9,780	57.28	+0.7	$54,972.27
Conservative	Dharam Kajal	7,294	42.72	–	$24,538.33
Total valid votes/expense limit		17,074	99.37	–	$71,700.08
Total rejected ballots		108	0.63	–	
Turnout		17,182	50.11	–	
Registered voters		34,290			
New Democratic notional hold		Swing		−21.0	
Source: Elections BC

2020 provincial election redistributed results
Party	%
New Democratic	56.6
Liberal	31.8
Green	11.6

== See also ==
- List of British Columbia provincial electoral districts
- Canadian provincial electoral districts
