= 2025 Air Canada flight attendants strike =

Labor dispute between flight attendants and Air Canada

- Picket line at Toronto Pearson Airport
- Date: August 16–19, 2025 (3 days)
- Location: Canada
- Caused by: Failure to negotiate a new collective bargaining agreement
- Goals: Increased wages for flight attendants; Compensation for unpaid work
- Status: Tentative agreement reached on August 19, 2025. Some flights resume. 99.1% voting employees reject wage offer portion of agreement.

Parties
Air Canada	Canadian Union of Public Employees	Government of Canada: CIRB

Lead figures
Vagn Sørensen (chairman of the board of directors); Michael Rousseau (CEO)	Mark Hancock (president of the CUPE); Wesley Lesosky (president of CUPE's Air Canada component)	Mark Carney (prime minister); Patty Hajdu (minister of jobs and families); John Zerucelli (secretary of state for labour)

The 2025 Air Canada flight attendants strike refers to an ongoing labour dispute between 10,517 flight attendants working with the Canadian Union of Public Employees (CUPE), and Air Canada, that evolved into a strike from August 16–19, 2025. The strike affected flights on Air Canada and Air Canada Rouge, but not other brands under Air Canada Express, run by Jazz Aviation and PAL Airlines.

Jobs minister Patty Hajdu imposed binding arbitration, and the Canada Industrial Relations Board subsequently issued a return-to-work order, which was defied by the union. On August 19, both parties announced that they had arrived at a tentative agreement which would be subject to ratification by membership. Air Canada indicated it would start resuming flights from the same day. The vote by CUPE members to ratify the agreement began on August 27 and lasted until September 6, 2025, ending with 99.1% of voting employees rejecting the wage offer portion of the agreement.

== Background ==
The main issue that reportedly led to the strike is that Air Canada flight attendants are demanding pay for uncompensated work performed before takeoff and after landing, known in the industry as groundwork.

In the North American aviation industry, flight attendants traditionally are not paid until the cabin door is closed. According to CUPE, Air Canada's specific policy is to pay flight attendants from when the brakes are released at the departure airport to when they are applied on arrival. In other words, flight attendants traditionally do not earn pay for all the time they spend in airports waiting for their next flight, as well as the time it takes for passengers to board an aircraft and stow their hand luggage. If the flight is delayed, especially when the aircraft is sitting on the ground, those delays mean more unpaid time. CUPE estimated that Air Canada flight attendants perform about 35 hours of unpaid work each month.

Historically, this policy began in North America when airlines' narrow profit margins collapsed under the severe economic pressures of the late 1970s and early 1980s, especially on the American side of the border: the enacting of the Airline Deregulation Act, the early 1980s recession, and the 1981 air traffic controller strike. Trimming the hours for which flight attendants could be paid was one method by which financially struggling airlines could cut crew wages and benefits, which in turn led to strikes and low productivity.

For many years, flight attendants did not have enough bargaining power to demand boarding pay, because North American airlines were dealt severe financial blows by the September 11 attacks and then the Great Recession. It became an issue in the years after the COVID-19 pandemic, when airlines were once again profitable.

Over the years, flight delays had become much more severe, especially in Canadian airspace, which meant more unpaid work for Canadian crew members. According to Cirium, in 2024, only 71 percent of Air Canada flights landed on time, which meant that Air Canada and WestJet came in at the bottom of an annual ranking of North American carriers' on-time performance.

At the same time, flight attendants' duties had become more onerous. Airplanes in the years after COVID-19 have become more consistently crowded. The tendency of airlines to extract additional ancillary revenue by charging fees for checked baggage meant that more people were trying to bring carry-on baggage into the cabin. There was also an increase in air rage.

Skyrocketing inflation combined with stagnant wages "fueled resentment among flight attendants". Entry-level flight attendants realized their true hourly pay as computed against all hours actually worked was not that high at all. In the United States, entry-level flight attendants were seeing their true hourly pay drop towards state minimum wage, while CUPE claimed that pay for their Canadian counterparts was already coming in under Canadian minimum wage.

In 2022, Delta Air Lines was the first U.S. major carrier to provide partial pay for boarding time, in an apparent attempt to stave off unionization of its flight attendants. In 2024, American Airlines made a similar concession in negotiations with the union representing its flight attendants, as did Alaska Airlines. Then in 2025, United Airlines offered to pay for boarding time in negotiations with its flight attendants' union. In Canada, both Porter Airlines and Pascan Aviation already pay flight attendants for work during the boarding process.

== Negotiations ==
The previous collective bargaining agreement between Air Canada and CUPE (representing its flight attendants) was a 10-year agreement which ended in March 2025. As of August 2025, 99.7 percent of employees voted in favour of striking. On August 13, the union served Air Canada with a 72-hour strike notice, which responded with a 72-hour lockout notice. Expecting a strike, Air Canada began canceling flights in the following days, with 623 cancelled by the night of August 15 and all 700 from August 16. The day before the strike, the union rejected a request for arbitration from the airline, which also asked the government to force arbitration.

Air Canada said it had offered a 38 percent increase in compensation over four years with a 25 percent increase in the first year. CUPE said that the offer was "below inflation, below market value, below minimum wage" and only included 50 percent of wages for some currently unpaid work. It claimed it had been negotiating in good faith for over eight months prior and voiced disapproval over the airline's decision to involve the government. Reuters sources said that the union is looking for parity on wages with Air Transat, whose employees are the highest paid in the industry in Canada following a new contract in 2024.

== Strike ==
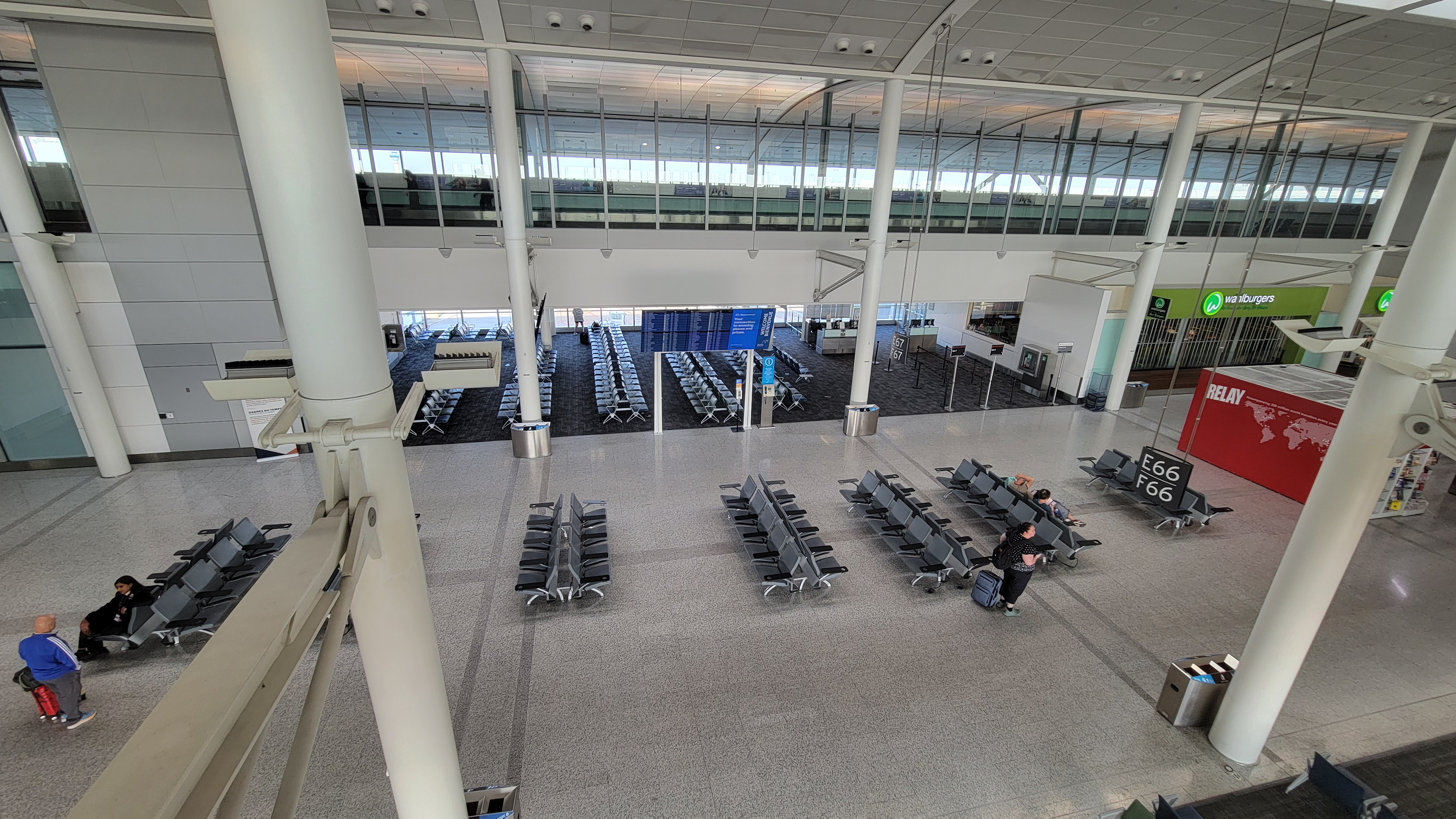
The Toronto Pearson International Airport Terminal 1 departure level during the strike

The strike began at 00:58 EDT (04:58 GMT) on August 16. All flights under both Air Canada and low-cost carrier Air Canada Rouge were suspended. Regional subsidiary Air Canada Express, operated by Jazz Aviation and PAL Airlines, remained operational. Picket lines were set up outside Toronto Pearson International Airport and union leaders encouraged picketing at other major Canadian airports.

The disruption was expected to affect 130,000 passengers per day. Air Canada allowed affected passengers to postpone their booking from August 21 without a fee. The airline also started booking passengers on other carriers depending on availability, including Star Alliance partner United Airlines. Air Canada told passengers to not come to airports unless they had already confirmed new reservations on other airlines, and to wait to be contacted about their travel options. Passengers who needed to travel immediately faced long hold times on the airline's overwhelmed telephone lines and went to airports anyway in search of assistance. The strike was especially inconvenient for passengers in Calgary International Airport. The strike coincided with the Country Thunder music festival, meaning that all hotels and flights in the Calgary area were fully booked for several days. Passengers attempting to rebook on August 16 were told that the earliest available day for leaving Calgary on other airlines was August 19.

A few hours after the strike began, jobs minister Patty Hajdu announced that she had exercised her right under Section 107 of the Canada Labour Code to direct the Canada Industrial Relations Board (CIRB) to force arbitration and end the strike. She further explained that it would take 24 to 48 hours for the board to issue a back-to-work order, and that Air Canada had indicated it would need five to ten days to resume normal operations. Striking flight attendants on the picket lines were furious at Hajdu upon learning the news. CUPE's president of the Air Canada division, Wesley Lesosky, said in a statement: "The Liberals are violating our charter rights to take job action and giving Air Canada exactly what they want — hours and hours of unpaid labour from underpaid flight attendants". CIRB ordered the flight attendants to return to work at 14:00 EDT on August 17, and Air Canada announced that they would start resuming flights in response. However, the union called the return-to-work order unconstitutional and vowed to continue the strike, which resulted in a further cancellation of the planned flights. On August 18, the CIRB declared the continuation of the strike illegal and ordered a return to work by noon. CUPE national president Mark Hancock refused to comply and added: "If it means folks like me going to jail, then so be it. If it means our union being fined, then so be it." Labour experts noted that Canadian unions had not been this defiant since 1978, when the federal government arrested all national officials of the Canadian Union of Postal Workers after they openly defied a back-to-work order and threw union leader Jean-Claude Parrot in jail.

On August 19, CUPE announced that they had reached a tentative agreement that would bring "transformational change" to the industry and ended the strike, following nine hours of overnight talks with a mediator appointed by the government. As details of the tentative agreement emerged, Air Canada's concession on the issue of pay for groundwork was seen by analysts as part of a larger trend that would likely spread to other North American airlines. Hancock noted that "it's not something that we're going to let go of" and that CUPE would raise the issue of ground pay in upcoming negotiations with other airlines, such as WestJet.

=== Rejection of wage offer ===
Voting on the ratification of the tentative labour agreement between Air Canada, Air Canada Rouge and CUPE began on August 27, 2025 and concluded on September 6, 2025. On September 6, the union announced that 99.4% of members took part in the vote, and that the wage offer portion of the agreement was rejected by 99.1% of those who voted. It was agreed upon that should the tentative agreement be rejected, flights attendants could not strike or disrupt services. The union said negotiations are now in mediation.

== Recovery ==
Air Canada began to restart operations gradually on the evening of August 19. BBC estimates suggested that over 500,000 passengers had been impacted by August 19. Some flight delays were also still acknowledged to be ongoing. Air Canada chief operations officer Mark Nasr estimated that over 100,000 Canadians had been stranded by the strike who were still trying to get home, and explained in an interview that the airline would need 7 to 10 days to restore normal flight operations. The strike resulted in a total of 3200 flight cancellations, causing a C$430 million loss of revenue.
