= Fred Vulliamy =

Canadian politician

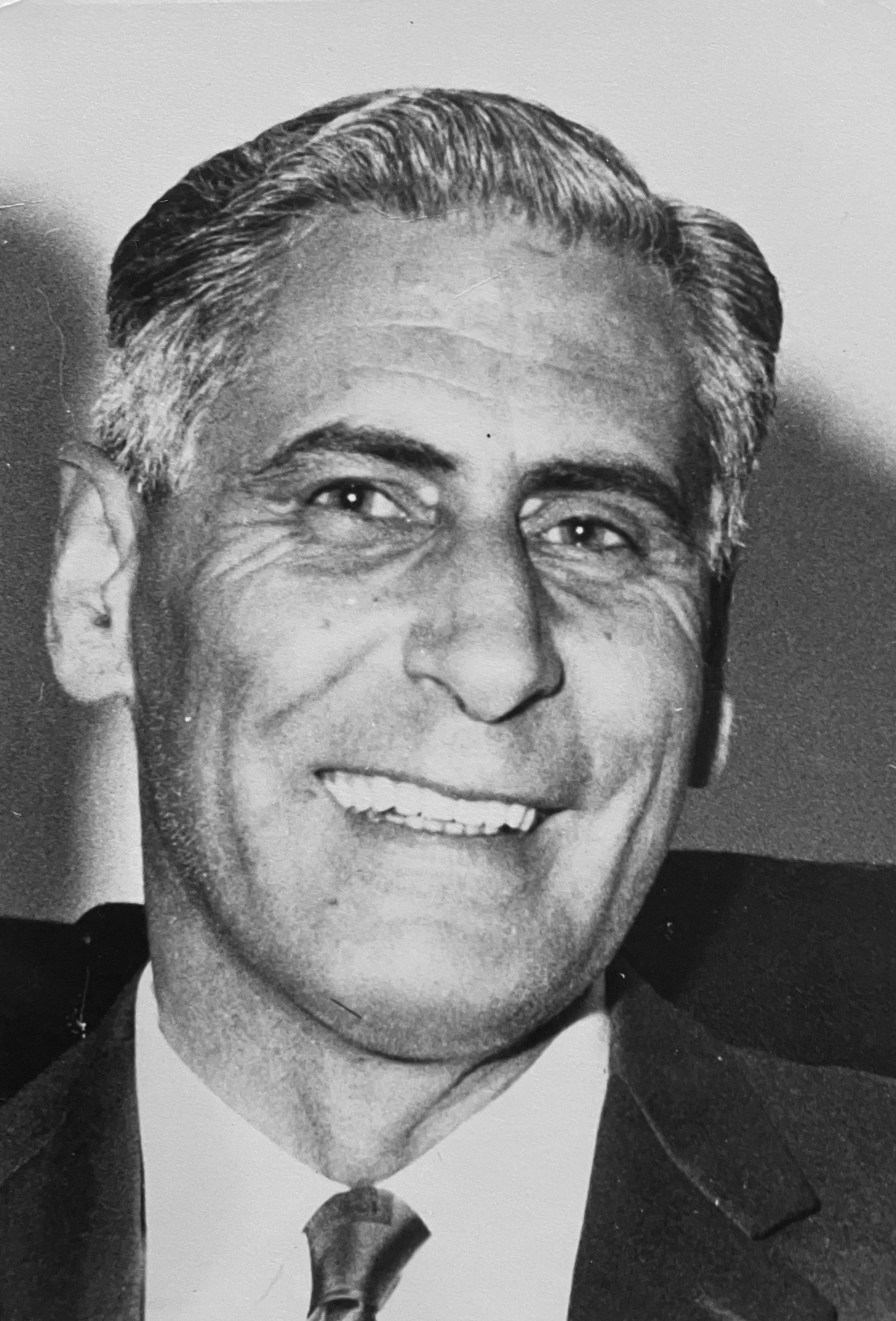

MLA for Burnaby-Willingdon
- Succeeded by: James Gibson Lorimer
- In office 1966–1968

President of the BCNDP
- In office 1962–1963
- Preceded by: Thomas R. Berger
- Succeeded by: Jack Mackenzie

Personal details
- Born: Winnipeg, Manitoba, Canada
- Died: Burnaby, British Columbia, Canada
- Party: New Democratic Party
- Occupation: Politician, Accountant

Frederick Justin Vulliamy (1913 – October 20, 1968) was a Canadian chartered accountant and politician in British Columbia. He represented Burnaby-Willingdon in the Legislative Assembly of British Columbia from 1966 to 1968 as a New Democratic Party (NDP) member. He was born in Winnipeg and came to Vancouver, British Columbia with his family five years later. Vulliamy worked for the Alaska Pine Company for three years as an accountant before setting up his own practice. He was elected provincial president of the NDP in 1962. He was a director and later president of the Kitsilano Ratepayers' Association. Vulliamy was an unsuccessful candidate in the provincial ridings of Vancouver Burrard in 1960 and Vancouver Centre in 1963. In 1964 he moved to Burnaby and was elected to the Legislature in the 1966 provincial election. Vulliamy died in office two years later.

== Election record ==
1966 British Columbia general election : Burnaby-Willingdon
Party	Candidate	Votes	%
New Democrat	Fred Vulliamy	6,153	44.47%
Social Credit	Charles MacSorley	5,629	40.69%
Liberal	James Clark	2,053	14.84%

1963 British Columbia General Election : Vancouver Centre
Party	Candidate	Votes	%	±	Expenditures
Social Credit	Leslie Raymond Peterson	8,060	20.26	–	unknown
Social Credit	Alexander Small Matthew	7,594	19.09	–	unknown
New Democratic	John M. Norris	5,806	14.60		unknown
New Democratic	Fred Vulliamy	5,538	13.92		unknown
Liberal	Thomas Warnett Kennedy	3,477	8.74		unknown
Liberal	Alexander Forst	3,467	8.72		unknown
Progressive Conservative	Harold G. Haggart	2,741	6.89		unknown
Progressive Conservative	Arthur L. Johnson	2,588	6.51		unknown
Communist	Ronald J. Forkin	266	0.67		unknown
Communist	William E. Stewart	240	0.60		unknown
Total valid votes		39,777	100.00		
Total rejected ballots		419			
Turnout		%			

1960 British Columbia general election: Vancouver-Burrard
Party	Candidate	Votes	%	Elected
Social Credit	Eric Martin	10,642	18.9	✓
Social Credit	Bert Price	10,231	18.1	✓
Co-operative Commonwealth	Neale	9,505	16.9	
Co-operative Commonwealth	Vulliamy	9,333	16.6	
Liberal	Kearney	5,715	10.1	
Liberal	Lyon	5,744	10.2	
Progressive Conservative	Sturdy	2,611	4.6	
Progressive Conservative	Thomas	1,904	3.4	
Communist	Edwards	339	0.6	
Communist	Samuelson	271	0.5	
Independent	Finkleman	87	0.2	
Total valid votes		56,382	100.00	
Total rejected ballots		621	1.1	
Turnout		29,534	50.6	
