= Grace Hartman =

Grace Hartman may refer to:

- Grace Hartman (politician) (1900–1998), first female mayor of Sudbury, Ontario (and one of the earliest in all of Canada)
- Grace Hartman (trade unionist) (1918–1993), former president of the Canadian Union of Public Employees and the first woman to lead a major labour union in North America
- Grace Hartman (actress) (1907–1955), 1940s Broadway actress
- Grace Hartman (runner) (born 2004), American long-distance runner
