= HEU =

HEU may refer to:

- Harbin Engineering University, in Harbin, China
- Highly enriched uranium, uranium that is 20% or more U235
- Hospital Employees' Union, trade union in British Columbia, Canada
