= James Gibson Lorimer =

Canadian politician (1923-2012)

Jim Lorimer
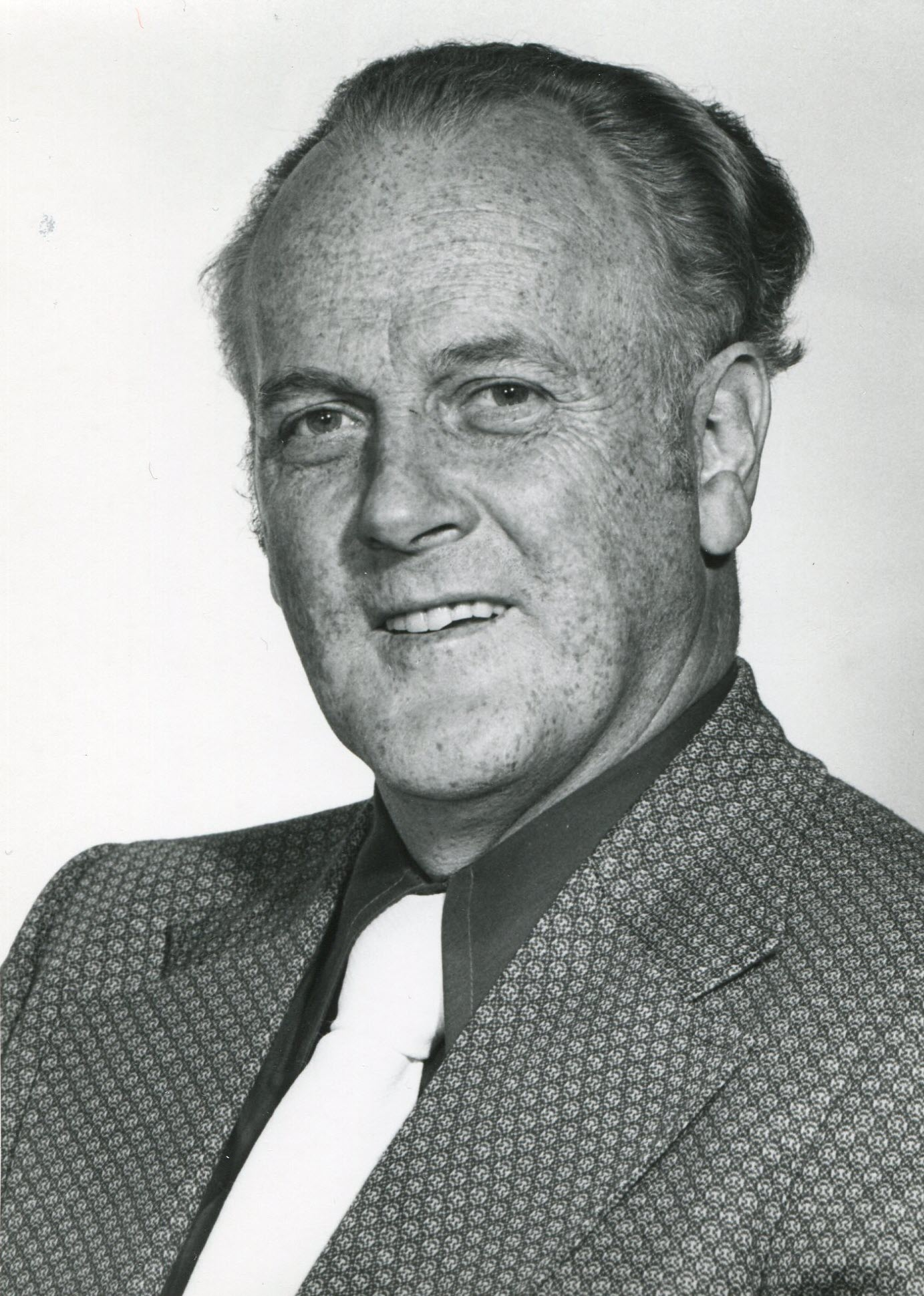

Member of the British Columbia Legislative Assembly for Burnaby-Willingdon
- In office May 10, 1979 – May 5, 1983
- Preceded by: Elwood Veitch
- Succeeded by: Elwood Veitch
- In office January 13, 1969 – December 11, 1975
- Preceded by: Fred Vulliamy
- Succeeded by: Elwood Veitch

Personal details
- Born: June 3, 1923 Victoria, British Columbia
- Died: October 25, 2012 (aged 89) British Columbia
- Party: New Democratic
- Profession: Lawyer

James Gibson "Jim" Lorimer (June 3, 1923 – October 25, 2012) was a lawyer and politician in British Columbia. He served in the Legislative Assembly of British Columbia from 1969 to 1975 and from 1979 to 1983 as a member of the New Democratic Party.

Lorimer was born in Victoria, British Columbia and served overseas with The Canadian Scottish Regiment during World War II. After the war, Lorimer worked as a longshoreman, fisherman, and shipyard worker while studying law at the University of British Columbia. He practised in Grand Forks and Vancouver.

Lorimer was an unsuccessful candidate in the riding of Vancouver Quadra in the 1957 federal election. He served on the municipal council of Burnaby from 1966 to 1968.

He was first elected to the provincial assembly in a 1969 by-election held following the death of Fred Vulliamy. He was re-elected in 1969 and 1972, defeated in 1975, re-elected in 1979 and defeated again in 1983. Under Premier Dave Barrett he served as Minister of Municipal Affairs and Minister of Commercial Transport. He was a director for BC Hydro and chairman for the BC Harbours Board.

Jim Lorimer Park in Burnaby was named in his honour. He died in 2012.
