= Joan Sawicki =

Canadian politician

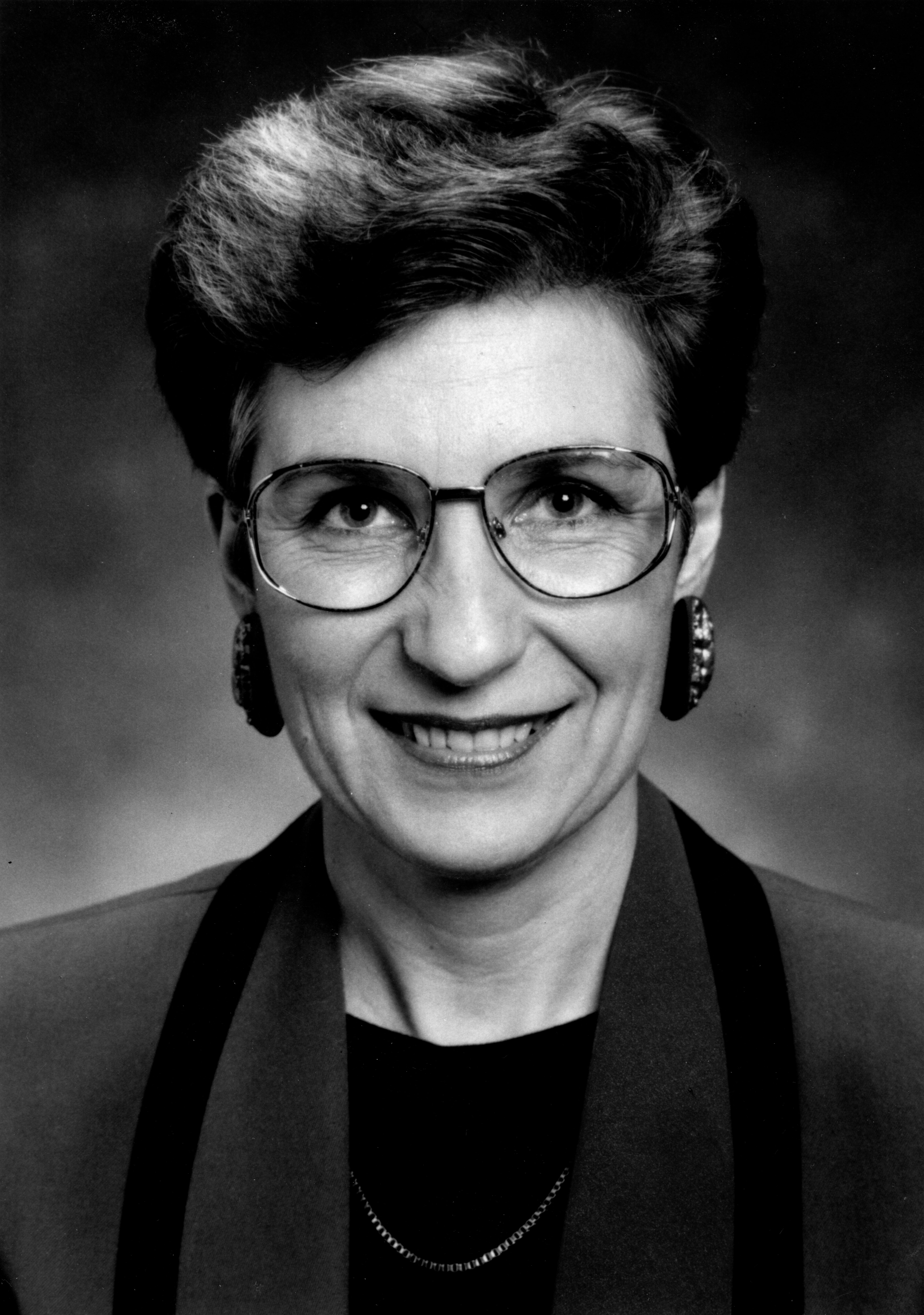

30th Speaker of the Legislative Assembly of British Columbia
- In office March 17, 1992 – March 21, 1994
- Preceded by: Stephen Rogers
- Succeeded by: Emery Barnes

Member of the Legislative Assembly for Burnaby-Willingdon
- In office October 7, 1991 – May 16, 2001
- Preceded by: Elwood Veitch
- Succeeded by: John Nuraney

Minister of Environment, Lands and Parks of British Columbia
- In office July 21, 1999 – November 1, 2000
- Premier: Glen Clark; Dan Miller; Ujjal Dosanjh
- Preceded by: Cathy McGregor
- Succeeded by: Ian Waddell

Personal details
- Born: September 18, 1945 (age 80)
- Party: New Democratic

Joan Marie Sawicki (born September 18, 1945) is a former Canadian politician. She served as a NDP Member of the Legislative Assembly of British Columbia from 1991 to 2001, representing Burnaby-Willingdon. She served as Speaker of the Legislative Assembly from 1992 to 1994, and as Minister of Environment, Lands and Parks from 1999 to 2000.

== Background ==
Sawicki was born in Burnaby, BC in 1945. She attended the University of Victoria earning a B.A. in Education in 1968. Sawicki was a secondary school teacher, a civil servant, and a land-use consultant prior to holding elected offices.

== Political career ==
Sawicki was elected to the Burnaby City Council in 1987 and served one term. She chaired the environment and waste management committee and sat as a municipal representative on both the Greater Vancouver Regional District waste management committee and the Metropolitan Board of Health.

Sawicki was the NDP candidate in the riding of Burnaby-Willingdon in the 1986 provincial election but was defeated by Elwood Veitch, a minister in the Social Credit government. She was elected in the same riding in 1991, and re-elected in 1996.

Sawicki was elected Speaker of the Legislative Assembly in March 1992, serving for two years. She was forced to resign as Speaker by Premier Mike Harcourt in 1994. She then served as Parliamentary Secretary to the Minister of Municipal Affairs from April 1994 to May 1996, and to the Minister of Environment, Lands and Parks from June 1996 to January 1998. She resigned from her position over issues concerning a proposed land development project that was to take place on protected land under the Agricultural Land Reserve at Six Mile Ranch near Kamloops.

In July 1999, Glen Clark named Sawicki to cabinet as Minister of Environment, Lands, and Parks. She retained her portfolio under Premier Dan Miller and when Ujjal Dosanjh became premier. She announced in October 2000 that she would not seek re-election, and relinquished her portfolio on November 1, 2000.
