= Judy Darcy =

Canadian politician (born 1950)

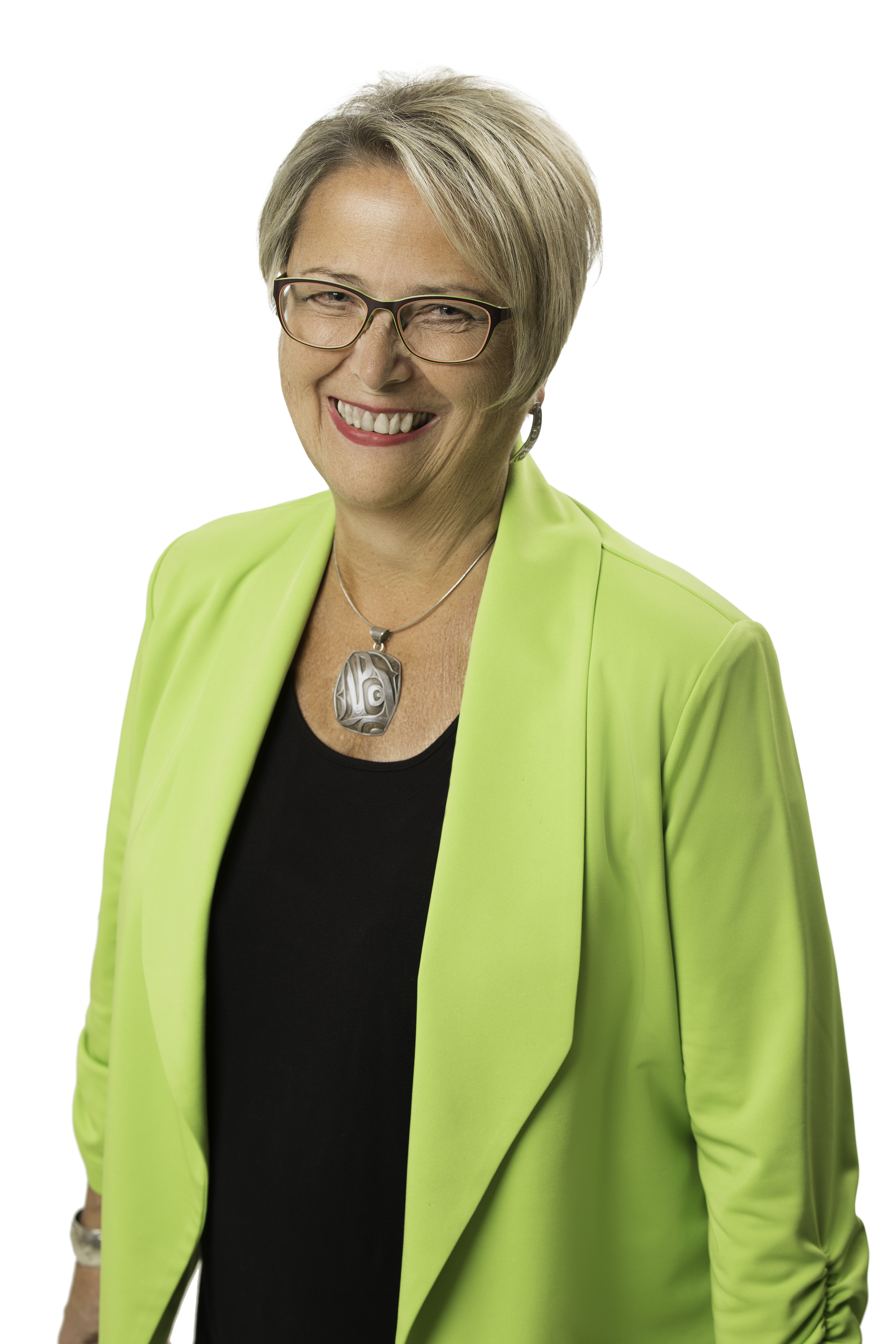

Minister of Mental Health and Addictions of British Columbia
- In office July 18, 2017 – November 26, 2020
- Premier: John Horgan
- Preceded by: Position established
- Succeeded by: Sheila Malcolmson

Member of the British Columbia Legislative Assembly for New Westminster
- In office May 14, 2013 – September 21, 2020
- Preceded by: Dawn Black
- Succeeded by: Jennifer Whiteside

4th National President of the Canadian Union of Public Employees
- In office 1991–2003
- Preceded by: Jeff Rose
- Succeeded by: Paul Moist

National Secretary-Treasurer of the Canadian Union of Public Employees
- In office 1989–1991

Personal details
- Born: Ida Maria Judith Borunsky; 1950 (age 75–76) Denmark
- Party: New Democratic (1985–present)
- Other political affiliations: Workers' Communist (before 1985)
- Education: York University

Judy Darcy (born 1950) is a Canadian health care advocate, trade unionist, and former politician. Darcy was the first Minister of Mental Health and Addictions of British Columbia. She was the fourth National President of the Canadian Union of Public Employees from 1991 until 2003, making her the second woman and second Jewish-Canadian to hold the post, and business manager of the Hospital Employees' Union from 2005 to 2011.

Darcy was elected to the Legislative Assembly of British Columbia in the 2013 election, as a BC NDP candidate for the provincial constituency of New Westminster. She held this position until September 2020, and did not seek a third term in the 2020 provincial election.

== Early life ==
Darcy was born Ida Maria Judith Borunsky in Denmark, and came to Canada with her parents when she was 18 months old. Her father was a research chemist who worked as a shipping clerk for years until he could re-establish his credentials in Canada and resume work in his profession.

Her father, Jules (Youli) Simonovich Borunsky, was a Russian Jew whose family had moved to France following the Russian Revolution. Borunsky's first wife was a French Catholic woman. During the war he enlisted in the French Army and was taken prisoner during the Battle of Dunkirk. During his detention as a Prisoner of War, he survived and avoided deportation to a concentration camp by hiding his Jewishness and pretending to be a devout Catholic, including Catholic references and symbols in his letters to his wife as part of the ruse. With Paris occupied by the Nazis, Borunsky convinced his father that it would be safer for him to join the rest of the family in Kovno, Lithuania. However, four days after he arrived, the town was invaded by the Nazis. Einsatzgruppen murdered most of the Jewish population, presumably including Borunsky's father, sister, her husband and their daughter. According to Darcy, her father "carried tremendous guilt, the guilt of having survived when others died and the guilt of having sent his father to his death." Borunsky's first wife died of illness around the end of the war. Borunsky, after being liberated, worked as deputy director of a United Nations Refugee Agency displaced persons camp where he met Else Margrethe Rich, a veteran of the Danish resistance movement who found work on the staff of the camp after the war. Traumatized by the war and the loss of his family, and afraid of further anti-Semitic oppression, Borunsky continued to hide his Jewishness from everyone except for his wife until late in his life.

Borunsky and Rich married and moved to Denmark where Darcy was born in 1950. Darcy and her sister and brother were all baptized in the Russian Orthodox Church but were not raised in any faith. The family emigrated to Canada in 1951, and settled in Sarnia where Borunsky found work in the petrochemical industry. When she was 8, her parents changed the family's name to Darcy as her father wanted a French sounding name. After his retirement, her father started attending Holy Blossom synagogue and the Bernard Betel Centre for Creative Living in order to rekindle his Jewish roots and gradually revealed his story to his children.

Darcy was raised in Sarnia, and moved to Toronto to study political science at York University, but quit after 1½ years. While she was still a student, Darcy infiltrated the Miss Canadian University Pageant and yelled "It's true it's a meat market and they do exploit women!" as the winner was announced. After traveling and doing odd jobs, she became a University of Toronto library clerk in 1972 and became active in CUPE.

== Union activism ==
In her youth, Darcy was active with the Workers' Communist Party of Canada, a Maoist group, and was a candidate for the party in the 1981 Ontario provincial election in the Toronto riding of St. Andrew—St. Patrick. By 1985, she had left the party and joined the New Democratic Party, saying of her earlier radicalism "I'm older, I don't think we're going to remake the world, but we've got to change what we can."

In 1983, she became a regional vice-president of the union's Ontario division and was also working at the Metropolitan Toronto Reference Library.

By the mid-1980s, she was president of the Metro Toronto Council of CUPE.

In 1986, she ran for the position of Ontario president of CUPE, challenging 10-year incumbent Lucie Nicholson. She was unsuccessful, losing by a margin of 318–240, her defeat blamed on a red-baiting campaign by the union's leadership. Darcy, however, did manage to retain a spot on the union's executive board topping the slate of "member at large" positions.

By 1988, she was first vice-president of CUPE's Ontario division, as well as a vice-president of the Ontario Federation of Labour. In 1989, she successfully ran for the position of national secretary-treasurer of CUPE, the union's number two position, saying that she stood for strong leadership to help CUPE cope with "some of the incredibly difficult challenges we'll see in the next few years, especially in light of free trade."

In the 1988 federal election, Darcy was the NDP's candidate against Liberal Frank Stronach and Progressive Conservative John E. Cole in York—Simcoe placing a "distant third" in the suburban Toronto riding.

In 1991, she was elected CUPE national president taking over the 406,000 member trade union. By the time she retired 13 years later the union had grown to 525,000 members.

== Electoral record ==
2017 British Columbia general election: New Westminster
Party	Candidate	Votes	%	±%	Expenditures
New Democratic	Judy Darcy	14,377	51.93	+3.09	$64,541
Green	Jonina Campbell	6,939	25.07	+16.72	$31,266
Liberal	Lorraine Brett	5,870	21.20	−12.17	$24,848
Social Credit	James Crosty	298	1.08	–	$3,877
Libertarian	Rex Brocki	199	0.72	+0.02	$0
Total valid votes		27,683	100.00	–	
Total rejected ballots		108	0.39	−0.10	
Turnout		27,791	63.61	+5.80	
Registered voters		43,690			
Source: Elections BC

2013 British Columbia general election: New Westminster
Party	Candidate	Votes	%	±%	Expenditures
New Democratic	Judy Darcy	13,170	48.84	−7.52	$126,704
Liberal	Hector Bremner	8,997	33.37	−1.24	$56,036
Green	Terry Teather	2,252	8.35	−0.68	$1,417
Conservative	Paul Forseth	1,318	4.89	−	$1,450
Independent	James Crosty	1,038	3.85	−	#3,530
Libertarian	Lewis Dahlby	190	0.70	−	$250
Total valid votes		26,965	100.00		
Total rejected ballots		132	0.49		
Turnout		27,097	57.81		
Source: Elections BC

1988 Canadian federal election: York—Simcoe
Party	Candidate	Votes	%
Progressive Conservative	John E. Cole	26,732	47.2
Liberal	Frank Stronach	19,906	35.1
New Democratic	Judy Darcy	7,489	13.2
Christian Heritage	Klass Stel	2,203	3.9
Libertarian	Maureen E. McAleese	335	0.6
Total valid votes		56,665	100.0

1981 Ontario general election: St. Andrew—St. Patrick
Party	Candidate	Votes	Vote %
Progressive Conservative	Larry Grossman	10,477	48.2
Liberal	Anne Johnston	6,743	31.0
New Democrat	Stan Kutz	4,002	18.4
Independent	Judy Darcy	262	1.2
Communist	J. McClure	150	0.7
Independent	Sophia Firth	96	0.4
	Total	21,730	

== After CUPE ==
Darcy subsequently moved to British Columbia and ran for the provincial British Columbia New Democratic Party nomination in Vancouver-Fairview, but was upset by businessman Gregor Robertson by a margin of 76 votes on the second ballot.

In February 2005, Darcy returned to work in the trade union movement, acquiring a position as secretary-business manager and chief negotiator with British Columbia's Hospital Employees' Union. She was known as being on the left of the union and an advocate of issues such as employment equity and childcare. She resigned from this position in September 2011 in preparation for her candidacy in the 2013 BC provincial election in New Westminster. She celebrated her election as New Westminster's Member of the Legislative Assembly at the Heritage Grill. At this party, Darcy led attendees in chanting "NDP".

In 2025, Darcy published her memoir Leading from the Heart: The Battles of a Feminist, Union Leader and Politician with Douglas & McIntyre.

British Columbia provincial government of John Horgan
Cabinet post (1)
Predecessor	Office	Successor
Ministry Established	Minister of Mental Health and Addiction; July 18, 2017 – November 26, 2020	Sheila Malcolmson
