= John Nuraney =

Canadian politician

Member of the British Columbia Legislative Assembly for Burnaby-Willingdon
- In office May 16, 2001 – May 12, 2009
- Preceded by: Joan Sawicki
- Succeeded by: Riding Abolished

Personal details
- Born: October 31, 1937 Mombasa, Kenya
- Died: November 21, 2016 (aged 79) Surrey, British Columbia
- Party: Liberal
- Occupation: Politician & businessman

John Nuraney (October 31, 1937 – November 21, 2016) was a Canadian politician who was the first Muslim elected as a Member of the Legislative Assembly of British Columbia. He represented the riding of Burnaby-Willingdon from 2001 to 2009 for the British Columbia Liberal Party.

Nuraney first contested the riding of Burnaby-Willingdon in 1996, challenging former Speaker Joan Sawicki. He lost by 823 votes. Upon Sawicki's retirement in 2001, Nuraney captured the riding by over 5000 votes in 2001.

In the 2009 election, Nuraney stood for re-election in the new district of Burnaby-Deer Lake, but was defeated by New Democrat Kathy Corrigan.

== Personal life ==
Nuraney was born in Kenya, and worked in London, Zurich and Zaire as an insurance professional. He immigrated to Canada from Zaire in 1974 after his assets and business were nationalized by the Zairian government in 1973.

His business investments in Canada included five A&W Restaurant franchises.

After his retirement due to the 2009 election loss, he moved from Burnaby to Surrey, British Columbia. Nuraney served as vice-president for the federal Liberal party's electoral district association for Cloverdale-Langley City.

Nuraney spoke six languages: English, French, Swahili, Lingala, Hindi and Gujarati.

He and his wife Gulshan had three children, Nick, Asim and Naseem. One of whom was a federal minister's assistant then a communications executive at Fraser Health.

Nuraney died at the age of 79 on November 21, 2016.

== Electoral history ==
B.C. General Election 1996: Burnaby-Willingdon
| Party | Candidate | Votes | % | ± | Expenditures |
|---|---|---|---|---|---|
| New Democratic | Joan Sawicki | 10,501 | 45.54% | | $35,882 |
| Liberal | John Nuraney | 9,678 | 41.97% | | $46,603 |
| Progressive Democrat | Thomas Reekie | 1,161 | 5.03% | – | $210 |
| Reform | Sunny G. Sodhi | 999 | 4.33% | | $28,321 |
| Green | Joe Keithley | 458 | 1.99% | – | $160 |
| Conservative | Peter B. MacDonald | 190 | 0.82% | | $100 |
| Natural Law | Henriette Toth | 74 | 0.32% | | $134 |
| Total valid votes | | 23,061 | 100.00% | | |
| Total rejected ballots | | 183 | 0.79% | | |
| Turnout | | 23,244 | 71.73% | | |

2001 British Columbia general election: Burnaby-Willingdon
| Party | Candidate | Votes | % | Expenditures |
|---|---|---|---|---|
| Liberal | John Nuraney | 10,207 | 55.79 | $46,187 |
| New Democratic | Dave Myles | 4,608 | 25.19 | $18,928 |
| Green | Joe Keithley | 2,879 | 15.74 | $2,419 |
| Marijuana | Pamela Zak | 362 | 1.98 | $394 |
| Council of British Columbians | Dennis MacAuley | 240 | 1.30 | $190 |
| Total valid votes | | 18,296 | 100.00 | |
| Total rejected ballots | | 158 | 0.86 | |
| Turnout | | 18,454 | 70.07 | |

2005 British Columbia general election: Burnaby-Willingdon
| Party | Candidate | Votes | % | Expenditures |
|---|---|---|---|---|
| Liberal | John Nuraney | 8,754 | 44.00 | $51,211 |
| New Democratic | Gabriel Yiu | 8,355 | 42.00 | $43,004 |
| Green | Pauline Farrell | 1,482 | 7.45 | $225 |
| Democratic Reform | Tony Kuo | 947 | 4.76 | $1,752 |
| Marijuana | John Warrens | 214 | 1.08 | $0 |
| Independent | Tom Tao | 142 | 0.71 | $0 |
| Total | | 19,894 | 100.00 | |

2009 British Columbia general election: Burnaby-Deer Lake
| Party | Candidate | Votes | % | Expenditures |
|---|---|---|---|---|
| New Democratic | Kathy Corrigan | 8,103 | 48.75 | $92,681 |
| Liberal | John Nuraney | 7,591 | 45.67 | $116,999 |
| Green | Bruce Friesen | 928 | 5.58 | $1,633 |
| Total valid votes | | 16,622 | 100 | |
| Total rejected ballots | | 156 | 0.93 | |
| Turnout | | 16,778 | 48.65 | |
| Registered voters | | 34,488 | | |
