= Jeff Rose =

Canadian trade unionist (born 1946)

Ontario Deputy Minister of Intergovernmental Affairs
- In office 1991–1995
- Minister: Bob Rae

3rd National President of the Canadian Union of Public Employees
- In office 1983–1991
- Preceded by: Grace Hartman
- Succeeded by: Judy Darcy

Personal details
- Born: 1946 (age 79–80) Toronto, Ontario, Canada
- Occupation: City planner, trade unionist, public administrator

Jeffrey "Jeff" Raymond Rose (born 1946) is a Canadian trade unionist and former public servant. He is national president emeritus of the Canadian Union of Public Employees, having served as national president of CUPE from 1983–1991, and was deputy minister of intergovernmental affairs for the government of Ontario from 1991 to 1995.

== Union representative ==
Rose was born in Toronto, and is Jewish. He began his career as a city planner in the City of Toronto government and in 1976 became active with his local union, CUPE Local 79, which represents City of Toronto inside workers. In 1980 he was elected president of Local 79 and in the next two years negotiated collective agreements containing across-the-board wage increases that totaled 26.5%. These bargaining achievements, and campaigns around working conditions and short-staffing in homes for the aged and around waste disposal and landfill in Toronto that he conducted for Local 79, brought him to the attention of CUPE locals on a national scale. In 1983, with rank-and-file support from a wide spectrum of locals, Rose ran from the floor of the CUPE national convention and was elected national president, succeeding Grace Hartman.

Rose’s years as national president of CUPE were marked by national membership growth from 294,000 members to 407,000 members (largely through organizing); a strengthening of CUPE’s infrastructure, staff capabilities, and rank-and-file skills; and his outspoken opposition to Brian Mulroney-era wage restraint, free trade, the GST, privatization, deregulation, and cuts to public services. Under Rose’s leadership CUPE was particularly effective in improving pay and working conditions for women.

== Provincial politics ==
In 1991 Rose declined to run for a fifth term and was appointed deputy minister of intergovernmental affairs in the Ontario New Democratic Party government of Bob Rae. He was named national president emeritus of CUPE and was succeeded by Judy Darcy. As deputy minister Rose was the lead negotiator and senior policy strategist for Ontario in its relations with the federal government and with the other provincial governments.

== University position; Comment on anti-semitism ==
He held the position until 1995, when he moved to the University of Toronto and was named a senior fellow on conflict management and negotiation. He retired in 2002.

The same year, Rose wrote an op-ed piece with lawyer Clayton Ruby and physician Philip Berger calling on their fellow leftists to denounce the antisemitism of "an increasingly vocal part" of the Canadian left.

Preceded by Grace Hartman	National President of the Canadian Union of Public Employees; 1983–1991	Succeeded by Judy Darcy
