= Anne Kang =

Canadian politician

- 康安禮
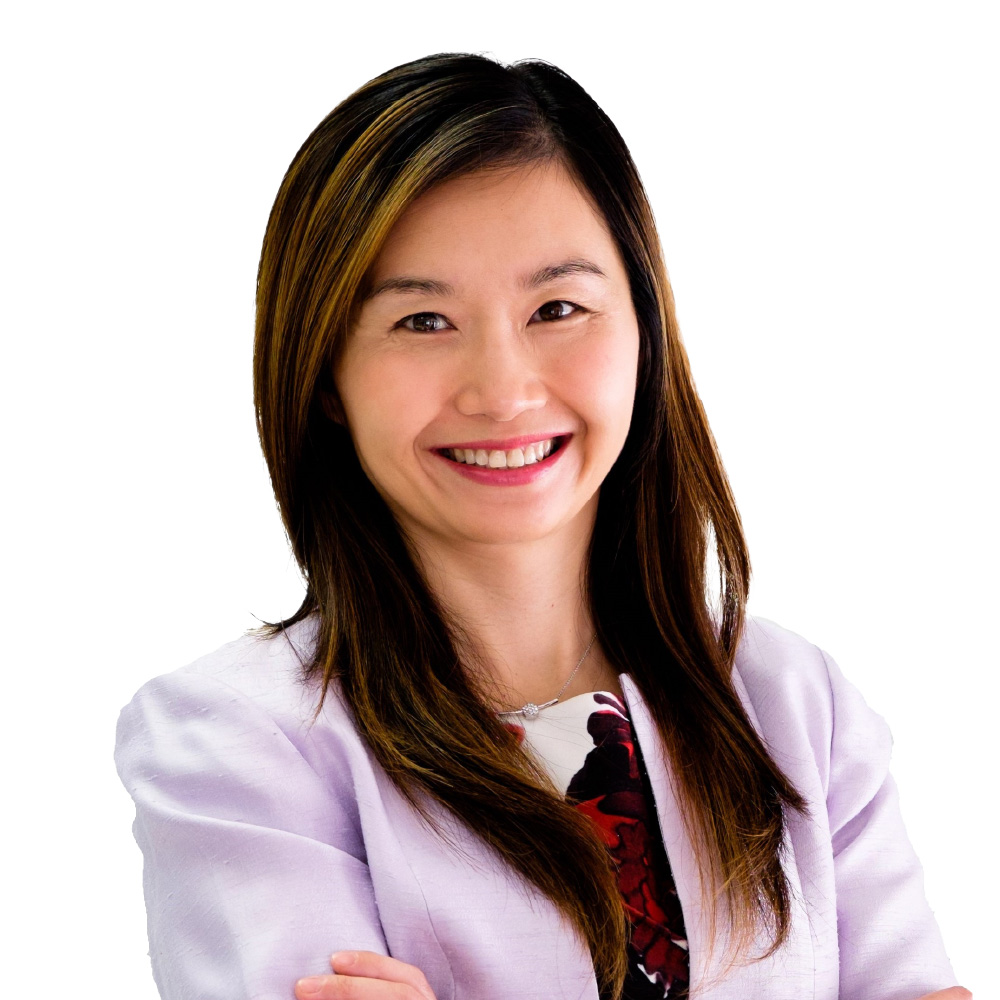
- Campaign portrait, 2024

Minister of Tourism, Arts, Culture and Sport of British Columbia
- In office July 17, 2025 – November 20, 2026
- Premier: David Eby
- Preceded by: Spencer Chandra Herbert

Minister of Post-Secondary Education and Future Skills of British Columbia
- In office November 18, 2024 – July 17, 2025
- Premier: David Eby
- Preceded by: Lisa Beare
- Succeeded by: Jessie Sunner
- In office November 26, 2020 – December 7, 2022
- Premier: John Horgan
- Preceded by: Melanie Mark
- Succeeded by: Selina Robinson

Minister of Municipal Affairs of British Columbia
- In office December 7, 2022 – November 18, 2024
- Premier: David Eby
- Preceded by: Nathan Cullen
- Succeeded by: Ravi Kahlon (Housing and Municipal Affairs)

Minister of Citizens' Services of British Columbia
- In office January 22, 2020 – November 26, 2020
- Premier: John Horgan
- Preceded by: Selina Robinson
- Succeeded by: Lisa Beare

Parliamentary Secretary for Seniors of British Columbia
- In office July 18, 2017 – November 26, 2020
- Premier: John Horgan
- Preceded by: Linda Larson
- Succeeded by: Position abolished

Member of the British Columbia Legislative Assembly for Burnaby Centre Burnaby-Deer Lake (2017–2024)
- In office May 9, 2017 – October 24, 2026
- Preceded by: Kathy Corrigan
- Succeeded by: Joshua Domnich

Personal details
- Born: 1977 (age 48–49) Changhua County, Taiwan
- Party: BC NDP
- Other political affiliations: Burnaby Citizens Association
- Education: University of British Columbia (BM, MEd, MSc)

Anne Kang
- Traditional Chinese: 康安禮
- Simplified Chinese: 康安礼
Transcriptions
Standard Mandarin
- Hanyu Pinyin: Kāng Ānlǐ

Anne Kang (Chinese: 康安禮; born 1977) is a Taiwanese-born Canadian politician who served as a member of the Legislative Assembly of British Columbia (MLA) representing the electoral district of Burnaby-Deer Lake from 2017 to 2026. A member of the New Democratic Party, she served in the Cabinet of British Columbia from 2020 until 2026, most recently as Minister of Tourism, Arts, Culture and Sport. Prior to entering provincial politics, Kang served three terms as a city councillor on the Burnaby City Council.

== Early life and education ==
Born in Changhua County, Taiwan, Kang immigrated to Canada as a child, and has lived in Burnaby, British Columbia since 1986. She grew up in the Deer Lake neighbourhood, and graduated from Vancouver's David Thompson Secondary School with Honours in the Math & Science Program.

She completed her post-secondary education at the University of British Columbia, receiving a Bachelor of Music, a Bachelor of Education (Elementary), and Diploma in Special Education (Learning Disability). Kang has received a master's degree in Special Education (Gifted and Creative Learning) and completed two levels of Montessori Certification. She continued to further her education, obtaining certificates in Sustainable Business Strategy from Harvard University, and certificates in Change Leadership, and Financial Accounting, both from Cornell University.

Kang's personal interests are in the areas of social sustainability, youth and young adults, education, and immigration.

== Community involvement ==
Kang has volunteered and held positions with a number of not-for-profit and community organizations. These include:

- Founding Director, Global Federation of Chinese Business Women Association of British Columbia
- Director, Progressive Housing Society
- Founding Director, TIO Group of Young Professionals
- Director, Taiwanese-Canadian Association
- Founding Director, Taiwanese Heritage Association

In recognition of her community involvement, she was awarded the Queen's Diamond Jubilee Medal in 2012.

Kang has also spoken about her challenges with stuttering, and the need to end the stigmatization of those with the condition.

== Municipal politics (2008–2017) ==
Kang first ran for office in the 2008 municipal election as a candidate for the Burnaby Citizens Association, and was elected as a councillor on Burnaby City Council. She won re-election twice, serving as councillor for a total of three terms.

As a city councillor, Kang served the community of Burnaby through several sub-roles such as

- Council Liaison for the Public Library Board
- Vice Chair of the Environment Committee
- Member of the Public Safety Committee
- Council Youth Liaison.

Kang also led environmental initiatives and infrastructure projects while on Council – fostering the development of a food scrap recycling program, and planning the renovation and restructuring of the city's main library.

Effective June 27, 2017, Kang was on unpaid leave from her position as Burnaby city councillor due to her recent election to the Legislative Assembly of British Columbia. Her vacant position on Burnaby City Council was left unfilled until the 2018 municipal election.

== Provincial politics (2017–2026) ==
The incumbent MLA for Burnaby-Deer Lake Kathy Corrigan (BC NDP) announced in 2016 her decision to not seek re-election in the next provincial election. Kang was acclaimed as the NDP's candidate for the riding in May 2016, then won the seat in the 2017 provincial election. She is among the first three Taiwanese-Canadians to be elected to the Legislative Assembly of British Columbia, alongside fellow New Democrats Katrina Chen and Bowinn Ma.

She was named Parliamentary Secretary for Seniors within the Government of British Columbia in July 2017, additionally serving as Parliamentary Secretary for Multiculturalism as of July 2019. She was appointed Minister of Citizens' Services in January 2020.

Kang won re-election as MLA for Burnaby-Deer Lake in the 2020 provincial election, and was named Minister of Advanced Education, Skills and Training in November 2020. She was subsequently named Minister of Municipal Affairs in the Eby ministry on December 7, 2022. After the 2024 election, she was named Minister of Post-Secondary Education and Future Skills, her second time overseeing the ministry. Kang was defeated by Conservative candidate Joshua Domnich in the 2026 election.

== Electoral record ==
2026 British Columbia general election: Burnaby Centre
Party	Candidate	Votes	%	±%	Expenditures
Conservative	Joshua Domnich	7,465	47.25	+4.53	
New Democratic	Anne Kang	6,645	42.06	−15.22	
Green	Shila Taheri	1,288	8.15	—	
CentreBC	Vikas Gautam	402	2.54	—	
Total valid votes		15,800	99.68		
Total rejected ballots		50	0.32		
Turnout		15,850			
Registered voters					
Conservative gain from New Democratic		Swing		+9.88	
Source: Elections BC

2024 British Columbia general election: Burnaby Centre
Party	Candidate	Votes	%	±%	Expenditures
New Democratic	Anne Kang	9,780	57.28	+0.7	$54,972.27
Conservative	Dharam Kajal	7,294	42.72	–	$24,538.33
Total valid votes/expense limit		17,074	99.37	–	$71,700.08
Total rejected ballots		108	0.63	–	
Turnout		17,182	50.11	–	
Registered voters		34,290			
New Democratic notional hold		Swing		−21.0	
Source: Elections BC

2020 British Columbia general election: Burnaby-Deer Lake
Party	Candidate	Votes	%	±%	Expenditures
New Democratic	Anne Kang	9,190	56.62	+8.73	$35,031.32
Liberal	Glynnis Hoi Sum Chan	5,163	31.81	−3.73	$0.00
Green	Mehreen Chaudry	1,878	11.57	−0.52	$1,332.72
Total valid votes		16,231	100.00	–	
Total rejected ballots					
Turnout					
Registered voters					
Source: Elections BC

2017 British Columbia general election: Burnaby-Deer Lake
Party	Candidate	Votes	%	±%	Expenditures
New Democratic	Anne Kang	8,747	47.89	−0.59	$59,836.00
Liberal	Karen Xiao Bao Wang	6,491	35.54	−7.59	$69,149.01
Green	Rick McGowan	2,209	12.09	+3.70	$1,081.00
Conservative	Graham Bowers	589	3.23	–	$105.80
Independent	Elias Ishak	229	1.25	–	$3,349.14
Total valid votes		18,265	100.00	–	
Total rejected ballots		136	0.74	−0.24	
Turnout		18,401	53.00	+4.97	
Registered voters		34,716			
Source: Elections BC
