= Stan Little =

Canadian trade unionist (1911–2000)

- Little in 1972

1st National President of the Canadian Union of Public Employees
- In office 1963 – October 22, 1975
- Succeeded by: Grace Hartman

President of the National Union of Public Service Employees
- In office 1961–1963

Personal details
- Born: 1911
- Died: May 15, 2000 (age 89)

Stanley Little (1911 – May 15, 2000) was the founding National President of the Canadian Union of Public Employees from 1963 to 1975. He was also the President of the National Union of Public Service Employees from 1961 to 1963.

== Biography ==
In his early years, Little worked in a factory, a supermarket, and hydro. He first became involved in the labour movement in 1931, initially as part of Local One of the National Union of Public Service Employees (NUPSE) in Toronto, and later as part of Local Eight in York. In 1951, he was hired as a full-time union representative by the NUPSE. Little was elected as the President of the union in 1961.

With the ultimate goal of having one big union in the Canadian public sector, Little successfully negotiated a merger with the National Union of Public Employees (NUPE). This led to the founding of the Canadian Union of Public Employees (CUPE) on September 24, 1963. Little was elected National President at CUPE's first national convention alongside Robert Rintoul, the former director of the NUPE, who was elected National Secretary-Treasurer. The new union started with 78,000 members coming from 483 locals. Within five years, CUPE's membership had increased to over 115,000, and by the time Little resigned as president, it was over 210,000, making it the largest union in the country. As of 2024, CUPE has 740,000 members and assets of nearly $400 million, including a strike fund of over $130 million and a defense fund of over $34 mil. It has 74 offices across the country making Little's a giant legacy.

Trade union offices
New office	National President of the Canadian Union of Public Employees; 1963–1975	Succeeded by Grace Hartman
