= Joshua Domnich =

Canadian politician

Joshua Domnich MLA

Member of the Legislative Assembly for Burnaby Centre
- Incumbent
- Assumed office October 24, 2026
- Preceded by: Anne Kang

Personal details
- Party: Conservative

Joshua Domnich MLA is a Canadian politician who is the Member of the British Columbia Legislative Assembly for Burnaby Centre since 2026.

A graduate of Simon Fraser University, Domnich was previously the campaign manager for former MLA Reann Gasper as well as a legislative assistant to former MLA Linda Hepner.

== Electoral record ==
2026 British Columbia general election: Burnaby Centre
Party	Candidate	Votes	%	±%	Expenditures
Conservative	Joshua Domnich	6,735	47.18	+4.46	
New Democratic	Anne Kang	5,955	41.72	-15.56	
Green	Shila Taheri	1,169	8.19	-	
CentreBC	Vikas Gautam	370	2.59	-	
Total valid votes		14,229	99.68		
Total rejected ballots		46	0.32		
Turnout		14,275			
Registered voters					
Conservative gain from New Democratic		Swing		+10.01	
Source: Elections BC
