= 2021 New Brunswick public sector strike =

The 2021 New Brunswick public sector strike was labour strike in the Canadian province of New Brunswick involving employees of the provincial government, represented by the Canadian Union of Public Employees (CUPE). In October 2021, the workers voted to take strike action.

== Labour dispute ==
In December 2020, Premier of New Brunswick Blaine Higgs proposed a new four-year collective bargaining agreement that would see a wage freeze for public sectors in year one, and wage increases of 1% in each of the following three years, stating that such measures were necessary because of the impact of the COVID-19 pandemic in New Brunswick.

On 28 May, CUPE New Brunswick President Stephen Drost issued an ultimatum, calling for the government to come to an agreement with the union within 100 days, or the union would seek to launch a strike.

On 28 August, over one hundred public sectors held a demonstrate in front of the Legislative Assembly of New Brunswick, just 10 days before the expiry of the 100-day deadline.

On 3 September, negotiations between CUPE and the government broke down. The final government proposal included 1,25% raises each year for four years and then 2% in years five and six, as well as converting pensions to a shared-risk model and moving around 100 unions members into management positions. CUPE, however, was seeking pay raises of 5% each year, arguing that some its members had been without a contract for five years, and many were having trouble making ends meet and had been forced to take second jobs and rely on food banks. CUPE also stated that New Brunswick public sector workers were the lowest paid across all Canadian provinces. That week, after the end of formal negotiations, CUPE announced that it would be balloting workers for approval for a strike mandate.

In mid-September, CUPE announced that it was delaying some of the local strike votes due to several hundred workers eligible to vote having been excluded from the list given to them by the government. CUPE also accused the government of having negotiated in bad faith during the summer months.

On 6 October, CUPE announced that all 10 locals that had been in negotiations with the government, representing around 22 000 workers, had voted to strike, with an average vote of 94% of workers in favour of strike action.

== Reactions ==
Ontario senator Tony Dean called the vote to strike "a microcosm of something that’s going to be happening across the country," pointing to the fact that many unions in Canada had temporarily delayed collective bargaining negotiations throughout 2020 and 2021 to help the country focus on dealing with the COVID-19 pandemic in Canada. Dean also argued that the impact of the pandemic would see working conditions and health & safety take more prominent position in future collective bargaining agreements.
