= Workers' Communist Party (Canada) =

Workers' Communist Party Parti communiste ouvrier
- Abbreviation: WCP (English); PCO (French)
- Founded: 1975
- Dissolved: 1983
- Ideology: Communism; Marxism–Leninism; Maoism; Anti-revisionism
- Political position: Far-left

The Workers' Communist Party (French: Parti communiste ouvrier) was a Canadian Marxist–Leninist political party, founded in 1975 under the name Communist (Marxist–Leninist) League of Canada (Ligue communiste (marxiste-léniniste) du Canada). The party followed a Maoist political program and was part of the broader New Left movement. For several years it published a weekly newspaper, The Forge (La Forge). The party was strongest in Quebec, but alienated many of Quebec's young progressives because it declined to support independence for Quebec, although it did support Quebec's right to self-determination.

The most prominent former member of the Workers' Communist Party is Gilles Duceppe, former leader of the Bloc Québécois and former Leader of the Official Opposition in the House of Commons of Canada. Duceppe called his membership "a mistake" based on a search for "absolute answers" during his youth. Judy Darcy was active in the party before joining the New Democratic Party. She later became a trade union leader and a cabinet minister in British Columbia.

The Workers' Communist Party nominated 30 candidates in the 1980 Canadian federal election and 33 in the 1981 Quebec general election; the party achieved its best result in the latter, receiving 4,956 votes, or 0.14% of the provincial total.

== See also ==
- List of anti-revisionist groups
