= Paul Moist =

Canadian trade unionist

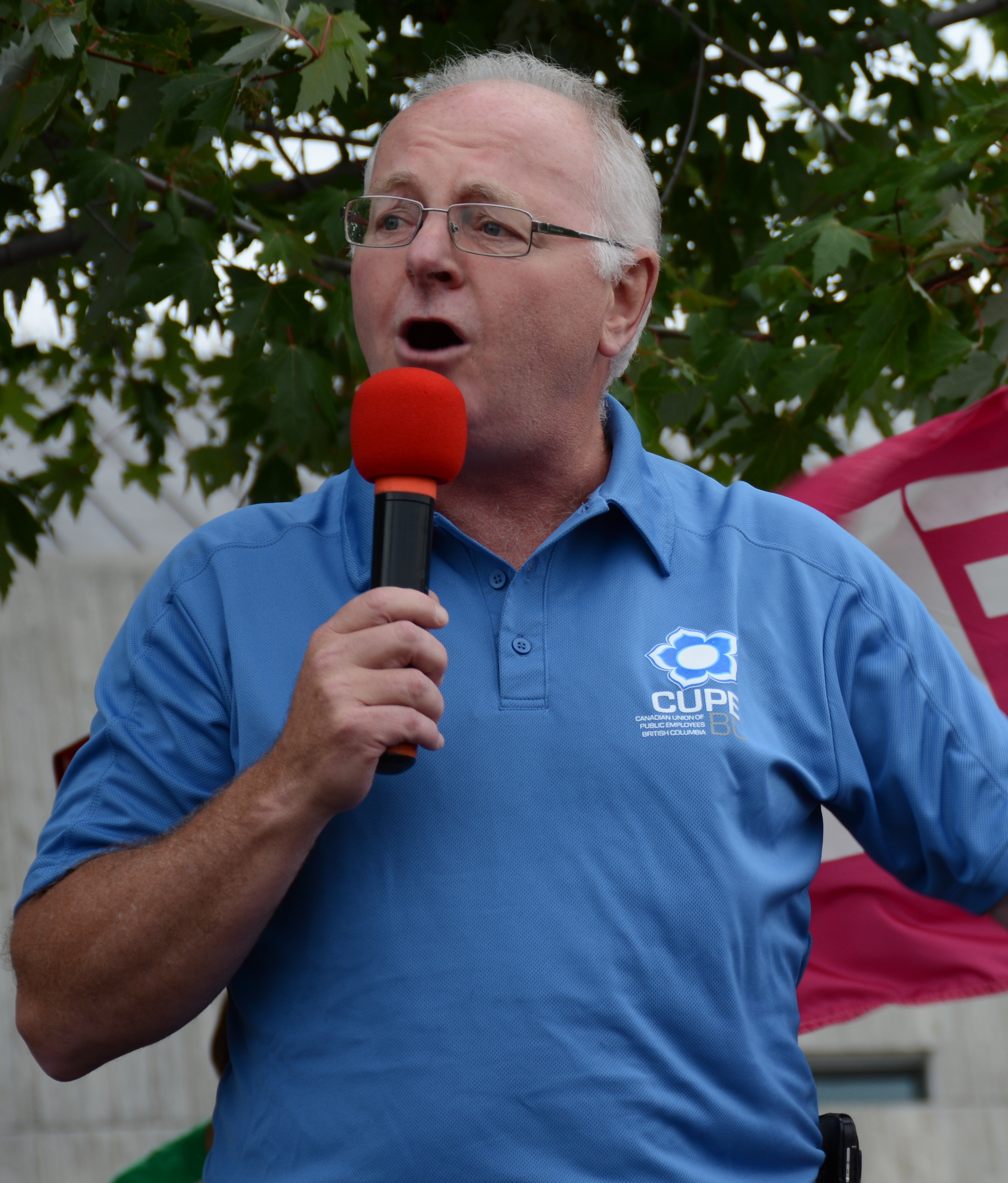
- Moist speaking at a Peoples' Social Forum rally in 2014

5th National President of the Canadian Union of Public Employees
- In office 2003–2015
- Preceded by: Judy Darcy
- Succeeded by: Mark Hancock

Personal details
- Party: New Democratic Party
- Education: University of Manitoba

Paul Moist is a former national president of the Canadian Union of Public Employees (CUPE), Canada's largest trade union, having served from 2003 to 2015.

== Career ==
Moist studied Canadian history and politics at University of Manitoba from which he received a bachelor of arts degree. He is a member and a supporter of the New Democratic Party.

Moist first joined the Canadian Union of Public Employees (CUPE) as a teenager in 1975, working first as a lifeguard, then as a greenhouse attendant for the City of Winnipeg. He was elected to his local executive after university and worked as a CUPE staff representative from 1983 to 1993.

Moist served for 10 years as the president of CUPE Local 500, representing Winnipeg municipal workers. He also served for six years as president of CUPE Manitoba.

Moist became the first western Canadian elected to lead CUPE's 600,000 members in October 2003. Under Moist's leadership, CUPE focused on branding itself as a community union, advocating for the new deal for cities, and playing roles in the defense of public health care, the fight for public, quality, child care, and in resisting attempts to privatize water and electricity services across the country.

Moist served as co-chair of Manitoba Premier Gary Doer's Economic Advisory Council and vice-chair of the Manitoba Public Insurance Corporation. He has also served as treasurer of the United Way and as a director of the Winnipeg Library Foundation and the Misericordia Health Centre. He is a vice-president of the Canadian Labour Congress.

Trade union offices
Preceded by Judy Darcy	National President of the Canadian Union of Public Employees; 2003–2015	Succeeded by Mark Hancock
