= Candace Rennick =

Canadian Labour Leader

Candace Rennick is a Canadian labour leader who currently serves as the National Secretary-Treasurer of the Canadian Union of Public Employees (CUPE), Canada's largest union. She was elected to the position in November 2021, becoming the first woman to hold the role in 20 years. Previously, she served as the Secretary-Treasurer of CUPE Ontario from late 2009 to 2021.

== Early life and career ==
Rennick was born and raised in Peterborough, Ontario. She began her career in the labour movement at age 16 when she started working at a local long-term care facility. At age 19, she became a union steward and bargaining committee member. By age 22, she was elected President of CUPE Local 2280, representing long-term care workers in the Peterborough area.

== Union leadership ==
=== CUPE Ontario ===
In late 2009, Rennick was elected Secretary-Treasurer of CUPE Ontario. She was the first woman and the youngest person ever to hold the position, serving for 12 years. During her tenure, she became a prominent advocate for long-term care reform in the province. During the 2012 New Democratic Party leadership election, Rennick endorsed Peggy Nash for the party leadership.

During the COVID-19 pandemic in Ontario, Rennick was a frequent critic of the provincial government's handling of long-term care homes, advocating for higher staffing levels and better protections for workers. In 2020, she publicly called for a "complete and total overhaul" of the system, citing that the reliance on part-time and agency workers contributed to the spread of the virus. She also highlighted that many personal support workers (PSWs) were afraid to report to work due to lack of PPE and fear of infecting their own families.

=== CUPE National ===
Rennick was elected National Secretary-Treasurer of CUPE National on November 24, 2021, succeeding Charles Fleury. She was elected alongside National President Mark Hancock. In this role, she oversees the finances and administration of the union, which represents nearly 800,000 workers across Canada.

As National Secretary-Treasurer, she has been involved in high-profile labour disputes, including negotiations with Air Canada and the unionization drive for Porter Airlines cabin crew. In August 2025, she acted as a spokesperson regarding unpaid work hours for flight attendants during contract talks.
