= Bill 124 =

Law in Ontario, Canada

Protecting a Sustainable Public Sector for Future Generations Act, 2019
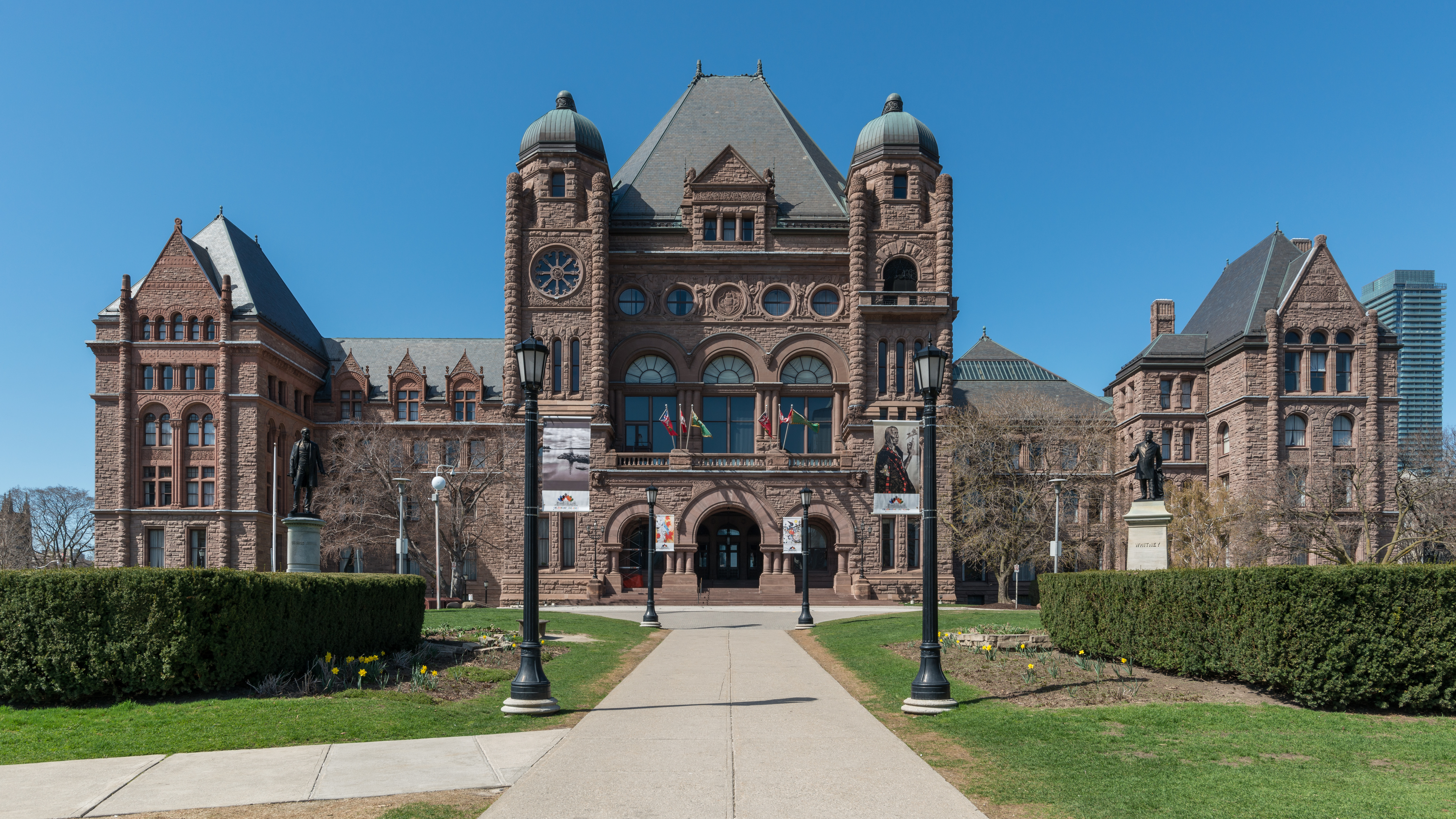

Legislative Assembly of Ontario
- Long title: An Act to implement moderation measures in respect of compensation in Ontario's public sector (Bill 124, 2019)
- Territorial extent: Ontario
- Enacted by: Legislative Assembly of Ontario
- Royal assent: 7 November 2019

Legislative history
- First reading: 5 June 2019
- Second reading: 31 October 2019
- Third reading: 7 November 2019
- Status: Repealed

The Protecting a Sustainable Public Sector for Future Generations Act, more commonly known as Bill 124 (French: Loi visant à préserver la viabilité du secteur public pour les générations futures) was a law in the province of Ontario limiting public sector salary increases to one percent for each of the next three years. After a legal challenge from unions, it was struck down as unconstitutional in November 2022 by the Ontario Superior Court of Justice, a decision upheld by the Court of Appeal for Ontario in February 2024. Afterwards Premier Doug Ford, whose Progressive Conservative government passed the bill, said that the law would be repealed.

== Summary ==
The government of Ontario spent a budget of around CA$163.4 billion in the year 2019, with around CA$72 billion of that being used for salaries and worker compensation. The province employed over one million civil servants that year.

The bill imposed a 1% limit on pay increases from 2020 to 2023 for public sector workers and for agencies and commissions that received over $1 million in provincial funding. The bill, however, contained a number of exemptions for certain classes of workers, such as local police.

The bill was introduced before the Legislative Assembly of Ontario in early June 2019, with the president of the Ontario Treasury Board and MPP Peter Bethlenfalvy stating that the bill would "ensure that increases in public sector compensation reflect the fiscal situation of the province." The Progressive Conservative government had already frozen the salaries of public sector executives who earned more than $100 000 as part of their plans to address the province's budget deficit. It received royal assent in November 2019.

== Criticism and legal challenge ==
The bill attracted a high degree of opposition from workers' unions. Several teachers' unions in the province vowing to fight it in court. The bill was also criticised for the impact it would on teaching assistants in universities, who already faced issues with low pay and heavy workloads.

The bill attracted particular opposition from nurses, who had not been exempted from the salary increase despite being healthcare workers. Some other public sector workers, such as police officers and firefighters, had been declared exempt on the grounds that they were essential workers. The exclusion of nurses from the exemption was described by some commentators as potentially contributing to gender inequity in Ontario, as the proportion of women is nursing is much higher than in other emergency professions. Criticism of the exclusion was increased as the COVID-19 pandemic in Ontario hit, especially as the government of Ontario described nurses as "heroic frontline workers."

In December 2019, a coalition of ten unions announced their intention to launch a court challenge over the bill, claiming that it limited their ability to collective bargaining and striking that would be protected under the Canadian Charter of Rights and Freedoms. The lawsuit was launched in September 2021.

In November 2022, the Ontario Superior Court of Justice struck down the bill on November 29, 2022, saying that "the law infringes on the applicants' rights to freedom of association and collective bargaining." On February 12, 2024, the Court of Appeal for Ontario upheld the lower court ruling. Subsequently, the Ford government announced that it would not appeal the case to the Supreme Court of Canada, would repeal the law, and introduce regulations in the meantime so non-unionized government workers could benefit as well.
