= Hospital Employees' Union =

Health care trade union in British Columbia, Canada

- Abbreviation: HEU
- Formation: 1944
- Type: Trade union
- Headquarters: Burnaby, British Columbia, Canada
- Location: British Columbia, Canada
- Members: 60,000
- President: Barb Nederpel
- Secretary–business manager: Lynn Bueckert
- Parent organization: Canadian Union of Public Employees
- Website: heu.org

The Hospital Employees' Union (HEU), founded in 1944 at Vancouver General Hospital, is now the oldest and largest trade union for hospital workers and health care specialists in British Columbia. The HEU represents 60,000 members across the public, non-profit, and private health sectors. It is also a member in the British Columbia Federation of Labour and the Canadian Union of Public Employees (CUPE).

In 2004, the HEU was judged to have conducted an illegal strike in BC hospitals. Members were painted as working fewer hours for higher rates than the national average, and were told their vacation benefits were generous (five weeks after 10 years of employment and up to nine weeks after 25 years), there was dispute with the provincial government for privatization of in-house support services in BC health authorities. The Hospital Employees' Union eventually won a related Supreme Court of Canada case in 2007. The court's decision established that union bargaining is a constitutional right. The court win led to a negotiated settlement with the provincial government which paid up to $85 million to former HEU members who lost their jobs.

Judy Darcy, elected as provincial Member of the Legislative Assembly for New Westminster in 2013, had been HEU's business manager from 2005 to 2011. Darcy was appointed Opposition Health Critic by the British Columbia New Democratic Party.

In 2015, the HEU advocated against proposed privatization of laundry services by Interior Health Authority.

HEU also applied in 2015 to be an intervenor in a Supreme Court of Canada case involving the British Columbia Teachers' Federation.
