= Charles Fleury (trade unionist) =

Canadian trade union activist

National Secretary-Treasurer of the Canadian Union of Public Employees
- In office November 2, 2011 – 2021
- Preceded by: Claude Généreux

Personal details
- Party: New Democratic Party

Charles Fleury is a Canadian trade union activist and former National Secretary-Treasurer of the Canadian Union of Public Employees (CUPE). Fleury was elected National Secretary-Treasurer on November 2, 2011 at the CUPE National Convention in Vancouver, British Columbia. He retired in 2021 and was succeeded by Candace Rennick.

== Career ==
Fleury started his activism as a trade unionist in 1982, when he started working for Hydro-Québec, working as a millwright and high-tension tower lineman under CUPE local 1500. By 1999, he was elected to the position of secretary general of local 1500 Fleury was first elected to the CUPE National Executive board as a regional vice-president for the Québec division On November 2, 2011, Fleury was elected to his first term as CUPE National Secretary-Treasurer. He was re-elected as National Secretary-Treasurer again in 2013 and 2015.

Fleury is an advocate for climate change having attended global summits including the 2009 United Nations Climate Change Conference in Copenhagen and the 2015 United Nations Climate Change Conference in Paris.

Fleury is a supporter of the New Democratic Party of Canada and works with NDP officials and candidates.
