= Keeping Students in Class Act =

Ontario law relating to public-school labour disputes

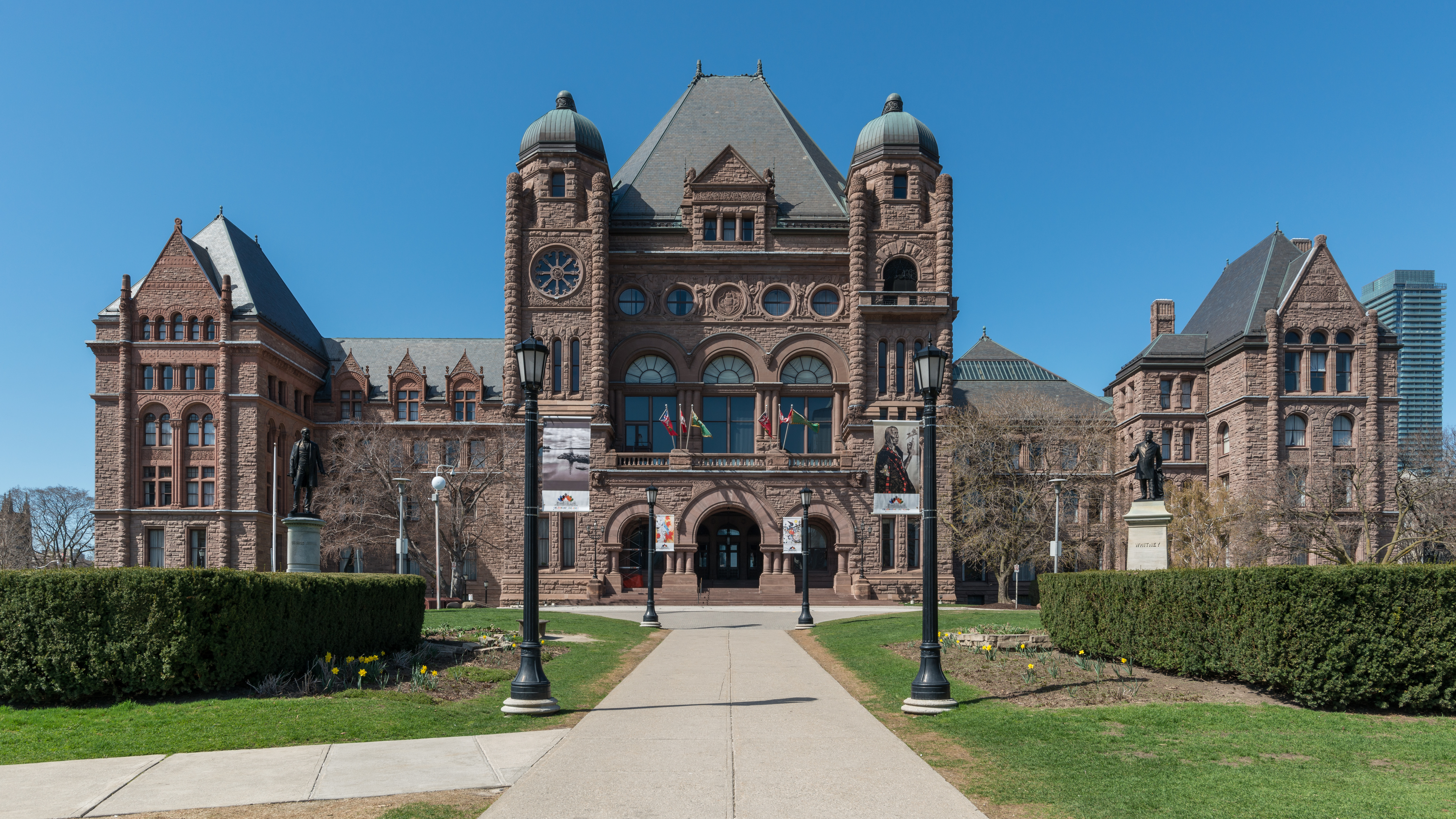

Legislative Assembly of Ontario
- Long title: An Act to resolve labour disputes involving school board employees represented by the Canadian Union of Public Employees
- Royal assent: 3 November 2022
- Repealed: 14 November 2022

Legislative history
- Bill citation: Bill 28
- Introduced by: Stephen Lecce MPP, Minister of Education
- First reading: 31 October 2022
- Second reading: 1 November 2022
- Third reading: 3 November 2022

Repealed by
- Keeping Students in Class Repeal Act, Bill 35, 2022
- Status: Void ab initio

The Keeping Students in Class Act, 2022 (French: Loi de 2022 visant à garder les élèves en classe, Bill 28, 2022) was a law in the province of Ontario. It aimed to address labour disputes between the Canadian Union of Public Employees (CUPE) and the province of Ontario regarding employees in Ontario public school districts. The act prohibited any strikes by CUPE members by declaring strikes by the union to be illegal under Ontario's Labour Relations Act, setting a fine of up to $4,000 per day on strike for members, and $500,000 per day on strike for the union. The bill used the controversial notwithstanding clause of the Canadian Charter of Rights and Freedoms to override Canadians' constitutional right to strike. After the union's decision to strike anyway, protests, other unions pledging to join in, and proposals for a general strike, CUPE and the Ontario government came to an agreement to repeal the bill, and declare it and any collective agreements enacted by it to "never have come into operation".

== Summary ==
The bill declared that any strike action by members of the Canadian Union of Public Employees (CUPE) to be illegal and punishable with fines of up to $4,000 per day on strike for members, and $500,000 per day on strike for the union. It also contained a modal collective bargaining agreement that the union members and school board were forced to adhere to. The law states that it will operate notwithstanding sections 2, 7 and 15 of the Canadian Charter of Rights and Freedoms and that it will apply despite the Human Rights Code, meaning it cannot be challenged in court despite clearly violating the right to strike, which is afforded to all persons in Canada as set out in the Canadian Charter of Rights and Freedoms, according to the Supreme Court case Saskatchewan Federation of Labour v Saskatchewan.

== Background ==
CUPE represents around 55,000 workers in Ontario public and Catholic school boards including educational assistants, custodians, school secretaries, designated early childhood educators, IT workers, maintenance workers, and library staff. On 31 August 2022, the educational workers' collective bargaining agreement expired and they started negotiations with the province for a new one.

On 26 September 2022, the union announced that their members voted 96.5% in favour of a strike.

The primary point of contention between the province and the union was employee compensation. The province offered raises of 2% per year for workers making less than $40,000 and 1.25% for all other workers, while CUPE was looking for the much higher rate of 11.7%, pointing out that the province's offer is only an extra $800 year for the average worker. The province's final offer was an increase of 2.5% for workers making under $43,000, and a 1.5% for all other workers, which the union rejected as too little, citing 3 years of wage freezes brought on by Bill 124. Finally on 30 October, CUPE issued an official 5-day strike notice.

The next day on 31 October, Ontario's Progressive Conservative government introduced the Keeping Students in Class Act to preempt a strike by the union. The bill passed on 3 November along party lines with the Progressive Conservatives voting in favour and the Liberal and New Democratic parties voting against.

== Reception ==
The bill faced a strong backlash from CUPE, many other unions, and human rights organisations, especially regarding the use of the notwithstanding clause to override charther rights of the workers impacted. The union announced that they would strike regardless, and that they would challenge the fines and pay them on behalf of the workers if needed to ensure that the workers would not be paying out of pocket.

Prime Minister Justin Trudeau called the use of the Notwithstanding Clause to impose a contract on education workers "wrong". He told reporters "I know that collective bargaining negotiations are sometimes difficult, but it has to happen. The suspension of people’s rights is something that you should only do in the most exceptional circumstances, and I really hope that all politicians call out the overuse of the notwithstanding clause to suspend people’s rights and freedoms."

Federal Justice Minister David Lametti told reporters that the federal government has the option to challenge the legislation but had not decided on what to do yet. He said "The use of the notwithstanding clause is very serious. It de facto means that people’s rights are being infringed and it’s being justified. Using the notwithstanding clause and using it preemptively is exceedingly problematic. It cuts off both political debate and judicial scrutiny, and both of those are problematic in our democracy. Both are essential parts of our democracy."

== Repeal and aftermath ==
The morning of Monday 8 November 2022, Premier Doug Ford held a press conference where he said he would repeal the legislation as "a sign of good faith". In return, the union agreed to temporarily stop their strike and continue bargaining.

On 14 November 2022, the Ford government introduced Bill 35, "Keeping Students in Class Repeal Act". The bill passed the same day with all MPP's voting in favour. The new bill repealed Bill 28 ab initio by declaring:

1. The Keeping Students in Class Act, 2022 is repealed and is deemed for all purposes never to have been in force.

2. For greater certainty, the collective agreements that were deemed to be in operation under subsection 5 (1) of the Keeping Students in Class Act, 2022 are deemed for all purposes never to have come into operation.

After further negotiations, on 20 November 2022, the CUPE bargaining committee reached a collective agreement they were happy with. A vote was held by the workers to ratify this new collective agreement beginning on 24 November 2022. On 4 December when the voting period ended, 73% of the workers had voted to ratify the agreement.

The new agreement included a flat $1 per hour raise for all workers, which is about a 3.59% raise annually for the average worker. It did not, however, include any staffing level guarantees as the union had hoped for. The President of the Ontario School Board Council of Unions Laura Walton who was leading the bargaining said that she was not happy with that aspect of the agreement.
