= Return to work order =

Legal order ending a strike

A return to work order (also known as a back to work order) is a legal order issued by a government or other public authority that orders an end to a strike by workers, forcing employees to return to their jobs. Such actions may take different legal forms, depending on the jurisdiction. These measures are typically used during labor disputes in industries considered essential to national infrastructure, security, or economics. Examples of such industries include rail systems, ports, postal systems, manufacturing, or aviation.

== Legal mechanisms ==
=== Judicial injunctions ===
Throughout various countries (including the United States), judicial injunctions are a major method used to end private-sector strikes. This usually involves the federal government petitioning a court. Once issued, the injunction mandates that employees return to work for a certain "cooling off" period while negotiations or mediation occurs. This period generally varies from country-to-country.

=== Executive actions ===
In certain jurisdictions and industries, a government executive can bypass the judicial or legislative branches entirely and directly issue orders to terminate a strike.

=== Binding arbitration ===
Some countries accompany a return to work order with binding arbitration. Instead of allowing both sides to negotiate, the dispute is handed off to a third-party arbitrator. The arbitrator then presents the final compromise contract which both parties are legally required to accept.

== Examples by country ==
=== Canada ===
Under Section 107 of the Canada Labour Code, federal labor ministers have authority to direct the Canada Industrial Relations Board to end a strike.

=== Italy ===
In Italy the Prime Minister, or a nominated minister, may limit a strike when a labor stoppage would involve services that are considered essential.

=== South Korea ===
In South Korea, Article 59 of the Medical Service Act gives the Ministry of Health and Welfare the power to order a resumption to medical service providers and institutions when public health is threatened.

Similarly, Article 14 of the Trucking Transport Business Act provides the Ministry of Land, Infrastructure and Transport with permission to order transport service providers and their employees to return to work and resume normal business operations in case of economic risk. Notably, this provision was first invoked during a cement trucker strike in 2022.

=== Thailand ===
Under Chapter 3 of Thailand's Labour Relations Act, the Ministry of Labour has the power to order striking workers back to work, when the strike may negatively impact the economy, cause public hardship, endanger national security, or disrupt public order. Strikes can also be ended in times of martial law or during a state of emergency.

=== United States ===
The Taft–Hartley Act gives the president authority to seek an injunction against labor stoppages that affect "national health and safety" in private sectors through a federal district court. If granted, the injunction prevents employees from striking for 80 days.

The president has greater powers over transportation sectors through the Railway Labor Act. The RLA allows the president to prohibit strikes for 30 days, if the strike would threaten essential transportation needs.

== Notable instances ==
- The steel strike of 1959 by United Steelworkers of America lasted for 116 days, during which 85 percent of US steel mills were shut down. President Dwight D. Eisenhower invoked the Taft-Hartley Act to end the strike, and this action was upheld by the Supreme Court in United Steelworkers v. United States.
- On August 3, 1981, US president Ronald Reagan ordered an end to the PATCO strike, directing all air traffic controllers to return to work within 48 hours. The strike was ended with over 11 thousand strikers fired.
- In February 2024, the South Korean government issued the first in a series of a return to work orders demanding an end to a medical professional strike, part of the 2024–2026 South Korean medical crisis.
- In December 2024, a return to work order was issued to Canada Post employees, forcing an end to a month long strike.
