= Grace Hartman (trade unionist) =

Canadian trade unionist (1918–1993)

2nd National President of the Canadian Union of Public Employees
- In office 1975–1983
- Preceded by: Stan Little
- Succeeded by: Jeff Rose

2nd National Secretary-Treasurer of the Canadian Union of Public Employees
- In office 1967–1975
- President: Stan Little
- Preceded by: Robert P. Rintoul
- Succeeded by: Kealey Cummings

Personal details
- Born: Grace Fulcher; July 14, 1918 Toronto, Ontario
- Died: December 18, 1993 (aged 75) Toronto, Ontario
- Occupation: Secretary, trade unionist, social activist

Grace Hartman (née Fulcher; July 14, 1918 – December 18, 1993) was a Canadian labour union activist, whose 1975 election to the presidency of the Canadian Union of Public Employees made her the first woman in North America to lead a major labour union. She held that post until 1983.

== Union activism ==
Prior to 1963, Hartman was a member of one of CUPE's predecessor unions, the National Union of Public Employees. As a secretary for the Township of North York, Ontario, she was a member of NUPE Local 373. Hartman held several local executive positions and was elected president of the local in 1959, a position she held until 1967.

== Feminist activism ==
Hartman was a prominent participant in the feminist movement, and a strong advocate for gender pay equity. In 1965, she chaired the Ontario Federation of Labour's Women's Committee. She joined the steering committee of the Committee for the Equality of Women in Canada in 1966, which successfully lobbied the Canadian government to establish the Royal Commission on the Status of Women in Canada. In 1968, Hartman was appointed to the Advisory Council of the Royal Commission on the Status of Women. In 1974–75, she became the second national president of the National Action Committee on the Status of Women.

== Honours and positions ==
Hartman was awarded the Governor General's Award in Commemoration of the Persons Case in 1985.

Hartman was also awarded honorary Doctor of Laws degrees from York University and Queen's University.
