= Marlborough, Burnaby =

Neighourhood in Burnaby, British Columbia

Marlborough
- Neighbourhood
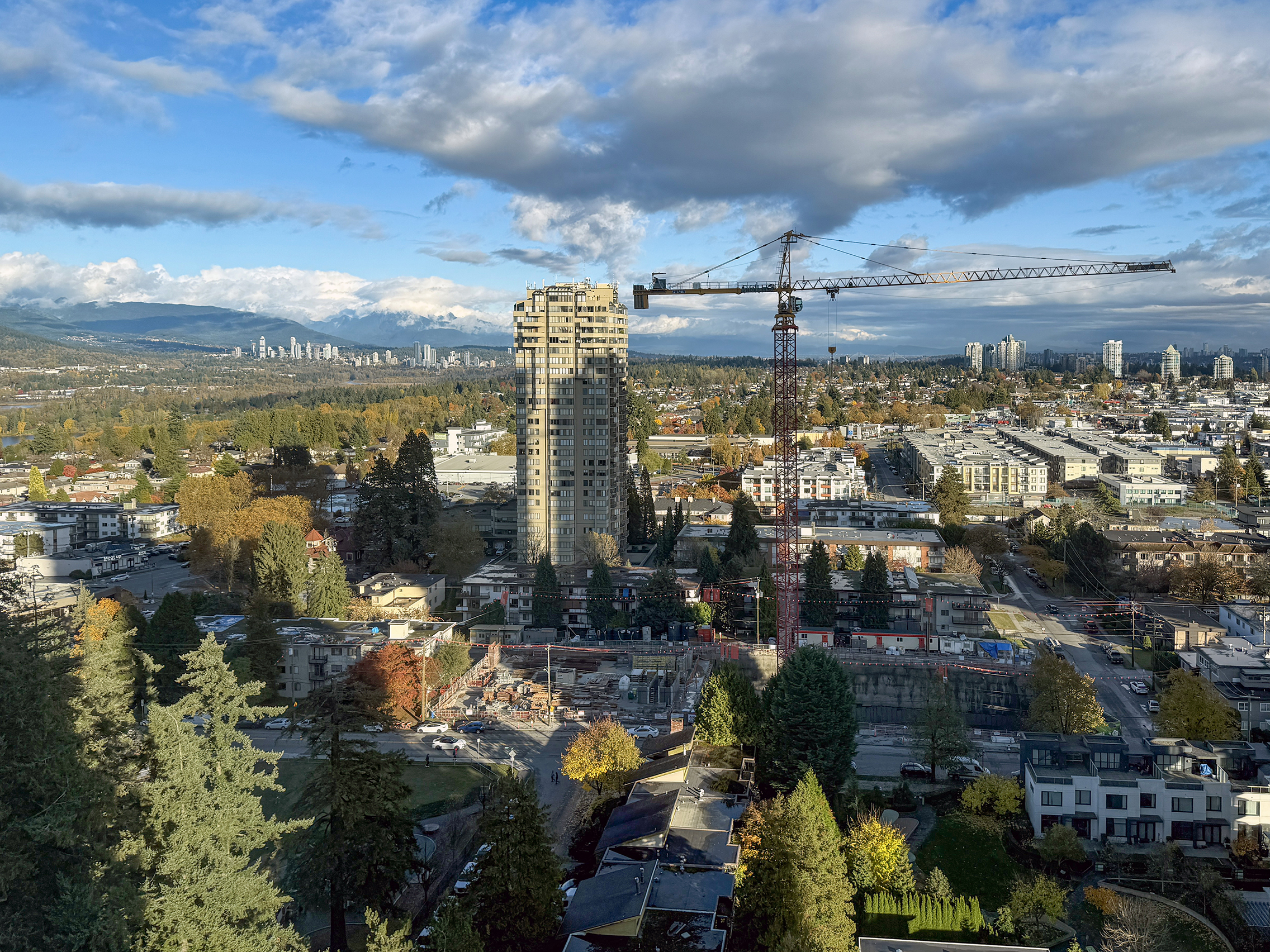
- Nelson towers in Marlborough

- Location in Metro Vancouver
- Coordinates: 49.2278174°N 122.9917036°W
- Country: Canada
- Province: British Columbia
- City: Burnaby

Marlborough is a neighbourhood in Burnaby, British Columbia, Canada, located on the southern part of Burnaby. The neighbourhood is bounded by Dover Street, Royal Oak Avenue to the east, Kingsway to the south and Nelson Avenue to the west. It is from walking to Metropolis at Metrotown, making it an attractive area.

== Description ==
The neighbourhood has mainly businesses on the southern part on Kingsway such as an IHOP and a 7-Eleven. Marlborough Ave runs from Kingsway and terminates at Marlborough Elementary School. The neighborhoods main housing consists, of Nelson Towers, and Horizon Towers.

== Services ==
There is a Fire Station on Marlborough Avenue south of Kingsway.

The 110, and 144 run parallel on Nelson Avenue and provide service from Lougheed Station, and SFU to Metrotown respectively. The 119 and N19 Nightbus run on Kingsway. The 119 goes from Edmonds to Metrotown, while the N19 goes from Downtown to Surrey Central Station during late hours.

== History ==
In 1939 King George VI, and Queen Elizabeth drove along Marlborough Ave. Recently Newton Street, and Marlborough Avenue, have been repaved, and have had sidewalks repaired.
