= Canadian Union of Public Employees =

Canadian trade union

- Syndicat canadien de la fonction publique
- Abbreviation: CUPE (SCFP)
- Formation: 1963; 63 years ago
- Merger of: National Union of Public Employees; National Union of Public Service Employees
- Type: Trade union
- Headquarters: Ottawa, Ontario, Canada
- Location: Canada
- Members: 800,000 (2025)
- Official languages: English; French
- President: Mark Hancock
- Secretary-treasurer: Candace Rennick
- Affiliations: Canadian Labour Congress; International Transport Workers' Federation; Public Services International
- Website: cupe.ca

The Canadian Union of Public Employees (CUPE; French: Syndicat canadien de la fonction publique [SCFP]) is a Canadian trade union representing workers in the public sector and, increasingly, in the non-profit and para-public sectors. It is the largest union in Canada. As of 2025, it represented 800,000 workers in health care, education, municipalities, libraries, universities, social services, public utilities, transportation, emergency services, and airlines. More than 60% of CUPE's members are women and almost a third are part-time workers. CUPE is affiliated with the Canadian Labour Congress.

== History ==
=== 1952–1963 (formation) ===
Efforts to create a national union for municipal workers began with Patrick (Pat) Lenihan in the 1930s. Lenihan immigrated to North America from Ireland and, after some time as a member of the Industrial Workers of the World, became president of Trades and Labour Congress (TLC) Local 37, representing the City of Calgary's outside workers (today CUPE Local 37).

At the 1952 TLC convention, Lenihan proposed a national union to represent civic employees, along the lines of industrial unionism. There was no such union at the time; individual locals received charters directly from the central labour organization. Over the following year, Lenihan organized 22,000 civic and hospital workers into the Canadian Federation of Civic Employees. In 1955, the union changed its name to the National Union of Public Employees (NUPE) and elected Garnet Shire, president of Local 79 in Toronto (today CUPE Local 79), as its president.

In 1956, the TLC merged with the Canadian Congress of Labour (CCL) to form the Canadian Labour Congress (CLC).

The National Union of Public Service Employees (NUPSE), founded in 1952 under the CCL, competed with NUPE; it had fewer members. In 1956, Lenihan, by then NUPE's president, and some NUPSE officials proposed that the CLC form a single union for Canadian public sector workers. The CLC agreed and a merger committee was struck.

The merger was completed at a joint convention in 1963 that founded the Canadian Union of Public Employees. The new union had 78,317 members in 483 locals, making it the second-largest union in the CLC and its largest Canadian affiliate. Stan Little, previously national director of NUPSE, became CUPE's first president.

=== 1963–1975 (Little) ===
In its first year, CUPE chartered 30 new locals, increasing its membership by 8%. Between 1963 and 2004, CUPE was involved in 1,502 strikes, 6.5% of the 23,115 work stoppages in Canada in that period.

In 1966, CUPE won the right to represent 9,000 office, trades and technical employees at Hydro-Québec, defeating the Confederation of National Trade Unions for certification. In 1967 the local held a six-week strike over wages, working conditions and province-wide parity for office and technical employees, using rotating strikes across Quebec.

In 1967, employees of the CBC affiliated with CUPE. At its third national convention, the same year, CUPE established a National Defence Fund to provide strike pay.

In 1968, in a brief to the Royal Commission on the Status of Women, CUPE proposed "amending and expanding various aspects of federal law to improve conditions and remuneration for working women", including broader equal-pay requirements and improved day care and maternity leave.

In 1969, CUPE had almost 130,000 members, about a third of them women. By Little's retirement in 1975, it had 210,000 members and had overtaken the United Steelworkers as the largest affiliate of the Canadian Labour Congress.

=== 1975–1983 (Hartman) ===
Little was succeeded by Grace Hartman, a feminist activist, described as the first woman to lead a major labour union in North America. Hartman associated CUPE with social unionism rather than business unionism.

On October 14, 1976, more than 100,000 CUPE members joined about one million other Canadians in a one-day general strike against the federal Anti-Inflation Board and its wage and price controls. CUPE calculated that the controls had cost its members $23 million in income over 15 months.

In 1978, CUPE closed its national accounts with CIBC after it and three other major Canadian banks continued lending to apartheid South Africa.

In 1980, CUPE set up a national task force on nursing homes, examining safety regulations and the absence of any requirement for private owners to disclose costs, income and profits.

In 1981, CUPE members at 51 of 66 Ontario hospitals held an eight-day strike. Ontario had replaced hospital workers' right to strike with binding arbitration in 1965; when their contract expired in 1980, 91% of members rejected the Ontario Hospital Association's offer, and the association announced it would seek arbitration. The strikers sought wage increases, better staffing levels and better quality of care. Twenty-two members were charged with contempt of court for defying a back-to-work order from the Supreme Court of Ontario; Hartman, Lucie Nicholson and Ray Arsenault were later sentenced for contempt, Hartman to 45 days in jail.

When Hartman retired in 1983, CUPE had 294,633 members.

=== 1983–1991 (Rose) ===
Hartman was succeeded by Jeff Rose, former president of Local 79 in Toronto, the first Jewish Canadian elected national president. During his tenure, membership grew from 294,000 to 407,000, and the union opposed Brian Mulroney-era wage restraint, free trade, the GST, privatization, deregulation and cuts to public services. Rose stepped down in 1991 to become deputy minister of intergovernmental affairs in Ontario's NDP government.

=== 1991–2003 (Darcy) ===
Judy Darcy succeeded Rose in 1991, becoming the second woman and second Jewish Canadian to lead the union. She opposed privatization, two-tier health care and free trade agreements; under her presidency CUPE opposed the invasion of Iraq and Canadian participation in ballistic missile defence, and supported same-sex marriage. Darcy stepped down in 2003 and was succeeded by Paul Moist.

=== 2003–2015 (Moist) ===
Paul Moist was national president from 2003 to 2015. In January 2009, he publicly opposed a CUPE Ontario proposal to bar Israeli academics from Ontario campuses (see below). He retired in 2015.

=== 2015–present (Hancock) ===
In November 2015, Mark Hancock, president of CUPE British Columbia, defeated CUPE Ontario president Fred Hahn to become national president.

On November 4, 2022, about 55,000 CUPE education workers in Ontario struck after the provincial government legislated a contract and invoked the notwithstanding clause to prohibit a strike. Prime Minister Justin Trudeau said that using the clause "to suspend workers' rights is wrong". The government undertook to repeal the legislation, and CUPE ended the walkout.

In August 2025, CUPE's Air Canada flight attendants held a three-day strike that ended on August 19 with a tentative agreement reached with the help of a federal mediator. In September 2025, 99.1% of members voting rejected its wage terms, which were referred to mediation and, failing agreement, arbitration.

Hancock and national secretary-treasurer Candace Rennick were re-elected in October 2025.

== Internal organization ==
CUPE has a highly decentralized structure: each local elects its own executive, sets its own dues, conducts its own bargaining and strike votes, and sends delegates to division and national conventions that set overall policy. Supporters say this places power with the rank and file; critics say it makes concerted action difficult and leaves policies and strategies varying widely between locals and sectors. The national headquarters in Ottawa is relatively small; most staff work in more than 70 offices across the country.

CUPE locals are affiliated directly to the national union; affiliation to provincial CUPE bodies is optional. The national union supports locals through National Representatives, staff assigned to assist elected local officers with grievance arbitration, bargaining, disability and accommodation issues, human rights, legal documents, local elections and education. Under the CUPE Constitution, a National Representative may place a local under administration, suspending its elected officers, usually in cases of fraud, gross incompetence or misconduct. CUPE also employs research and legal and legislative representatives who support locals through their servicing representatives.

Nationally, there are two full-time elected positions: the national president (currently Mark Hancock) and the national secretary-treasurer (currently Candace Rennick).

== Provincial divisions ==
CUPE's provincial divisions, chartered by the national union, advocate at the provincial level for legislative and policy change. Each is led by an elected president, secretary-treasurer and executive board, directed by annual conventions (biennial in Quebec). Divisions do not service locals on operational matters; they focus on provincial lobbying, policy development and union education.

== Internal labour relations ==
CUPE's employees are organized in two main bargaining units. The larger, the Canadian Staff Union (CSU), represents National Representatives and specialist staff in area and regional offices across CUPE's 10 regions; in 2008 it absorbed the Administrative and Technical Staff Union, which represented about 60 administrative and technical staff at the Ottawa national office. Canadian Office and Professional Employees Union (COPE) Local 491 represents support staff in the national, regional and area offices. A few CUPE locals have dedicated staff working in their own offices.

== National presidents ==
- 1963–1975: Stan Little
- 1975–1983: Grace Hartman
- 1983–1991: Jeff Rose
- 1991–2003: Judy Darcy
- 2003–2015: Paul Moist
- 2015–present: Mark Hancock

== National secretary-treasurers ==
- 1963–1967: Robert P. Rintoul
- 1967–1975: Grace Hartman
- 1975–1985: Kealey Cummings
- 1985–1989: Jean-Claude Laniel
- 1989–1991: Judy Darcy
- 1991–2001: Geraldine McGuire
- 2001–2011: Claude Généreux
- 2011–2021: Charles Fleury
- 2021–present: Candace Rennick

== Controversies ==
=== Israel boycott campaigns and social media posts ===
Positions taken by CUPE bodies on the Israeli–Palestinian conflict, chiefly by CUPE Ontario and some university locals, have drawn controversy. CUPE Ontario states that its actions are in line with its values and side against injustice, but pro-Israel groups, including the Centre for Israel and Jewish Affairs (CIJA), interpreted their positions as condoning violence.

==== 2006 boycott resolution ====
In May 2006, the CUPE Ontario convention unanimously adopted Resolution 50, committing the division to the international campaign of boycott, divestment and sanctions against Israel. The resolution criticizes Israel's occupation of Palestinian territory and describes it as apartheid. Many Israel supporters spoke out against the resolution.

==== 2009 academic boycott proposal ====
In January 2009, during the Gaza War, CUPE Ontario president Sid Ryan announced a proposal to bar Israeli academics from speaking, teaching or doing research at Ontario universities unless they explicitly condemned Israel's attack on the Islamic University of Gaza. Pro-Israel groups spoke out against the proposal and called Ryan's phrasing antisemitic. A revised resolution was adopted in February 2009 that targeted links with Israeli universities rather than individual academics.

==== After the October 7 attacks ====
After the October 7th attack in 2023, CUPE Local 3906 at McMaster University posted "Palestine is rising, long live the resistance". The post was deleted, and the local's executive said it rejected the conflation of support for Palestine with condoning violence against civilians. CUPE Ontario president Fred Hahn posted messages praising "the power of resistance". Israel supporters disliked the statements: Ontario premier Doug Ford denounced them, and the CIJA called on CUPE to replace Hahn. On October 21, Hahn apologized, saying the post "was an error" and that his social media had "become a giant lightning rod for both legitimate anger, and also for bad faith actors with a divisive agenda". CUPE's national statement was that the union was "horrified by the Hamas attack on Israel" and called for a ceasefire.

==== 2024 video and call for Hahn's resignation ====
On August 11, 2024, Hahn shared a Facebook video in which an Israeli Olympic diver with a Star of David tattoo turned into a bomb. He deleted it on August 18, saying it had "caused pain" and that he had not intended to associate Jewish people with the violence of the Israeli state. CUPE's national executive board said it had "lost confidence" in Hahn and asked him to resign as general vice-president for Ontario. CUPE's national officers said the video was "a clear violation of our union's equality statement", that the request had preceded the provincial government's criticism, and that it did not change the union's call for a ceasefire in Gaza. Hahn announced in February 2026 that he would not seek re-election at its May 2026 convention.

== Archives ==
There is a Canadian Union of Public Employees fonds at Library and Archives Canada. The archival reference number is R5440, former archival reference number MG28-I234. The fonds covers the period 1919 to 2009 and contains 105.46 metres of textual records, along with records in other media.
