= Burnaby-Willingdon =

Defunct provincial electoral district in British Columbia, Canada

Burnaby-Willingdon was a provincial electoral district for the Legislative Assembly of British Columbia, Canada, from 1966 to 2009.

== Demographics ==
Population, 2001	53,380
Population Change, 1996–2001	10.2%
Area (km^{2})	15
Pop. Density (People per km^{2})	3,556

== Election results ==
B.C. General Election 1991: Burnaby-Willingdon
Party	Candidate	Votes	%	±	Expenditures
New Democratic	Joan Sawicki	10,597	44.36%		$60,994
Liberal	Susan French	8,023	33.59%		$6,337
Social Credit	Elwood Veitch	5,036	21.08%	–	$78,923
Green	Ken Lay	232	0.97%	–	$702
Total valid votes		23,888	100.00%		
Total rejected ballots		494	2.03%		
Turnout		24,382	74.04%		

B.C. General Election 1996: Burnaby-Willingdon
Party	Candidate	Votes	%	±	Expenditures
New Democratic	Joan Sawicki	10,501	45.54%		$35,882
Liberal	John Nuraney	9,678	41.97%		$46,603
Progressive Democrat	Thomas Reekie	1,161	5.03%	–	$210
Reform	Sunny G. Sodhi	999	4.33%		$28,321
Green	Joe Keithley	458	1.99%	–	$160
Conservative	Peter B. MacDonald	190	0.82%		$100
Natural Law	Henriette Toth	74	0.32%		$134
Total valid votes		23,061	100.00%		
Total rejected ballots		183	0.79%		
Turnout		23,244	71.73%		

2001 British Columbia general election
Party	Candidate	Votes	%	Expenditures
Liberal	John Nuraney	10,207	55.79	$46,187
New Democratic	Dave Myles	4,608	25.19	$18,928
Green	Joe Keithley	2,879	15.74	$2,419
Marijuana	Pamela Zak	362	1.98	$394
Council of British Columbians	Dennis MacAuley	240	1.30	$190
Total valid votes		18,296	100.00	
Total rejected ballots		158	0.86	
Turnout		18,454	70.07	

2005 British Columbia general election
Party	Candidate	Votes	%	Expenditures
Liberal	John Nuraney	8,754	44.00	$51,211
New Democratic	Gabriel Yiu	8,355	42.00	$43,004
Green	Pauline Farrell	1,482	7.45	$225
Democratic Reform	Tony Kuo	947	4.76	$1,752
Marijuana	John Warrens	214	1.08	$0
Independent	Tom Tao	142	0.71	$0
Total		19,894	100.00	

== See also ==
- List of British Columbia provincial electoral districts
- Canadian provincial electoral districts
