= Ian Waddell =

Canadian politician (1942–2021)

Ian Waddell QC
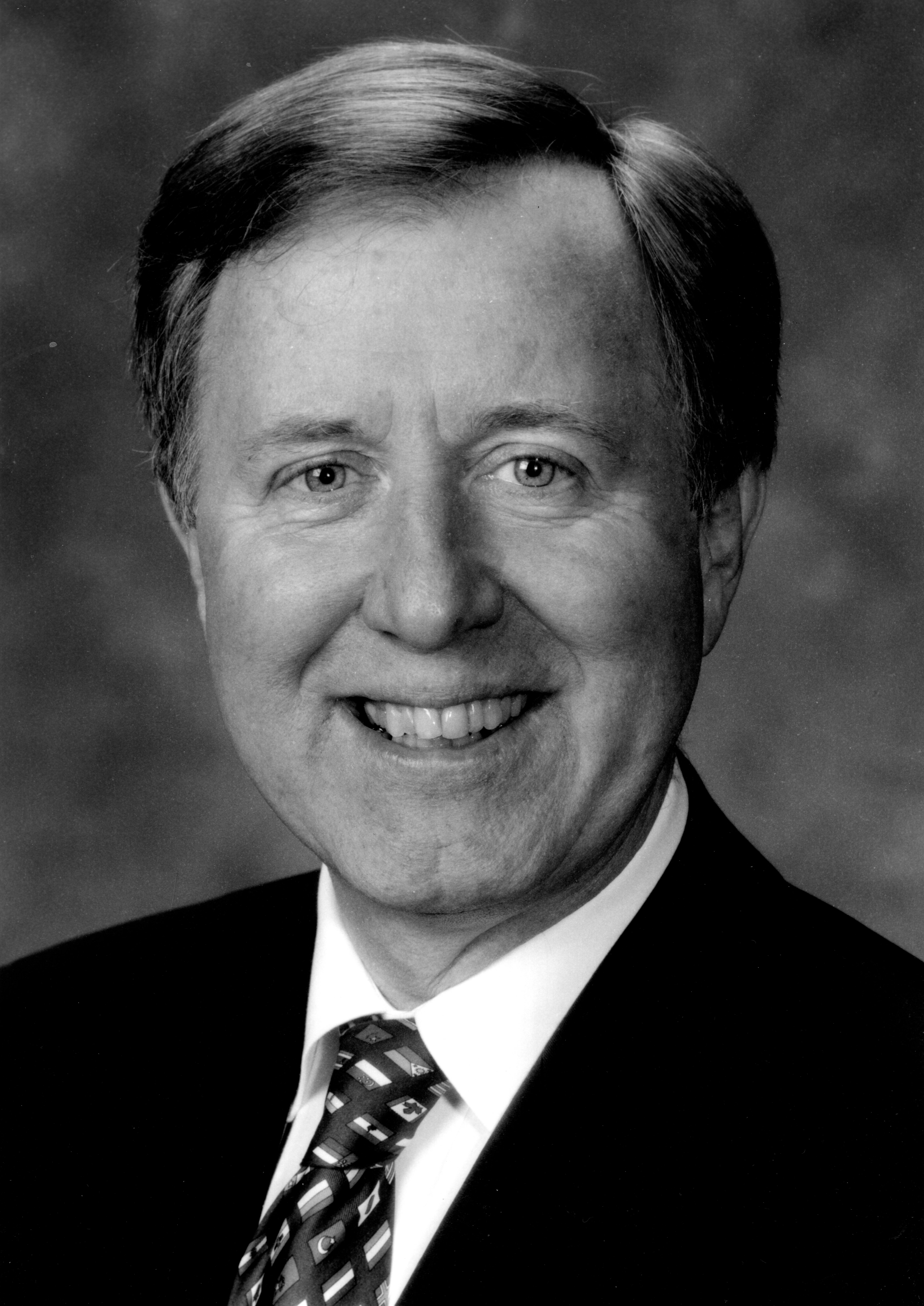

Minister of Environment, Lands and Parks of British Columbia
- In office November 1, 2000 – May 15, 2001
- Preceded by: Joan Sawicki
- Succeeded by: Joyce Murray

Minister of Small Business, Tourism and Culture of British Columbia
- In office February 18, 1998 – October 31, 2000
- Succeeded by: Gerard Janssen

Member of the British Columbia Legislative Assembly for Vancouver-Fraserview
- In office May 28, 1996 – May 16, 2001
- Preceded by: Bernie Simpson
- Succeeded by: Ken Johnston

Member of Parliament for Port Moody—Coquitlam—Port Coquitlam Vancouver Kingsway (1979–1988)
- In office May 22, 1979 – October 25, 1993
- Preceded by: Simma Holt
- Succeeded by: Sharon Hayes

Personal details
- Born: November 21, 1942 Glasgow, Scotland
- Died: March 15, 2021 (aged 78) Vancouver, British Columbia, Canada
- Party: New Democratic
- Other political affiliations: Liberal (before 1969)
- Education: University of Toronto; London School of Economics

Ian Gardiner Waddell QC (November 21, 1942 – March 15, 2021) was a Canadian politician, author and filmmaker. He served in the House of Commons of Canada from 1979 to 1993, and in the Legislative Assembly of British Columbia from 1996 to 2001.

== Early life and career ==
Waddell was born in Glasgow, Scotland, on November 21, 1942. His family immigrated to Canada when he was five. His father, Jack, worked as an electrician; his mother, Isabel, was employed as a waitress. The family moved to the suburbs of Toronto, initially staying in Scarborough, and later moved to Etobicoke. He studied history at the University of Toronto (U of T), graduating with a Bachelor of Arts in 1963. After receiving a teaching diploma from the Ontario College of Education that same year, he taught at Western Tech in Toronto. He then returned to U of T to study law, graduating with an LLB in 1967. Later he studied at the London School of Economics (LSE), from which he received a master's degree in international law.

Critical of the Law Society of Upper Canada, Waddell moved to Vancouver, British Columbia, where he articled at McTaggart, Ellis and Company. He worked as assistant city prosecutor for the City of Vancouver from 1971 to 1972, and then as a criminal defence lawyer. Later, as Legal Director at Community Legal Assistance Society, he was counsel on the first successful consumer class action in Canada. He went on to be counsel to Justice Tom Berger's landmark Mackenzie Valley Pipeline Inquiry (1974–1977), before becoming partner at DeCario & Waddell.

== Political career ==
Waddell supported the Liberal Party of Canada in his youth; he joined the Liberal club during his time at U of T, and chauffeured party leader Lester Pearson during the 1962 federal election campaign. During his time at LSE, he became convinced of the merits of social democracy, and with the realization that the British Columbia Liberal Party had a more conservative stance, he came to support the British Columbia New Democratic Party (BC NDP), canvassing for that party's candidates during the 1969 provincial election.

Waddell won the nomination as a New Democratic Party candidate in 1977, and ran for that party in the 1979 federal election, contesting the riding of Vancouver Kingsway. He won the seat with 45% of the vote, beating incumbent Liberal candidate Simma Holt, and was re-elected Member of Parliament (MP) for that riding in the 1980 and 1984 federal elections. He served as NDP's energy critic at the time of the National Energy Program, before covering other portfolios such as economic development, employment, fisheries and communications.

During the patriation of the Canadian constitution, Waddell participated in drafting Section 35 of the Constitution Act, 1982 and Section 92A of the Constitution Act, 1867; the former provides constitutional protection to the indigenous and treaty rights of indigenous peoples in Canada, while the latter gave provinces greater control over non-renewable natural resources.

With the dissolution of Vancouver Kingsway, Waddell instead contested the newly established riding of Port Moody—Coquitlam in the 1988 federal election. He was elected MP for that riding, and served as NDP's justice critic in the 34th Canadian Parliament. Following the resignation of Ed Broadbent as federal NDP leader in 1989, Waddell joined in the leadership race; he placed sixth in the first ballot before withdrawing. He sought re-election in Port Moody—Coquitlam in the 1993 federal election, but came in third with 21% of the vote, ending his 14-year career as MP.

As a BC NDP candidate in the 1996 provincial election, Waddell was elected to the Legislative Assembly of British Columbia to represent the riding of Vancouver-Fraserview, winning by 380 votes. He was appointed Minister of Small Business, Tourism and Culture in February 1998 by Premier Glen Clark. As minister, Waddell was responsible for the first Olympic bid for the 2010 Winter Olympics in Vancouver and Whistler, beating out well financed Calgary and political favourite Quebec City. He brought in a film tax credit, which created a billion dollar film industry in BC. He subsequently served as Minister of Environment, Lands and Parks under Ujjal Dosanjh from November 2000 to April 2001. He lost the Vancouver-Fraserview seat to Liberal candidate Ken Johnston in the 2001 provincial election.

In the 2004 federal election, Waddell ran for re-election to Parliament in the reconstituted district of Vancouver Kingsway, losing to Liberal candidate David Emerson. At this time, Waddell came out as bisexual. In a rematch between the two in the 2006 federal election, Waddell once again lost to Emerson.

== After politics ==
After leaving politics, Waddell worked as a consultant in environmental, governmental and aboriginal affairs. He was given the honorary title of Queen's Counsel in December 2013 for his exceptionally meritorious contribution to law. He also became a documentary film producer, winning the Best Producer Award in the 2016 Beverly Hills Film Festival alongside Dylan Playfair, Kyle McCachen and Robert Lang for their film The Drop: Why Young People Don't Vote.

Waddell released the political mystery novel A Thirst to Die For in 2002, and published his political memoir Take the Torch in 2018. He died on March 15, 2021, at his home in Vancouver from a heart condition at the age of 78.

== See also ==
- Jack Woodward
