= David Emerson =

Canadian businessman and politician

The Honourable David Emerson PC OBC

Minister of Foreign Affairs
- In office May 26, 2008 – October 20, 2008
- Prime Minister: Stephen Harper
- Preceded by: Maxime Bernier
- Succeeded by: Lawrence Cannon

Minister of International Trade
- In office February 6, 2006 – June 24, 2008
- Prime Minister: Stephen Harper
- Preceded by: Jim Peterson
- Succeeded by: Michael Fortier

Minister for the Pacific Gateway and the Vancouver-Whistler Olympics
- In office February 6, 2006 – June 25, 2008
- Prime Minister: Stephen Harper
- Preceded by: Office Established
- Succeeded by: Office Abolished

Minister of Industry
- In office July 20, 2004 – February 6, 2006
- Prime Minister: Paul Martin
- Preceded by: Lucienne Robillard
- Succeeded by: Maxime Bernier

Member of Parliament for Vancouver Kingsway
- In office June 28, 2004 – October 14, 2008
- Preceded by: Sophia Leung
- Succeeded by: Don Davies

Personal details
- Born: David Lee Emerson; September 17, 1945 (age 81) Montreal, Quebec, Canada
- Party: Conservative
- Other political affiliations: Liberal (2004–2006)
- Spouse: Theresa Yuek-Si Tang
- Education: University of Alberta; Queen's University
- Occupation: Financial executive, politician
- Profession: Economist

David Lee Emerson (born September 17, 1945) is a Canadian politician and economist who was the member of Parliament (MP) for Vancouver Kingsway from 2004 to 2008. First elected as a Liberal, Emerson served as minister of industry from 2004 to 2006 under Prime Minister Paul Martin. After the Conservatives formed government in the 2006 general election, Emerson crossed the floor and went on to serve as the minister of international trade from 2006 to 2008 and minister of foreign affairs in 2008 under Prime Minister Stephen Harper.

== Early life and business career ==
Born in Montreal, Quebec, Emerson grew up in Grande Prairie, Alberta. He attended the University of Alberta, obtaining his Bachelor of Economics degree in 1968 and his Master of Economics degree in 1970; he subsequently received his Ph.D in economics from Queen's University. After working as a researcher for the Economic Council of Canada, Emerson moved to British Columbia in 1975 and joined the provincial public service, becoming deputy minister of finance in 1984.

In 1986, Emerson was appointed president and chief executive officer of the Western & Pacific Bank of Canada. He transformed it into the Western Bank of Canada — the only regional bank to survive and prosper. Four years later, he returned as BC's deputy minister of finance, later becoming deputy minister to the premier and president of the British Columbia Trade Development Corporation. He left the BC government in 1992 to become the president and chief executive officer of the newly created Vancouver International Airport Authority.

In 1998, he was appointed president and chief executive officer of Canfor Corporation, a leading integrated forest products company and Canada's largest producer of softwood lumber. With 8,100 workers and annual revenues of $3.2 billion servicing 10% of the U.S. market, Canfor operates pulp and paper mills as well as 19 sawmills across British Columbia, two in Alberta and one in Quebec. Despite US duties and a higher Canadian dollar, Emerson managed to increase profits and raise share prices through a major acquisition deal and efficiency upgrades, which increased capacity by 30% while reducing production costs by 24%.

In 2008, Emerson joined private equity firm CAI Capital Management as a senior advisor.

Emerson's directorships included: Terasen Inc; Royal & Sun Alliance Insurance Company of Canada; vice-chairman of the Canadian Council of Chief Executives; Chair, British Columbia Ferry Services Inc.; and chairman and director of Genus Resource Management Technologies Inc.

== Election history ==
Bypassing the nomination process, Liberal leader Paul Martin appointed David Emerson as the party's candidate in Vancouver Kingsway for the 2004 election. In the general election, he narrowly defeated Ian Waddell of the New Democratic Party (NDP) by 1,351 votes. Waddell had previously represented Vancouver Kingsway from 1979 until 1988, when the riding was abolished and Waddell transferred to Port Moody—Coquitlam. Emerson was named to Martin's cabinet in July 2004 as minister of industry.

The 2006 election saw a rematch between Emerson and Waddell. Emerson won handily this time, defeating Waddell by nearly 10 points. Prior to the election, Emerson attracted some media attention in December 2005 with a comment that NDP leader Jack Layton had a "boiled dog's head smile". While the term is translated from the common and mild Cantonese insult "烚熟狗頭", Emerson said that he believed it to be a humorous phrase indicating a person with an "overextended grin". Emerson said that his wife, a Cantonese speaker, used the phrase to describe him when he posed for pictures.

== Crossing the floor ==
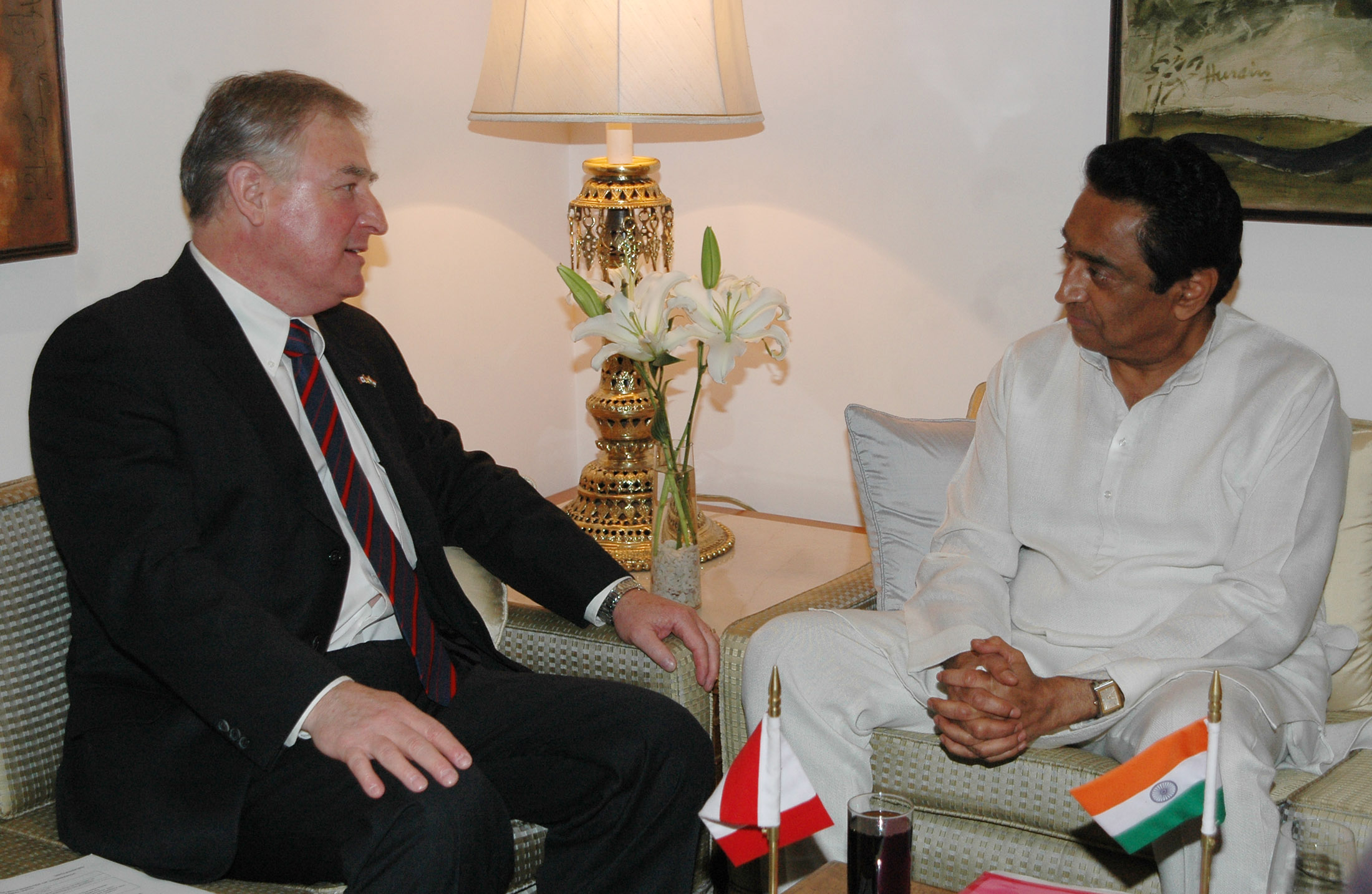
Emerson (left) meeting with India's Minister for Commerce & Industry, Shri Kamal Nath

At some point between election day and the day Stephen Harper was due to be sworn in as prime minister, Emerson accepted an offer from Harper to cross the floor and become Minister of International Trade in Harper's new Conservative minority government. According to Harper, gaining regional representation in cabinet from key metropolitan areas such as Vancouver was key to the decision in asking Emerson to cross the floor. Indeed, 2006 marked the first time in decades that a centre-right party had been completely shut out in Vancouver.

According to Emerson, British Columbia Conservative campaign coordinator John Reynolds called him after the election to ask if he was interested in having a conversation with Harper. However, Emerson's Conservative opponent Kanman Wong claimed on February 10, 2006, that Emerson was seriously considering crossing the floor during the run-up to the election. Wong added that he would have stood down in Emerson's favour had he done so.

In any case, Emerson's decision was kept secret from his Liberal colleagues, the press, and even most Conservatives until February 6, 2006, when he arrived at Rideau Hall, the official residence of the Governor General, for the swearing-in of the new government. In addition to his International Trade portfolio, Emerson was given responsibility for the Pacific Gateway and the 2010 Vancouver Winter Olympics, areas of particular importance to the riding of Vancouver-Kingsway, and in general the Greater Vancouver area. He was ranked third in Cabinet in the order of precedence, behind Harper and House Leader Rob Nicholson, by virtue of his appointment to the Privy Council in 2004.

Emerson had given no public indication that he was thinking of leaving the Liberal Party during the election campaign, Wong's remarks notwithstanding. As a cabinet minister he had been featured prominently in Liberal TV ads in British Columbia promoting that party as the best choice for voters. He launched several blistering attacks against Harper and the Conservatives during the campaign, including one assertion that under a Harper government, "the strong [would] survive and the weak die". On election night, he told supporters that he wanted to be "Stephen Harper's worst nightmare." In an interview with CTV after being sworn in, he clarified to reporters about the heated partisan rhetoric used during the campaign. Emerson told CTV that he ran his riding office on a nonpartisan basis, and that his first priority was the interests of the people of Vancouver Kingsway.

=== Controversy ===
Part of the Emerson controversy stemmed from Vancouver Kingsway's voting history. The riding has long been one of the more left-leaning ones in Vancouver; most election battles take place between the Liberals and NDP. Vancouver Kingsway previously existed from 1953 to 1988 and elected a Progressive Conservative (PC) candidate only once, when John Ferguson Browne won the riding during the 1958 Tory landslide. It has not elected a Conservative or any member of its predecessor parties—the PCs, the Reform Party of Canada or the Canadian Alliance—since its recreation in 1997. The Conservative candidate in 2006, Wong, finished a distant third with only 8,700 votes—12,000 votes behind Emerson and 7,000 behind Waddell—and 19% of the total vote. In the 2004 election, the Conservative candidate, Jesse Johl, finished with 16.5% of the vote. Both totals were far less than the combined PC/Canadian Alliance vote of 34.4% in 2000. The NDP's vote share of less than 16% in that 2000 election jumped to more than 37% when Emerson first ran in 2004.

Liberal MP and former Minister of Health, Ujjal Dosanjh noted that a poll held prior to the election showed less than 20 per cent of residents in the riding knew Emerson by name, lending credence to the assertions that the Liberal banner played a large part in his election and re-election.

Liberal National President Mike Eizenga said that Emerson knew "if he was running in that riding as a Conservative, he wouldn't have a chance" and demanded his resignation. Democracy Watch, a nonpartisan ethics watchdog, said it planned to complain to the Ethics Commissioner since Emerson was still technically a Liberal minister when he accepted Harper's offer. The group claimed that Emerson's switch violated the federal ethics code and post-employment regulations for officeholders. NDP MP Peter Julian also called for an inquiry, claiming that the additional benefits Emerson received as a member compared to those he would have received as an opposition MP carried at least the appearance that Emerson acted in his own private interest.

Bill Graham, acting parliamentary leader of the Liberal Party and Leader of the Opposition, called Emerson's behaviour cynical and claimed his actions diminished "the faith of citizens in a system under which we have to govern." Martin, who left on a vacation to Europe shortly after resigning as prime minister, was "astonished" by Emerson's defection and criticized both Emerson and Harper for avoiding "an appropriate level of scrutiny on this matter -- a decision that I believe robs Canadians and the people of Vancouver Kingsway of a deserved explanation".

Criticism also came from Emerson's fellow Conservatives. Garth Turner, a Conservative MP from Ontario said that "anyone who crosses the floor ultimately should go back to the people for ratification and I stick by it and hopefully in this case that will happen ..." Turner later stated his belief that his criticism "seriously limited" his future in the party. Subsequently, he was eventually kicked out of the Conservative caucus and crossed the floor to sit as a Liberal for which he was also criticized. Myron Thompson of Alberta also called for Emerson to step down and run in a by-election.

However, Peter MacKay told CTV's Mike Duffy Live that Emerson wanted to continue and finish the work he had already started as Minister of Industry under Martin on a multibillion-dollar softwood lumber deal with the United States—a deal that could potentially bring a huge windfall to Canada and particularly Emerson's major lumber producing province, British Columbia. MacKay later also said that there was no comparison between Emerson's switch and that of Belinda Stronach.

Reynolds also defended Emerson's switch, saying that Vancouver Kingsway got the better end of the bargain since "instead of having someone in opposition, they have someone who is a cabinet minister of a new government." As Minister of International Trade, Emerson would have key influence on matters relevant to constituents of Vancouver-Kingsway particularly as the Greater Vancouver area prepared for the 2010 Olympics. The defection also had the support of Vancouver Mayor Sam Sullivan, British Columbia Premier Gordon Campbell, the Vancouver Board of Trade, former Prime Minister Kim Campbell, as well as several prominent businessmen in Vancouver.

In a letter dated Monday February 6, the Vancouver Kingsway Liberal riding association requested that Emerson repay $97,000 spent during his re-election campaign. Emerson stated that he did not intend to repay any expenses, arguing that he had raised large sums for the Liberal party from his corporate connections. On February 8, 2006, Emerson described Liberal attacks on his defection as a sign of "deep sickness" and said that his children were being treated with hostility at school because of his defection. Harper called the attacks on Emerson "superficial," saying that the switch was made "in the best interests of not just British Columbia but good government". Emerson had given some thought to resigning over the furore, but told CBC News in Vancouver on February 10 that he would not resign or run in a by-election. Aside from that appearance, Emerson cancelled a telephone press conference on February 9 due to traffic.

The furore reinvigorated support for legislation requiring MPs who switch parties to step down and run for their own vacancy in a by-election. NDP MP Peter Stoffer announced on February 13 that he would reintroduce a private member's bill making such a provision. Turner planned to introduce a similar bill, despite pressure from his party to back off. Speaking on Vancouver radio station CKNW, Emerson said he would be glad to discuss the bill in Parliament: "I'll participate in that debate, I may even vote for it, and I will certainly abide by it." Stoffer's earlier floor-crossing bill (C-251) was defeated during the last Canadian Parliament. Emerson vowed to resign only if such a law were passed retroactively or if the ethics commissioner found him to be at fault.

A crowd of over 700 gathered at an NDP-organized protest rally in Emerson's riding on Saturday February 11. Another smaller rally took place at Emerson's riding office the next day. On April 2, a crowd, variously estimated between 1000 and 1200, participated in a march organized by a group calling themselves Real Democracy. At times, the tightly packed crowd stretched out over five blocks along one lane of Kingsway as the march proceeded along the two-kilometre route past Emerson's constituency office to the rally. The next day, another group flew an airplane over Canada's parliament asking the Member of Parliament to "call home". This was in reference to the fact that David Emerson had remained low key and made few public appearances in the riding for the months of February and March.

According to an online poll from The Globe and Mail, 77% of respondents wanted Emerson to step down and run in a by-election. A similar online poll conducted by Maclean's magazine showed 66% wanted Emerson to run in a by-election. Ipsos Reid in mid-February 2006 conducted a poll of British Columbians and found that even in staunchly Conservative areas of the province, respondents were 75% in favour of a by-election being called.

On March 3, 2006, Ethics Commissioner Bernard Shapiro announced that he was launching a preliminary inquiry into conflict-of-interest allegations against Emerson and Harper. Shapiro said he would look into what influence may have been wielded in the decision by Emerson to cross the floor. On March 20, 2006, Shapiro stated that he was "satisfied that no special inducement was offered by Mr. Harper to convince Mr. Emerson to join his cabinet and his party". He found no wrongdoing on Emerson's part and recommended a parliamentary debate on floor crossing.

== Resolution of softwood lumber issue ==
On April 27, 2006, Prime Minister Harper announced that Canada had reached an agreement with the United States on softwood lumber. Working closely with Minister Emerson and Canadian ambassador to the U.S. Michael Wilson, this landmark agreement resolved a dispute disrupting Canada–U.S. relations since 1982 when U.S. lumber producers first petitioned against Canadian softwood lumber imports under U.S. countervailing duty law. Previous Liberal governments had enacted two five-year deals, the last one expiring March 31, 2001. Since then, Canada had been locked in costly domestic and international litigation as U.S. lumber companies charged Canada with dumping subsidized lumber into the U.S. market.

The softwood lumber deal ensured no quotas or tariffs at current lumber prices, repayment of at least $4 billion in unfairly collected duties to lumber companies, and provincial and regional flexibility depending on operating conditions. "Canada’s bargaining position was strong; our conditions were clear; and this agreement delivers", said the prime minister. "It’s a good deal that resolves this long-standing dispute and allows us to move on." The deal also received support from Canada's three major softwood producing provinces, British Columbia, Quebec and Ontario.

Following the initial announcement, the province of British Columbia expressed dissatisfaction with the agreement's details. Claiming industry support, BC's forestry minister, Rich Coleman, threatened to "derail the deal" if the provincial government's concerns were not met. Under contention were several details, including an "opt-out" clause (allowing either Canadian or U.S. governments to back out of the deal after 23 months).

A number of analysts described the deal as a shameful capitulation of Canadian interests. The deal included language requiring all Canadian companies to drop legal actions against the U.S. government.

On September 12, 2006, Emerson and U.S Trade Representative Susan Schwab officially signed the deal in Ottawa. The softwood lumber deal was passed on December 6, 2006, and received Royal Assent on December 12, 2006.

== Foreign Affairs ministry ==
On May 26, 2008, Emerson was appointed Minister of Foreign Affairs following the resignation of Maxime Bernier, though it was reported at the time that Emerson's appointment to the position would be brief. In a cabinet shuffle on June 25, 2008, Prime Minister Harper finalized Emerson's position as Minister of Foreign Affairs.

== After politics ==
On September 2, 2008, it was reported that Emerson would not run in the 2008 federal election, citing the lengthy commute from Vancouver to Ottawa as the reason. He instead served as national campaign co-chair for the Conservatives in that election.

Emerson was named executive chair of the British Columbia Transmission Corporation in November 2008. In 2009, he was named co-chair (with Paul Tellier) of the Prime Minister's Advisory Committee on the Public Service. He also became a member of the International Advisory Council of the Chinese sovereign wealth fund China Investment Corporation. He was appointed trade envoy by the government of British Columbia in February 2017 and tasked to work with the federal government to reach a new softwood lumber deal with the United States following the expiration of the previous agreement.

He was awarded the Order of British Columbia in 2011.

28th Canadian Ministry (2006–2015) – Cabinet of Stephen Harper
Cabinet posts (2)
Predecessor	Office	Successor
Maxime Bernier	Minister of Foreign Affairs; 2008	Lawrence Cannon
Jim Peterson	Minister of International Trade; 2006–2008	Michael Fortier
27th Canadian Ministry (2003–2006) – Cabinet of Paul Martin
Cabinet post (1)
Predecessor	Office	Successor
Lucienne Robillard	Minister of Industry; 2004–2006	Maxime Bernier
