= Vancouver-Fraserview =

Provincial electoral district in British Columbia, Canada

British Columbia electoral district
- Interactive map of riding boundaries

Provincial electoral district
- Legislature: Legislative Assembly of British Columbia
MLA
Deep Sandhu
Conservative
- First contested: 1991
- Last contested: 2026

Demographics
- Population (2021): 58,686
- Area (km²): 12
- Pop. density (per km²): 4,890.5
- Census division: Metro Vancouver
- Census subdivision: Vancouver (part)

Vancouver-Fraserview is a provincial electoral district for the Legislative Assembly of British Columbia.

Created under the 1991 British Columbia electoral redistribution, the district was first contested in the 1991 general election. It was created from parts of Vancouver South and Vancouver East.

== Demographics ==
Population, 2021	58,686
Area (km^{2})	12
Pop. Density (people per km^{2})	4,890
Source: BC Electoral Boundaries Commission

== Geography ==
Located in southeastern Vancouver, the district comprises the neighbourhoods of Sunset, Victoria–Fraserview and Killarney. It is bordered by the Fraser River to the south and Boundary Road to the east.

== Members of the Legislative Assembly ==
This riding has elected the following members of the Legislative Assembly:

Assembly	Years	Member	Party
Vancouver-Fraserview; Riding created from Vancouver East and Vancouver South
35th	1991–1996	Bernie Simpson	New Democratic
36th	1996–2001	Ian Waddell	New Democratic
37th	2001–2005	Ken Johnston	Liberal
38th	2005–2009	Wally Oppal	Liberal
39th	2009–2013	Kash Heed	Liberal
40th	2013–2017	Suzanne Anton	Liberal
41st	2017–2020	George Chow	New Democratic
42nd	2020–2024	George Chow	New Democratic
43rd	2024–2026	George Chow	New Democratic
44th	2026–present	Deep Sandhu	Conservative

== History ==
Vancouver-Fraserview is a swing riding which has consistently elected MLAs from the party that formed government since its creation in 1991, often with competitive margin.

It also served as launching pad for numerous high-profile candidates from both major parties.

- 1996 — Ian Waddell, former MP for Vancouver Kingsway 1979–1988 (when it covered a significant portion of the riding) and Port Moody—Coquitlam—Port Coquitlam 1988–93, candidate in the 1989 federal NDP leadership contest. Subsequently appointed by Premier Glen Clark as Minister of Small Business, Tourism and Culture, with responsibility of the successful 2010 Winter Olympic bid, and by Premier Ujjal Dosanjh as Minister of Environment, Lands and Parks.
- 2005 — Wally Oppal, prominent justice of the British Columbia Court of Appeal, former lead commissioner of inquiry into policing in British Columbia. Appointed Attorney General immediately after election by Premier Gordon Campbell
- 2009 — Kash Heed, first Indo-Canadian police chief in Canada, former superintendent of the Vancouver Police Department and chief constable of the West Vancouver Police Department. Appointed Minister of Public Safety and Solicitor General immediately after election by Campbell
- 2013 — Suzanne Anton, 2011 Non-Partisan Association's candidate for Mayor of Vancouver, former Vancouver Councillor and Park Board Commissioner. Appointed Attorney General immediately after election by Premier Christy Clark
- 2017 — George Chow, former Vancouver Councillor and Park Board Commissioner. Appointed Minister of State for Trade immediately after election by Premier John Horgan

Since its inception in 1991 until the 2020 re-election of George Chow, this district has never had an MLA that has served more than one term.

== Election results ==
2026 British Columbia general election
Party	Candidate	Votes	%	±%	Expenditures
Conservative	Deep Sandhu	7,156	44.03	+7.43	
New Democratic	Aman Singh	6,767	41.65	-15.55	
Green	Françoise Raunet	2,302	14.16	+7.96	
Total valid votes		16,253			
Total rejected ballots					
Turnout					
Registered voters					
Conservative gain from New Democratic		Swing		+11.49	
Source: Elections BC

2024 British Columbia general election
Party	Candidate	Votes	%	±%	Expenditures
New Democratic	George Chow	11,896	57.2%	+0.83	
Conservative	Jag S. Sanghera	7,618	36.6%		
Green	Françoise Raunet	1,291	6.2%	-2.86	
Total valid votes		20,805	–		
Total rejected ballots					
Turnout					
Registered voters					
Source: Elections BC

2020 British Columbia general election
Party	Candidate	Votes	%	±%	Expenditures
New Democratic	George Chow	12,247	56.37	+7.80	$42,403.53
Liberal	David Grewal	7,511	34.57	−7.65	$64,241.50
Green	Françoise Raunet	1,969	9.06	+1.34	$243.99
Total valid votes		21,727	100.00	–	
Total rejected ballots		170	0.78	−0.27	
Turnout		21,897	50.22	−10.33	
Registered voters		43,602			
New Democratic hold		Swing		+0.08	
Source: Elections BC

2018 British Columbia electoral reform referendum
Side	Votes	%
First Past the Post	10,182	67.33
Proportional Representation	4,940	32.67
Total valid votes	15,122	100.0
Total rejected ballots	126	0.83
Source: Elections BC

2017 British Columbia general election
Party	Candidate	Votes	%	±%	Expenditures
New Democratic	George Chow	11,487	48.57	+4.01	$68,196
Liberal	Suzanne Anton	9,985	42.22	-4.52	$69,911
Green	Eric Kolotyluk	1,826	7.72	+2.04	$2,357
Libertarian	Hiroshi Hyde	179	0.76	–	$56
Your Political Party	Harpreet S. Bajwa	174	0.73	–	$8,399
Total valid votes		23,651	100.00	–	
Total rejected ballots		252	1.05	-0.1	
Turnout		23,903	60.55	+5.59	
Registered voters		39,479			
Source: Elections BC

B.C. general election 2013: Vancouver-Fraserview
Party	Candidate	Votes	%	±	Expenditures
Liberal	Suzanne Anton	10,118	46.74%		$91,618
New Democratic	Gabriel Yiu	9,648	44.56%		$107,004
Green	Stuart Mackinnon	1,230	5.68%		$2,989
Conservative	Rajiv Pandey	653	3.02%	–	$9,904
Total valid votes		21,649	100%		
Total rejected ballots		251	1.15		
Turnout		21,900	54.96%		

B.C. general election 2009: Vancouver-Fraserview
Party	Candidate	Votes	%	±	Expenditures
Liberal	Kash Heed	9,549	49.29%	+1.49%	$105,420
New Democratic	Gabriel Yiu	8,801	45.43%	+3.00%	$97,038
Green	Jodie Emery	904	4.67%	-1.97%	$8,279
Refederation	Andrew Stevano	118	0.61%	–	$260
Total valid votes		19,372	100%		
Total rejected ballots		175	0.90%		
Turnout		19,547	51.09%		

B.C. general election 2005: Vancouver-Fraserview
Party	Candidate	Votes	%	±	Expenditures
Liberal	Wally Oppal	9,895	47.80%		$195,304
NDP	Ravinder Gill	8,783	42.43%		$55,698
Green	Doug Perry	1,374	6.64%	–	$2,223
Marijuana	Shea Campbell	650	3.13%		$100
Total valid votes		20,702	100%		
Total rejected ballots		286	1.38%		
Turnout		20,988	57.96%		

B.C. general election 2001: Vancouver-Fraserview
Party	Candidate	Votes	%	±	Expenditures
Liberal	Ken Johnston	10,361	56.84%		$43,542
NDP	Ian Waddell	5,815	31.91%		$28,396
Green	Merina Matthew	1,417	7.77%	–	$197
Unity	Paul Stilwell	369	2.02%		
Marijuana	Paul Emerson Hughes	267	1.46%		$394
Total valid votes		18,229	100.00%		
Total rejected ballots		150	0.82%		
Turnout		18,379	71.61%		

B.C. General Election 1996: Vancouver-Fraserview
Party	Candidate	Votes	%	±	Expenditures
NDP	Ian Waddell	8,774	45.97%		$41,504
Liberal	Gulzar Singh Cheema	8,394	43.98%		$53,524
Progressive Democrat	Andy Wong	815	4.27%	–	$2,073
Green	Stephen Samuel	225	1.18%	–	$307
Reform	Tim Shreeve	643	3.37%		$2,189
Social Credit	T. Glen Lockhart	177	0.93%	–	$1,118
Natural Law	Prince Pabbies	57	0.30%		$139
Total valid votes		19,085	100.00%		
Total rejected ballots		143	0.74%		
Turnout		19,228	71.94%		

B.C. General Election 1991: Vancouver-Fraserview
Party	Candidate	Votes	%	±	Expenditures
NDP	Bernie Simpson	8,016	44.16%		$43,735
Liberal	Rod Raglin	5,837	32.15%		$6,541
Social Credit	Jonathan Baker	4,060	22.37%	–	$25,231
Green	Stuart Parker	141	0.78%	–	
Libertarian	John Clarke	98	0.54%		
Total valid votes		18,152	100.00%		
Total rejected ballots		520	2.78%		
Turnout		18,672	73.08%		

== Student vote results ==
Student Vote Canada is a non-partisan program in Canada that holds mock elections in elementary and high schools alongside general elections (with the same candidates and same electoral system).

2020 British Columbia general election
Party	Candidate	Votes	%	±%
New Democratic	George Chow	173	47.40	+0.64
Green	Françoise Raunet	133	36.44	+15.91
Liberal	David Grewal	59	16.16	−8.65
Total valid votes		365	100.00	–
Source: Student Vote Canada

2017 British Columbia general election
Party	Candidate	Votes	%	±%
New Democratic	George Chow	1,082	46.76	+11.17
Liberal	Suzanne Anton	574	24.81	-9.69
Green	Eric Kolotyluk	475	20.53	+1.1
Your Political Party	Harpreet S. Bajwa	113	4.88	–
Libertarian	Hiroshi Hyde	70	3.03	–
Total valid votes		2,314	100.0	–
Source: Student Vote Canada

2013 British Columbia general election
Party	Candidate	Votes	%	±%
New Democratic	Gabriel Yu	163	35.59	+3.35
Liberal	Suzanne Anton	158	34.5	-5.82
Green	Stuart Mackinnon	89	19.43	-2.79
Conservative	Rajiv Pandey	48	10.48	–
Total valid votes		458	100.0	–
Source: Student Vote Canada

2009 British Columbia general election
Party	Candidate	Votes	%
Liberal	Kash P. Heed	127	40.32
New Democratic	Gabriel Yu	111	32.24
Green	Jodie Joanna Emery	70	22.22
Refederation	Andrew Stevano	7	2.22
Total valid votes		315	100.0
Source: Student Vote Canada

== See also ==
- List of British Columbia provincial electoral districts
- Canadian provincial electoral districts
