= Kash Heed =

Canadian politician (born 1955)

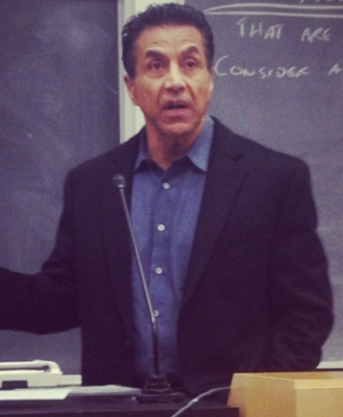

Richmond City Councillor
- In office 2022 – November 2, 2026

Member of the British Columbia Legislative Assembly for Vancouver-Fraserview
- In office May 12, 2009 – May 13, 2013
- Preceded by: Wally Oppal
- Succeeded by: Suzanne Anton

Minister of Public Safety and Solicitor General of British Columbia
- In office May 4, 2010 – May 5, 2010
- Premier: Gordon Campbell
- Preceded by: Michael de Jong
- Succeeded by: Michael de Jong
- In office June 10, 2009 – April 9, 2010
- Preceded by: Rich Coleman
- Succeeded by: Michael de Jong

Personal details
- Born: November 1955 (age 70–71)
- Party: Richmond Rise
- Other political affiliations: BC Liberal
- Occupation: Police officer

Kash Heed (born November 1955) is a Canadian politician and former police officer. He previously served as a member of Richmond City Council from 2022 to 2026 and also as a member of the Legislative Assembly of British Columbia, representing the riding of Vancouver-Fraserview as a member of the BC Liberal Party from 2009 to 2013. From 2009 to 2010, he was Minister of Public Safety and Solicitor General in the Campbell ministry.

Before entering politics, he served on the Vancouver Police Department, reaching the rank of superintendent. He then served as chief constable of the West Vancouver Police Department from 2007 to 2009, becoming the first Indo-Canadian police chief in Canada.

== Policing ==
A resident of Richmond, British Columbia, since 1965, Heed graduated from the British Columbia Police Academy in 1979 and began his career as an officer with the Vancouver Police Department (VPD). As an inspector he was commander of District 3, which corresponds to the southeast quadrant of Vancouver; he was in charge of the south part of Vancouver after becoming superintendent. Other roles in his career with the VPD have included heading the drug squad and Indo-Canadian gang task force, as well as implementing the department's COMPSTAT information technology system.

In June 2007 he lost out to Deputy Chief Jim Chu for the position of chief constable of the VPD but, days later, was appointed to that title in West Vancouver. He led the West Vancouver Police Department for 19 months before resigning on February 23, 2009. During his time as chief constable, Heed advocated the creation of a regional police force to fight gang crime.

He is a published author who also teaches criminology and criminal justice at two BC colleges.

== Provincial politics ==
On April 8, 2009, Heed announced he would run for the BC Liberal Party in the riding of Vancouver-Fraserview in that year's provincial election; he was called a star candidate for the party. During his campaign, Heed used photos of himself wearing a police uniform in his campaign materials; his main opponent, Gabriel Yiu of the New Democratic Party (NDP), suggested that this was improper. Heed defeated Yiu by 748 votes to become the riding's member of the Legislative Assembly and was appointed to the BC cabinet as Minister of Public Safety and Solicitor General on June 10, 2009. His responsibilities under this portfolio included crime prevention, law enforcement, victim services, road safety and emergency preparedness.

Heed resigned his ministerial post on April 9, 2010, in response to an unspecified Royal Canadian Mounted Police investigation regarding violations of the Elections Act involving his campaign office, becoming the third consecutive solicitor-general to step down in a 25-month period. The investigation revealed that his campaign team distributed unregistered brochures targeting the NDP, but special prosecutor Terry Robertson exonerated Heed of involvement, and he returned to cabinet on May 4, 2010. Less than 24 hours later, the special prosecutor himself resigned when it was discovered that the law firm he came from had made financial contributions to the election campaign of Heed's party, the BC Liberals. Heed once again stepped down pending a more detailed probe into the case.

The distribution of the unregistered brochures brought Heed's campaign above the spending limit; he admitted to exceeding the limit by $5,579 but denied knowing of it at the time. The court revised the overspent amount to $4,000, and Heed was fined $8,000 (twice the overspend) but was allowed to keep his seat in the legislature and cleared of criminal wrongdoing. He did not run for re-election in 2013.

== Radio broadcasting ==
In 2016, Heed started as the morning talk show host for 107.7 Pulse FM, a new English-language radio station based in Surrey; he left the station in February 2017.

Heed was critical of the handling of the escape of Robbie Alkhalil from the North Fraser Pretrial Centre, saying on July 26, 2022: "I have never in my 32 years in policing, and my time since policing, seen such an inept investigation on a suspected murderer that has escaped from one of our secure institutions. ... I'm not sure. But do we have confidence that the investigation will lead us or give us the answers? No, I don't have the confidence in it."

== Municipal politics ==
Heed announced in August 2022 that he was standing for a seat on the Richmond City Council in that year's municipal elections. His bid was supported by councillor Derek Dang, and the two formed a joint slate as Richmond Rise; Heed also mulled standing for mayor in the future. On October 15, 2022, Heed was elected to council, taking the last of eight seats.

In February 2024, Heed put forth a motion alongside Councillor Laura Gillanders to consider implementing a supervised consumption site at Richmond Hospital. The proposal drew backlash from the community, with over 16,000 signing a petition against the construction of a consumption site. The motion passed by a margin of 7–2; however, Mayor Malcolm Brodie said that the city would not seek approval for a site.

On October 23, 2025, Heed announced that he would run for mayor in the 2026 municipal election. He proposed a three-term limit for mayors, and holding referendums for large-scale municipal capital projects. He placed third behind Rob Howard and Alexa Loo.

== See also ==
- Indo-Canadians in Greater Vancouver
