= Deep Sandhu =

Canadian politician

Deep Sandhu MLA

Member of the Legislative Assembly for Vancouver-Fraserview
- Incumbent
- Assumed office October 24, 2026
- Preceded by: George Chow

Personal details
- Party: Conservative
- Website: website

Deep Sandhu MLA is a Canadian politician who is the Member of the British Columbia Legislative Assembly for Vancouver-Fraserview since the 2026 British Columbia general election.

Sandhu is a graduate of the University of Northern British Columbia and was a reservist in the Canadian Armed Forces. He is also the chief investment officer of Massive Canada Building Systems.

== Electoral record ==
2026 British Columbia general election: Vancouver-Fraserview
Party	Candidate	Votes	%	±%	Expenditures
Conservative	Deep Sandhu	7,156	44.03	+7.43	
New Democratic	Aman Singh	6,767	41.65	-15.55	
Green	Françoise Raunet	2,302	14.16	+7.96	
Total valid votes		16,253			
Total rejected ballots					
Turnout					
Registered voters					
Conservative gain from New Democratic		Swing		+11.49	
Source: Elections BC
