= Gabriel Yiu =

Canadian activist

- Born: Hong Kong
- Occupations: Journalist, social activist and businessman

Gabriel Yiu is a Hong Kong-born Canadian award-winning journalist, social activist and businessman.

== Background ==
Yiu was born and educated in Hong Kong. He worked in his father's trading business before becoming the administrator of an arts institution. He went on to become administrator of an independent organization specializing in the study and critique of Hong Kong's arts and cultural policies. Yiu was a fellow of the Asian Cultural Council and a respected figure in the arts community.

Immigrating to Canada in 1991, Yiu and wife Angela started what is now a successful floral business in Vancouver.

Time featured Gabriel as one of the six "People to Watch" in Vancouver. He received the Cultural Harmony Award from the City of Vancouver.

Yiu has served on numerous boards: International Centre for Asian Contemporary Arts, The Dance Centre, JumpStart Performing Society, BC Newspaper Foundation, La Salle Old Boys’ Association, Vancouver Hong Kong Forum Society. He is an advisor to the UBC Museum of Anthropology.

== Media career ==
An award-winning journalist in the Chinese media, Yiu was assignment editor of Ming Pao Daily's weekend magazine, and later columnist for the Vancouver Sun, also serving on the newspaper's community editorial board. He has written columns for many newspapers and magazines, including Vancouver Sun, Business in Vancouver, Ming Pao, World Journal and Global Chinese Press, and hosted popular television and radio shows for local Chinese stations.

== Political career ==
A community activist, Yiu fought for Chinese Head Tax redress and against the closure of Mount St. Joseph Hospital's emergency room. He successfully campaigned against the federal government's Bill C-51, which would regulate natural health product and traditional Chinese medicine as pharmaceutical drugs. Together with MLA Jenny Kwan, he campaigned to have China's Kaiping Watchtower recognized as a world heritage site.

Yiu was a prominent organizer in the anti-HST campaign, that successfully fought for the repeal of the Harmonized Sales Tax in British Columbia.

In 2005, Yiu was the BC NDP candidate in Burnaby-Willingdon, where he was narrowly defeated by John Nuraney.

In 2009, Yiu was the BC NDP candidate in Vancouver-Fraserview, where he was defeated by BC Liberal candidate and former Police Chief Kash Heed. Kash Heed was later fined $8,000 for an Elections Act violation for over-spending the campaign limit and two other individuals in the Liberal campaign were found guilty of violations of the Elections Act.

In 2011, Yiu won the BC NDP nomination to represent Vancouver-Fraserview again in the 2013 provincial election, in which he was defeated by BC Liberal Suzanne Anton by 470 votes.

== See also ==
- Chinese Canadians in British Columbia
