= Wally Oppal =

Canadian politician

Wally Oppal OBC KC
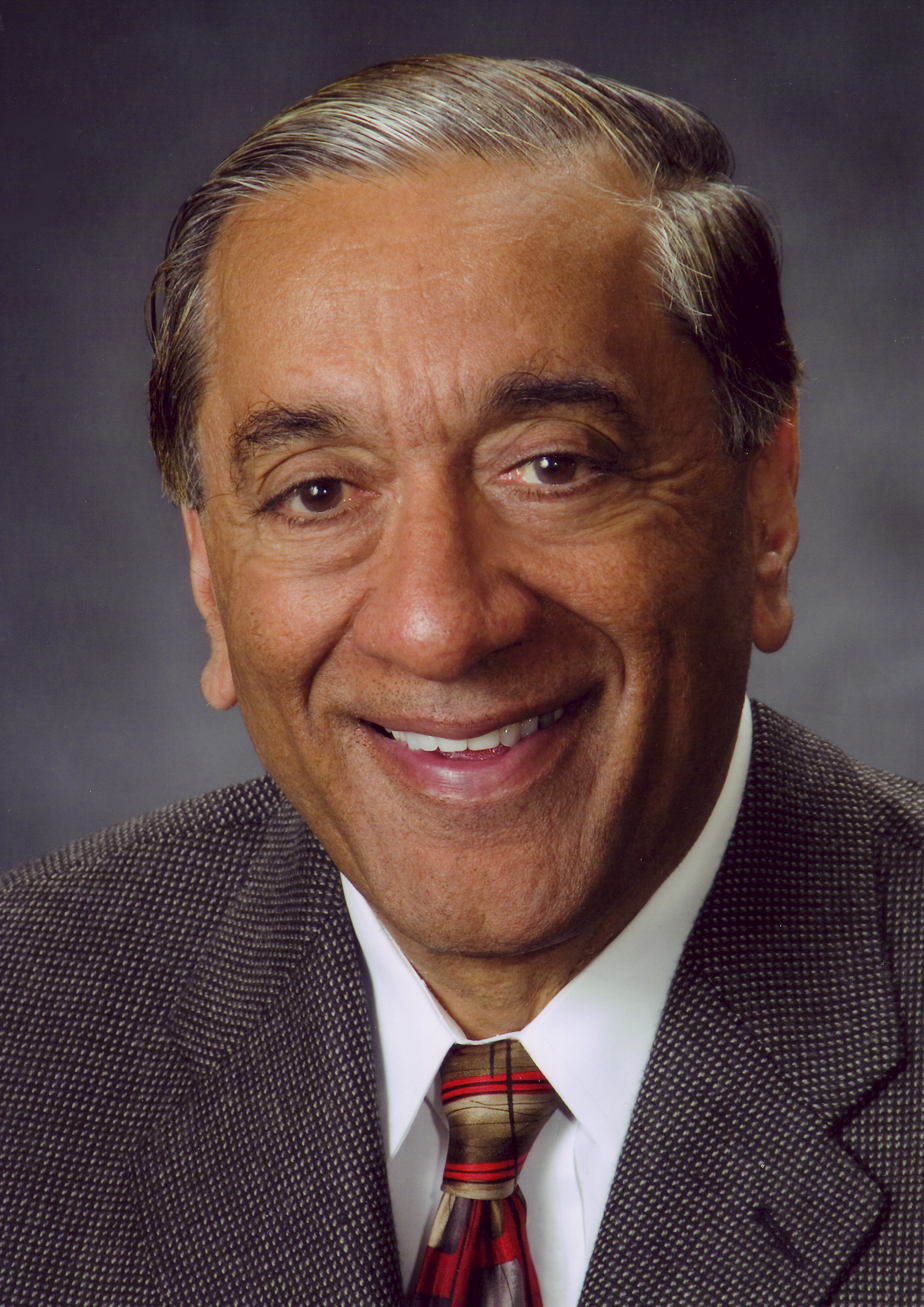

Member of the British Columbia Legislative Assembly for Vancouver-Fraserview
- In office May 17, 2005 – May 12, 2009
- Preceded by: Ken Johnston
- Succeeded by: Kash Heed

Attorney General of British Columbia
- In office June 16, 2005 – June 10, 2009
- Premier: Gordon Campbell
- Preceded by: Geoff Plant
- Succeeded by: Michael de Jong

Minister responsible for Multiculturalism of British Columbia
- In office June 16, 2005 – June 10, 2009
- Premier: Gordon Campbell
- Preceded by: Patrick Wong
- Succeeded by: Ben Stewart

Personal details
- Born: Wallace Taroo Oppal; 1940 (age 85–86) Vancouver, British Columbia, Canada
- Party: BC Liberal
- Occupation: lawyer, judge

Wallace Taroo "Wally" Oppal, OBC KC (born 1940) is a Canadian lawyer, former judge and provincial politician. Between 2005 and 2009, he served as British Columbia's Attorney General and Minister responsible for Multiculturalism, as well as Member of the Legislative Assembly of British Columbia for the riding of Vancouver-Fraserview as part of the BC Liberals.

== Early life and career ==
The elder of two sons of Gurdial Kaur Oppal, Oppal was born in Vancouver to Sikh immigrant parents from India. The whole family moved to the Lake Cowichan area after his father co-founded a sawmill with a partner there. After his father died when he was 10 years old, his mother worked as a housekeeper. He attended Lake Cowichan High School where he served as student council president in his senior year, and graduated in 1958.

After briefly working as a radio announcer, he began attending the University of British Columbia (UBC), supplementing his income by working at sawmills during the summer. He graduated with a B.A. from UBC in 1963, followed by a law degree from the UBC Faculty of Law in 1966. He was called to the bar in 1967 and began working at Thompson McConnell, eventually starting a private practice in South Vancouver with friend John Campbell.

At the recommendation of then-Chief Justice of the Supreme Court of British Columbia Allan McEachern, Oppal was appointed to the County Court of Vancouver in 1981, and to the BC Supreme Court in 1985. In 2003, he was appointed to the British Columbia Court of Appeal where he served until he resigned to seek election to the provincial legislature. He was appointed to lead a commission of inquiry into policing in British Columbia in June 1992, and published a report in 1994, leading to policing reforms in the province.

== Member of the legislature ==
At a meeting with then Prime Minister Paul Martin, Oppal was asked to run in a federal election for the Liberal Party of Canada, but declined for family reasons. He later entered provincial politics instead, when he announced his candidacy for the BC Liberals in the riding of Vancouver-Fraserview in April 2005. He was elected Member of the Legislative Assembly (MLA) at the 2005 provincial election, and was appointed the province's Attorney General and Minister responsible for Multiculturalism that June, becoming BC's second Indo-Canadian Attorney-General (the first being Ujjal Dosanjh). He became Queen's Counsel upon his appointment as Attorney General.

For the 2009 provincial election, Oppal switched to the riding of Delta South where he lives. In initial results on election night, Oppal led in Delta South by a margin of just two votes over independent candidate Vicki Huntington.

On May 26, 2009, a recount revealed that Huntington had defeated Oppal by only 32 votes. A judicial recount on June 2 confirmed Huntington's victory.

== After politics ==
In 2010, Oppal was appointed to lead the Missing Women Commission of Inquiry into the Robert Pickton murders. The commission released its final report to the public in December 2012, including 63 recommendations.

Oppal served as the Chancellor of the Thompson Rivers University in Kamloops from 2011 to 2018, and was named Chancellor Emeritus upon the end of his terms. In 2019 he was appointed to chair a committee to oversee the creation of a new municipal police force in the city of Surrey, which would replace the Royal Canadian Mounted Police.

Oppal was appointed to the Order of British Columbia on November 30, 2017.

He is senior counsel at Boughton Law.

== Personal life ==
Oppal is married with two children. He announced in March 2007 that he was undergoing treatment for prostate cancer. By the end of the month, Oppal was declared cancer free by his doctor.

== See also ==
- Indo-Canadians in Greater Vancouver
