= George Chow =

Canadian politician

- 周烱華
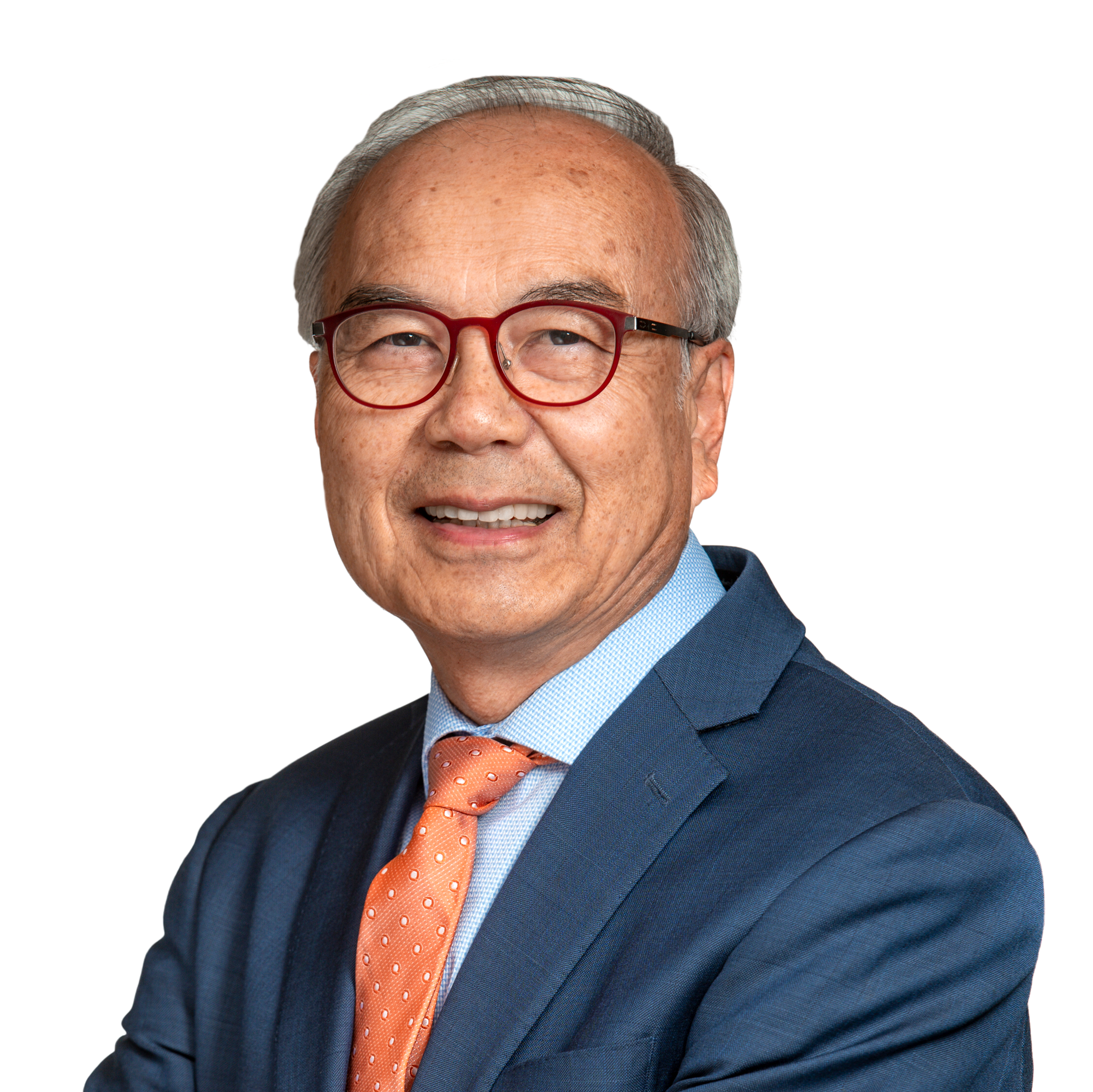
- Campaign portrait, 2020

Minister of Citizens' Services of British Columbia
- In office February 20, 2024 – July 17, 2025
- Premier: David Eby
- Preceded by: Lisa Beare
- Succeeded by: Diana Gibson

Minister of State for Trade of British Columbia
- In office July 18, 2017 – December 7, 2022
- Premier: John Horgan; David Eby
- Preceded by: Position established
- Succeeded by: Jagrup Brar

Member of the British Columbia Legislative Assembly for Vancouver-Fraserview
- In office May 9, 2017 – October 24, 2026
- Preceded by: Suzanne Anton
- Succeeded by: Deep Sandhu

Vancouver City Councillor
- In office November 19, 2005 – December 5, 2011

Personal details
- Born: 1950 or 1951 China
- Party: BC NDP (provincial)
- Other political affiliations: Vision Vancouver (municipal)
- Education: University of British Columbia

George Chow
- Traditional Chinese: 周烱華
- Simplified Chinese: 周烱华
Transcriptions
Yue: Cantonese
- Jyutping: Zau1 Gwing2 Waa4

George Chow (Chinese: 周烱華) is a Canadian politician. He was elected to the Legislative Assembly of British Columbia in the 2017 provincial election, representing the riding of Vancouver-Fraserview. A member of the British Columbia New Democratic Party (BC NDP), he served in the cabinets of Premiers John Horgan and David Eby. Chow served as Minister of Citizens' Services from 2024 to 2025. Previously, he was the Minister of State for Trade from 2017 to 2022.

Prior to entering provincial politics, Chow served two terms as a Vancouver City Councillor, elected as a member of the Vision Vancouver party in 2005 and 2008.

== Background ==
Chow was born in China in either 1950 or 1951, and emigrated to Canada from Hong Kong in 1965 at the age of 14 and settled in Vancouver. His father was a cook, and his mother a farm worker. After immigrating, Chow grew up in the Downtown Eastside. He initially enrolled at William Dawson School and then transferred to Britannia Secondary School. He went on to complete a degree in mechanical engineering at the University of British Columbia.

Prior to his election to the provincial legislature, Chow worked at BC Hydro for over 30 years, where he worked part-time when he was a councillor.

He was actively involved with the building of the Chinese Cultural Centre in Vancouver's Chinatown during the 1970s and 1980s. He also served on many community organizations as a volunteer including: the Urban Spirit Foundation, Vancouver Public Library Board, Chinese Cultural Centre of Greater Vancouver, Boys and Girls Clubs of South Coast BC, Chinese Benevolent Association of Vancouver, Vancouver Chinatown Merchants Association, S.U.C.C.E.S.S., and various family associations.

== Political career ==
=== Vancouver City Council ===
He first ran for council as an independent in 2002 because of his opposition to the proposed safe injection site in the Downtown Eastside near Chinatown. Chow reassessed his position on the safe injection site following its 2003 opening and was subsequently recruited by Vision Vancouver to join its slate for his successful 2005 campaign. He was re-elected for a second term in 2008.

=== Provincial Legislature ===
During the 2013 British Columbia general election, Chow contested the seat for Vancouver-Langara, a constituency which has only returned Liberal MLAs since its creation in 1991. The incumbent, Moira Stilwell, was viewed as vulnerable due to her aborted leadership campaign and subsequent demotion from cabinet. Chow was unsuccessful in his bid, losing to Stilwell by over 2700 votes (24%).

In the 2017 British Columbia general election, Chow contested Vancouver-Fraserview, a swing riding which has consistently elected MLAs from the party that formed government since its creation in 1991 and a launching pad for numerous high-profile candidates from both major parties. Chow defeated incumbent Attorney General Suzanne Anton. Like his three immediate predecessors, Chow was elevated to cabinet at the first shuffle after his election. He was re-elected in 2020, the first time the constituency re-elected its MLA.

Chow was one of the few caucus members who did not formally endorse David Eby in the 2022 NDP leadership contest. In December 2022, Chow was demoted from cabinet by newly appointed Premier David Eby and served on the backbench for the first time. When asked about Chow's demotion, the Premier noted that Chow would take on "a leadership role" in addressing the homelessness crisis in Downtown Eastside and Chinatown instead.

In January 2024, Eby appointed Chow as Parliamentary Secretary for International Credentials, a non-cabinet position under the Minister of Post-Secondary Education and Future Skills Selina Robinson, with a mandate to expedite recognition of international credentials and workforce deployment of workers with such credentials. Prior to this appointment, the minister was assisted by a Minister of State.

On February 20, 2024, Chow returned to cabinet as the Minister of Citizens' Services, succeeding Lisa Beare. He was succeeded by Diana Gibson in July 2025.

=== Controversies during Tenure as Minister of State for Trade ===
Chow served as Minister of State for Trade between 2017 and 2022, under the minister responsible for economic development affairs Bruce Ralston, Michelle Mungall, and Ravi Kahlon. His tenure overlapped with a period of dramatic deterioration of Sino-Canadian relations, and Chow attracted numerous controversies for his perceived close relationship with Chinese Communist Party and its supporters.

In December 2018, a week after Huawei CFO Meng Wanzhou was arrested at Vancouver International Airport on behalf of the U.S, Chow took a personal trip to Guangdong and met with Chinese officials of the United Front Work Department, despite his reporting minister having cancelled another minister's participation of another trade mission that same week.

During the 2020 election, #NoBCforXi, a coalition of pro-Hong Kong, Uyghur and Tibetan human rights activists, deemed Chow to be “CCP leaning”.

A month after Meng was released, Chow appeared at an October 2021 event at Jack Poole Plaza hosted by organizations with direct links the United Front Work Department to celebrate the countdown to the 2022 Winter Olympics in Beijing and the Chinese National Day Golden Week. A spokesperson of the BC Government stated that Chow's appearance was not in his capacity as a government minister but as an MLA and member of the Chinese community, despite him being introduced as a minister during his appearance.

In December 2022, less than a week prior to his demotion from cabinet and in the wake of rare protests in China and Vancouver calling for Chinese President Xi Jinping’s resignation, Chow attended the BC-Guangdong Economic and Trade Summit, hosted by the Canada China Business Council, and sat beside the newly arrived Chinese Consul General to Vancouver at the head table.

== Electoral record ==
2024 British Columbia general election: Vancouver-Fraserview
| Party | Candidate | Votes | % | ±% | Expenditures |
|---|---|---|---|---|---|
| New Democratic | George Chow | 11,896 | 57.2% | +0.83 | |
| Conservative | Jag S. Sanghera | 7,618 | 36.6% | | |
| Green | Françoise Raunet | 1,291 | 6.2% | -2.86 | |
| Total valid votes | | 20,805 | – | | |
| Total rejected ballots | | | | | |
| Turnout | | | | | |
| Registered voters | | | | | |
Source: Elections BC

2020 British Columbia general election: Vancouver-Fraserview
| Party | Candidate | Votes | % | ±% | Expenditures |
|---|---|---|---|---|---|
| New Democratic | George Chow | 12,247 | 56.37 | +7.80 | $42,403.53 |
| Liberal | David Grewal | 7,511 | 34.57 | −7.65 | $64,241.50 |
| Green | Françoise Raunet | 1,969 | 9.06 | +1.34 | $243.99 |
| Total valid votes | | 21,727 | 100.00 | – | |
| Total rejected ballots | | 170 | 0.78 | −0.27 | |
| Turnout | | 21,897 | 50.22 | −10.33 | |
| Registered voters | | 43,602 | | | |
| New Democratic hold | | Swing | | +0.08 | |
Source: Elections BC

2017 British Columbia general election: Vancouver-Fraserview
| Party | Candidate | Votes | % | ±% | Expenditures |
|---|---|---|---|---|---|
| New Democratic | George Chow | 11,487 | 48.57 | +4.01 | $68,196 |
| Liberal | Suzanne Anton | 9,985 | 42.22 | -4.52 | $69,911 |
| Green | Eric Kolotyluk | 1,826 | 7.72 | +2.04 | $2,357 |
| Libertarian | Hiroshi Hyde | 179 | 0.76 | – | $56 |
| Your Political Party | Harpreet S. Bajwa | 174 | 0.73 | – | $8,399 |
| Total valid votes | | 23,651 | 100.00 | – | |
| Total rejected ballots | | 252 | 1.05 | -0.1 | |
| Turnout | | 23,903 | 60.55 | +5.59 | |
| Registered voters | | 39,479 | | | |
Source: Elections BC

2013 British Columbia general election: Vancouver-Langara
| Party | Candidate | Votes | % |
|---|---|---|---|
| Liberal | Moira Stilwell | 10,234 | 52.60 |
| New Democratic | George Chow | 7,447 | 38.28 |
| Green | Regan-Heng Zhang | 1,055 | 5.42 |
| Conservative | Gurjinder Bains | 674 | 3.46 |
| Platinum | Espavo Sozo | 45 | 0.23 |
| Total valid votes | | 19,455 | 100.00 |
| Total rejected ballots | | 172 | 0.88 |
| Turnout | | 19,627 | 50.52 |
Source: Elections BC

British Columbia provincial government of John Horgan
Cabinet posts (2)
| Predecessor | Office | Successor |
|---|---|---|
| Lisa Beare | Minister of Citizens' Services; February 20, 2024–Present | Incumbent |
| Teresa Wat | Minister of State for Trade; July 18, 2017–December 7, 2022 | Jagrup Brar |
