= Sophia Leung =

Canadian politician

Sophia Leung CM

Member of Parliament for Vancouver Kingsway
- In office June 2, 1997 – June 28, 2004
- Preceded by: Riding established
- Succeeded by: David Emerson

Personal details
- Born: July 25, 1933 (age 92) Wuxi, China
- Party: Liberal

Sophia Ming Ren Leung
- Traditional Chinese: 梁陳明任
- Simplified Chinese: 梁陈明任
Transcriptions
Standard Mandarin
- Hanyu Pinyin: Liáng Chén Míngrèn

Sophia Ming Ren Leung, CM (Chinese: 梁陳明任 born July 25, 1933) is a Canadian politician.

Born in Wuxi, China, she was a social worker before being elected to the House of Commons of Canada in 1997 for the riding of Vancouver Kingsway in British Columbia. A Liberal, she was re-elected in 2000. From 2000 to 2003, she was Parliamentary Secretary to the Minister of National Revenue. Both before and after her political career, she has been involved in a great deal of volunteer activities.

In 1994, she was made a Member of the Order of Canada.

Leung was considered for a Senate seat in 2004 and supported Sam Sullivan's bid of mayor of Vancouver.
