= Grace MacInnis =

Canadian politician

Grace MacInnis OC OBE
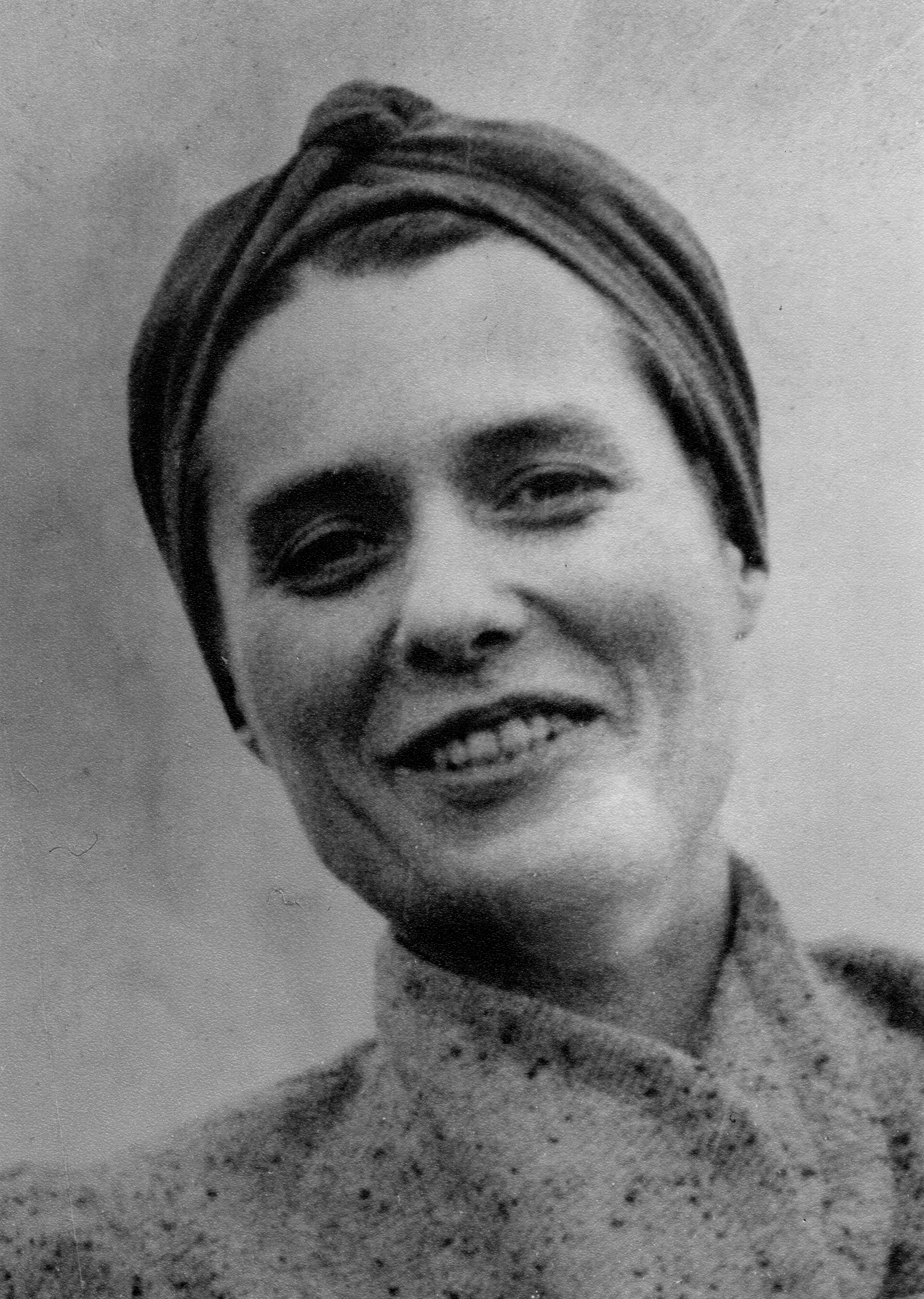

Member of the Canadian Parliament for Vancouver Kingsway
- In office November 8, 1965 – July 7, 1974
- Preceded by: Arnold Webster
- Succeeded by: Simma Holt

Member of the British Columbia Legislative Assembly for Vancouver-Burrard
- In office October 21, 1941 – October 24, 1945 Serving with Charles Grant MacNeil

Personal details
- Born: Winona Grace Woodsworth; July 25, 1905 Winnipeg, Manitoba, Canada
- Died: July 10, 1991 (aged 85) Sechelt, Sunshine Coast, British Columbia, Canada
- Party: Independent Labour; Co-operative Commonwealth Federation; New Democratic Party
- Spouse: Angus MacInnis
- Profession: Writer; teacher

Winona Grace MacInnis OC OBE (née Woodsworth; July 25, 1905 – July 10, 1991) was a Canadian socialist politician. She was the first woman from British Columbia elected to the House of Commons of Canada, as well as the first wife of a former Canadian Member of Parliament to be elected to the House of Commons in her own right, rather than by directly succeeding her husband in a by-election following his death.

The daughter of Co-operative Commonwealth Federation founding leader J. S. Woodsworth and the wife of long serving CCF MP Angus MacInnis, Grace MacInnis championed issues such as family planning, affordable housing, abortion rights and women's equality. She was a founding member of the CCF and served as an MLA in the Legislative Assembly of British Columbia from 1941 to 1945, on the executive of the national CCF, and in the Canadian House of Commons as a Member of Parliament representing the CCF's successor, the New Democratic Party from 1965 until her retirement in 1974.

MacInnis represented the British Columbia riding of Vancouver Kingsway. She was the only woman MP elected in the 1968 election.

In 1974, she was made an Officer of the Order of Canada "in recognition of a lifetime of service to Canada as teacher, author and parliamentarian". In 1979, she was a recipient of the Governor General's Award in Commemoration of the Persons Case. In 1990, she was awarded the Order of British Columbia.

== Personal life ==
MacInnis was born on July 25, 1905, in Winnipeg, Manitoba, Canada. She was the eldest among six children of J. S. Woodsworth, the first leader of Co-operative Commonwealth Federation (CCF, later the New Democratic Party), and Lucy Lillian Staples Woodsworth. Their lives and enthusiasm about politics highly influenced MacInnis' ideals as a politician, and a feminist. Her father was a minister of a comfortable Methodist parish. Her mother, Lucy, was a teacher and a loving mother to her children, also was known as a liberated thinker who taught her children about birth control, which was illegal at that time. The family had discussion frequently, which encouraged the children to express their thoughts freely. In the year of 1953, she published biography of her father: J.S. Woodsworth- A Man to Remember.

After attending the University of Manitoba and the Sorbonne, she became a teacher, but soon left her career to serve as an assistant to her father in 1931, and later acted as secretary of the CCF party. She married Angus MacInnis in January 1932 who spent 27 years as a CCF member of Vancouver-Kingsway in the House of Commons until his retirement in 1957 due to his failing health, which also confined MacInnis' activities as well. In 1941, she was elected to the British Columbia legislature as one of two members for the riding of Vancouver-Burrard and remained until her defeat in 1945. She was also defeated in the 1956 provincial election in the Vancouver Point-Grey riding. In the year of 1960, she suffered from rheumatoid arthritis which confined her activities completely. It took about 4 years for her to be quiescent. In 1964, her husband Angus MacInnis died. She rested and resumed her activities in NDP, and was elected as a Party Member of Vancouver-Kingsway in 1965. She held senior positions in both CCF Party and its successor, the NDP, and was president of the British Columbia Party for two terms, both on constituency and provincial levels. She received unanimous support from her party, and continued her activities for 35 years. MacInnis died on July 10, 1991.

== Career ==
During her career, MacInnis debated issues in the House of Commons concerning housing and abortion. In 1967, she was responsible for bringing the issue of housing to the government's attention, arguing that it was the main problem in Canada. This exchange led to the increase in interest rates of NHA loans from 7 1/4 % to 8 1/4%, which was advantageous, however, qualifying for the loans still remained difficult. She explained that Canadians couldn't qualify unless their income was at least $8,000 a year(the equivalent of $62,101.69 in 2020 dollars) and for those who could afford it, it was costly to carry a loan for an extended period. At the same meeting, MacInnis addressed abortion and how it is necessary for the option to be available for women if the child has a possibility of being born unhealthy, their physical or mental health was imperilled or the pregnancy was caused by rape. Her precautionary measures for abortion rights were that two registered physicians had to prescribe it for any of the previous reasons and she emphasized that anyone could apply. One of her reasons why these rights would be helpful was because they would reduce the amount of wrongly performed illegal abortions.

One problem that MacInnis recognized during her time in Parliament was that men don't usually engage in issues involving women. MacInnis advocated for those on lower incomes, in hopes of creating more opportunities for those who aren't able to create their own. She highlighted the importance of the ability for women to not have to choose between work and having children, and considered the need for more childcare centres so this could be made possible. In addition, she pressed for advancements towards training and education in order for all classes of women to qualify for better jobs.

== Legacy ==
MacInnis' papers (1.6 m) are held by the special collections division of the library of the University of British Columbia. They include the diaries, correspondence and speeches of her husband. The university also holds Angus Maclnnis Memorial Collection, the Angus Maclnnis Papers, and the Lillie d'Easum Collection, which include material by or about MacInnis. There is also a Grace MacInnis fonds (4.6 m) at Library and Archives Canada. Archival reference number is R5492.

== Election results ==
1941 British Columbia general election: Vancouver-Burrard
Party	Candidate	Votes	%	Elected
Co-operative Commonwealth	Charles Grant MacNeil	9,596	19.0	✓
Co-operative Commonwealth	Winona Grace MacInnis	9,402	18.6	✓
Conservative	Donald Cameron Brown	8,283	16.4	
Conservative	George Clark Miller	8,281	16.4	
Liberal	John Howard Forester	7,505	14.8	
Liberal	Helen Douglas Smith	7,276	14.4	
Socialist Labor	John Alexander Fedoruk	267	0.5	
Total valid votes		50,610	100.00	
Total rejected ballots		268	1.2	
Turnout		26,511	70.4	

1945 British Columbia general election: Vancouver-Burrard
Party	Candidate	Votes	%	Elected
Coalition	George Moir Weir	14,938	57.65	✓
Coalition	Donald Cameron Brown	14,711	56.78	✓
Co-operative Commonwealth	Winona Grace MacInnis	10,150	39.17	
Co-operative Commonwealth	Charles Grant MacNeil	10,071	38.87	
Labour Progressive	Joan Mason	1,042	4.02	
Labour Progressive	Sidney Zlotnik	988	3.81	
Social Credit	Peer Paynter	668	2.58	
Social Credit	James W. Wardrop	551	2.13	
Socialist Labor	John Fedoruk	107	0.41	
Total valid votes		25,910	100.00	
Total rejected ballots		205		
Turnout		52.6		

1965 Canadian federal election: Vancouver Kingsway
Party	Candidate	Votes	%	±%
New Democratic	Grace MacInnis	13,730	49.08	+1.84
Liberal	Jack Austin	7,994	28.57	+1.00
Social Credit	Arthur Holmes	4,012	14.34	+3.70
Progressive Conservative	Garfield Milner	2,240	8.01	−6.54
Total valid votes		27,976	100.0	
New Democratic hold		Swing		+0.42

1968 Canadian federal election: Vancouver Kingsway
Party	Candidate	Votes	%	±%
New Democratic	Grace MacInnis	15,599	49.55	+0.48
Liberal	Edward Bodnarchuk	10,835	34.42	+5.85
Progressive Conservative	Claude Britton	3,285	10.44	+2.43
Social Credit	Lorena T. Green	1,760	5.59	−8.75
Total valid votes		31,479	100.0	
New Democratic hold		Swing		−2.68

1972 Canadian federal election: Vancouver Kingsway
Party	Candidate	Votes	%	±%
New Democratic	Grace MacInnis	18,108	56.81	+7.26
Progressive Conservative	John A. Cherrington	6,752	21.18	+10.75
Liberal	Ed Bodnarchuk	5,986	18.78	−15.64
Social Credit	Faren Garner	750	2.35	−3.24
Independent	William John Turner	211	0.66	–
Independent	Claire Alston	66	0.21	–
Total valid votes		31,873	100.0	
New Democratic hold		Swing		−1.74
