= Simma Holt =

Canadian politician (1922–2015)

Member of the Canadian Parliament for Vancouver Kingsway
- In office 1974–1979
- Preceded by: Grace MacInnis
- Succeeded by: Ian Waddell

Personal details
- Born: Simma Milner; March 27, 1922 Vegreville, Alberta
- Died: January 23, 2015 (aged 92) Burnaby, British Columbia
- Party: Liberal
- Spouse: Leon Holt (died: 1985)
- Education: University of Manitoba
- Occupation: journalist

Simma Holt CM (née Milner, March 27, 1922 – January 23, 2015) was a Canadian journalist, author, and the first Jewish woman elected to the House of Commons of Canada. Before entering politics, she had a 30-year career at The Vancouver Sun newspaper as a reporter, feature writer, and columnist.

== Early life and education ==
Born in Vegreville, Alberta as Simma Milner, the sixth of eight children, Holt received a Bachelor of Arts degree, with majors in English and psychology, in 1944 from the University of Manitoba.

== Journalism ==
Her interest in journalism began as a child when the sole operator of the Vegriville Observer would welcome her observing his production of the paper. Partly due to male students at the University of Manitoba participating in the Second World War, Holt became the first female managing editor of the student newspaper The Manitoban and university correspondent for the Winnipeg Free Press. On D-Day, her first day using the machine, Holt mistakenly clogged up the teletype machine at the Canadian Press in Calgary.

A few months later, she started her career at The Vancouver Sun. At the start of Holt's journalism career, women were rarely employed as professional journalists. She gained a reputation as a tough reporter by working in traditionally-male beats such as crime and waterfront reporting. Holt's style was seen as tough advocacy or crusading investigative journalism in potentially-controversial topics such as prostitution. Sexism incidents included coworkers handing her photos of nude women and being told by her editor she would be fired if she again snuck into the male-only Terminal Club to cover a story.

During a 1970 strike by Sun employees, Holt was a labour negotiator and vice-president of the Newspaper Guild and actively worked for the Vancouver Express. In 1996, Holt was also inducted into the Canadian News Hall of Fame — the first female journalist in B.C. to receive the distinction.

== Politics ==
British Columbia Senator Ray Perrault engaged Holt with Liberal leader Pierre Elliott Trudeau. Initially, she was critical of Trudeau and had written a story about his wife but became favourable to him after he was willing to accept her criticism. In the 1974 election, Holt was elected to the Canadian House of Commons as the Liberal candidate for the British Columbia riding of Vancouver Kingsway. She was one of only two women representing British Columbia. She was defeated in the 1979 election and the 1980 election. She did not enjoy her leave of absence from journalism to sit in Parliament and face anti-Semitism and anti-feminism. She called Parliament a 'silly old boys' club' and a waste of time.

Holt moved to Maple Falls, Washington, and temporarily worked for the campaign for U.S. President George H. W. Bush.

In 1981, Holt started a three-year term as a member of the National Parole Board.

In 2006, she publicly criticized Vancouver Mayor Sam Sullivan for seeking a court order to remove lengthy protests by Falun Gong from outside the embassy of China on Granville Street.

== Recognition ==
In 1996, Holt was made a Member of the Order of Canada for her "lifetime commitment to assisting those suffering from injustice, persecution and poverty".

== Personal life ==
In 1949, she married Leon Holt. They remained together but childless until his death in 1985.

After purchasing what turned out to be one of Vancouver's notorious "leaky condos" in 1999, Holt waged a publicly vocal, seven-year legal action seeking financial compensation for repairs.

After 2010, she lived her final years in the Seton Villa Seniors' Centre in Burnaby. She died at the age of 92 in January 2015.

== Selected bibliography ==
- Terror in the Name of God: The Story of the Sons of Freedom (1964) — Mistakenly reports that Sons of Freedom are Doukhobors.
- Sex and the Teen Age Revolution (1967)
- The Devil's Butler (1972) — Drugs, hippies and murders by Satan's Angels Motorcycle Club.
- The Other Mrs. Diefenbaker (1982) — Biography on Edna Diefenbaker.
- Memoirs of a Loose Cannon (2008) — Personal memoirs.
