= Ken Johnston (British Columbia politician) =

Canadian politician

Richmond City Councillor
- In office December 1, 2008 – November 5, 2018
- In office December 6, 1993 – June 15, 2001

Member of the British Columbia Legislative Assembly for Vancouver-Fraserview
- In office May 16, 2001 – May 17, 2005
- Preceded by: Ian Waddell
- Succeeded by: Wally Oppal

Personal details
- Born: 1950 (age 75–76) Vancouver, British Columbia
- Party: Richmond Community Coalition; BC Liberal
- Other political affiliations: Richmond First (2008-2014)
- Spouse: Diane Johnston (m. 1972)
- Occupation: accountant, banker

Ken Johnston (born 1950) is a politician in British Columbia, Canada. He is a former member of the Richmond City Council, serving from 1993 to 2001, and 2008 to 2018. He previously represented the Vancouver-Fraserview riding in the Legislative Assembly of British Columbia from 2001 to 2005 as a member of the British Columbia Liberal Party.

== Biography ==
Born in Vancouver, Johnston grew up in the neighbourhood of Fraserview and graduated from Killarney Secondary School in 1968. He attended the University of British Columbia, and earned his Certified General Accountant designation in 1976; he subsequently worked as a public practice accountant before moving into private business in 1980. He became a director of Richmond Savings Credit Union in 1986, and he served as board chair from 1995 to 1998. After Richmond Savings was merged into Coast Capital Savings, Johnston also served on the board of that institution. He was also president of Richmond-based transportation company Novex Delivery Solutions.

A resident of Richmond since 1976, Johnston first became a Richmond city councillor in 1993, and was re-elected in 1996 and 1999. In the 2001 provincial election, he ran as a BC Liberal candidate in Vancouver-Fraserview, and defeated the incumbent New Democratic Party candidate Ian Waddell by 4,546 votes to become the riding's member of the legislative assembly (MLA). During his term in the BC legislature, he served as a member of the Government Caucus Committee on Government Operations, as well as various legislative standing committees, including the Health and Crown Corporations committees.

He was replaced as the Liberal candidate in Vancouver-Fraserview for the 2005 provincial election by Wally Oppal, who was recruited by party leader Gordon Campbell to run in the riding. After finishing his term as MLA, he ran in the 2008 municipal election as part of Richmond First, and returned to Richmond City Council. He was re-elected councillor in 2011 as a Richmond First candidate, then in 2014 as part of the Richmond Community Coalition; he lost re-election in 2018 by finishing in 12th place.

He married his wife Diane in 1972; they have two children together.
