= Angus MacInnis =

Canadian politician (1884-1964)

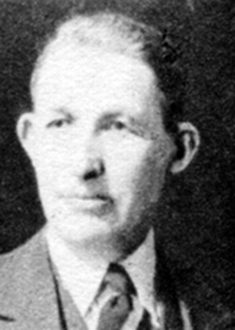

Member of Parliament for Vancouver Kingsway
- In office 1953–1957
- Preceded by: Riding established
- Succeeded by: Alexander Macdonald

Member of Parliament for Vancouver East
- In office 1935–1953
- Preceded by: Riding established
- Succeeded by: Harold Edward Winch

Member of Parliament for Vancouver South
- In office 1930–1935
- Preceded by: Leon Johnson Ladner
- Succeeded by: Howard Charles Green

Personal details
- Born: September 2, 1884 Glen William, Prince Edward Island, Canada
- Died: March 3, 1964 (aged 79) Vancouver, British Columbia, Canada
- Party: Independent Labour; Co-operative Commonwealth Federation
- Spouse: Grace MacInnis
- Profession: Trade unionist

Angus MacInnis (September 2, 1884 – March 3, 1964) was a Canadian socialist politician and parliamentarian.

MacInnis, a trade unionist who had first served for five years as a Vancouver Alderman, was then elected to the House of Commons of Canada in the 1930 election as an Independent Labour Member of Parliament. He joined the Ginger Group of socialist MPs led by J.S. Woodsworth. He helped form the Co-operative Commonwealth Federation (CCF) in 1932 and thereafter sat as a CCF MP.

MacInnis retained his status as an MP through five subsequent elections until his retirement in 1957, but sat in three different ridings. From 1930 to 1935 he represented Vancouver South. From 1935 to 1953, he was elected three times in Vancouver East. He finished his political career as MP from Vancouver Kingsway. He was an outspoken advocate of civil liberties and spoke against the discrimination against Japanese Canadians that was widespread in British Columbia in the 1930s and 1940s, and was an early advocate of extending the right to vote to Japanese Canadians, a right that was not won until 1949.

In 1943, he and his wife Grace MacInnis published Oriental Canadians—Outcasts or Citizens? which, while a call for humane treatment of Japanese-Canadians, acquiesced to the prevailing mood at the time that favoured "evacuating" Japanese Canadians from the Pacific coast of British Columbia for reasons of wartime security.

When F. R. Scott stepped-down as the National Chairman, just before the CCF's biennial convention in Vancouver in July 1950, there was a rift between the farmer and labour wings. Percy Wright a Saskatchewan farmer and Member of Parliament, represented the farmer-wing, while MacInnis, represented the labour-wing. Wright defeated MacInnis in the election to be the CCF's National Chairman.

== See also ==
- Labour Party (Canada)
