= Bernie Simpson =

Canadian politician

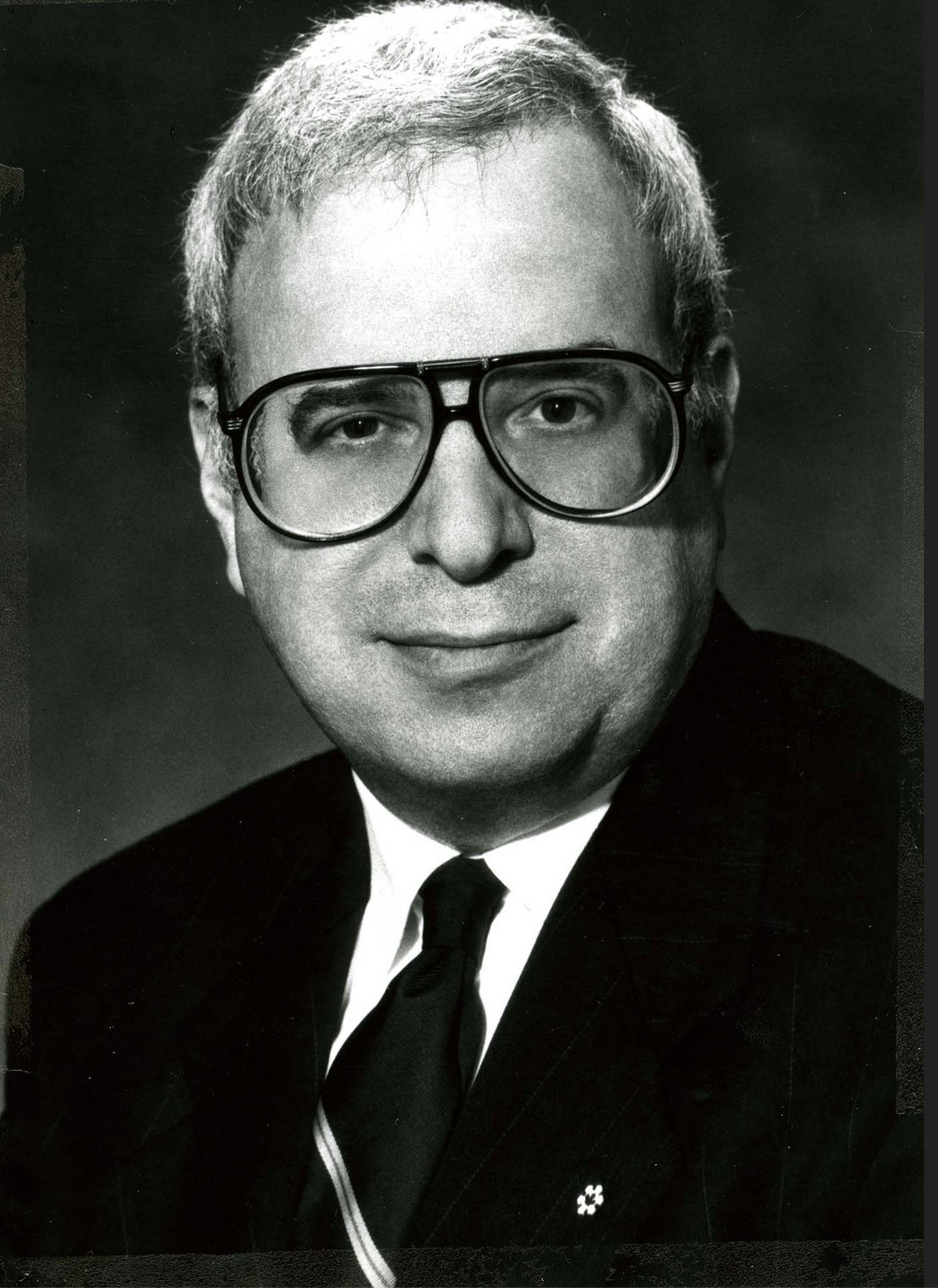

MLA for Vancouver-Fraserview
- In office 1991–1996

Personal details
- Born: May 31, 1942 (age 83) Vancouver, British Columbia, Canada
- Party: British Columbia New Democratic Party
- Occupation: lawyer

Bernie Simpson (born May 31, 1942) is a former Canadian politician, who served in the Legislative Assembly of British Columbia from 1991 to 1996 as a NDP member for the constituency of Vancouver-Fraserview. He did not seek a second term in the 1996 provincial election. In 2001, Bernie formed a partnership with a well-known personal injury lawyer, Anthony Thomas, and the firm became Simpson, Thomas & Associates.

== Early career ==
In 1991, Simpson was elected to the British Columbia Legislature for the Constituency of Vancouver-Fraserview. During his term as a Provincial Member of the Legislature, he set out to ensure that Bike Helmet Legislation, was enacted into law. This would be the most progressive Bike Helmet Legislation in Canada. The persistence of enacting that Legislation was influenced by a case that he worked on before being elected where a young girl suffered a serious brain injury while riding her bicycle in Surrey without wearing a bike helmet. In order to ensure that the victims of car accidents have the best possible rehabilitation, Bernie has traveled to many parts of the world to set up rehabilitation programs.
