= Vancouver Kingsway =

Federal electoral district in British Columbia, Canada

Coordinates: 49.248°N 123.075°W

British Columbia electoral district
- Interactive map of riding boundaries from the 2025 federal election

Federal electoral district
- Legislature: House of Commons
MP
Don Davies
New Democratic
- District created: 1996
- First contested: 1997
- Last contested: 2025
- District webpage: profile, map

Demographics
- Population (2021): 108,054
- Electors (2015): 69,812
- Area (km²): 15.3
- Pop. density (per km²): 7,062.4
- Census division: Metro Vancouver
- Census subdivision: Vancouver (part)

Vancouver Kingsway is a federal electoral district in British Columbia, Canada, that has been represented in the House of Commons of Canada from 1953 to 1988 and since 1997. It is located in Vancouver.

== Demographics ==
This riding's population is over 54 percent immigrants. The three largest pan-ethnic groups include East Asians (35.5 percent), Europeans (27.6 percent) and Southeast Asians (19.4 percent). The service sector, retail trade and manufacturing are the major sources of employment in Vancouver Kingsway. The average family income is over $72,000. Unemployment is around 6.5 percent.

9.9 percent of the population is Buddhist, the highest in Canada. More generally, Vancouver Kingsway has the highest proportion of non-Christians, 62.8 percent in particular, of which: no religious affiliation: 43.5 percent, Buddhist: 9.9 percent, Sikh: 3.2 percent etc.

Panethnic groups in Vancouver Kingsway (2011−2021)
Panethnic group	2021		2016		2011	
Panethnic group	Pop.	%	Pop.	%	Pop.	%
East Asian (Note: Statistic includes total responses of "Chinese", "Korean", and "Japanese" under visible minority section on census.)	38,035	35.53%	39,675	38.24%	40,580	39.98%
European (Note: Statistic includes all persons that did not make up part of a visible minority or an indigenous identity.)	29,530	27.58%	29,545	28.47%	27,845	27.43%
Southeast Asian (Note: Statistic includes total responses of "Filipino" and "Southeast Asian" under visible minority section on census.)	20,770	19.4%	19,545	18.84%	19,420	19.13%
South Asian	7,810	7.29%	7,085	6.83%	6,955	6.85%
Latin American	2,885	2.69%	1,525	1.47%	1,370	1.35%
Indigenous	1,855	1.73%	1,890	1.82%	1,460	1.44%
African	1,405	1.31%	915	0.88%	855	0.84%
Middle Eastern (Note: Statistic includes total responses of "West Asian" and "Arab" under visible minority section on census.)	1,065	0.99%	625	0.6%	510	0.5%
Other (Note: Statistic includes total responses of "Visible minority, n.i.e." and "Multiple visible minorities" under visible minority section on census.)	3,705	3.46%	2,965	2.86%	2,505	2.47%
Total responses	107,065	99.08%	103,760	98.94%	101,495	99.5%
Total population	108,054	100%	104,870	100%	102,003	100%
Note: Totals greater than 100% due to multiple origin responses. Demographics based on the 2012 Canadian federal electoral redistribution riding boundaries.

== History ==
The name "Vancouver Kingsway" has been used twice to describe federal ridings. It was first created in 1952, carved out of Vancouver South riding. In 1987, the riding was divided between Burnaby—Kingsway, Vancouver East, Vancouver Quadra and Vancouver South ridings. In 1996, a new Vancouver Kingsway was created out of these same four ridings.

This riding has been held by the NDP and its precursor CCF for most of its history. The NDP (along with the CCF) has won 15 of the 21 elections held since the riding was formed in 1953, the Liberals have won five, and the Conservatives, one. The two candidates who topped the poll in the 2008 election ran again in 2011. The incumbent member of Parliament, Vancouver lawyer Don Davies, represented the NDP, and Vancouver businesswoman Wendy Yuan represented the Liberal Party again. Davies won by approximately 3,000 votes in 2008. In 2011, Davies quintupled that margin, topping the Liberal candidate by over 15,000 votes, the Conservative candidate by over 10,000 votes, and winning over 50 percent of the votes cast.

The 2012 federal electoral boundaries redistribution concluded that the electoral boundaries of Vancouver Kingsway should be adjusted, and a modified electoral district of the same name was created. The redefined Vancouver Kingsway lost its territory west of Main Street to the new district of Vancouver Granville, as well as a small area in its extreme southeast to Vancouver South. These new boundaries were legally defined in the 2013 representation order, which came into effect upon the call of the 2015 election.

=== Historical boundaries ===
1952 representation order

1966 representation order

1976 representation order

1987 representation order (as Burnaby—Kingsway)

1996 representation order

2003 representation order

2013 representation order

2023 representation order

=== David Emerson controversy ===
David Emerson was first elected in 2004, for the Liberal Party of Canada, and served in the Cabinet led by Prime Minister Paul Martin as the Minister of Industry.

Emerson was re-elected as a Liberal in the 2006 election, but crossed the floor two weeks later on February 6, 2006, to become the new Minister of International Trade in Stephen Harper's Conservative government.

Emerson's floor-crossing was highly controversial. Then Prime Minister-designate Stephen Harper dispatched campaign co-chair John Douglas Reynolds, on the day after the election, to offer Emerson a cabinet post in a Conservative government. Emerson's acceptance of that offer made Canadian history, marking the first time a member of parliament, let alone a cabinet minister, had crossed the floor before a new government was even sworn in.

As a result of the controversy, a number of groups formed to fight for Emerson's resignation. Some groups also seek legislation that would prevent floor crossing altogether or restrict a member of parliament if they abandon their party's caucus. Groups that fought against Emerson's defection included the Recall David Emerson campaign, which was aligned with the New Democratic Party, and the De-Elect Emerson campaign, which began under Liberal alignment but which eventually outgrew the influence of that party and became entirely citizen-powered.

Emerson chose not to seek re-election in 2008.

== Members of Parliament ==
This riding has elected the following members of Parliament:

Parliament	Years	Member	Party
Vancouver Kingsway; Riding created from Vancouver South
22nd	1953–1957	Angus MacInnis	Co-operative Commonwealth
23rd	1957–1958	Alexander Macdonald	Co-operative Commonwealth
24th	1958–1962	John Ferguson Browne	Progressive Conservative
25th	1962–1963	Arnold Webster	New Democratic
26th	1963–1965	Arnold Webster	New Democratic
27th	1965–1968	Grace MacInnis	New Democratic
28th	1968–1972	Grace MacInnis	New Democratic
29th	1972–1974	Grace MacInnis	New Democratic
30th	1974–1979	Simma Holt	Liberal
31st	1979–1980	Ian Waddell	New Democratic
32nd	1980–1984	Ian Waddell	New Democratic
33rd	1984–1988	Ian Waddell	New Democratic
Riding dissolved into Burnaby—Kingsway, Vancouver East, Vancouver Quadra and Vancouver South
Riding re-created from Burnaby—Kingsway, Vancouver East, Vancouver Quadra and Vancouver South
36th	1997–2000	Sophia Leung	Liberal
37th	2000–2004	Sophia Leung	Liberal
38th	2004–2006	David Emerson	Liberal
39th	2006–2006	David Emerson	Liberal
39th	2006–2008	David Emerson	Conservative
40th	2008–2011	Don Davies	New Democratic
41st	2011–2015	Don Davies	New Democratic
42nd	2015–2019	Don Davies	New Democratic
43rd	2019–2021	Don Davies	New Democratic
44th	2021–2025	Don Davies	New Democratic
45th	2025–present	Don Davies	New Democratic

== Election results ==
=== 1997–present ===
View chart definition.
Graph of election results in Vancouver Kingsway (since 1997, minor parties that never received 2% or more of the vote or that did not run candidates consistently are omitted)

2025 Canadian federal election
Party	Candidate	Votes	%	±%	Expenditures
New Democratic	Don Davies	18,788	37.24	–13.16	$116,136.09
Liberal	Amy K. Gill	18,485	36.64	+7.62	$96,281.50
Conservative	Ravinder Bhatia	12,352	24.49	+10.35	$44,122.30
Green	Imtiaz Popat	499	0.99	–2.64	none listed
People's	Fiona Wang	322	0.64	–1.56	none listed
Total valid votes/expense limit		50,446	99.35	–	$127,774.38
Total rejected ballots		332	0.65	–0.15	
Turnout		50,778	62.99	+9.06	
Eligible voters		80,608			
New Democratic notional hold		Swing		–10.38	
Source: Elections Canada

2021 federal election redistributed results
Party	Vote	%
New Democratic	21,868	50.40
Liberal	12,591	29.02
Conservative	6,136	14.14
Green	1,575	3.63
People's	956	2.20
Others	261	0.60

2021 Canadian federal election
Party	Candidate	Votes	%	±%	Expenditures
New Democratic	Don Davies	20,994	52.28	+3.19	$99,674.26
Liberal	Virginia Bremner	11,022	27.45	+4.36	$47,586.74
Conservative	Carson Binda	5,456	13.59	–6.35	$7,752.14
Green	Farrukh A. Chishtie	1,575	3.92	–2.14	$2,013.80
People's	Jeremy MacKenzie	868	2.16	+1.19	$247.30
Communist	Kimball Cariou	175	0.44	–0.23	none listed
Marxist–Leninist	Donna Petersen	68	0.17	–0.04	none listed
Total valid votes/expense limit		40,158	99.20	–	$108,601.94
Total rejected ballots		324	0.80	–0.20	
Turnout		40,482	53.93	–4.73	
Eligible voters		75,060			
New Democratic hold		Swing		–0.59	
Source: Elections Canada

2019 Canadian federal election
Party	Candidate	Votes	%	±%	Expenditures
New Democratic	Don Davies	21,680	49.09	+3.35	$100,998.49
Liberal	Tamara Taggart	10,194	23.08	–4.73	$99,083.54
Conservative	Helen Quan	8,804	19.94	–1.08	$39,178.78
Green	Lawrence Taylor	2,675	6.06	+2.81	$2,197.44
People's	Ian Torn	427	0.97	–	$3,869.88
Communist	Kimball Cariou	292	0.66	–0.32	$640.69
Marxist–Leninist	Donna Petersen	91	0.21	+0.03	none listed
Total valid votes/expense limit		44,163	99.00	–	$105,475.06
Total rejected ballots		446	1.00	–0.03	
Turnout		44,609	58.67	–4.65	
Eligible voters		76,039			
New Democratic hold		Swing		+4.04	
Source: Elections Canada

2015 Canadian federal election
Party	Candidate	Votes	%	±%	Expenditures
New Democratic	Don Davies	20,763	45.74	–5.53	$113,476.84
Liberal	Steven Kou	12,625	27.81	+11.64	$82,210.90
Conservative	Jojo Quimpo	9,538	21.01	–7.09	$51,416.77
Green	Catherine Moore	1,476	3.25	–0.28	$1,663.13
Libertarian	Matt Kadioglu	468	1.03	+0.44	none listed
Communist	Kimball Cariou	445	0.98	+0.53	none listed
Marxist–Leninist	Donna Petersen	81	0.18	+0.01	none listed
Total valid votes/expense limit		45,396	98.97	–	$204,392.06
Total rejected ballots		471	1.03	+0.36	
Turnout		45,867	63.32	+6.26	
Eligible voters		72,438			
New Democratic hold		Swing		–8.58	
Source: Elections Canada

2011 federal election redistributed results
Party	Vote	%
New Democratic	18,752	51.27
Conservative	10,177	27.82
Liberal	5,916	16.17
Green	1,292	3.53
Others	441	1.21

2011 Canadian federal election
Party	Candidate	Votes	%	±%	Expenditures
New Democratic	Don Davies	23,452	50.08	+14.91	$76,686.19
Conservative	Trang Nguyen	13,157	28.10	+0.68	$83,075.98
Liberal	Wendy Yuan	7,796	16.65	–12.41	$83,368.33
Green	Louise Boutin	1,860	3.97	–2.72	$276.79
Libertarian	Matt Kadioglu	275	0.59	–0.09	none listed
Communist	Kimball Cariou	210	0.45	–0.19	$306.08
Marxist–Leninist	Donna Petersen	78	0.17	–0.16	none listed
Total valid votes/expense limit		46,828	99.33	–	$88,454.41
Total rejected ballots		315	0.67	–0.05	
Turnout		47,143	57.06	+0.61	
Eligible voters		82,619			
New Democratic hold		Swing		+7.10	
Source: Elections Canada

2008 Canadian federal election
Party	Candidate	Votes	%	±%	Expenditures
New Democratic	Don Davies	15,933	35.18	+1.67	$80,613.12
Liberal	Wendy Yuan	13,164	29.06	–14.39	$74,285.88
Conservative	Salomon Rayek	12,419	27.42	+8.62	$65,417.06
Green	Doug Warkentin	3,031	6.69	+3.86	$3,478.12
Libertarian	Matt Kadioglu	309	0.68	+0.08	none listed
Communist	Kimball Cariou	291	0.64	+0.29	$391.12
Marxist–Leninist	Donna Petersen	149	0.33	+0.18	none listed
Total valid votes/expense limit		45,296	99.28	–	$84,757.87
Total rejected ballots		328	0.72	+0.13	
Turnout		45,624	56.45	–2.29	
Eligible voters		80,817			
New Democratic gain from Liberal		Swing		+8.03	
Source: Elections Canada

2006 Canadian federal election
Party	Candidate	Votes	%	±%	Expenditures
Liberal	David Emerson	20,062	43.45	+3.01	$72,376.35
New Democratic	Ian Waddell	15,470	33.51	–3.77	$56,932.14
Conservative	Kan Wong	8,679	18.80	+2.32	$46,990.20
Green	Arno Schortinghuis	1,307	2.83	–0.73	$671.37
Libertarian	Matt Kadioglu	277	0.60	–	none listed
Communist	Kimball Cariou	162	0.35	–0.05	$297.06
Canadian Action	Connie Fogal	143	0.31	–0.02	$2,986.80
Marxist–Leninist	Donna Petersen	68	0.15	–0.07	none listed
Total valid votes/expense limit		46,168	99.41	–	$79,206.36
Total rejected ballots		274	0.59	–0.33	
Turnout		46,442	58.74	+0.74	
Eligible voters		79,058			
Liberal hold		Swing		+3.39	
Source: Elections Canada

2004 Canadian federal election
Party	Candidate	Votes	%	±%	Expenditures
Liberal	David Emerson	17,267	40.44	–2.63	$60,912.54
New Democratic	Ian Waddell	15,916	37.28	+21.36	$55,150.12
Conservative	Jesse Johl	7,037	16.48	–17.94	$64,937.59
Green	Tracey Jastinder Mann	1,521	3.56	+0.87	$5,052.41
Independent	Jeannie Kwan	548	1.28	–	$6,229.81
Communist	Jason Mann	172	0.40	–0.05	$389.85
Canadian Action	Jacob Rempel	142	0.33	–2.87	$373.66
Marxist–Leninist	Donna Petersen	94	0.22	–0.12	$150.00
Total valid votes/expense limit		42,697	99.08	–	$74,633.04
Total rejected ballots		395	0.92	+0.08	
Turnout		43,092	58.01	+2.03	
Eligible voters		74,286			
Liberal hold		Swing		–12.00	
Change is based on redistributed results from 2000. Conservative change is from the total of the Canadian Alliance and Progressive Conservative votes.
Source: Elections Canada

2000 Canadian federal election
Party	Candidate	Votes	%	±%	Expenditures
Liberal	Sophia Leung	16,118	43.07	+2.45	$56,204
Alliance	Alice Wong	11,076	29.60	+11.23	$39,286
New Democratic	Victor Wong	5,921	15.82	–14.72	$7,654
Progressive Conservative	Kan Wong	1,803	4.82	+0.85	$11,072
Canadian Action	Connie Fogal	1,200	3.21	–	$54,962
Green	Phillip Petrik	1,009	2.70	+0.37	$134
Communist	Elwyn Patterson	168	0.45	–	$189
Marxist–Leninist	Donna Petersen	126	0.34	–0.12	$22
Total valid votes		37,421	99.16		
Total rejected ballots		316	0.84	–0.37	
Turnout		37,737	55.98	–7.39	
Eligible voters		67,413			
Liberal hold		Swing		–4.39	
Change for the Canadian Alliance is based on the Reform Party.
Source: Elections Canada

1997 Canadian federal election
Party	Candidate	Votes	%	±%	Expenditures
Liberal	Sophia Leung	14,182	40.62	–	$48,495
New Democratic	Victor Wong	10,662	30.54	–	$52,412
Reform	Raymond Leung	6,412	18.37	–	$15,532
Progressive Conservative	Kan Wong	1,385	3.97	–	$4,577
Independent	Gim Huey	894	2.56	–	$23,368
Green	Irene Louise Schmidt	811	2.32	–	none listed
Natural Law	Steven R. Beck	210	0.60	–	none listed
Marxist–Leninist	Donna Petersen	161	0.46	–	$699
Independent	Roger Annis	116	0.33	–	none listed
Independent	David Tsai	78	0.22	–	$2,450
Total valid votes		34,911	98.79		
Total rejected ballots		426	1.21	+0.58	
Turnout		35,337	63.37	–12.21	
Eligible voters		55,760			
This riding was re-created from parts of Burnaby—Kingsway, Vancouver East, Vancouver Quadra and Vancouver South, which elected three Liberals and one New Democrat (Burnaby—Kingsway) in the previous election.
Source: Elections Canada

=== 1953–1988 ===
Graph of election results in Vancouver Kingsway (1953–1984, minor parties that never got 2% of the vote or didn't run consistently are omitted)

1984 Canadian federal election
Party	Candidate	Votes	%	±%
New Democratic	Ian Waddell	20,179	51.10	+4.25
Liberal	Nancy Morrison	11,640	29.48	–0.84
Progressive Conservative	Collin Wong	7,152	18.11	–3.82
Green	Ted Mousseau	305	0.77	–
Communist	Bert Ogden	214	0.54	+0.13
Total valid votes		39,490	99.37	
Total rejected ballots		250	0.63	+0.19
Turnout		39,740	75.59	+5.15
Eligible voters		52,576		
New Democratic hold		Swing		+2.54
Source: Elections Canada

1980 Canadian federal election
Party	Candidate	Votes	%	±%
New Democratic	Ian Waddell	16,928	46.85	+2.09
Liberal	Simma Holt	10,954	30.32	–2.01
Progressive Conservative	Drew Taylor	7,924	21.93	–0.27
Communist	Bert Ogden	149	0.41	+0.00
Independent	Norm Baker	113	0.31	–
Marxist–Leninist	Leanne Corcoran	63	0.17	–0.12
Total valid votes		36,131	99.56	
Total rejected ballots		158	0.44	+0.26
Turnout		36,289	70.43	–2.87
Eligible voters		51,524		
New Democratic hold		Swing		+2.05
Source: Elections Canada

1979 Canadian federal election
Party	Candidate	Votes	%	±%
New Democratic	Ian Waddell	15,928	44.76	+11.71
Liberal	Simma Holt	11,503	32.33	–5.05
Progressive Conservative	Cal Davis	7,900	22.20	–6.31
Communist	Jack Phillips	147	0.41	–0.29
Marxist–Leninist	Tarlochan S. Bains	106	0.30	–0.06
Total valid votes		35,584	99.82	
Total rejected ballots		64	0.18	–0.31
Turnout		35,648	73.30	+3.64
Eligible voters		48,635		
New Democratic gain from Liberal		Swing		+8.38
Source: Elections Canada

1974 Canadian federal election
Party	Candidate	Votes	%	±%
Liberal	Simma Holt	12,002	37.38	+18.60
New Democratic	Dennis F. Mulroney	10,614	33.06	–23.76
Progressive Conservative	John Russell Taylor	9,155	28.51	+7.33
Communist	Fred Wilson	225	0.70	–
Marxist–Leninist	Thomas J. Boylan	114	0.36	–
Total valid votes		32,110	99.51	
Total rejected ballots		158	0.49	–3.33
Turnout		32,268	69.66	–1.00
Eligible voters		46,322		
Liberal gain from New Democratic		Swing		+21.18
Source: Library of Parliament

1972 Canadian federal election
Party	Candidate	Votes	%	±%
New Democratic	Grace MacInnis	18,108	56.81	+7.26
Progressive Conservative	John A. Cherrington	6,752	21.18	+10.75
Liberal	Edward Bodnarchuk	5,986	18.78	–15.64
Social Credit	Faren Garner	750	2.35	–3.24
Independent	William John Turner	211	0.66	–
Independent	Claire Alston	66	0.21	–
Total valid votes		31,873	96.18	
Total rejected ballots		1,267	3.82	+2.97
Turnout		33,140	70.66	–1.80
Eligible voters		46,901		
New Democratic hold		Swing		−1.74
Source: Library of Parliament

1968 Canadian federal election
Party	Candidate	Votes	%	±%
New Democratic	Grace MacInnis	15,599	49.55	+0.48
Liberal	Edward Bodnarchuk	10,835	34.42	+5.85
Progressive Conservative	Claude Britton	3,285	10.44	+2.43
Social Credit	Lorena T. Green	1,760	5.59	–8.75
Total valid votes		31,479	99.15	
Total rejected ballots		270	0.85	–0.10
Turnout		31,749	72.46	–1.44
Eligible voters		43,818		
New Democratic hold		Swing		−2.68
Source: Library of Parliament

1965 Canadian federal election
Party	Candidate	Votes	%	±%
New Democratic	Grace MacInnis	13,730	49.08	+1.84
Liberal	Jack Austin	7,994	28.57	+1.00
Social Credit	Arthur Holmes	4,012	14.34	+3.70
Progressive Conservative	Garfield Milner	2,240	8.01	–6.54
Total valid votes		27,976	99.05	
Total rejected ballots		269	0.95	+0.26
Turnout		28,245	73.89	–4.75
Eligible voters		38,224		
New Democratic hold		Swing		+0.42
Source: Library of Parliament

1963 Canadian federal election
Party	Candidate	Votes	%	±%
New Democratic	Arnold Webster	13,966	47.24	–0.87
Liberal	Douglas A. Walker	8,154	27.58	+5.45
Progressive Conservative	Gerald E. Klein	4,301	14.55	–4.65
Social Credit	Arthur Holmes	3,145	10.64	+0.07
Total valid votes		29,566	99.31	
Total rejected ballots		206	0.69	–0.27
Turnout		29,772	78.64	+1.38
Eligible voters		37,858		
New Democratic hold		Swing		–3.16
Source: Library of Parliament

1962 Canadian federal election
Party	Candidate	Votes	%	±%
New Democratic	Arnold Webster	13,837	48.10	+6.12
Liberal	Douglas A. Walker	6,366	22.13	+12.71
Progressive Conservative	John Ferguson Browne	5,523	19.20	–23.51
Social Credit	Arthur Holmes	3,039	10.56	+4.68
Total valid votes		28,765	99.04	
Total rejected ballots		280	0.96	+0.23
Turnout		29,045	77.26	+3.75
Eligible voters		37,595		
New Democratic gain from Progressive Conservative		Swing		−3.30
Change for the New Democrats is based on the Co-operative Commonwealth.
Source: Library of Parliament

1958 Canadian federal election
Party	Candidate	Votes	%	±%
Progressive Conservative	John Ferguson Browne	11,928	42.71	+17.04
Co-operative Commonwealth	Alexander Macdonald	11,724	41.98	+7.66
Liberal	Everet King	2,631	9.42	–6.79
Social Credit	Gus Froese	1,642	5.88	–17.90
Total valid votes		27,925	99.26	
Total rejected ballots		207	0.74	–0.34
Turnout		28,132	73.51	+2.45
Eligible voters		38,270		
Progressive Conservative gain from Co-operative Commonwealth		Swing		+4.69
Source: Library of Parliament

1957 Canadian federal election
Party	Candidate	Votes	%	±%
Co-operative Commonwealth	Alexander Macdonald	9,040	34.33	–11.85
Progressive Conservative	John Ferguson Browne	6,762	25.68	+17.95
Social Credit	Thomas Williamson	6,262	23.78	–1.71
Liberal	Everett Crowley	4,270	16.21	–1.77
Total valid votes		26,334	98.93	
Total rejected ballots		286	1.07	+0.34
Turnout		26,620	71.06	+8.52
Eligible voters		37,463		
Co-operative Commonwealth hold		Swing		−14.90
Source: Library of Parliament

1953 Canadian federal election
Party	Candidate	Votes	%	±%
Co-operative Commonwealth	Angus MacInnis	10,162	46.18	–
Social Credit	Nicholas James Bartman	5,610	25.49	–
Liberal	Arthur Ralph Gordon Helps	3,957	17.98	–
Progressive Conservative	Walter Redvers Dent	1,700	7.72	–
Labor–Progressive	Mona Laufey Morgan	578	2.63	–
Total valid votes		22,007	99.26	
Total rejected ballots		163	0.74	–
Turnout		22,170	62.53	–
Eligible voters		35,453		
This riding was created from parts of Vancouver South, which elected a Liberal in the previous election.
Source: Library of Parliament

== See also ==
- List of Canadian electoral districts
- Historical federal electoral districts of Canada
