= John Ferguson Browne =

Canadian politician (1920–2014)

Member of the Canadian Parliament for Vancouver Kingsway
- In office 1958–1962
- Preceded by: Alex Macdonald
- Succeeded by: Arnold Webster

Personal details
- Born: November 11, 1920 Regina, Saskatchewan, Canada
- Died: June 9, 2014 (aged 93) Vancouver, British Columbia, Canada
- Party: Progressive Conservative Party
- Occupation: manager, traffic manager

John Ferguson "Fergie" Browne (November 11, 1920 – June 9, 2014) was a Canadian politician, manager and traffic manager.

Born in Regina, Saskatchewan to John Browne and Margaret Browne (née Ferguson), he was elected to the House of Commons of Canada as a Member of the Progressive Conservative Party in the 1958 election to represent the riding of Vancouver Kingsway. Prior to his federal political experience, he served during World War II in the Canadian Army in Canada, England, France, Belgium, the Netherlands and Germany. For his service, he was awarded the 1939-45 Star, the France and Germany Star, the War Medal, the Defence Medal and the Canadian Volunteer Service Medal with Overseas Clasp. He died at a Vancouver hospital on June 9, 2014.
