= Ghudani Khurd =

Coordinates: 30°43′N 76°02′E

Ghudani Khurd is a small village near Khanna, Punjab, in India. It comes under Tehsil Payal Dist. Ludhiana. The mother of Jagmeet Singh, leader of New Democratic Party Canada, is from here.

== Nearby villages ==
Below is the list of nearest villages:

- Jandali
- Nasrali
- Dhamot Kalan
- Aslapur
- Khakhon
- Ishanpur
- Jallah
- Jargari
- Taunsa
- Karaundia
- Rohnon Khurd
- Chima
- Dahmot Khurd
- Ghurani Khurd
- Rauni
- Isaru Kalan
- Julajan
- Diwa Mander
- Diwa Khosa
- Lasara
- Nizampur
- Lasara Pallewal
- Aluna Palla
- Ghadewal
- Khakhun
- Panjrukha
- Fatehpur
- Aluna Miana
- Sihaura
