= Jargari =

Coordinates: 30°38′N 76°03′E

Jargari is a small village near Khanna, Punjab, in northwest India. It comes under Tehsil Payal Dist. Ludhiana.

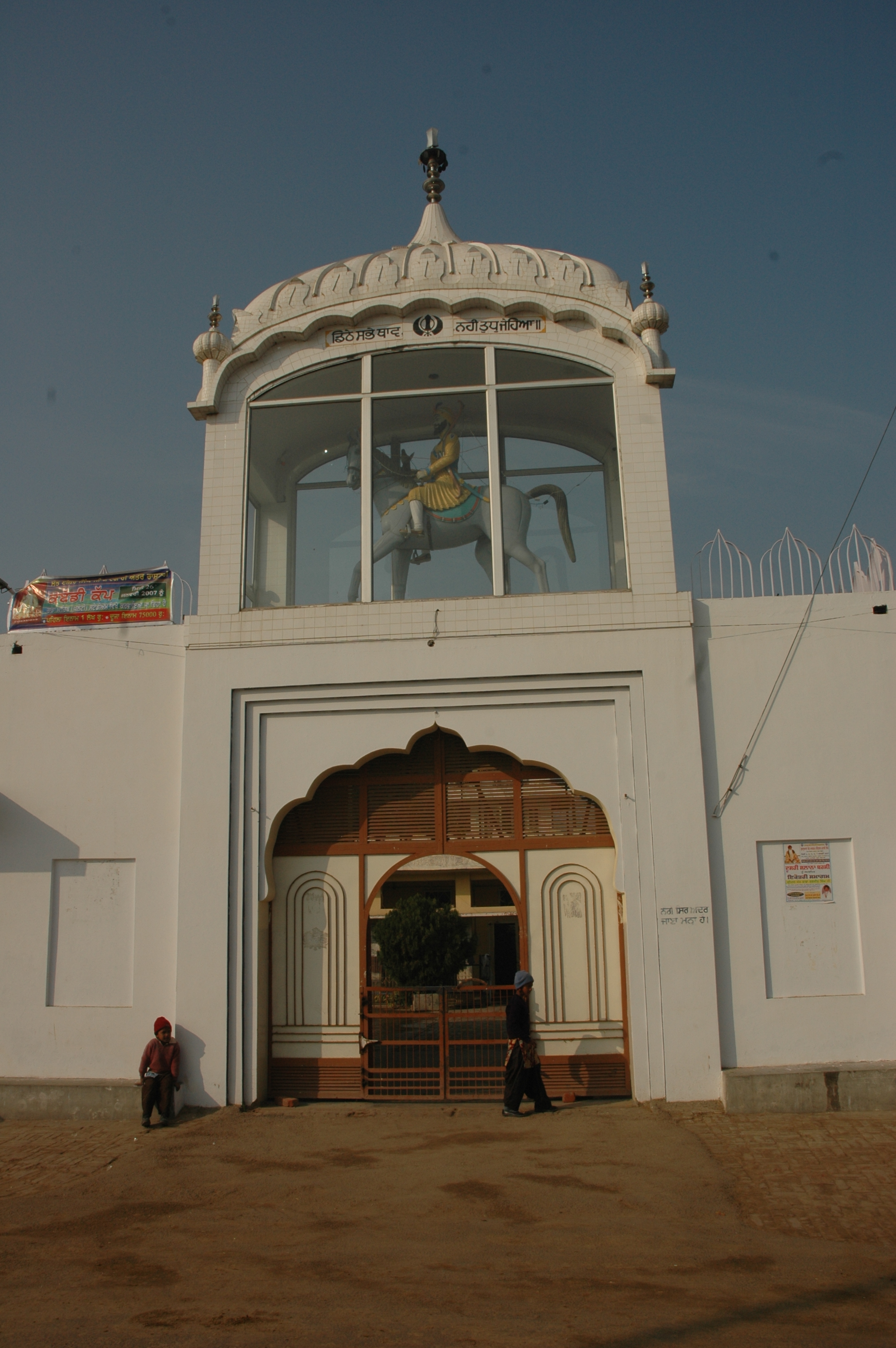
Gurudwara Sahib before Renovation

== Gurudwara Sahib ==
A gurudwara (Punjabi: ਗੁਰਦੁਆਰਾ, gurduārā or ਗੁਰਦਵਾਰਾ, gurdwārā; sometimes transliterated from Punjabi as gurdwara), meaning
"the doorway to the guru", is a place of worship for Sikhs. A gurudwara is also referred to as a "Sikh temple".

== Jargari Pind ==
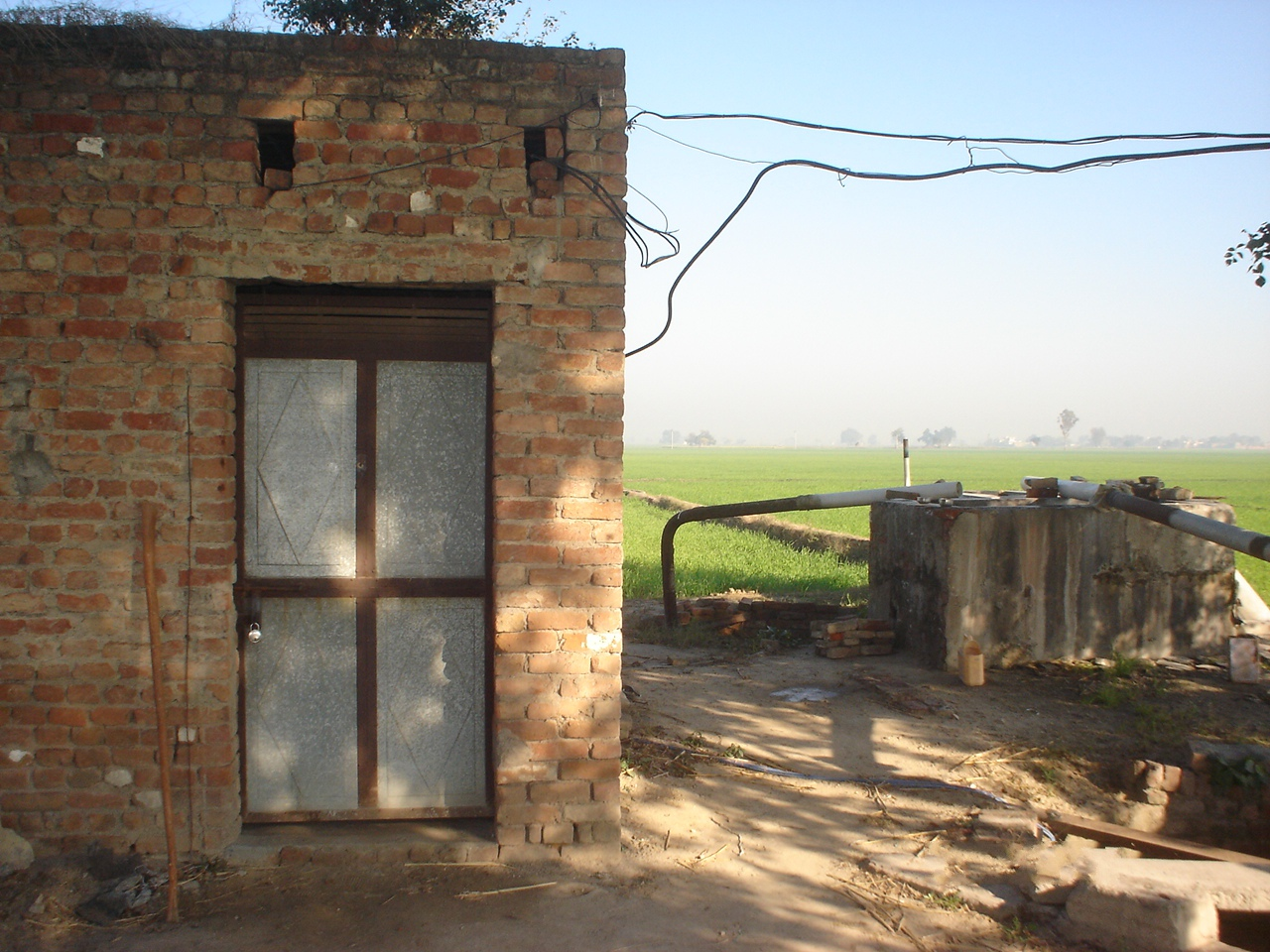
Motor

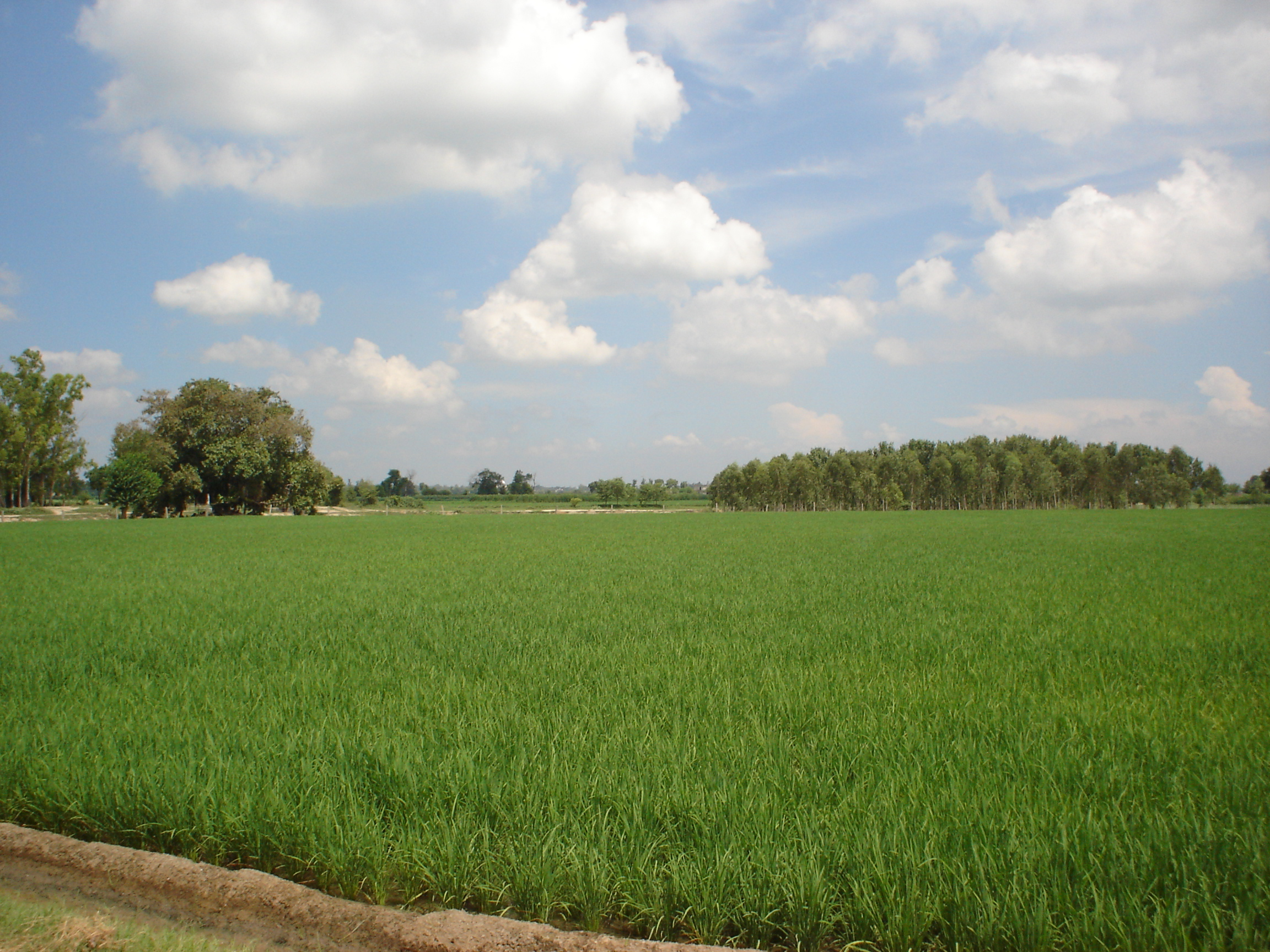
Jargari Khett

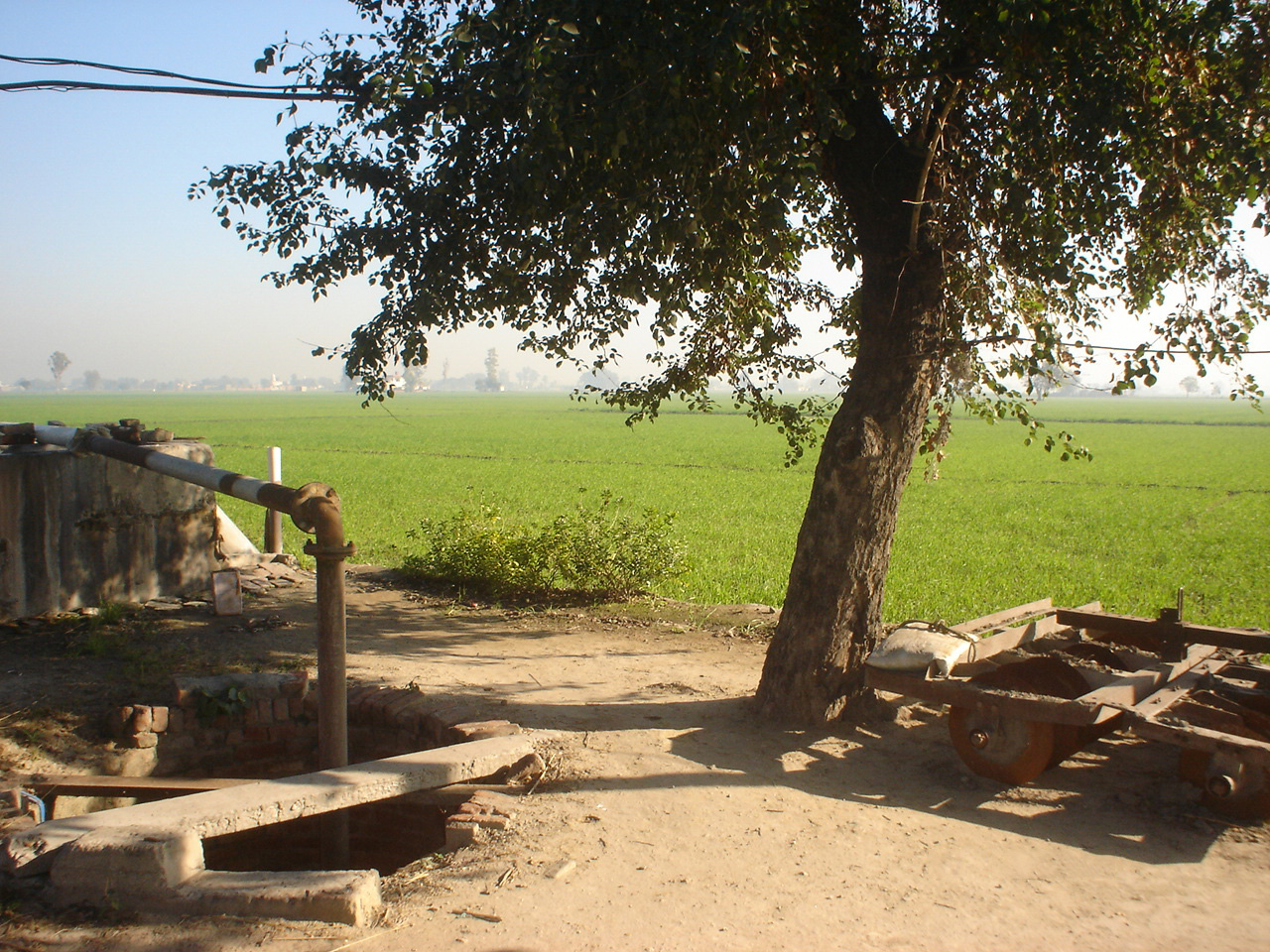
Borr

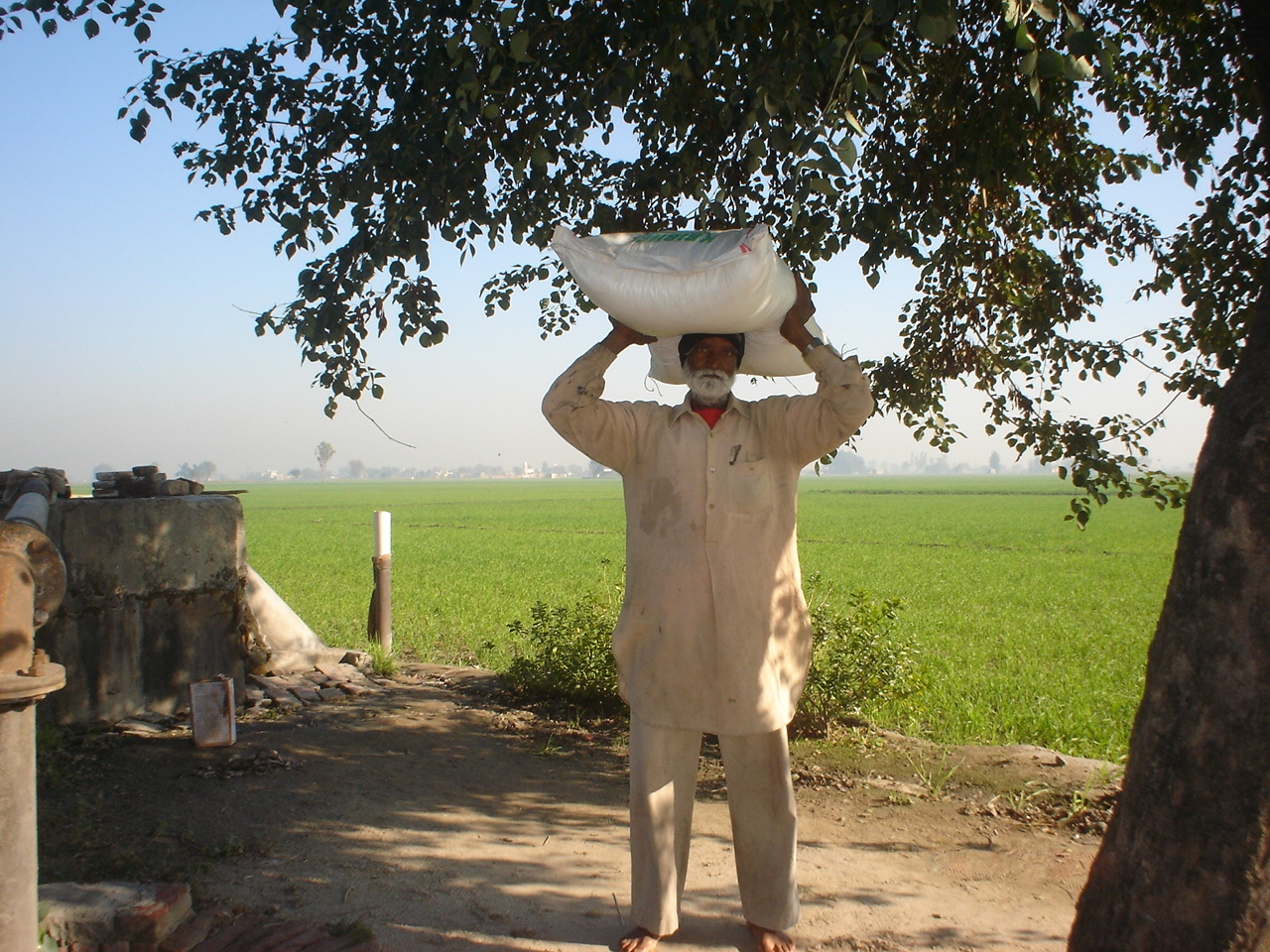
Sanjhi

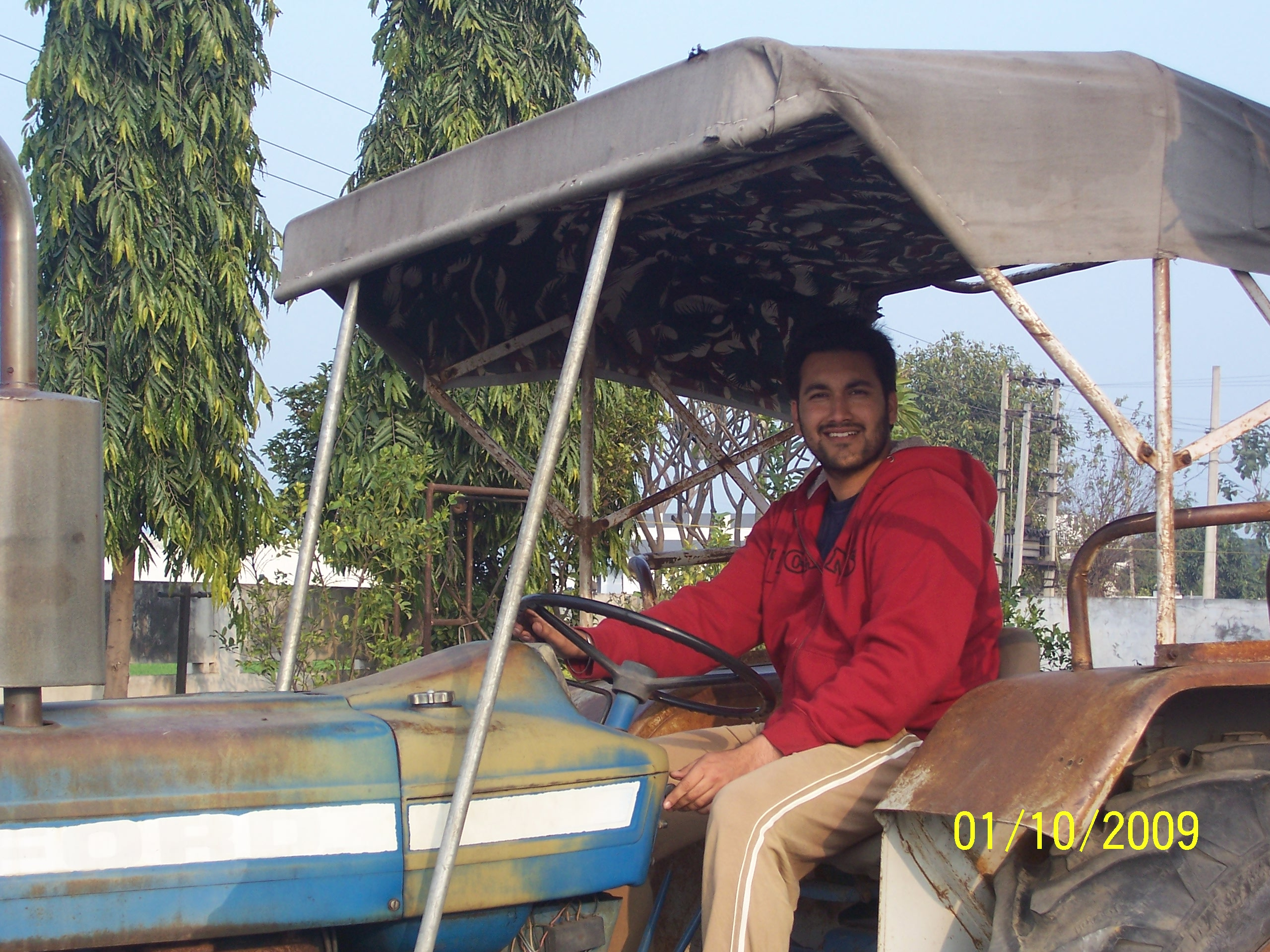
Old Ford 3610 tractor

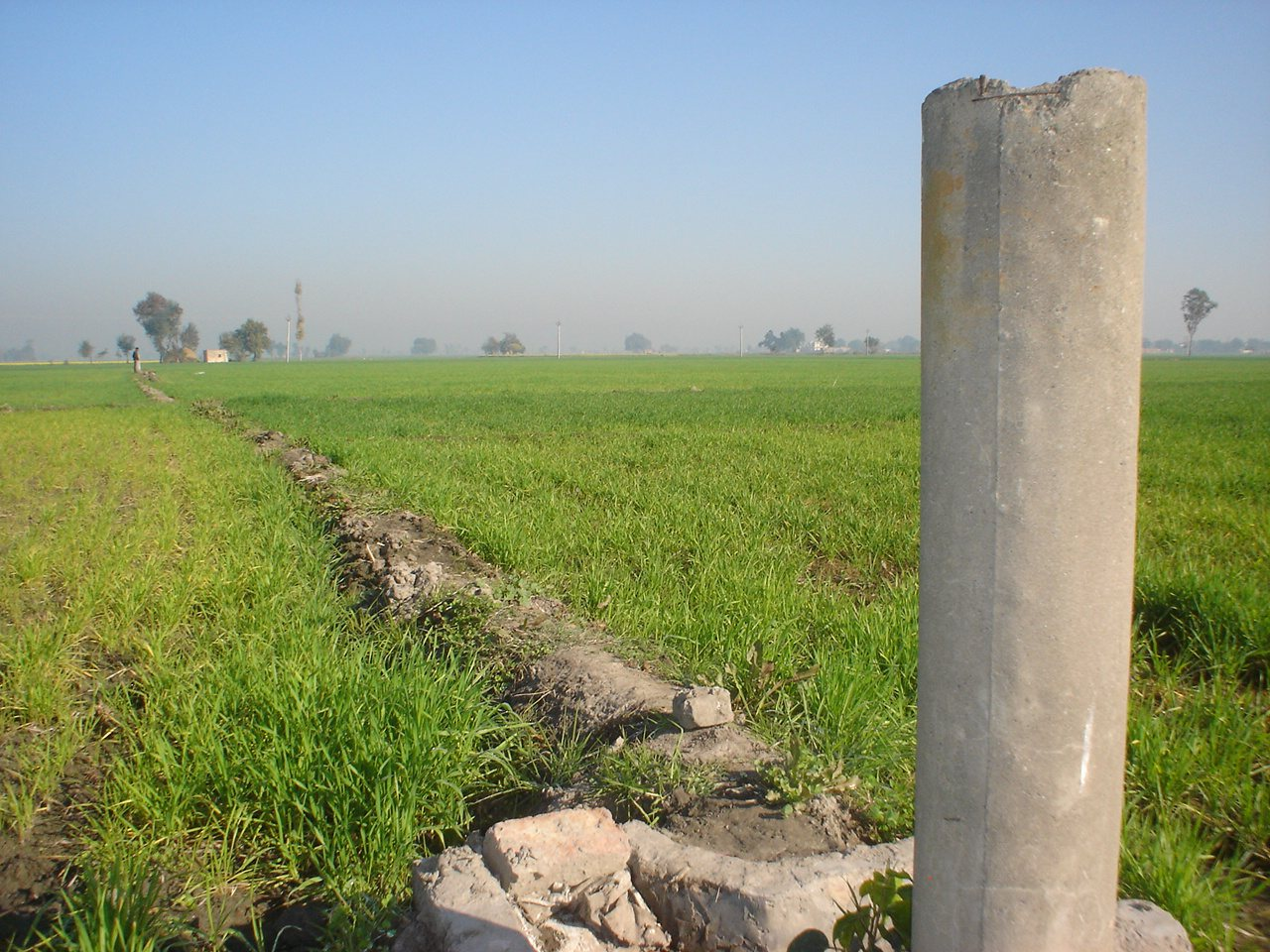
Old Style Irrigation System

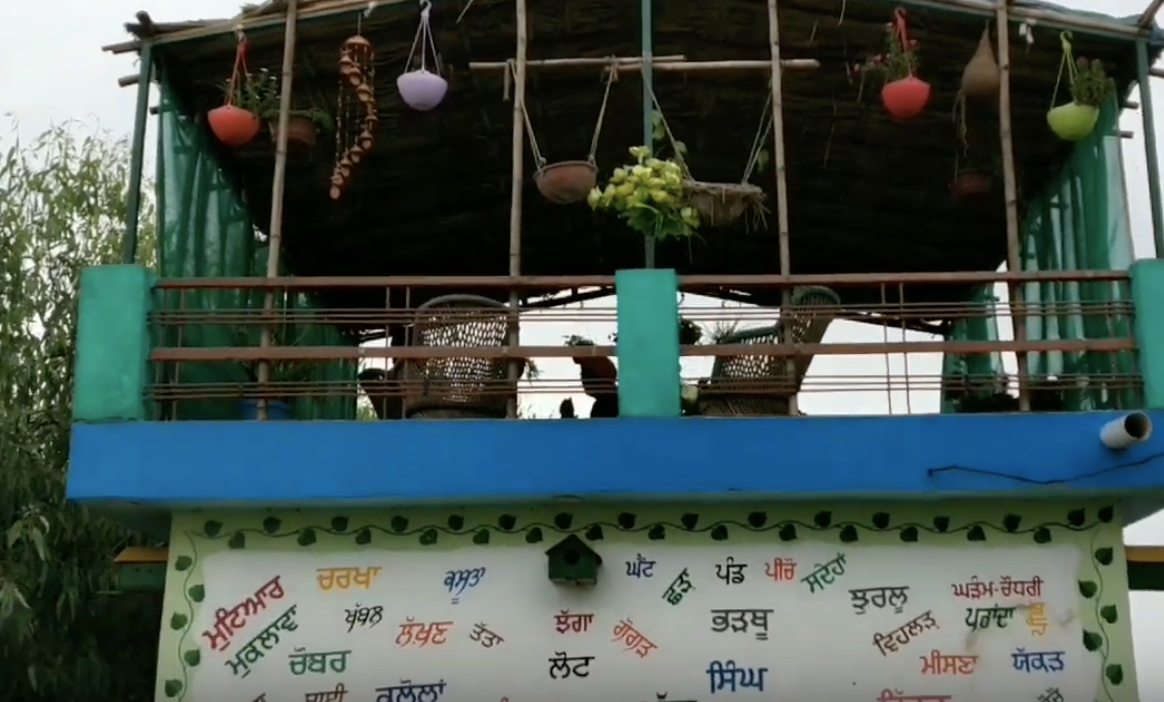
ਠੇਕਾ ਕਿਤਾਬ ਦੇਸੀ ਤੇ ਅੰਗਰੇਜ਼ੀ

== Nearby villages ==
Below is the list of nearest villages:

- Jandali
- Nasrali
- Dhamot Kalan
- Aslapur
- Khakhon
- Ishanpur
- Jallan
- Taunsa
- Karaundia
- Rohnon Khurd
- Chima
- Dahmot Khurd
- Ghurani Khurd
- Rauni
- Isaru Kalan
- Jallajan
- Diwa Mander
- Diwa Khosa
- Lasara
- Nizampur
- Lasara Pallewal
- Aluna Palla
- Ghadewal
- Khakhun
- Panjrukha
- Fatehpur
- Aluna Miana
- Sihaura
