= 2026 Conservative Party of British Columbia leadership election =

Political party leadership election in Canada

- May 30, 2026

9,211 points available 4,605.5 points needed to win
- Turnout: 25,695 (61.6%)
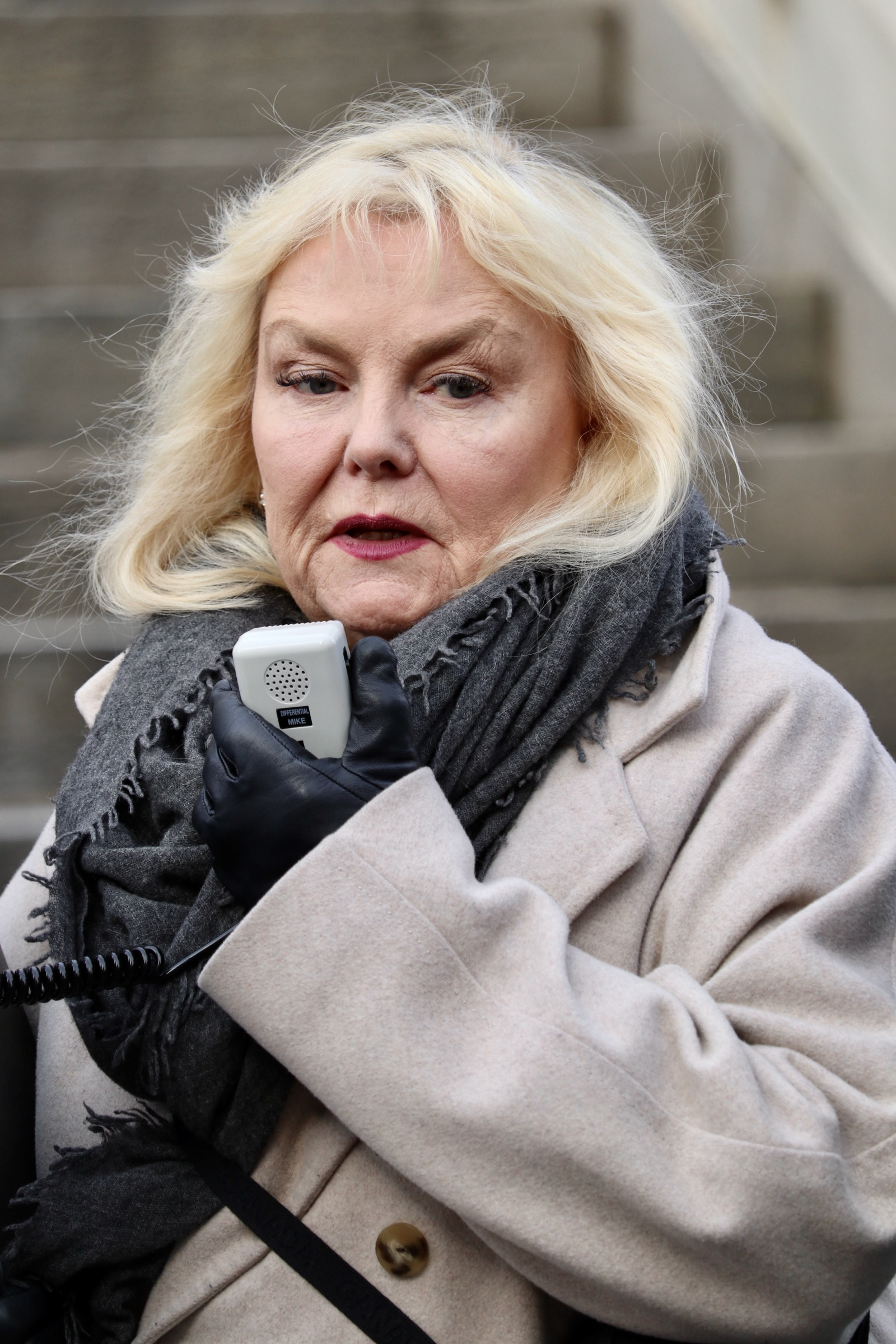

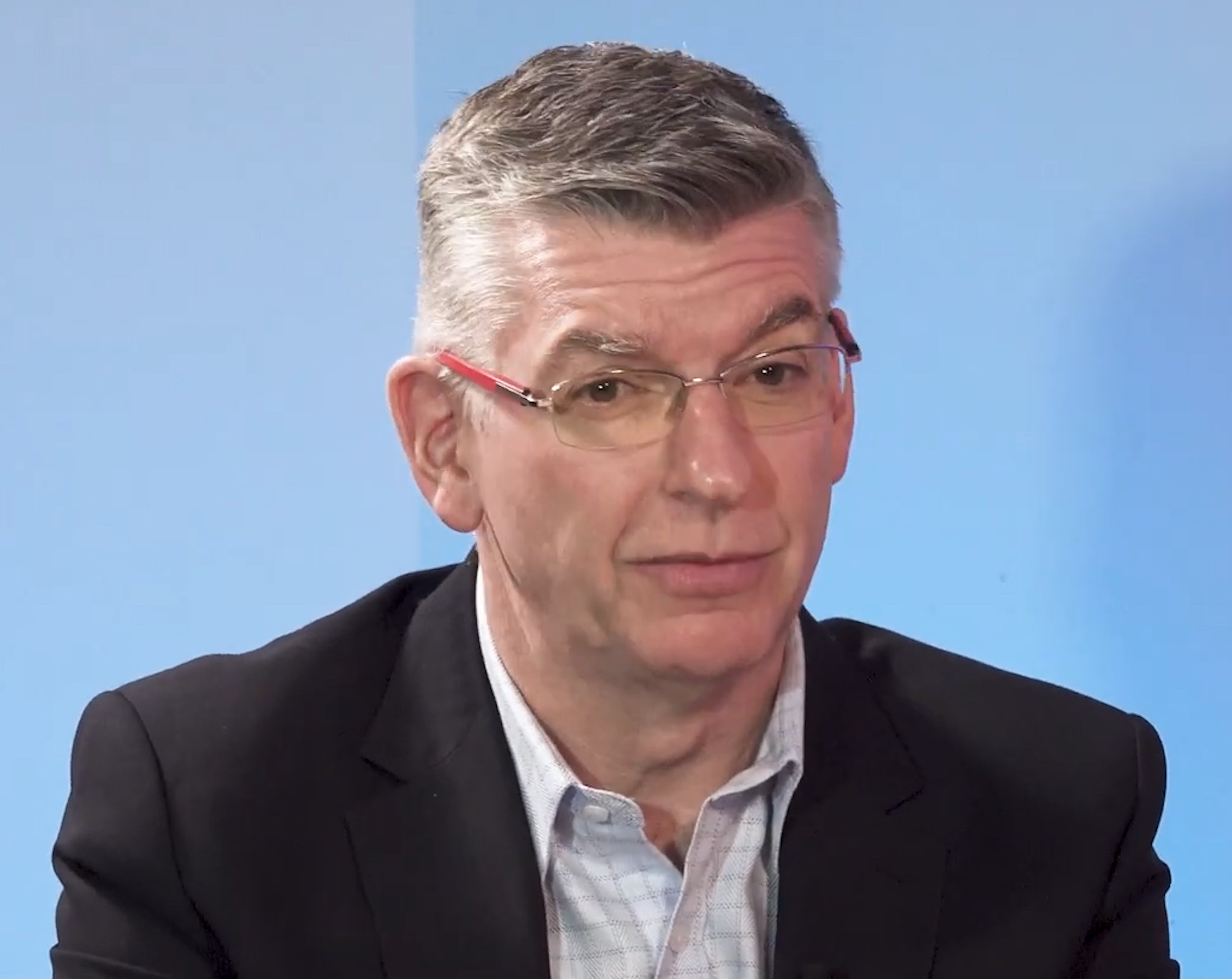

		CE
Candidate	Kerry-Lynne Findlay	Caroline Elliott	Iain Black
First round	2,806.42 (30.5%)	2,374.14 (25.8%)	1,863.82 (20.3%)
Fourth round	4,696.51 (51%)	4,514.49 (49%)	Eliminated
	YF
Candidate	Yuri Fulmer	Peter Milobar
First round	1,193.27 (13%)	971.34 (10.5%)
Fourth round	Eliminated	Eliminated
- Results by Riding and Round
Leader before election
Trevor Halford (interim)
Elected leader
Kerry-Lynne Findlay

2026 Conservative Party of British Columbia leadership election
- Date: May 30, 2026
- Convention: Rocky Mountaineer Station, Vancouver
- Resigning leader: John Rustad
- Won by: Kerry-Lynne Findlay
- Candidates: 5
- Entrance fee: $115,000
- Spending limit: $2,000,000

In 2026, the Conservative Party of British Columbia held a leadership election to choose a permanent leader to replace Trevor Halford, who became leader on an interim basis following the resignation of John Rustad. Rustad announced his resignation after a caucus revolt and internal party disputes on December 4, 2025. The election was won by former Conservative MP Kerry-Lynne Findlay by a narrow margin over Caroline Elliott, winning 51% of the vote.

== Background ==
Rustad, who was acclaimed leader in 2023, led his party into the 2024 British Columbia general election as the principal opposition party following BC United's decision to suspend its campaign and endorse Rustad's party. Preceding this, several BC United MLAs had defected to the Conservatives as opinion polls showed the party, which had no representation in the Legislative Assembly in decades, gaining momentum. The Conservatives won 44 seats, the party's best showing in over 70 years; the party hadn't won more than two seats in an election since 1953. On November 20, Rustad established his Official Opposition Shadow Cabinet, in which every Conservative MLA received a portfolio. Following the election, Rustad passed his leadership review with 70.66% support in 2025. His leadership in Opposition was marked by internal strife, with the departures and expulsions of many MLAs and the formation of a splinter party named OneBC.

On December 3, 2025, 20 caucus members signed a letter calling for Rustad to resign his position as leader. The party's board of directors passed a resolution ousting him as leader, and appointed Surrey-White Rock MLA Trevor Halford as interim leader. In a statement, the party said that Rustad was too "professionally incapacitated" to continue as leader. However, in the immediate aftermath, five Conservative MLAs refused to acknowledge the board's decision and said that Rustad remained party leader, and Rustad himself rejected the board's decision and declared that he was still the leader of the party. The next day, the Western Standard reported that Rustad would step down as leader, and shortly after he announced his resignation. During his resignation speech, he announced that he would also not stand for re-election at the next election.

== Rules ==
Candidates were required to pay a $5,000 application fee, a mandatory $20,000 refundable rules compliance deposit, and a total of $110,000 in non-refundable fees to remain in the race. The deadline to submit candidacy applications was February 15; they required 250 member signatures from at least five of the province's regions. Once approved, candidates were required to pay a second $10,000 fee, followed by $40,000 by April 1, and $60,000 by April 18. There was a $2,000,000 spending limit, with 20% of all monthly donations going to the party. The election itself was held using a weighted electoral district system, with each provincial riding allocated 100 points; ridings with fewer than 100 ballots were allocated points equal to the number of votes cast. The winner must receive more than 50% of the vote, as there will be candidate eliminations in every round of counting held. In order to be eligible to vote members must have been signed up by April 18. Members must be a Canadian citizen or permanent resident normally residing in British Columbia and at least 14 years of age.

== Campaign ==
=== Rules and finances ===
The Leadership Election Organizing Committee (LEOC) established a strict financial framework for the race, setting a spending limit of $2,000,000 per candidate and requiring that 20 percent of all monthly campaign donations be directed back to the party coffers. To maintain ballot eligibility, contestants faced a total entry cost of $135,000, which included a $5,000 initial application fee, a mandatory $20,000 refundable compliance deposit, and $110,000 in staggered non-refundable fees paid throughout the spring.

Voting was conducted entirely online through the Simply Voting system from May 23 until May 29, 2026, using a preferential ranked ballot. The election rules utilized a weighted point allocation system where each of British Columbia's provincial ridings carried 100 points, with the final scores adjusted for ridings capturing fewer than 100 cast ballots. To secure the leadership, a candidate needed to cross a 50 percent threshold under consecutive rounds of ballot counting. To qualify for a ballot, members were required to sign up by April 18, 2026, and clear a mandatory identity verification process via the online vendor Persona between April 27 and May 20, 2026.

=== Candidate platforms and messaging ===
Policy debates during the campaign centered primarily on the balance between social conservatism and fiscal management. Caroline Elliott oriented her platform around cultural issues alongside traditional fiscal policy, advocating for the repeal of the Declaration on the Rights of Indigenous Peoples Act (DRIPA) and criticizing the governing New Democratic Party (NDP) over public school curriculum standards. Her campaign drew national attention for its organizational structure, securing an external advisory team led by veteran political consultants Kory Teneycke and Nick Kouvalis.

Yuri Fulmer focused his campaign on public safety and economic growth through resource sector expansion. Addressing the province's projected $13.3 billion deficit, Fulmer rejected severe spending cuts in favor of corporate efficiencies and natural resource development in the energy and forestry sectors. Fulmer also proposed local coordination with the minor party OneBC, suggesting that the Conservatives could selectively decline to run candidates in certain ridings to prevent right-of-centre vote splitting.

=== Field consolidation ===
The candidate field consolidated heavily following the February 15 entry deadline. On February 27, Richmond-Queensborough MLA Steve Kooner withdrew from the race and endorsed candidate Kerry-Lynne Findlay. In mid-March, MLAs Bruce Banman and Harman Bhangu simultaneously suspended their campaigns; Banman directed his supporters to vote for Fulmer, while Bhangu endorsed Elliott.

On March 28, former grocery executive Darrell Jones also exited the race to back Elliott, endorsing her focus on small business relief and tax relief measures for younger workers. Following these candidate withdrawals, five candidates remained on the final electronic ballot: Iain Black, Caroline Elliott, Kerry-Lynne Findlay, Yuri Fulmer, and Peter Milobar, running to manage a total party membership that reached a record 42,000 by the close of the sign-up window.

== Timeline ==
=== 2025 ===
- December 3 – The party's board of directors passes a resolution ousting John Rustad as leader, and appoints Surrey-White Rock MLA Trevor Halford as interim leader. Rustad rejects the board's decision and declares himself still the leader of the party.
- December 4 – Rustad announces his resignation as party leader, and Halford officially becomes interim leader.
- December 15 – Businessman Warren Hamm announces his candidacy.

=== 2026 ===
- January 3 – The leadership election organizing committee, the body that governs the contest, is formed.
- January 6 – Businessman Yuri Fulmer announces his candidacy.
- January 8 – Sheldon Clare, MLA for Prince George-North Cariboo, announces his candidacy.
- January 13 – Caroline Elliott, former BC United vice-president, announces her candidacy.
- January 15 – Iain Black, former BC Liberal MLA for Port Moody-Westwood, announces his candidacy.
- January 16 – Party announces leadership race date for May 30 and the rules of the race. Peter Milobar, MLA for Kamloops Centre, announces his candidacy.
- January 27 – Darrell Jones, former president of the Pattison Food Group announces his candidacy.
- January 29 – Kerry-Lynne Findlay, former Conservative Cabinet Minister and MP for South Surrey—White Rock, announces her candidacy.
- February 2 – Bruce Banman, MLA for Abbotsford South, announces his candidacy.
- February 3 – Steve Kooner, MLA for Richmond-Queensborough, announces his candidacy.
- February 15 – Deadline to submit candidacy applications. Former Party Leader John Rustad announced he would not enter the leadership race after previously requesting and receiving a leadership application.
- February 18 – Harman Bhangu, MLA for Langley-Abbotsford, announces his candidacy.
- February 27 – Clare and Kooner drop out of the race and endorse Findlay.
- February 28 – Banman, Bhangu, Black, Elliott, Findlay, Fulmer, Hamm, Jones, and Milobar are officially approved as candidates having paid the $5,000 preliminary entry fee and collected signatures from at least 250 party members across the province, and had their application approved.
- March 15 – Banman suspends campaign and endorses Yuri Fulmer.
- March 16 – Bhangu suspends campaign and endorses Caroline Elliott.
- March 28 – Jones suspends campaign and endorses Caroline Elliott.
- April 1 – Deadline to pay $40,000 fee.
- April 8 – Juno News hosts a leadership debate.
- April 12 – Hamm suspends campaign and endorses Yuri Fulmer
- April 18 – Membership sign up cutoff. Deadline to pay $60,000 fee.
- April 24 – Canada Strong and Free Network hosts a leadership debate.
- April 28 – Conversations Live and Vancouver Sun host a leadership debate.
- May 9 – Conversations Global News and Resource Works host a leadership debate.
- May 23 – Voting begins.
- May 29 – Voting closes.
- May 30 – Announcement of the new leader.

== Candidates ==
=== Approved ===
Candidate	Experience	Announcement date	Slogan
Iain Black	MLA for Port Moody-Westwood and Port Moody-Coquitlam (2005–2011); Cabinet minister in the Campbell ministry (Labour 2010–2011; Small Business, Technology & Economic Development 2009–2010; Labour and Citizens Services 2008–2009); President and CEO of the Greater Vancouver Board of Trade (GVBOT) (2011–2019); 2025 federal Conservative candidate in Coquitlam—Port Coquitlam	January 15, 2026	"Get BC Back on Track"; Website
Caroline Elliott	Withdrawn BC United candidate for West Vancouver-Capilano in 2024; Political commentator and researcher (Note: As senior fellow at the Aristotle Foundation for Public Policy and contributor to various media outlets); Former BC United vice-president	January 13, 2026	"Win For BC"; Website
Kerry-Lynne Findlay	MP for South Surrey—White Rock (2019–2025) and for Delta—Richmond East (2011–2015); Federal Chief Opposition Whip (2022–2025); Federal Minister of National Revenue (2013–2015), Associate Minister of National Defence (2013)	January 29, 2026	"More Freedom Less Government!"; Website
Yuri Fulmer	2024 BC Conservative candidate in West Vancouver-Sea to Sky; Entrepreneur and investor (Note: As chair of Fulmer & Company, a private equity and venture capital firm Fulmer founded in 2010 and with substantial holdings/investment as of 2026.); Chancellor of Capilano University (2020–present); Chair of the Board of Trustees, United Way Worldwide (2024–present)	January 6, 2026	"Real Leadership"; Website
Peter Milobar	MLA for Kamloops Centre (2024–present), for Kamloops-North Thompson (2017–2024); Mayor of Kamloops (2008–2017), city councillor (2002–2008)	January 16, 2026	"Ready to Lead BC"; Website

=== Withdrawn ===
Candidate	Experience	Announcement date	Withdrawal date	Slogan	Ref.
Harman Bhangu	MLA for Langley-Abbotsford (2024–present)	February 18, 2026	March 16, 2026 (endorsed Elliott)	"Let's Rebuild BC Together"	
Bruce Banman	MLA for Abbotsford South (2020–present); BC Conservative caucus whip (2024–2025); City Councillor in Abbotsford (2018–2021); Mayor of Abbotsford (2011–2014)	February 2, 2026	March 15, 2026 (endorsed Fulmer)	"Conservative Without Apology"	
Sheldon Clare	MLA for Prince George-North Cariboo (2024–present)	January 8, 2026	February 27, 2026 (endorsed Findlay)	"It's Clear – It's Clare"	
Warren Hamm	Businessman	December 15, 2025	April 12, 2026 (endorsed Fulmer)	"Builders – Not Bureaucrats"	
Darrell Jones	Business executive	January 27, 2026	March 28, 2026 (endorsed Elliott)		
Steve Kooner	MLA for Richmond-Queensborough (2024–present)	February 3, 2026	February 27, 2026 (endorsed Findlay)	"Bring Back BC"	

=== Declined ===
- Christy Clark, Premier of British Columbia (2011–2017), Leader of the British Columbia Liberal Party (2011–2017)
- Gavin Dew, MLA for Kelowna-Mission (2024–present)
- Chris Gardner, President and CEO of Independent Contractors and Businesses Association
- Kiel Giddens, MLA for Prince George-Mackenzie (2024–present)
- Aaron Gunn, MP for North Island—Powell River (2025–present)
- Trevor Halford, MLA for Surrey-White Rock, interim Leader of the Conservative Party of British Columbia (2025–present)
- James Moore, MP for Port Moody—Westwood—Port Coquitlam (2000–2015), federal Cabinet minister (2008–2015) (endorsed Black)
- Ellis Ross, MP for Skeena—Bulkley Valley (2025–present), MLA for Skeena (2017–2024)
- John Rustad (Note: Rustad announced he would not enter the leadership race after previously requesting and receiving a leadership application.), MLA for Nechako Lakes, Leader of the Conservative Party of British Columbia (2023–2025), Leader of the Opposition of British Columbia (2024–2025)
- Elenore Sturko, MLA for Surrey-Cloverdale (2024–present), MLA for Surrey South (2022–2024) (sits as an independent in the legislature)
- Dianne Watts, MP for South Surrey—White Rock (2015–2017), Mayor of Surrey (2005–2014), Surrey City Councillor (1996–2005), runner-up in the 2018 British Columbia Liberal Party leadership election (endorsed Black)
- Brad West, Mayor of Port Coquitlam (2018–present)

== Endorsements ==
Iain Black

Current MLA (5)

- Tony Luck, MLA for Fraser-Nicola (2024–present)
- Korky Neufeld, MLA for Abbotsford West (2024–present)
- John Rustad, MLA for Nechako Lakes (2005–present), leader of the Conservative Party of British Columbia (2023–2025), Leader of the Opposition of British Columbia (2024–2025), minister in the Christy Clark ministry (2013–2017)
- Misty Van Popta, MLA for Langley-Walnut Grove (2024–present)
- Teresa Wat, MLA for Richmond-Bridgeport (2013–present), minister in the Christy Clark ministry (2013–2017)

Current MP (1)

- Scott Anderson, MP for Vernon—Lake Country—Monashee (2025–present), interim leader of the Conservative Party of British Columbia (2017–2019)

Former MLA (1)

- Mike de Jong, MLA for Abbotsford West (1994–2024), minister in the Campbell & C. Clark ministries (2013–2018), contestant in the 2011 & 2018 BC Liberal leadership contests

Former MP (4)

- Ed Fast, MP for Abbotsford (2006–2025), federal international trade minister in the Harper ministry (2011–2015)
- Gerry St. Germain, Senator for British Columbia (1993–2012), MP for Mission—Port Moody (1983–1988), federal minister of state in the Mulroney ministry (1988)
- James Moore, MP for Port Moody—Westwood—Port Coquitlam (2000–2015), federal industry and heritage minister in the Harper ministry (2008–2015)
- Dianne Watts, MP for South Surrey—White Rock (2015–2017), Mayor of Surrey (2005–2014), contestant in the 2018 BC Liberal leadership contest
Caroline Elliott

Current MLA (3)

- Harman Bhangu, MLA for Langley-Abbotsford (2024–present), withdrawn leadership candidate
- Kristina Loewen, MLA for Kelowna Centre (2024–present)
- Bryan Tepper, MLA for Surrey-Panorama (2024–present)

Former MP (1 + 1 non-BC)

- Stockwell Day, leader of the Canadian Alliance (2000–2001), federal cabinet minister in the Harper ministry (2006–2011), MP for Okanagan—Coquihalla (2000–2011), Alberta MLA for Red Deer-North (1986–2000) and minister in the Klein ministry (1992–2000)
- Jason Kenney, Premier of Alberta (2019–2022), MP for Calgary Midnapore (1997–2015), federal minister in the Harper ministry (2008–2015), Alberta MLA for Calgary-Lougheed (2017–2022)

Former MLA (2)

- Gordon Campbell, Premier of British Columbia (2001–2011), MLA for Vancouver-Point Grey/Quilchena (1993–2011), Mayor of Vancouver (1986–1993)
- Kevin Falcon, leader of BC United (2022–present), MLA for Vancouver-Quilchena (2022–2024) and for Surrey-Cloverdale (2001–2013), minister in the Campbell & C. Clark ministries (2011–2013), runner-up in the 2011 BC Liberal leadership contest

Media

- National Post

Other prominent individuals

- W. Brett Wilson, businessman, investor, former television personality
Kerry-Lynne Findlay

Current MLA (11)

- Tara Armstrong, MLA for Kelowna-Lake Country-Coldstream (2024–present) (sits as an independent)
- Brent Chapman, MLA for Surrey South (2024–present) (candidate's spouse)
- Sheldon Clare, MLA for Prince George-North Cariboo (2024–present), withdrawn leadership candidate
- Sharon Hartwell, MLA for Bulkley Valley-Stikine (2024–present)
- Jordan Kealy, MLA for Peace River North (2024–present) (sits as an independent)
- Anna Kindy, MLA for North Island (2024–present)
- Steve Kooner, MLA for Richmond-Queensborough (2024–present), withdrawn leadership candidate
- Heather Maahs, MLA for Chilliwack North (2024–present)
- Macklin McCall, MLA for West Kelowna-Peachland (2024–present)
- Lawrence Mok, MLA for Maple Ridge East (2024–present)
- David Williams, MLA for Salmon Arm-Shuswap (2024–present)

Current MP (1 non-BC)

- Leslyn Lewis, Ontario MP for Haldimand—Norfolk (2021–present)

Former MP (1)

- David Wilks, MP for Kootenay-Columbia (2011–2015), Mayor of Sparwood (2005–2011, 2018–present)
Yuri Fulmer

Current MLA (2)

- Bruce Banman, MLA for Abbotsford South (2020–present), Mayor of Abbotsford (2011–2014), withdrawn leadership candidate
- Dallas Brodie, Interim leader of OneBC (2025–present), MLA for Vancouver–Quilchena (2024–present) (sits as a member of OneBC)
Peter Milobar

Current MLA (9)

- Pete Davis, MLA for Kootenay-Rockies (2024–present)
- Brennan Day, MLA for Courtenay-Comox (2024–present)
- Gavin Dew, MLA for Kelowna-Mission (2024–present)
- Lorne Doerkson, MLA for Cariboo-Chilcotin (2020–present)
- Kiel Giddens, MLA for Prince George-Mackenzie (2024–present)
- Linda Hepner, MLA for Surrey-Serpentine River (2024–present), Mayor of Surrey (2014–2018)
- Scott McInnis, MLA for Columbia River-Revelstoke (2024–present)
- Ian Paton, MLA for Delta South (2017–present)
- Ward Stamer, MLA for Kamloops-North Thompson (2024–present), Mayor of Barriere (2018–2024)

Former MLA (1)

- Joan Isaacs, MLA for Coquitlam-Burke Mountain (2017–2020)

Former federal parliamentarian (1)

- Nancy Greene Raine, Senator for British Columbia (2009–2018)

== Debates ==
Debates among candidates for the 2026 Conservative Party of British Columbia leadership election
No.	Date	Place	Host	Participants — P Participant N Not invited A Absent invitee O Out of race (withdrawn or disqualified)						References
No.	Date	Place	Host	Black	Elliott	Findlay	Fulmer	Hamm	Milobar	References
1	April 8, 2026	New Westminster, British Columbia	Juno News	P	A	P	P	P	A	
2	April 24, 2026	Vancouver, British Columbia	Canada Strong and Free Network	P	P	P	P	O	P	
3	April 28, 2026	Vancouver, British Columbia	Conversations Live/Vancouver Sun	P	P	P	P	O	P	
4	May 9, 2026	Burnaby, British Columbia	Global News/Resource Works	P	P	P	P	O	P	

== Opinion polling among Conservative Party voters ==
=== Polling after candidate deadline ===
Polling source	Link	Date(s) administered	Sample size	Margin of error	Iain Black	Caroline Elliott	Kerry-Lynne Findlay	Yuri Fulmer	Darrell Jones	Peter Milobar	Other/ Undecided						
Polling source	Link	Date(s) administered	Sample size	Margin of error	Pallas Data		May 1–2, 2026	1,253	±2.8%	17.7%	Other/ Undecided	30.5%	23.9%	7.5%	–	8.8%	11.5%
Research Co.		April 16–18, 2026	803	±3.5%	19%	24%	21%	20%	–	24%	–						
		April 12, 2026	Hamm suspends campaign														
		March 28, 2026	Jones suspends campaign														
Mainstreet		March 19–22, 2026	2,578	±1.93%	8.4%	21.2%	8.1%	5.4%	3.9%	20.8%	31.6% Hamm 0.6%						
		March 15–16, 2026	Banman and Bhangu suspend campaigns														
Pallas Data		March 2, 2026	1,256	±2.8%	7%	15%	7%	3%	7%	9%	Bhangu 4% Other 2% Undecided 47%						

=== Hypothetical polling before candidate deadline ===
Polling source	Link	Date(s) administered	Sample size	Margin of error	Iain Black	Sheldon Clare	Caroline Elliott	Kerry-Lynne Findlay	Yuri Fulmer	Aaron Gunn	Darrell Jones	Peter Milobar	Other/ Undecided
Polling source	Link	Date(s) administered	Sample size	Margin of error			February 27, 2026	Clare and Kooner suspend campaigns					Other/ Undecided
Pallas Data		February 15–19, 2026	401	±3.1%	6%	–	16%	3%	2%	–	9%	5%	Other 5% Undecided 54%
Western Standard		January 2026	578	–	8.5%	18.4%	17.1%	–	20.5%	–	16.7%	18.8%	Undecided 47.4%
		December 24, 2025	Gunn declines to run										
Mainstreet Research		December 17–18, 2025	1,902	±2.2%	4%	–	1%	1%	1%	18%	–	6%	Other 3% Undecided 66%
Pallas Data		December 11–13, 2025	923	±3.2%	1%	–	8%	10%	1%	23%	–	8%	Other 4% Undecided 44%

== Results ==
= Eliminated from next round
= Winner

Candidate	Ballot 1		Ballot 2		Ballot 3		Ballot 4	
Name	Votes	Points	Votes	Points	Votes	Points	Votes	Points
Kerry-Lynne Findlay	7,583; 29.9%	2806.42; 30.5%	7,844; 30.9%	2961.53; 32.2%	9,050; 35.7%	3559.78; 38.6%	10,907; 43.0%	4696.51; 51.0%
Caroline Elliott	6,760; 26.7%	2374.14; 25.8%	7,393; 29.2%	2638.74; 28.6%	7,800; 30.76%	2883.71; 31.3%	10,847; 42.8%	4514.49; 49.0%
Iain Black	4,902; 19.3%	1865.82; 20.3%	6,077; 24.0%	2328.21; 25.3%	6971; 27.5%	2767.51; 30.0%	Eliminated	
Yuri Fulmer	3,163; 12.5%	1193.27; 13.0%	3,344; 13.2%	1282.52; 13.9%	Eliminated			
Peter Milobar	2,893; 11.4%	971.34; 10.5%	Eliminated					
Total Valid	25,301	9211.0	24,658	9211.0	23,821	9211.0	21,754	9211.0
Abstain / exhausted	58; 0.2%	n/a	701; 2.8%	n/a	1538; 6.1%	n/a	3,605; 14.2%	n/a

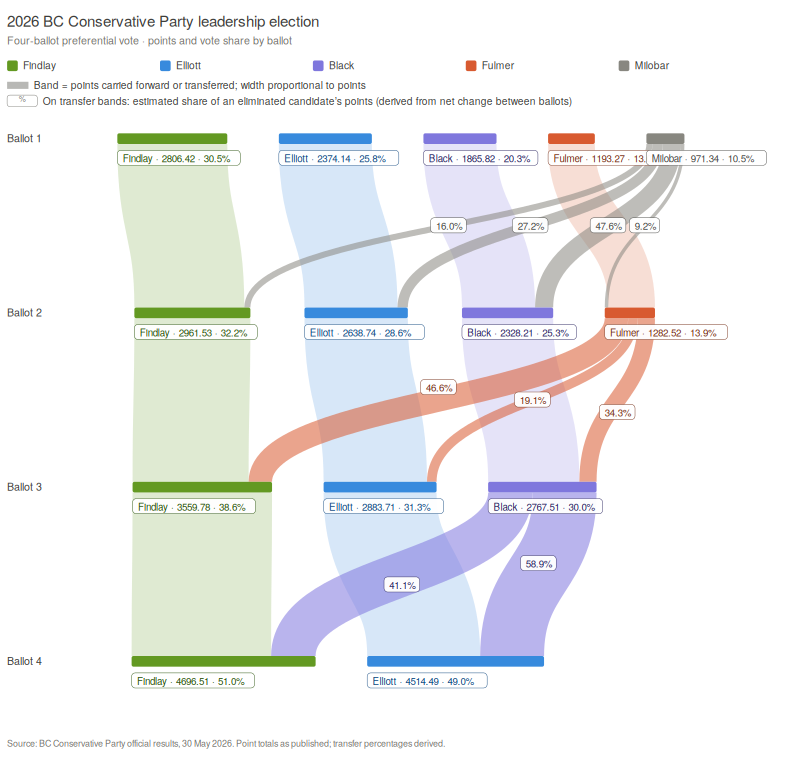
Sankey diagram of results round-to-round

=== Local results for round 1 ===
contestant being ballot leader
contestant with +50% support
contestant overperformed provincial average by +50%
contestant underperformed provincial average by +50%

with local endorsement(s)
local endorsement corresponded with contestant being ballot leader
local endorsement corresponded with contestant overperformed provincial average by +50%
local endorsement corresponded with contestant underperforming provincial average

All cells display points above votes

Electoral District local endorsements	Black	Elliott	Findlay	Fulmer	Milobar	Abs (Note: Abstension)	Total
Interior North	112.33 (10.2%); 246	222.38 (20.3%); 512	411.79 (37.6%); 943	130.32 (11.9%); 286	219.2 (20.0%); 803		1096; 2790
Bulkley Valley-Stikine; MLA Sharon Hartwell - Findlay	5.75; 10	25.86; 45	59.20 103	6.32; 11	2.87; 5	1	100; 175
Cariboo—Chilcotin; MLA Lorne Doerkson - Milobar	4.39; 13	22.30; 66	30.07; 89	13.18; 39	30.07 89	3	100; 299
Kamloops Centre	5.13; 21	9.78; 40	17.60; 72	6.36; 26	61.12; 250	1	100; 410
Kamloops-North Thompson; MLA Ward Stamer - Milobar	4.13; 25	13.72; 83	21.82; 132	5.79; 35	54.55 330	0	100; 605
Nechako Lakes; MLA John Rustad endorsed Black	15.92 25	17.20; 27	27.39; 43	31.21; 49	8.28; 13	0	100; 157
Peace River North; MLA Jordan Kealy - Findlay	12.11; 31	21.48; 55	49.61 127	8.59; 22	8.20; 21	0	100; 256
Peace River South	4.20; 5	19.33; 23	53.78; 64	12.61; 15	10.08; 12	0	100; 119
Prince George-Mackenzie; MLA Kiel Giddens - Milobar	17.89; 44	20.73; 51	39.84; 98	10.98; 27	10.57 26	0	100; 246
Prince George-North Cariboo; MLA Sheldon Clare - Findlay	9.88; 24	23.46; 57	45.68 111	7.82; 19	13.17; 32	0	100; 243
Prince George-Valemount	16.93; 32	18.52; 35	41.80; 79	17.46; 33	5.29; 10	0	100; 189
Skeena	16; 16	30; 30	25.00; 25	10; 10	15; 15	0	96; 96
Interior South	121.79 (9.4%); 405	309.27 (23.8%); 942	486.75 (37.4%); 1506	204.4 (15.7%); 620	177.83 (13.7%); 542		1300; 4015
Boundary-Similkameen	10.44; 26	22.09; 55	41.37; 103	14.46; 36	11.65; 29	0	100; 249
Columbia River-Revelstoke; MLA Scott McInnis - Milobar	8.14; 14	25.00; 43	30.81; 53	8.72; 15	27.33 47	0	100; 172
Fraser-Nicola; MLA Tony Luck - Black	13.60 31	28.07; 64	35.09; 80	10.53; 24	12.72; 29	2	100; 230
Kelowna Centre; MLA Kristina Loewen - Elliott	8.83; 28	35.33 112	26.50; 84	16.40; 52	12.93; 41	0	100; 317
Kelowna-Lake Country-Coldstream; MLA Tara Armstrong - Findlay	10.21; 49	18.75; 90	37.08 178	23.54; 113	10.42; 50	0	100; 480
Kelowna-Mission; MLA Gavin Dew - Milobar	12.53; 62	24.65; 122	35.96; 178	12.73; 63	14.14 70	1	100; 496
Kootenay Central; Ex-MP David Wilks - Findlay	2.88; 6	23.08; 48	46.63 97	23.56; 49	3.85; 8	0	100; 208
Kootenay-Monashee	4.76; 7	19.05; 28	44.22; 65	25.17; 37	6.80; 10	0	100; 147
Kootenay-Rockies; MLA Pete Davis - Milobar	5.81; 14	18.67; 45	31.54; 76	19.09; 46	24.90 60	1	100; 242
Penticton-Summerland	7.98; 19	28.99; 69	33.61; 80	13.87; 33	15.55; 37	2	100; 240
Salmon Arm-Shuswap; MLA David Williams - Findlay	7.95; 38	18.62; 89	42.05 201	13.18; 63	18.20; 87	3	100; 481
Vernon-Lumby; MP Scott Anderson - Black	18.66 75	18.91; 76	38.56; 155	13.43; 54	10.45; 42	0	100; 402
West Kelowna-Peachland; MLA Macklin McCall - Findlay	10; 36	28.06; 101	43.33 156	9.72; 35	8.89; 32	1	100; 361
Fraser Valley North	178.06 (17.8%); 529	247.99 (24.8%); 728	370.58 (37.1%); 1084	136.19 (13.6%); 416	67.16 (6.7%); 194		1000; 2951
Abbotsford South; MLA Bruce Banman - Fulmer	23.05; 77	20.06; 67	33.53; 112	15.87 53	7.49; 25	2	100; 336
Abbotsford West; MLA Korky Neufeld, ex-MLA Mike de Jong & ex MP Ed Fast endorsed Black	24.25 81	15.87; 53	31.44; 105	23.65; 79	4.79; 16	0	100; 334
Abbotsford-Mission	18.40; 53	23.61; 68	34.03; 98	18.06; 52	5.90; 17	2	100; 290
Chilliwack North; MLA Heather Maahs - Findlay	10.88; 26	23.43; 56	46.44 111	10.46; 25	8.79; 21	2	100; 241
Chilliwack-Cultus Lake	15.44; 40	26.25; 68	41.31; 107	9.65; 25	7.34; 19	4	100; 263
Langley—Abbotsford; MLA Harman Bhangu - Elliott	14.52; 71	27.81 136	37.42; 183	14.72; 72	5.52; 27	1	100; 490
Langley-Walnut Grove; MLA Misty Van Popta - Black	25.00 65	30.38; 79	31.92; 83	5.38; 14	7.31; 19	0	100; 260
Langley-Willowbrook	18.68; 48	24.51; 63	39.69; 102	11.67; 30	5.45; 14	1	100; 258
Maple Ridge East; MLA Lawrence Mok- Findlay	13.11; 35	28.84; 77	35.96 96	14.23; 38	7.87; 21	2	100; 269
Maple Ridge-Pitt Meadows	14.73; 33	27.23; 61	38.84; 87	12.50; 28	6.70; 15	0	100; 224
Lower Mainland	887.45 (28.6%); 2285	796.07 (25.7%); 2507	758.18 (24.5%); 2142	428.54 (13.8%); 1112	228.78 (7.38%); 634		3099; 8680
Burnaby Centre	32.17; 46	19.58; 28	13.99; 20	27.97; 40	6.29; 9	2	100; 145
Burnaby East	23.97; 35	26.71; 39	28.08; 41	13.01; 19	8.22; 12	0	100; 146
Burnaby North	27.27; 45	35.15; 58	21.82; 36	10.30; 17	5.45; 9	0	100; 165
Burnaby South-Metrotown	30.08; 37	23.58; 29	19.51; 24	21.14; 26	5.69; 7	0	100; 123
Burnaby—New Westminster	29.60; 37	19.20; 24	25.60; 32	12; 15	13.60; 17	0	100; 125
Coquitlam-Burke Mountain	47.76; 117	19.18; 47	18.78; 46	7.76; 19	6.53; 16	0	100; 245
Coquitlam-Maillardville	37.50; 69	21.74; 40	21.20; 39	13.59; 25	5.98; 11	1	100; 185
Delta North	31.79; 89	23.93; 67	23.93; 67	13.93; 39	6.43; 18	0	100; 280
Delta South; MLA Ian Paton - Milobar	15.54; 55	31.92; 113	20.06; 71	8.76; 31	23.73 84	0	100; 354
New Westminster—Coquitlam	23.08; 33	27.27; 39	30.07; 43	13.99; 20	5.59; 8	1	100; 144
North Vancouver-Lonsdale	15.70; 46	48.81; 143	17.06; 50	11.95; 35	6.48; 19	1	100; 294
North Vancouver-Seymour	16.11; 72	50.78; 227	17.23; 77	9.62; 43	6.26; 28	0	100; 447
Port Coquitlam; Ex MP James Moore - Black	35.05 75	22.43; 48	28.97; 62	7.94; 17	5.61; 12	0	100; 214
Port Moody-Burquitlam; Ex-MP/Senator Gerry St. Germain - Black	37.87 103	31.62; 86	19.49; 53	8.46; 23	2.57; 7	0	100; 272
Powell River-Sunshine Coast	21.01; 75	26.89; 96	33.61; 120	13.45; 48	5.04; 18	1	100; 358
Richmond Centre	50; 50	12; 12	10; 10	11; 11	16; 16	0	99; 99
Richmond-Bridgeport; MLA Teresa Wat - Black	49.32 73	21.62; 32	17.57; 26	4.05; 6	7.43; 11	0	100; 148
Richmond-Queensborough; MLA Steve Kooner - Findlay	39.04; 89	14.04; 32	28.95 66	10.53; 24	7.46; 17	4	100; 232
Richmond-Steveston	39.29; 99	22.22; 56	19.44; 49	7.14; 18	11.90; 30	0	100; 252
Surrey City Centre	28.38; 42	14.86; 22	35.14; 52	16.22; 24	5.41; 8	0	100; 148
Surrey North	28.75; 69	14.58; 35	26.67; 64	24.17; 58	5.83; 14	0	100; 240
Surrey South; MLA Brent Chapman - Findlay	19.39; 115	23.44; 139	40.64 241	9.27; 55	7.25; 43	1	100; 594
Surrey-Cloverdale; Ex-MLA Kevin Falcon - Elliott	21.80; 58	23.68 63	36.09; 96	12.78; 34	5.64; 15	1	100; 267
Surrey-Fleetwood	24.88; 54	15.67; 34	27.19; 59	28.11; 61	4.15; 9	3	100; 220
Surrey-Guildford	24.10; 40	24.10; 40	33.13; 55	15.06; 25	3.61; 6	0	100; 166
Surrey—Newton	25; 66	22.35; 59	25; 66	23.48; 62	4.17; 11	1	100; 265
Surrey-Panorama; MLA Bryan Tepper - Elliott	25.09; 70	22.22 62	26.16; 73	17.56; 49	8.96; 25	0	100; 279
Surrey-Serpentine River; MLA Linda Hepner - Milobar	16.58; 63	17.37; 66	32.63; 124	25; 95	8.42 32	3	100; 383
Surrey—White Rock; Ex -MP Dianne Watts - Black	20.28 130	28.71; 184	37.44; 240	5.62; 36	7.96; 51	0	100; 641
West Vancouver-Capilano	27.97; 231	48.79; 403	10.29; 85	7.26; 60	5.69; 47	0	100; 826
West Vancouver-Sea To Sky	23.08; 102	41.63; 184	12.44; 55	17.42; 77	5.43; 24	1	100; 443
City of Vancouver	361.24 (31.4%); 931	369.39 (32.1%); 1019	190.88 (16.6%); 428	117.75 (10.2%); 305	112.76 (9.8%); 282		1152; 2965
Vancouver-Fraserview	33.73; 56	18.67; 31	24.10; 40	10.24; 17	13.25; 22	0	100; 166
Vancouver-Hastings	23.13; 37	38.13; 61	23.75; 38	7.50; 12	7.50; 12	0	100; 160
Vancouver-Kensington	26.70; 47	25.00; 44	13.64; 24	11.93; 21	22.73; 40	1	100; 177
Vancouver-Langara	48.31; 114	15.25; 36	11.44; 27	18.64; 44	6.36; 15	0	100; 236
Vancouver-Little Mountain	33.92; 96	35.69; 101	12.72; 36	9.54; 27	8.13; 23	0	100; 283
Vancouver—Point Grey; Ex-Premier Gordon Campbell - Elliott	27.08; 101	39.95 149	13.94; 52	10.19; 38	8.85; 33	0	100; 373
Vancouver-Quilchena; MLA Dallas Brodie - Fulmer	33.97; 232	39.09; 267	8.35; 57	9.81 67	8.78; 60	2	100; 685
Vancouver-Renfrew	33.00; 33	15.00; 15	16.00; 16	5.00; 5	5.00; 5	0	74; 74
Vancouver-South Granville	27.52; 71	39.53; 102	13.18; 34	8.91; 23	10.85; 28	0	100; 258
Vancouver-Strathcona	24; 24	25; 25	16; 16	8; 8	5; 5	0	78; 78
Vancouver-West End	22.32; 50	34.38; 77	26.34; 59	8.93; 20	8.04; 18	0	100; 224
Vancouver-Yaletown	27.56; 70	43.70; 111	11.42; 29	9.06; 23	8.27; 21	0	100; 254
Vancouver Island	204.98 (13.1%); 506	429.04 (27.4%); 1052	588.25 (37.6%); 1480	176.1 (11.3%); 424	165.64 (10.6%); 438		1564; 3900
Courtenay-Comox	9.38; 39	20.91; 87	43.75; 182	9.86; 41	16.11; 67	0	100; 416
Cowichan Valley; MLA Brennan Day - Milobar	7.41; 20	21.11; 57	52.59; 142	11.11; 30	7.78 21	0	100; 270
Esquimalt-Colwood	13.30; 27	26.11; 53	32.51; 66	15.27; 31	12.81; 26	0	100; 203
Juan De Fuca-Malahat	10.25; 25	26.64; 65	48.77; 119	8.61; 21	5.74; 14	1	100; 245
Ladysmith-Oceanside	17.26; 68	26.14; 103	36.04; 142	10.91; 43	9.64; 38	0	100; 394
Langford-Highlands	13.53; 23	22.94; 39	45.88; 78	11.18; 19	6.47; 11	0	100; 170
Mid Island-Pacific Rim	6.10; 15	32.11; 79	39.02; 96	12.60; 31	10.16; 25	2	100; 248
Nanaimo-Gabriola Island	9.00; 18	31.00; 62	42.50; 85	10.00; 20	7.50; 15	0	100; 200
Nanaimo-Lantzville	14.46; 35	29.75; 72	34.71; 84	9.09; 22	11.98; 29	0	100; 242
North Coast-Haida Gwaii	12.39; 12	20.65; 20	19.61; 19	10.32; 10	1.03; 1	2	64; 64
North Island; MLA Anna Kindy - Findlay	11.11; 34	24.51; 75	46.41 142	9.48; 29	8.50; 26	0	100; 306
Oak Bay-Gordon Head	19.42; 54	32.73; 91	19.78; 55	10.07; 28	17.99; 50	1	100; 279
Saanich North and the Islands	15.13; 41	26.57; 72	33.95; 92	8.86; 24	15.50; 42	0	100; 271
Saanich South	16.48; 45	27.84; 76	29.30; 80	13.19; 36	13.19; 36	0	100; 273
Victoria-Beacon Hill	17.26; 34	35.03; 69	24.37; 48	9.14; 18	14.21; 28	0	100; 197
Victoria-Swan Lake	12.50; 16	25.00; 32	39.06; 50	16.41; 21	7.03; 9	0	100; 128

== See also ==
- 2026 British Columbia general election
