= Port Moody-Coquitlam =

Port Moody-Coquitlam may refer to:

- Port Moody-Coquitlam (provincial electoral district), renamed Port Moody-Burquitlam in 2024, in British Columbia, Canada
- Port Moody—Coquitlam (federal electoral district), known as Port Moody—Coquitlam—Port Coquitlam 2000–2004, in British Columbia, Canada
