= John McEwen (Canadian politician) =

Canadian politician

John McEwen MLA

Member of the Legislative Assembly for Port Moody-Burquitlam
- Incumbent
- Assumed office October 24, 2026
- Preceded by: Rick Glumac

Mayor of Anmore
- In office December 2, 2014 – November 3, 2026
- Preceded by: Heather Anderson
- Succeeded by: Doug Richardson

Personal details
- Party: Conservative

John McEwen MLA is a Canadian politician who is the Member of the British Columbia Legislative Assembly for Port Moody-Burquitlam since 2026.

McEwen was previously a councillor for Anmore before becoming Mayor for 3 terms, he also served on the Metro Vancouver Regional District Board as its Vice Chair.
