= Linda Reimer =

Canadian politician

Member of the British Columbia Legislative Assembly for Port Moody-Coquitlam
- In office May 14, 2013 – May 9, 2017
- Preceded by: Joe Trasolini
- Succeeded by: Rick Glumac

Personal details
- Born: 1959 or 1960 (age 66–67)
- Party: Liberal

Linda Reimer (born 1959 or 1960) is a Canadian politician, who was elected to the Legislative Assembly of British Columbia in the 2013 provincial election. She represented the electoral district of Port Moody-Coquitlam as a member of the British Columbia Liberal Party. In office, she served as the Parliamentary Secretary to the Minister of Community, Sport and Cultural Development for Communities.

Prior to her election to the legislature, Reimer was a member of Coquitlam City Council. She also served as a Councillor on the Council of the BC College of Teachers, the regulatory authority for the teaching profession, and was one of the 11 of 20 councillors that called for the College's independence from the influence of the BC Teachers' Federation, the teachers' union who practised a policy of open and active intervention and interference into legislated functions of that body.

== Electoral record ==
2017 British Columbia general election: Port Moody-Coquitlam
Party	Candidate	Votes	%	±%	Expenditures
New Democratic	Rick Glumac	11,754	47.69	+3.40	$64,112
Liberal	Linda Reimer	9,910	40.20	−6.18	$65,386
Green	Don Barthel	2,985	12.11	+3.92	$1,056
Total valid votes		24,649	100.00	–	
Total rejected ballots		137	0.55	−0.08	
Turnout		24,786	65.31	+6.56	
Registered voters		37,950			
Source: Elections BC

2013 British Columbia general election: Port Moody-Coquitlam
Party	Candidate	Votes	%	±%	Expenditures
Liberal	Linda Reimer	9,675	46.38	+16.08	$97,626
New Democratic	Joe Trasolini	9,238	44.29	-10.05	$130,654
Green	Billie Helps	1,708	8.19	–	$250
Libertarian	Jeff Monds	237	1.14	–	$250
Total valid votes		20,858	100.00	–	
Total rejected ballots		133	0.63	+0.24	
Turnout		20,991	58.75	26.68	
Registered voters		35,731			
Source: Elections BC
