= Peter Milobar =

Canadian politician (born 1970)

The Honourable Peter Milobar MLA
- Milobar in 2026

Minister of Finance of British Columbia
- Incumbent
- Assumed office November 20, 2026
- Premier: Lorne Doerkson
- Preceded by: Josie Osborne

Member of the British Columbia Legislative Assembly for Kamloops Centre Kamloops-North Thompson (2017–2024)
- Incumbent
- Assumed office May 9, 2017
- Preceded by: Terry Lake

Leader of CentreBC
- In office September 18, 2026 – September 22, 2026
- Preceded by: Mike Bernier
- Succeeded by: Elenore Sturko

Mayor of Kamloops
- In office December 1, 2008 – July 1, 2017
- Preceded by: Terry Lake
- Succeeded by: Ken Christian

Personal details
- Born: February 13, 1970 (age 56) Edmonton, Alberta, Canada
- Party: BC Conservative (2024–2026, 2026–present)
- Other political affiliations: BC United (2017–2024); Independent (2026); British Columbia Party (2026); CentreBC (2026)
- Spouse: Lianne Milobar
- Children: 3

Peter Gordon Milobar MLA (born February 13, 1970) is a Canadian politician who has served as a member of the Legislative Assembly of British Columbia (MLA), he has represented the electoral district of Kamloops Centre since 2024 and previously Kamloops-North Thompson from 2017 to 2024. He was first elected as a member of the BC Liberal Party (later BC United), then crossed the floor to the Conservative Party in 2024.

In August 2026, he left the Conservative Party to sit as an independent and formed a political party which was later revealed to be the British Columbia Party. On September 18, 2026, he became leader of CentreBC following the resignation of Mike Bernier. However, 4 days later, he left the party and rejoined the Conservatives.

Prior to provincial politics, he served as city councillor and mayor of Kamloops.

== Early life and career ==
Milobar was born in Edmonton, Alberta, and raised in Kamloops, British Columbia. He lives in Kamloops with his wife Lianne and their three children where they operate a small business together. Lianne is Indigenous. Previously, Milobar worked with the BC Transit Board of Directors, PRIMECorp, and the Local Government Contract Management Committee.

== Municipal politics ==
=== Kamloops City Council ===
While managing his family's Days Inn Hotel, Milobar made his first run for Kamloops City Council at the age of 32, winning his seat with 7,130 votes. Milobar ran on a platform of working to ensure Royal Inland Hospital retain its status as a referral centre with further expansion/equipment to retain and attract new doctors and nurses, and the expansion of the local tax base by encouraging further development in Kamloops. He was re-elected as a city councillor in the 2005 municipal election.

Milobar served on city council for two terms from 2002 to 2008, before being elected mayor of Kamloops in 2008.

=== Kamloops Mayor ===
On July 30, 2008, Milobar announced his plans to run for mayor in that fall's municipal election with a platform of "A Balanced Approach" to decision making, and his goals of fulfilling tournament capital commitments, upgrading the sewage treatment plant, completing the Kamloops Sustainability Plan, working with agricultural groups on a new expo space, work on affordable housing options, safety initiatives between Royal Canadian Mounted Police and By-Law staff, and to work with BC Transit for continued sustainable transit expansion.

Milobar was elected as the 39th mayor of Kamloops on November 15, 2008, receiving 3,147 ballots, or 74.13% of the total vote. He served three consecutive terms from 2008 to 2017, becoming the longest-serving mayor in the city's history. From 2006 to 2011, he also chaired the Thompson-Nicola Regional District, making him the first Kamloops mayor elected to hold that position. In 2011, Milobar was elected chair of the Thompson Regional Hospital District, a role he held until 2017.

== Provincial politics ==
=== BC Liberal/United ===
Milobar was elected in the 2017 provincial election as a member of the BC Liberal caucus (renamed BC United in 2023), representing the electoral district of the Kamloops-North Thompson. He was re-elected in 2020, winning by less than 200 votes. During this time, he served as the official opposition critic for Environment and Climate Change, and Indigenous Relations and Reconciliation. He was also the opposition House Leader until 2022, when he was instead named official opposition critic for Finance by incoming Liberal leader Kevin Falcon.

=== Conservative Party of BC ===
With BC United suspending its campaign ahead of the 2024 provincial election, Milobar instead joined the Conservative Party of British Columbia that September, running in the newly established riding of Kamloops Centre. He was re-elected in that October's provincial election, defeating New Democratic Party candidate Kamal Grewal by about 2,000 votes. In November 2024, Milobar was named to the official opposition's shadow cabinet as critic for Finance.

In February 2025, as a response to what he regards as residential school denialism emerging from his own party caucus, after Dallas Brodie tweeted controversial statements, he delivered some deeply personal comments in the legislature. He emphasized his background and the fact that his wife and his kids are all Indigenous, and his son-in-law is a Tk'emlúps band member. He also reaffirmed his commitment to pushing back against denialism recognizing that he would do this knowing that his comments would not be welcome in all spaces including his own party. He did concede that it was difficult for the Conservative caucus to navigate this divisive topic, but when confronted with it in his own party he pushed back and did not remain silent.

Milobar announced his campaign to replace John Rustad as leader of the Conservative Party of BC on January 16, 2026. The results were announced on May 30; Milobar was eliminated from the race after finishing last in the first ballot with 10.5% of the vote.

=== Independent/British Columbia Party ===
On August 14, 2026, Milobar announced his decision to leave the BC Conservative caucus, saying that "his values don't align with the new leader". During the leadership campaign, Kerry-Lynne Findlay faced criticism within her own party for saying Milobar had a conflict of interest when it comes to reconciliation because his wife is Indigenous. In response, he called Findlay's attacks "the worst side of politics possible", suggesting her victory would "give a lot of British Columbians pause for thought of whether they would actually vote for a party like this". Findlay had appointed Milobar as her finance critic in her shadow cabinet weeks prior. On August 24, Ian Paton also left the Conservative caucus and announced that he and Milobar would be founding a new party with Milobar as interim leader. In September 2026, fellow Conservative defectors Bruce Banman, Áʼa꞉líya Warbus, and Rosalyn Bird announced they would join Paton and Milobar in forming a new party.

After joining CentreBC, the political party Milobar created was officially registered with Elections BC as the "British Columbia Party" on September 22, 2026. Although Milobar had joined CentreBC and later rejoined the Conservatives, the party remains registered with Milobar listed as the leader.

=== CentreBC ===
On September 18, 2026, Milobar announced that he would be taking over as leader of CentreBC, a party founded in 2025 and most recently led by former MLA Mike Bernier. Seven MLAs (Note: Paton, Banman, Warbus, Bird, Teresa Wat, Elenore Sturko, and Donegal Wilson.) since joined Milobar's CentreBC caucus. Four days later, however, after Premier David Eby called a snap election, he rejoined the BC Conservative caucus.

== Electoral history ==
=== Provincial elections ===
2026 British Columbia general election: Kamloops Centre
Party	Candidate	Votes	%	±%	Expenditures
Conservative	Peter Milobar	12,414	52.94		
New Democratic	Mike Wisla	7,220	30.79		
Green	Annelise Beach	2,658	11.34		
OneBC	Rocky McAfee	865	3.69	—	
Independent	Thaelo Proctor	263	1.12	—	
Total valid votes		23,420	99.88		
Total rejected ballots		28	0.12		
Turnout		23,448			
Registered voters					
Conservative hold		Swing		+7.41	
Source: Elections BC

2024 British Columbia general election: Kamloops Centre
Party	Candidate	Votes	%	±%	Expenditures
Conservative	Peter Milobar	12,372	48.83	+45.8	$39,481.01
New Democratic	Kamal Grewal	10,369	40.92	+0.4	$29,552.54
Green	Randy Sunderman	2,597	10.25	-5.5	$18,047.46
Total valid votes/expense limit		25,338	99.86	–	$71,700.08
Total rejected ballots		36	0.14	–	
Turnout		25,374	57.59	–	
Registered voters		44,059			
Conservative notional gain from BC United		Swing		N/A (Note: Swing cannot be calculated as BC United did not run a candidate in this riding.)	
Source: Elections BC

2020 British Columbia general election: Kamloops-North Thompson
Party	Candidate	Votes	%	±%	Expenditures
Liberal	Peter Milobar	9,341	40.99	−7.33	$59,084.81
New Democratic	Sadie Hunter	9,145	40.13	+9.78	$18,663.02
Green	Thomas Martin	2,224	9.76	−10.80	$9,496.78
Conservative	Dennis Giesbrecht	1,928	8.46	–	$2,954.19
Independent	Brandon Russell	149	0.65	–	$995.20
Total valid votes		22,787	100.00	–	
Total rejected ballots					
Turnout					
Registered voters					
Source: Elections BC

2017 British Columbia general election: Kamloops-North Thompson
Party	Candidate	Votes	%	±%	Expenditures
Liberal	Peter Milobar	12,001	48.32	−3.74	$47,484
New Democratic	Barb Nederpel	7,538	30.35	−8.7	$68,758
Green	Dan Hines	5,111	20.58	–	$17,164
Communist	Peter Paul Kerek	187	0.75	–	
Total valid votes		24,837	100.00		
Total rejected ballots		200	0.80		
Turnout		25,037	60.34		
Source: Elections BC

=== Leadership elections ===
= Eliminated from next round
= Winner

Candidate	Ballot 1		Ballot 2		Ballot 3		Ballot 4	
Name	Votes	Points	Votes	Points	Votes	Points	Votes	Points
Kerry-Lynne Findlay	7,583 29.9%	2806.42 30.5%	7,844 30.9%	2961.53 32.2%	9,050 35.7%	3559.78 38.6%	10,907 43.0%	4696.51 51.0%
Caroline Elliott	6,760 26.7%	2374.14 25.8%	7,393 29.2%	2638.74 28.6%	7,800 30.76%	2883.71 31.3%	10,847 42.8%	4514.49 49.0%
Iain Black	4,902 19.3%	1865.82 20.3%	6,077 24.0%	2328.21 25.3%	6971 27.5%	2767.51 30.0%	Eliminated	
Yuri Fulmer	3,163 12.5%	1193.27 13.0%	3,344 13.2%	1282.52 13.9%	Eliminated			
Peter Milobar	2,893 11.4%	971.34 10.5%	Eliminated					
Total Valid	25,301	9211.0	24,658	9211.0	23,821	9211.0	21,754	9211.0
Abstain / exhausted	58 0.2%	n/a	701 2.8%	n/a	1538 6.1%	n/a	3,605 14.2%	n/a
