= Iain Black =

Canadian politician and business executive

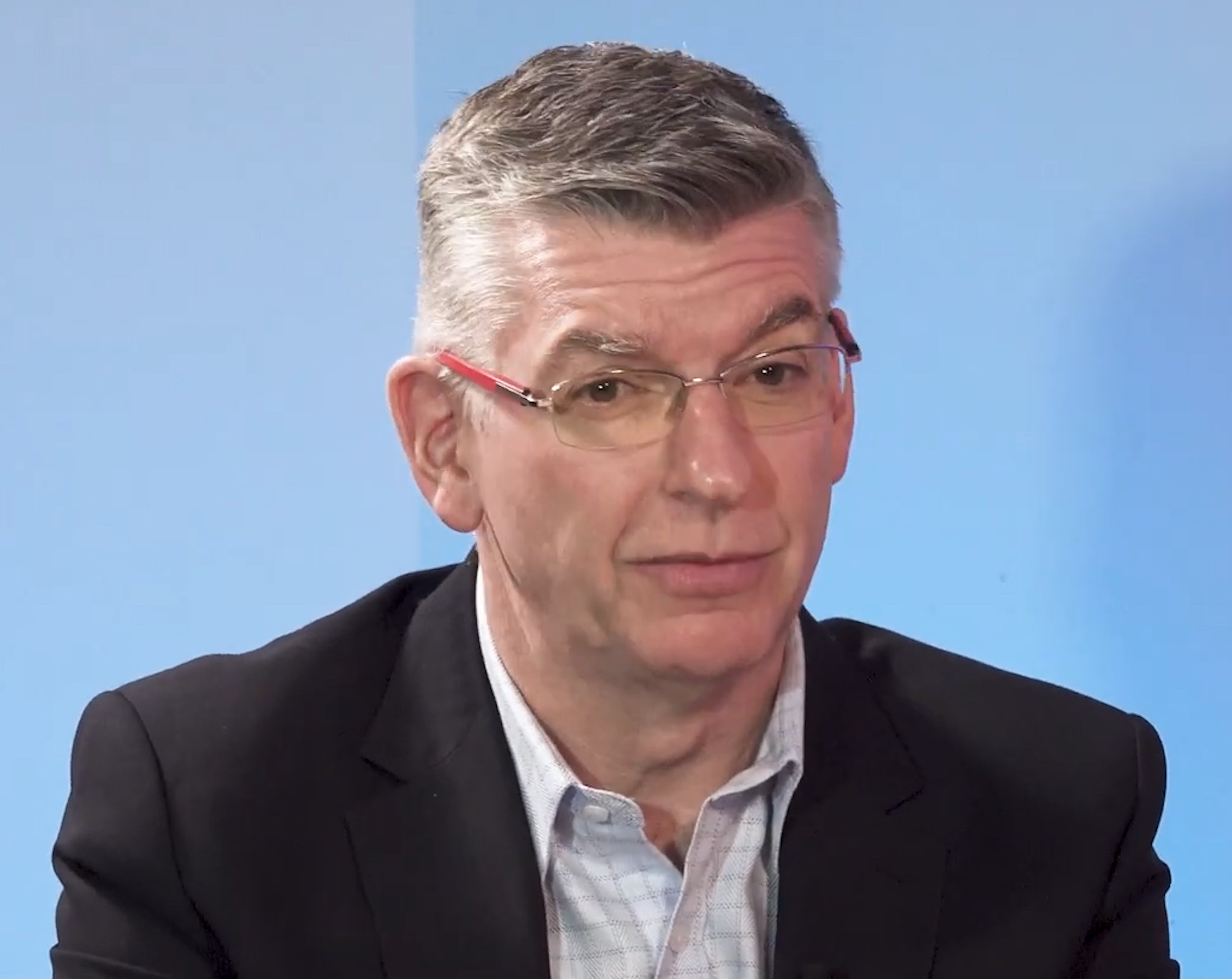
- Black in 2025

Minister of Labour of British Columbia
- In office October 25, 2010 – March 23, 2011
- Premier: Gordon Campbell
- Preceded by: Murray Coell
- Succeeded by: Stephanie Cadieux

Minister of Small Business, Technology and Economic Development of British Columbia
- In office June 10, 2009 – October 25, 2010
- Premier: Gordon Campbell
- Preceded by: Ida Chong
- Succeeded by: Colin Hansen (Small Business)

Minister of Labour and Citizens Services of British Columbia
- In office June 23, 2008 – June 10, 2009
- Premier: Gordon Campbell
- Preceded by: Olga Ilich
- Succeeded by: Murray Coell

Member of the British Columbia Legislative Assembly for Port Moody-Coquitlam Port Moody-Westwood (2005–2009)
- In office May 17, 2005 – October 3, 2011
- Preceded by: Christy Clark
- Succeeded by: Joe Trasolini

Personal details
- Born: Iain James Stewart Black; December 20, 1967 (age 58) Winnipeg, Manitoba, Canada
- Party: BC Conservative (provincial); Conservative (federal)
- Other political affiliations: BC Liberal
- Spouse: Chris Torch (m. 1994)
- Children: 3
- Education: University of Manitoba (BComm)

Iain James Stewart Black (born 1967) is a Canadian politician and business executive who served as a member of the Legislative Assembly of British Columbia (MLA) from 2005 to 2011, representing Port Moody-Westwood and later Port Moody-Coquitlam as part of the British Columbia Liberal Party caucus. He served in cabinet under Premier Gordon Campbell as Minister of Labour and Citizens' Services from 2008 to 2009, as Minister of Small Business, Technology and Economic Development from 2009 to 2010, and as Minister of Labour from 2010 to 2011.

Black resigned from the legislature in 2011 to join the Greater Vancouver Board of Trade as president and CEO, serving until 2019. He ran as the Conservative Party of Canada candidate for the riding of Coquitlam—Port Coquitlam in the 2025 federal election, and contested the 2026 Conservative Party of British Columbia leadership election, but was unsuccessful in both attempts.

== Early life and family ==
Black was born in 1967 in Winnipeg, Manitoba. He holds an honours degree in business from the University of Manitoba, and the ICD.D designation from the University of Toronto's Rotman School of Management. He moved to British Columbia in 1994 after marrying his partner Chris; they raised their three children in the Westwood Plateau neighbourhood of Coquitlam.

== Business career (1995–2005) ==
Black spent most of his professional career in the technology sector, where he held senior management and executive roles prior to and following his time in public office. He began his career with IBM Canada Ltd., working in sales and marketing. In 1995, he founded E-Z Net, a company that provided services to Internet service providers during the early growth of commercial internet access. He then joined Axion Communications as vice-president of corporate sales, later becoming chief operating officer. He became president and chief executive officer of The Electric Mail Company Inc. in 1999, later serving as a director, during a period in which the company expanded its business email services.

He went on to serve as president of the Banking Solutions Group at Open Solutions Canada (formerly Datawest Solutions Inc.), a provider of banking systems and outsourcing services for Canadian credit unions. Black was part of the senior management team involved in the merger between Open Solutions and Datawest Solutions, prior to his election to the Legislative Assembly in 2005.

== Political career (2005–2011) ==
Black was first elected to the Legislative Assembly of British Columbia in the 2005 provincial election as a BC Liberal candidate, succeeding Christy Clark in the electoral district of Port Moody-Westwood. During his time in the legislature, Black served in several parliamentary and cabinet-related roles, including as member of the British Columbia Treasury Board. He also chaired the Select Standing Committee to Appoint a Conflict of Interest Commissioner and, in December 2006, was appointed chair of the Government Caucus Committee on Natural Resources and the Economy, which reviews legislation and provides recommendations to cabinet.

Prior to his appointment to cabinet, Black was the lead architect for the 2007 legislation that made booster seats mandatory for children between the ages of four and nine, or until reaching a height of 4 ft 9 in (140 cm). He also led the International Business Hosting Program for the 2010 Winter Olympic and Paralympic Winter Games.

He was named Minister of Labour and Citizens' Services in June 2008, replacing Olga Ilich. After winning re-election in 2009 for the redistributed riding of Port Moody–Coquitlam, Black was re-assigned as Minister of Small Business, Technology and Economic Development. With the Liberals losing support following the introduction of the harmonized sales tax, Premier Gordon Campbell shuffled his cabinet in October 2010, with Black once again handling the labour portfolio.

Campbell announced his resignation as premier and BC Liberal leader in November 2010; Black supported Kevin Falcon in the ensuing leadership election. He was excluded from cabinet after Christy Clark was sworn in as premier in March 2011, and was instead named parliamentary secretary for public transportation.

== Return to business (2011–2025) ==
Black resigned as MLA in October 2011 to become president and chief executive officer of the Vancouver Board of Trade. During his tenure, the organization eliminated its operating deficit and underwent internal restructuring, and re-branded as the Greater Vancouver Board of Trade (GVBOT) in 2016. It also expanded its programming and membership base, and by 2015 its board of directors included more women than men, a distinction among major Canadian business organizations at the time. The organization hosted more than 1,000 events during Black's leadership.

Under Black's leadership, the GVBOT took public positions on a range of economic and policy issues. The organization supported increasing Canada's access to international oil markets, including through the Trans Mountain Pipeline expansion. In 2018, the GVBOT organized a delegation of supporters to Alberta to demonstrate support for pipeline development. The organization also publicly opposed proposed federal tax changes affecting small businesses in 2017, which were later modified by the federal government.

After leaving GVBOT in April 2019, Black returned to the technology sector. In 2019, he was appointed president and chief executive officer of Maximizer Software, a company within the Concord Group of Companies, and later served as vice chair and board advisor to the Concord Group. In 2025, he founded Black Ink Advisory, an advisory firm providing guidance in executive leadership and governance, operational effectiveness and strategy development.

== Reentry into politics (2024–2026) ==
=== 2025 federal election ===
In 2024, Black announced his candidacy for the Conservative Party of Canada in the riding of Coquitlam—Port Coquitlam. In the 2025 Canadian federal election, he was defeated by incumbent Liberal MP Ron McKinnon.

=== 2026 BC Conservative leadership election ===
In January 2026, Black announced his candidacy for the leadership of the Conservative Party of British Columbia. The results were announced on May 30; Black was eliminated from the race after finishing last in the third ballot with 30% of the vote.

== Community and business involvement ==
- Member, Conservative Party of Canada National Economic Growth Council (2025), an advisory body focused on economic policy development.
- Member, Chair’s Council, Science World British Columbia (2017–2024).
- Chancellor, Vancouver School of Theology (2018–2022).
- Judge, Business in Vancouver Forty Under 40 Awards (2014–2017).
- Coach, North Coquitlam United Soccer Club (2004–2010).
- Board director, Canuck Place Children's Hospice (1999–2005).

== Accolades ==
- “Executive of the Year” (2015) – Canadian Chamber of Commerce.
- Business in Vancouver Top 40 Under 40 award.

== Electoral history ==
=== Leadership ===
= Eliminated from next round
= Winner

Candidate	Ballot 1		Ballot 2		Ballot 3		Ballot 4	
Name	Votes	Points	Votes	Points	Votes	Points	Votes	Points
Kerry-Lynne Findlay	7,583 29.9%	2806.42 30.5%	7,844 30.9%	2961.53 32.2%	9,050 35.7%	3559.78 38.6%	10,907 43.0%	4696.51 51.0%
Caroline Elliott	6,760 26.7%	2374.14 25.8%	7,393 29.2%	2638.74 28.6%	7,800 30.76%	2883.71 31.3%	10,847 42.8%	4514.49 49.0%
Iain Black	4,902 19.3%	1865.82 20.3%	6,077 24.0%	2328.21 25.3%	6971 27.5%	2767.51 30.0%	Eliminated	
Yuri Fulmer	3,163 12.5%	1193.27 13.0%	3,344 13.2%	1282.52 13.9%	Eliminated			
Peter Milobar	2,893 11.4%	971.34 10.5%	Eliminated					
Total Valid	25,301	9211.0	24,658	9211.0	23,821	9211.0	21,754	9211.0
Abstain / exhausted	58 0.2%	n/a	701 2.8%	n/a	1538 6.1%	n/a	3,605 14.2%	n/a

=== Federal ===
2025 Canadian federal election: Coquitlam—Port Coquitlam
Party	Candidate	Votes	%	±%	Expenditures
Liberal	Ron McKinnon	27,250	47.37	+9.45	$99,370.86
Conservative	Iain Black	24,730	42.99	+12.87	$125,978.48
New Democratic	Laura Dupont	4,253	7.39	–20.21	$55,430.60
Libertarian	Lewis Clarke Dahlby	785	1.37	–	none listed
Green	Michael Peter Glenister	504	0.88	–	none listed
Total valid votes/expense limit		57,522	99.50	–	$129,262.73
Total rejected ballots		287	0.50	–0.22	
Turnout		57,809	69.42	+9.59	
Eligible voters		83,272			
Liberal notional hold		Swing		–1.71	
Source: Elections Canada

=== Provincial ===
2009 British Columbia general election: Port Moody-Coquitlam
Party	Candidate	Votes	%	Expenditures
Liberal	Iain Black	9,979	52.15	$92,290
New Democratic	Shannon Watkins	7,614	39.80	$76,297
Green	Rebecca Helps	1,261	6.59	$1,048
Your Political Party	James Filippelli	198	1.03	$775
Refederation	Donna Vandekerkhove	82	0.43	$260
Total valid votes		19,134	100	
Total rejected ballots		102	0.53	
Turnout		19,236	57.44	
Registered voters		33,487		
Source: Elections BC

2005 British Columbia general election: Port Moody-Westwood
Party	Candidate	Votes	%	Expenditures
Liberal	Iain Black	14,161	53.75	$105,019
New Democratic	Karen Rockwell	9,848	37.38	$59,981
Green	Kathy Heisler	1,670	6.34	$200
Your Political Party	James Filippelli	442	1.68	$710
Independent	Arthur Crossman	227	0.85	$125
Total valid votes		26,348	100	
Total rejected ballots		128	0.49	
Turnout		26,476	60.57	
Registered voters		43,715		
Source: Elections BC
