= Your Political Party of British Columbia =

Provincial political party in Canada

- Defunct provincial party
- Leader: James Filippelli
- President: Sarah Husain
- Founded: June 6, 2002
- Dissolved: September 19, 2024
- Headquarters: 313 – 2040 York Avenue; Vancouver, British Columbia; V6J 1E7
- Ideology: Open government
- Seats in the Legislative Assembly: 0 / 93

Your Political Party of British Columbia, or simply Your Party, was a minor political party in British Columbia, Canada. The party was registered with Elections BC and participated in the 2005, 2009, 2013, and 2017 general elections. The party advocated for more transparency and accountability in government. It nominated one candidate in 2005, two in 2009 and 2013, and 10 in 2017. No Your Party candidate was ever elected to office. Its best result was a fourth-place finish with 442 votes (1.68%) in Port Moody-Westwood in 2005.

== History ==
Your Political Party of BC was registered with Elections BC on June 6, 2002, by Belcarra-resident James Filippelli. In February 2005, Filippelli announced he would seek election in the electoral district of Port Moody-Westwood as a Your Political Party of BC candidate during the May 2005 provincial election. At the time, in addition to being the party president and leader, Filippelli was a 22-year-old student at Douglas College. Filippelli ran on a limited platform centred on government accountability to taxpayers. He advocated more detailed and open budget process so that every expenditure is disclosed while at the same time reducing bureaucracy and taxes. He also advocated for elected Members of the Legislative Assembly to return 10% of their wages back to constituents. Filippelli came in fourth place in the Port Moody-Westwood riding, losing to Iain Black of the BC Liberal Party.

As the May 2009 provincial election approached, Your Political Party announced it would nominate two candidates: Brent Williams in the Port Coquitlam electoral district and Filippelli in Port Moody-Coquitlam. By this time Filippelli was a 26-year-old electrician living in Port Moody. In addition to campaigning for more government transparency regarding financial issues, the two candidates also supported keeping the carbon tax and eliminating the property transfer tax Filippelli again came in fourth place in his riding losing to Iain Black, while Williams came in fifth in his riding losing to Mike Farnworth of the New Democratic Party.

It nominated ten candidates in the 2017 provincial election, none of whom was elected. It did not nominate any candidates in the 2020 provincial election.

The party voluntarily deregistered with Elections BC on September 19, 2024.

== Party platform ==
- The provincial budget would be made public, so that the province's residents could see where their tax dollars were going.
- All government actions would be public, including how each MLA (Member of the Legislative Assembly) votes on each issue.
- More information would be provided to British Columbians, so that they can be more informed and interested in the government and be able to provide knowledgeable feedback about what they would like the government to do.
- All YPP MLAs would give at least 10% of their take-home salary back to their constituency, and would hold a meeting once every month open to all members of the constituency to inform them about what is happening in the legislature. These meetings will give the people of each constituency a chance to let each MLA know how they feel about what is happening in the legislature and with their tax dollars.
- All government actions and legislation should be sustainable. Everything the government does should be economically sustainable, environmentally sustainable, and socially sustainable.
- Two-way communication between the BC government and the people would be facilitated by an online website giving every British Columbian a secure login to provide feedback on what they would like to see for the future of BC.
- Questionnaires with pre-paid postage would be made available at all government buildings so that British Columbians can inform government about the things they would like the government to do.
- All of the votes in the BC legislature would be "free votes", i.e., MLAs would not have to vote along party lines, so that MLAs would be able to better represent the people of their constituencies by voting the way the majority of their constituents would like them to vote.

== Electoral results ==
The party's leader, James Filippelli, stood unsuccessfully as a candidate for election to the Legislative Assembly of British Columbia in the riding of Port Moody-Westwood in the 2005 provincial election.

Election	Candidates	Total votes	Popular vote	Riding	Candidate	Votes	Popular vote in riding
2005	1	442	0.03%				
2005	1	442	0.03%	Port Moody-Westwood	James Filippelli	442	1.68%
2009	2	335	0.02%				
2009	2	335	0.02%	Port Moody-Coquitlam	James Filippelli	198	1.03%
2009	2	335	0.02%	Port Coquitlam	Brent Williams	137	0.67%
2013	2	528	0.03%				
2013	2	528	0.03%	Vancouver-False Creek	James Filippelli	81	0.37%
2013	2	528	0.03%	Port Coquitlam	Brent Williams	447	2.01%
2017	10	1,036	0.06%				
2017	10	1,036	0.06%	Vancouver-Fairview	Joey Doyle	131	0.5%
2017	10	1,036	0.06%	Vancouver-False Creek	James Filippelli	96	0.44%
2017	10	1,036	0.06%	Vancouver-Fraserview	Harpreet S. Bajwa	156	0.74%
2017	10	1,036	0.06%	Vancouver-Kensington	Ramanjit Kaur Dhillon	167	0.84%
2017	10	1,036	0.06%	Vancouver-Kingsway	Brette Mullins	76	0.43%
2017	10	1,036	0.06%	Vancouver-Langara	Surinder Singh Trehan	156	0.81%
2017	10	1,036	0.06%	Vancouver-Mount Pleasant	Shai Joseph Mor	67	0.32%
2017	10	1,036	0.06%	Vancouver-Point Grey	David Stall	60	0.27%
2017	10	1,036	0.06%	Surrey-Green Timbers	Kanwaljit Singh Moti	66	0.46%
2017	10	1,036	0.06%	Surrey South	Fabiola Cecilia Palomino	61	0.25%

== Finances ==
Annual Financial Report
Year	Income	Expenses	Assets	Reference
2002	$325	$334	$27	
2003	$407	$378	$147	
2004	$775	$542	$335	
2005	$1,095	$1,509	$66	
2006	$40	$263	$87	
2007	$700	$5	$332	
2008	$125	$541	$199	
2009	$2,205	$2,541	$145	
2010	$1,352	$560	$608	

Election Expenses
Election	Income	Expenses	Surplus/Deficit	Reference
2005	$815	$827	($12)	
2009	$2,105	$2,291	($186)	

== See also ==
- List of political parties in British Columbia
