= 2011 British Columbia Liberal Party leadership election =

Canadian provincial party election

- February 26, 2011
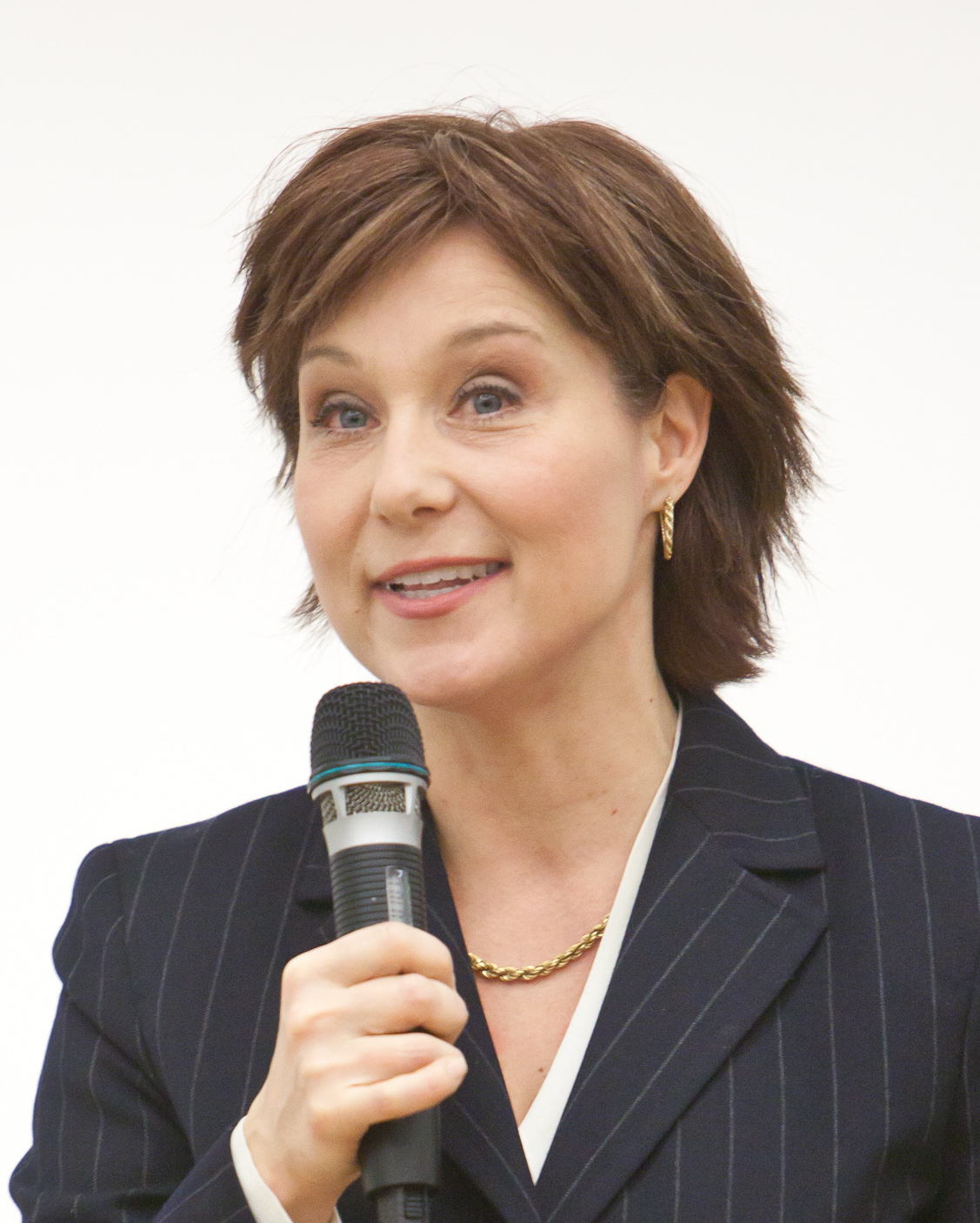

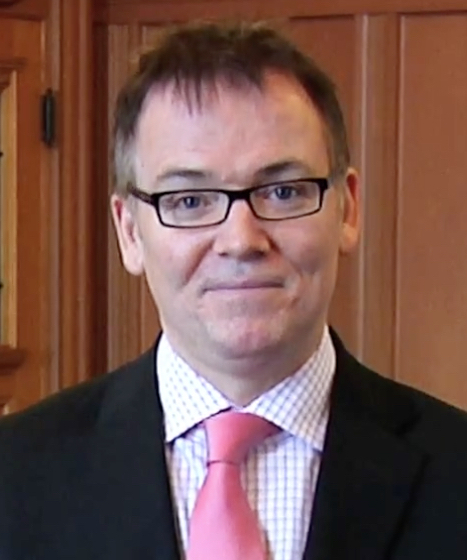

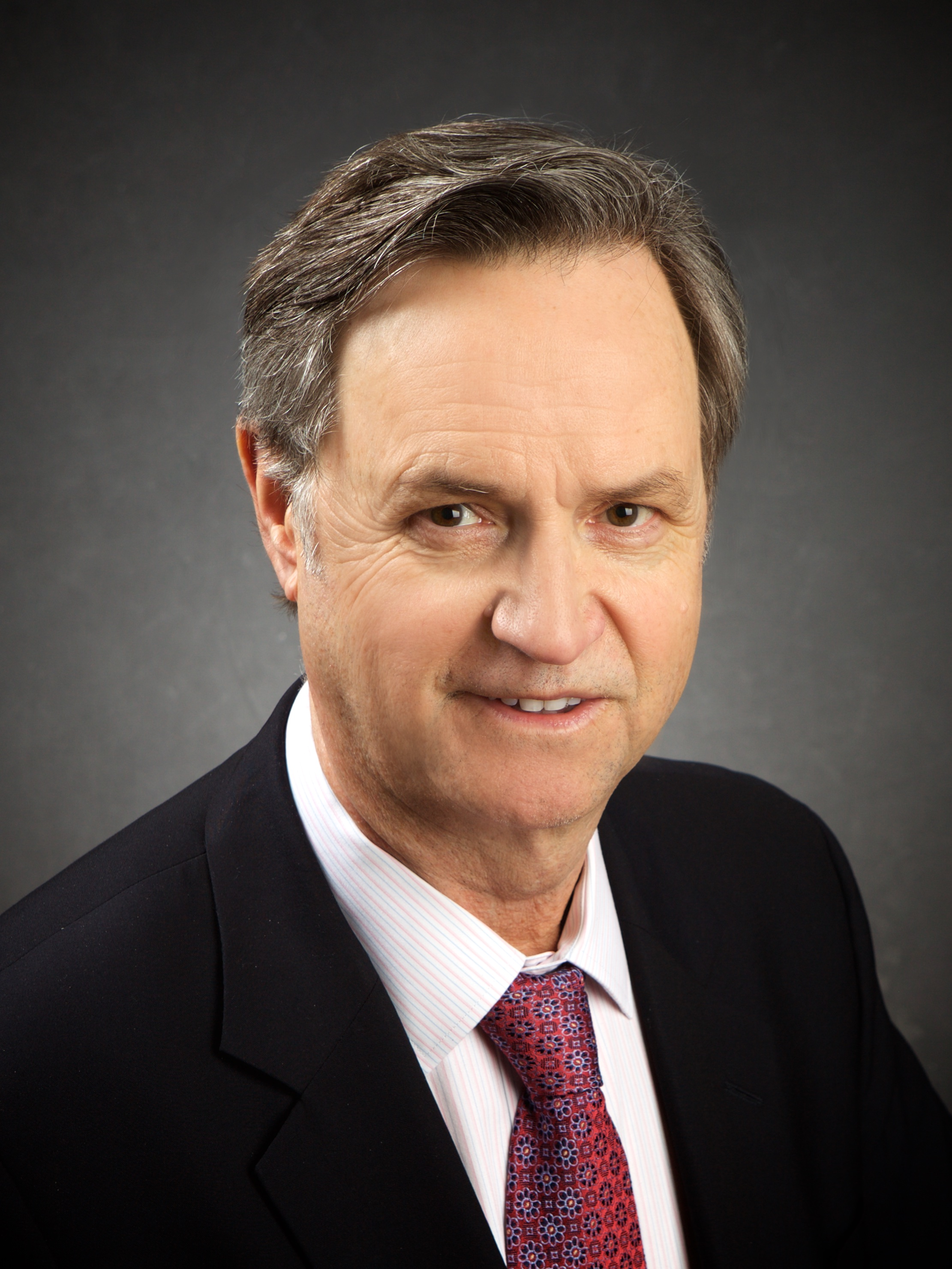
Candidate	Christy Clark	Kevin Falcon	George Abbott
Third ballot points	4,420 (52.0%)	4,080 (48.0%)	Eliminated
Second ballot points	3,575 (42.06%)	2,564 (30.16%)	2,361 (27.78%)
First ballot points	3,209 (37.75%)	2,411 (28.36%)	2,091 (24.60%)
Leader before election
Gordon Campbell
Elected Leader
Christy Clark

2011 British Columbia Liberal Party leadership election
- Date: February 26, 2011
- Convention: Vancouver Convention Centre
- Resigning leader: Gordon Campbell
- Won by: Christy Clark
- Ballots: 3
- Candidates: 4
- Entrance fee: $25,000
- Spending limit: $450,000

The 2011 British Columbia Liberal Party leadership election was held following Gordon Campbell's resignation as Premier of British Columbia and as leader of the British Columbia Liberal Party.

The convention elected Christy Clark, who had served as Deputy Premier of British Columbia from 2001 to 2004, as the party's new leader on February 26, 2011. Clark ultimately won the leadership on the third ballot over former Minister of Health Kevin Falcon with 52% of the vote.

== Background ==
Campbell, who had previously served as mayor of Vancouver from 1986 to 1993, had served as leader of the BC Liberal Party since 1993. Under Campbell, the party won a majority in the 2001 general election, and was reelected with smaller majorities in 2005 and 2009.

Gordon Campbell's announced his resignation as Premier and as party leader on November 3, 2010. Upon his announcement, he asked the party to hold the election "at the earliest possible date".

=== Status of the leadership until the convention ===
Upon announcing his resignation, Gordon Campbell did not state whether he would stay on as premier and party leader until a new leader was chosen, or whether an interim leader would fill this role.

However, Campbell soon made it clear that he would be staying on until a new leader was elected. "A smooth and orderly transition doesn't mean you have two or three leaders in a period of two or three months. So I'll be premier until the party selects a new leader. The new leader will then be sworn in as premier, and there will be a smooth and orderly transition."

== Voting rules ==
On November 13, 2010, the Provincial Executive of the BC Liberal Party voted unanimously to call an extraordinary convention to approve new rules for the Party's leadership vote process. The "preferential ballot system" recommended by the Provincial Executive gives each party member a vote and then adjusts the results according to a regionally-weighted point system to ensure that each riding association counts equally. The first candidate to receive more than 50% of the regionally-weighted points in province-wide round of voting would emerge as the next Leader of the BC Liberal Party. These recommendations were approved by two-thirds of delegates at an extraordinary convention held on February 12, 2011.

== Declared candidates ==
The following candidates declared their intention to run for the leadership:

=== George Abbott ===
MLA for Shuswap (since 1996), Minister of Community, Aboriginal and Women's Services (2001–04), Minister of Sustainable Resource Management (2004–05), Minister of Health (2005–09), Minister of Aboriginal Relations and Reconciliation (2009–10), Minister of Education (2010).

Support from caucus members: Donna Barnett (Cariboo-Chilcotin), Murray Coell (Saanich North and the Islands), Eric Foster (Vernon-Monashee), Randy Hawes (Abbotsford-Mission), Kash Heed (Vancouver-Fraserview), Gordon Hogg (Surrey-White Rock), Kevin Krueger (Kamloops-South Thompson), Terry Lake (Kamloops-North Thompson), Richard Lee (Burnaby North), Norm Letnick (Kelowna-Lake Country), Mary McNeil (Vancouver-False Creek), Don McRae (Comox Valley), John Rustad (Nechako Lakes), Moira Stilwell (Vancouver-Langara), Ralph Sultan (West Vancouver-Capilano), John Slater (Boundary-Similkameen), Steve Thomson (Kelowna-Mission), Jane Thornthwaite (North Vancouver-Seymour) John van Dongen (Abbotsford South), Naomi Yamamoto (North Vancouver-Lonsdale)
Support from former caucus members: Bill Bennett (East Kootenay), Bill Belsey (North Coast), Tom Christensen (Okanagan-Vernon), Greg Halsey-Brandt (Richmond Centre), Harold Long (Powell River-Sunshine Coast), Sandy Santori (West Kootenay-Boundary), Ken Stewart (Maple Ridge-Pitt Meadows), Katherine Whittred (North Vancouver-Lonsdale)
Date campaign launched: November 25, 2010
Policies: New tax credits for home renovations and health and wellness expenses and moving the HST referendum to an earlier date, holding a referendum on whether to freeze the carbon tax, hold public consultation on reviewing the minimum wage and training wage, creation of 3 new groups (Premier's Council on Resource Development, Northern Development Agency, and Major Projects Secretariat) to accelerate resource development in northern BC, move funding for arts and culture back to 2008–09 levels, and legislate child poverty reduction targets.

=== Christy Clark ===
Former MLA for Port Moody-Westwood (1996–2005), Deputy Premier (2001–04), Minister of Education (2001–04), Minister of Children and Family Development (2004).

Support from caucus members: Harry Bloy (Burnaby-Lougheed)
Support from former caucus members: Tony Bhullar (Surrey-Newton), Walt Cobb (Cariboo South), Arnie Hamilton (Esquimalt-Metchosin), Roger Harris (Skeena), Mike Hunter (Nanaimo), Ken Johnston (Vancouver-Fraserview), Brenda Locke (Surrey-Green Timbers), Karn Manhas (Port Coquitlam-Burke Mountain), Lorne Mayencourt (Vancouver-Burrard), Wendy McMahon (Columbia River-Revelstoke), Paul Nettleton (Prince George-Omineca), Sheila Orr (Victoria-Hillside), Blair Suffredine (Nelson-Creston), Gillian Trumper (Alberni-Qualicum), Rod Visser (North Island)
Date campaign launched: December 8, 2010
Policies: Hosting open town hall meetings, debating more private member bills, and forming a Caucus Accountability Committee, reverse cuts to the Community Gaming Grants and review the funding formula for gambling grants, establish the third Monday in February as a statutory holiday, redirect proceeds from tobacco taxes to pay for nicotine replacement therapies and cessation products, and establish an Office of the Municipal Auditor General to monitor local government taxation.

=== Mike de Jong ===
MLA for Abbotsford West (since 1994), Attorney General and Government House Leader (2009–10), Minister of Public Safety and Solicitor General, Minister of Aboriginal Relations and Reconciliation

Support from former caucus members: Gulzar Cheema (Surrey-Panorama Ridge), Patty Sahota (Burnaby-Edmonds)
Date campaign launched: December 1, 2010
Policies: Increasing the minimum wage after public consultation, moving the HST referendum to an earlier date, lowering the voting age to 16, a reduced number of cabinet ministers and parliamentary secretaries and a reduced Office of Premier, online postings of MLA expenses, and extending the Victoria International Airport runway for non-stop international flights.

=== Kevin Falcon ===
MLA for Surrey-Cloverdale (since 2001), Minister of Transportation (2004–09), Minister of Health Services (2009–10)

Support from caucus members: Pat Bell (Prince George-Mackenzie), Iain Black (Port Moody-Westwood), Shirley Bond (Prince George-Valemount), Stephanie Cadieux (Surrey-Panorama), Ron Cantelon (Parksville-Qualicum), Ida Chong (Oak Bay-Gordon Head), Rich Coleman (Fort Langley-Aldergrove), Marc Dalton (Maple Ridge-Mission), Colin Hansen (Vancouver-Quilchena), Dave Hayer (Surrey-Tynehead), Douglas Horne (Coquitlam-Burke Mountain), Rob Howard (Richmond Centre), John Les (Chilliwack), Margaret MacDiarmid (Vancouver-Fairview), Joan McIntyre (West Vancouver-Sea to Sky), Pat Pimm (Peace River North), Mary Polak (Langley), Ben Stewart (Westside-Kelowna), John Yap (Richmond-Steveston)
Support from former caucus members: Richard Neufeld (Peace River North), Patrick Wong (Vancouver-Kensington)
Date campaign launched: November 30, 2010
Policies: 12-point public safety platform which includes giving municipality 50% of proceeds-of-crime, requiring pawnshop and scrap metal dealers to report all purchases to police, and expanding the Meth Watch program, extending the rural and oil/gas road building programs, merit pay for teachers, additional language options in schools, and freezing the carbon tax after 2012.

== Results ==
Results of the leadership election. First preference votes by riding are shown on the left side, the final redistributed votes are shown on the right side. Click to expand.

The rounds were counted in terms of points, with 100 points allocated per electoral district.

Candidate	First round		Second round		Third round	
Candidate	Points	%	Points	%	Points	%
Christy Clark	3,209	37.75	3,575	42.06	4,420	52.0
Kevin Falcon	2,411	28.36	2,564	30.16	4,080	48.0
George Abbott	2,091	24.60	2,361	27.78		
Mike de Jong	789	9.28				
Total	8,500	100.00	8,500	100.00	8,500	100.0

Riding	First Ballot				Second Ballot			Third Ballot	
Riding	Clark	Falcon	Abbott	de Jong	Clark (growth)	Falcon (growth)	Abbott (growth)	Clark (growth)	Falcon (growth)
Total	3209.7	2411.1	2090.2	789	3574.6 (364.9)	2564.6 (153.5)	2360.6 (270.4)	4420.2 (845.6)	4079.9 (1515.3)
801:Abbotsford South; MLA: John van Dongen (supported Abbott)	29.1	13.6	22.6	34.8	44.6 (15.5)	25.9 (12.3)	29.5 (6.9)	56.5 (11.9)	43.5 (17.6)
802:Abbotsford West; MLA: Mike de Jong	32.3	27.9	8	31.9	46.3 (14)	38.5 (10.6)	15.3 (7.3)	52.5 (6.2)	47.5 (9)
803:Abbotsford-Mission; MLA: Randy Hawes (supported Abbott)	32.5	23.5	19.8	24.2	38.9 (6.4)	32.9 (9.4)	28.1 (8.3)	49.4 (10.5)	50.6 (17.7)
804:Alberni-Pacific Rim	54.3	13	29.3	3.3	54.9 (0.6)	13.6 (0.6)	31.5 (2.2)	68.8 (13.9)	31.3 (17.7)
805:Boundary-Similkameen; MLA: John Slater (supported Abbott)	40.4	16	29.4	14.2	47.8 (7.4)	18.6 (2.6)	33.6 (4.2)	64.7 (16.9)	35.3 (16.7)
806:Burnaby North; MLA: Richard Lee (supported Abbott)	36	33.5	17.5	13	47 (11)	34.6 (1.1)	18.5 (1)	54.4 (7.4)	45.6 (11)
807:Burnaby-Deer Lake	41.1	34.3	13.2	11.4	49 (7.9)	36.7 (2.4)	14.4 (1.2)	54.2 (5.2)	45.8 (9.1)
808:Burnaby-Edmonds	35.9	35.7	6.6	21.8	51.5 (15.6)	38.7 (3)	9.8 (3.2)	54.5 (3)	45.5 (6.8)
809:Burnaby-Lougheed; MLA: Harry Bloy (supported Clark)	49.5	32.3	9.6	8.6	55.3 (5.8)	33.1 (0.8)	11.6 (2)	59.1 (3.8)	40.9 (7.8)
810:Cariboo North	37.5	22.7	35.1	4.7	40.3 (2.8)	22.7 (0)	37 (1.9)	50.7 (10.4)	49.3 (26.6)
811:Cariboo-Chilcotin; MLA: Donna Barnett (supported Abbott)	39.9	13.9	41.7	4.5	42.2 (2.3)	14.7 (0.8)	43.1 (1.4)	54.5 (12.3)	45.5 (30.8)
812:Chilliwack; MLA: John Les (supported Falcon)	27.2	39.2	25	8.5	29.4 (2.2)	44 (4.8)	26.6 (1.6)	33.8 (4.4)	66.2 (22.2)
813:Chilliwack-Hope; MLA: Barry Penner (remained neutral)	29.2	36	28.9	5.9	32.6 (3.4)	37.9 (1.9)	29.5 (0.6)	42.6 (10)	57.4 (19.5)
814:Columbia River-Revelstoke	12	15.9	68.9	3.2	13.9 (1.9)	16.3 (0.4)	69.7 (0.8)	24.7 (10.8)	75.3 (59)
815:Comox Valley; MLA: Don McRae (supported Abbott)	39.5	15.5	42.1	2.9	40 (0.5)	16.1 (0.6)	43.9 (1.8)	53.6 (13.6)	46.4 (30.3)
816:Coquitlam-Burke Mountain; MLA: Douglas Horne (supported Falcon)	47.3	36.6	12.5	3.5	48.5 (1.2)	37.6 (1)	13.9 (1.4)	51.9 (3.4)	48.1 (10.5)
817:Coquitlam-Maillardville	47	31.6	16.6	4.8	48.5 (1.5)	33.6 (2)	17.8 (1.2)	54.3 (5.8)	45.7 (12.1)
818:Cowichan Valley	41.2	19.7	34.7	4.4	41.7 (0.5)	20.7 (1)	37.6 (2.9)	56.7 (15)	43.3 (22.6)
819:Delta North	46.8	33.8	10.7	8.7	52 (5.2)	35.4 (1.6)	12.6 (1.9)	57.2 (5.2)	42.8 (7.4)
820:Delta South	42.3	23.6	26.6	7.4	46.8 (4.5)	24.9 (1.3)	28.4 (1.8)	56.8 (10)	43.2 (18.3)
821:Esquimalt-Royal Roads	37.7	21.6	28.4	12.3	39 (1.3)	25.8 (4.2)	35.2 (6.8)	54.3 (15.3)	45.7 (19.9)
822:Fort Langley-Aldergrove; MLA: Rich Coleman (supported Falcon)	33	39.4	16.6	11	36.5 (3.5)	43.9 (4.5)	19.6 (3)	42.6 (6.1)	57.4 (13.5)
823:Fraser-Nicola	42.7	22.6	29	5.6	44.6 (1.9)	22.8 (0.2)	32.5 (3.5)	57.9 (13.3)	42.1 (19.3)
824:Juan de Fuca	44.8	23.2	22.7	9.4	44.8 (0)	24.1 (0.9)	31 (8.3)	59.1 (14.3)	40.9 (16.8)
825:Kamloops-North Thompson; MLA: Terry Lake (supported Abbott)	27	29.5	35.9	7.7	33.4 (6.4)	30.2 (0.7)	36.4 (0.5)	44.4 (11)	55.6 (25.4)
826:Kamloops-South Thompson; MLA: Kevin Krueger (supported Abbott)	36.5	17.3	40.5	5.8	37.6 (1.1)	19.1 (1.8)	43.3 (2.8)	49.2 (11.6)	50.8 (31.7)
827:Kelowna-Lake Country; MLA: Norm Letnick (supported Abbott)	27.3	15	55.2	2.4	27.5 (0.2)	15.2 (0.2)	57.4 (2.2)	56.8 (29.3)	43.2 (28)
828:Kelowna-Mission; MLA: Steve Thomson (supported Abbott)	27.6	15.3	54	3.1	28.2 (0.6)	15.7 (0.4)	56.1 (2.1)	47.9 (19.7)	52.1 (36.4)
829:Kootenay East; MLA: Bill Bennett (supported Abbott)	32.4	5.7	61.6	0.3	32.4 (0)	5.7 (0)	61.9 (0.3)	55.6 (23.2)	44.4 (38.7)
830:Kootenay West	33.1	14.2	30.4	22.3	36.5 (3.4)	17.6 (3.4)	45.9 (15.5)	60.3 (23.8)	39.7 (22.1)
831:Langley; MLA: Mary Polak (supported Falcon)	34.9	49.7	12.5	2.9	36.7 (1.8)	49.9 (0.2)	13.4 (0.9)	41.9 (5.2)	58.1 (8.2)
832:Maple Ridge-Mission; MLA: Marc Dalton (supported Falcon)	38.3	34.8	18.5	8.4	42.5 (4.2)	36.9 (2.1)	20.6 (2.1)	50.2 (7.7)	49.8 (12.9)
833:Maple Ridge-Pitt Meadows	51.4	21.1	24.4	3.1	53 (1.6)	21.8 (0.7)	25.3 (0.9)	60.2 (7.2)	39.8 (18)
834:Nanaimo	47.7	25.6	15	11.7	51.3 (3.6)	26.4 (0.8)	22.3 (7.3)	59.9 (8.6)	40.1 (13.7)
835:Nanaimo-North Cowichan	46.2	20.5	25.1	8.3	48.2 (2)	21.1 (0.6)	30.7 (5.6)	58.6 (10.4)	41.4 (20.3)
836:Nechako Lakes; MLA: John Rustad (supported Abbott)	30.2	19.8	43.2	6.8	32 (1.8)	21.2 (1.4)	46.8 (3.6)	57.5 (25.5)	42.5 (21.3)
837:Nelson-Creston	36.5	12.7	42.1	8.6	39.6 (3.1)	14.7 (2)	45.7 (3.6)	57.5 (17.9)	42.5 (27.8)
838:New Westminster	48.4	23.5	11.6	16.5	59.5 (11.1)	25 (1.5)	15.5 (3.9)	65.2 (5.7)	34.8 (9.8)
839:North Coast	54.5	14.4	26.6	4.5	54.8 (0.3)	14.4 (0)	30.8 (4.2)	68.3 (13.5)	31.7 (17.3)
840:North Island	54.3	20.7	21.7	3.3	55 (0.7)	21.7 (1)	23.3 (1.6)	63.9 (8.9)	36.1 (14.4)
841:North Vancouver-Lonsdale; MLA: Naomi Yamamoto (supported Abbott)	43.3	27.9	26.9	1.9	44.5 (1.2)	28.3 (0.4)	27.2 (0.3)	53.1 (8.6)	46.9 (18.6)
842:North Vancouver-Seymour; MLA: Jane Thornthwaite (supported Abbott)	34.3	28.1	34.1	3.5	35.8 (1.5)	28.9 (0.8)	35.2 (1.1)	48.2 (12.4)	51.8 (22.9)
843:Oak Bay-Gordon Head; MLA: Ida Chong (supported Falcon)	32.8	23.8	32.9	10.5	34.1 (1.3)	26.2 (2.4)	39.7 (6.8)	49.4 (15.3)	50.6 (24.4)
844:Parksville-Qualicum; MLA: Ron Cantelon (supported Falcon)	45	18.5	33.4	3.1	45.9 (0.9)	18.9 (0.4)	35.3 (1.9)	59.5 (13.6)	40.5 (21.6)
845:Peace River North; MLA: Pat Pimm (supported Falcon)	25.1	54	12.7	8.2	31.8 (6.7)	54.4 (0.4)	13.8 (1.1)	37 (5.2)	63 (8.6)
846:Peace River South	33.6	33.6	28.4	4.3	33.6 (0)	34.5 (0.9)	31.9 (3.5)	44.5 (10.9)	55.5 (21)
847:Penticton; MLA: Bill Barisoff (remained neutral)	35.2	33.6	14	17.2	39.7 (4.5)	34.3 (0.7)	26 (12)	51.7 (12)	48.3 (14)
848:Port Coquitlam	49	34.4	13.5	3.1	50.1 (1.1)	35.2 (0.8)	14.6 (1.1)	54.5 (4.4)	45.5 (10.3)
849:Port Moody-Coquitlam; MLA: Iain Black (supported Falcon)	41.4	41.8	12.3	4.4	42.3 (0.9)	44.8 (3)	13 (0.7)	46.7 (4.4)	53.3 (8.5)
850:Powell River-Sunshine Coast	47.7	25.2	24.7	2.5	47.9 (0.2)	25.9 (0.7)	26.2 (1.5)	57.9 (10)	42.1 (16.2)
851:Prince George-Mackenzie; MLA: Pat Bell (supported Falcon)	28.3	47.8	16.8	7.1	32.5 (4.2)	48.4 (0.6)	19 (2.2)	37.4 (4.9)	62.6 (14.2)
852:Prince George-Valemount; MLA: Shirley Bond (supported Falcon)	28.5	47	19.3	5.2	30.2 (1.7)	48.4 (1.4)	21.4 (2.1)	36.5 (6.3)	63.5 (15.1)
853:Richmond Centre; MLA: Rob Howard (supported Falcon)	32.4	49	12.4	6.2	36.4 (4)	49.8 (0.8)	13.8 (1.4)	40.2 (3.8)	59.8 (10)
854:Richmond East; MLA: Linda Reid (remained neutral)	36.3	37.1	9	17.6	46.5 (10.2)	41.3 (4.2)	12.2 (3.2)	50.8 (4.3)	49.2 (7.9)
855:Richmond-Steveston; MLA: John Yap (supported Falcon)	32.2	43.2	20.2	4.4	35.2 (3)	43.5 (0.3)	21.3 (1.1)	40.4 (5.2)	59.6 (16.1)
856:Saanich North and the Islands; MLA: Murray Coell (supported Abbott)	38.1	16.2	39.7	6	40.3 (2.2)	17 (0.8)	42.7 (3)	54.4 (14.1)	45.6 (28.6)
857:Saanich South	55.1	17.4	18.2	9.3	56.5 (1.4)	18.9 (1.5)	24.6 (6.4)	67 (10.5)	33 (14.1)
858:Shuswap; MLA: George Abbott	5.5	1.8	92.1	0.6	5.5 (0)	2 (0.2)	92.5 (0.4)	29.8 (24.3)	70.2 (68.2)
859:Skeena	41.2	11.7	29.2	17.9	45.7 (4.5)	14.8 (3.1)	39.5 (10.3)	60.1 (14.4)	39.9 (25.1)
860:Stikine	41.5	26.2	26.8	5.5	43.3 (1.8)	26.2 (0)	30.5 (3.7)	52.9 (9.6)	47.1 (20.9)
861:Surrey-Cloverdale; MLA: Kevin Falcon	31.1	57.2	5.4	6.3	34.4 (3.3)	58.9 (1.7)	6.7 (1.3)	36.5 (2.1)	63.5 (4.6)
862:Surrey-Fleetwood	41.5	39.2	4.6	14.8	49.7 (8.2)	40.9 (1.7)	9.4 (4.8)	54.6 (4.9)	45.4 (4.5)
863:Surrey-Green Timbers	45.8	38	2.3	13.9	55.2 (9.4)	39.5 (1.5)	5.2 (2.9)	58.1 (2.9)	41.9 (2.4)
864:Surrey-Newton	48.1	31.3	2.7	17.9	61.1 (13)	32.7 (1.4)	6.2 (3.5)	65 (3.9)	35 (2.3)
865:Surrey-Panorama; MLA: Stephanie Cadieux (supported Falcon)	40.3	40	5.6	14.1	49.3 (9)	41.7 (1.7)	9 (3.4)	53.5 (4.2)	46.5 (4.8)
866:Surrey-Tynehead; MLA: Dave Hayer (supported Falcon)	36.5	50.1	5	8.4	41.9 (5.4)	51.8 (1.7)	6.3 (1.3)	44.3 (2.4)	55.7 (3.9)
867:Surrey-Whalley	42.3	38.2	2.7	16.8	54.2 (11.9)	39.6 (1.4)	6.2 (3.5)	57.8 (3.6)	42.2 (2.6)
868:Surrey-White Rock; MLA: Gordon Hogg (supported Abbott)	29.1	27.8	39.6	3.5	30.5 (1.4)	28.6 (0.8)	40.9 (1.3)	45.1 (14.6)	54.9 (26.3)
869:Vancouver-Fairview; MLA: Margaret MacDiarmid (supported Falcon)	40.2	35.8	20.4	3.7	41.3 (1.1)	36.5 (0.7)	22.2 (1.8)	50.3 (9)	49.7 (13.2)
870:Vancouver-False Creek; MLA: Mary McNeil (supported Abbott)	38.4	32.1	24	5.5	39.8 (1.4)	34.4 (2.3)	25.8 (1.8)	48.6 (8.8)	51.4 (17)
871:Vancouver-Fraserview; MLA: Kash Heed (supported Abbott)	41.3	22	4.6	32.1	65.8 (24.5)	25.8 (3.8)	8.4 (3.8)	70.1 (4.3)	29.9 (4.1)
872:Vancouver-Hastings	39.8	28.4	23.3	8.5	41.1 (1.3)	33.9 (5.5)	25 (1.7)	50.7 (9.6)	49.3 (15.4)
873:Vancouver-Kensington	43.6	27.1	7.8	21.6	59.2 (15.6)	29.8 (2.7)	11 (3.2)	64.6 (5.4)	35.4 (5.6)
874:Vancouver-Kingsway	48.5	30.6	8.1	12.8	58.7 (10.2)	31.9 (1.3)	9.4 (1.3)	63.4 (4.7)	36.6 (4.7)
875:Vancouver-Langara; MLA: Moira Stilwell (supported Abbott)	38.8	29.6	12.7	18.9	52.1 (13.3)	32.7 (3.1)	15.2 (2.5)	55.8 (3.7)	44.2 (11.5)
876:Vancouver-Mount Pleasant	39.7	32.8	14.1	13.4	45.2 (5.5)	34.5 (1.7)	20.3 (6.2)	54.5 (9.3)	45.5 (11)
877:Vancouver-Point Grey; MLA: Gordon Campbell (remained neutral)	31	33.9	28	7.1	32.3 (1.3)	35.3 (1.4)	32.4 (4.4)	43.3 (11)	56.7 (21.4)
878:Vancouver-Quilchena; MLA: Colin Hansen (supported Falcon)	30.6	39.9	25.6	3.8	31.2 (0.6)	41.3 (1.4)	27.5 (1.9)	37.7 (6.5)	62.3 (21)
879:Vancouver-West End	42.2	26.7	25.7	5.4	43 (0.8)	28.6 (1.9)	28.4 (2.7)	55.1 (12.1)	44.9 (16.3)
880:Vernon-Monashee; MLA: Eric Foster (supported Abbott)	36.5	9.2	51.2	3.1	38.3 (1.8)	9.7 (0.5)	51.9 (0.7)	50.7 (12.4)	49.3 (39.6)
881:Victoria-Beacon Hill	24.2	20.8	43	12.1	26.2 (2)	22.8 (2)	51 (8)	45.9 (19.7)	54.1 (31.3)
882:Victoria-Swan Lake	41.9	22.5	20.7	14.9	49.1 (7.2)	24.8 (2.3)	26.1 (5.4)	61 (11.9)	39 (14.2)
883:West Vancouver-Capilano; MLA: Ralph Sultan (supported Abbott)	30.3	36.8	30.6	2.3	31.1 (0.8)	37.6 (0.8)	31.3 (0.7)	38.7 (7.6)	61.3 (23.7)
884:West Vancouver-Sea to Sky; MLA: Joan McIntyre (supported Falcon)	27.6	43.6	20.8	8	32.2 (4.6)	44 (0.4)	23.8 (3)	40.5 (8.3)	59.5 (15.5)
885:Westside-Kelowna; MLA: Ben Stewart (supported Falcon)	28.4	34.3	31.3	5.9	29.6 (1.2)	35.9 (1.6)	34.5 (3.2)	40.2 (10.6)	59.8 (23.9)

== Potential/withdrawn candidates ==
Potential candidates that declined to run:

- Iain Black, MLA for Port Moody-Westwood, Minister of Labour
- Rich Coleman, MLA for Fort Langley-Aldergrove, Solicitor General and Minister for Public Safety
- Dianne Watts, Mayor of Surrey
- Carole Taylor, former MLA for Vancouver-Langara (2005–08) and former Minister of Finance (2005–08)

Withdrawn candidates:

=== Moira Stilwell ===
MLA for Vancouver-Langara (since 2009), Minister of Regional Economic and Skills Development (2010), Minister of Education and Labour Market Development (2009–10).

Date campaign launched: November 22, 2010
Date campaign ended: February 16, 2011, endorsed George Abbott
Proposed policies: Moving the HST referendum to an earlier date, raising the minimum wage to $10/hour, decrease student loan rate to no higher than prime plus 1%, significant new funding for college and university infrastructure, tax incentives for municipalities that reduce or eliminate Class 4 (major industrial) tax rates, increasing the "Passport to Education" program to encourage enrollment into community colleges, and develop the National Mountain Search and Rescue Training Institute in Revelstoke.

=== Ed Mayne ===
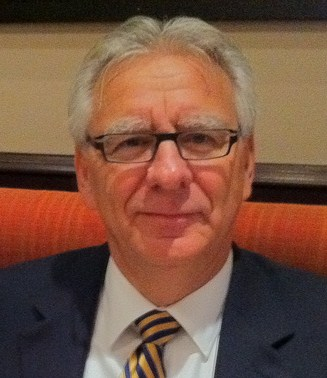

Mayor of Parksville, British Columbia.

Date campaign launched: January 3, 2011
Date campaign ended: February 17, 2011, endorsed George Abbott
Proposed policies: Free votes in the legislature (except on confidence issues), term limits for premiers, mandatory voting or tax credits to encourage people to vote, increase minimum wage over two or three years, improving the Southern Railway of Vancouver Island, and use universities to develop the green energy sector and attract manufacturing jobs.

== Polling ==
Early polling has shown that Christy Clark is the candidate with the highest level of support among all voters, with a net positive score of eleven versus minus one for George Abbott, minus twelve for Moira Stilwell, minus eighteen for Mike de Jong, and minus twenty-three for Kevin Falcon. This is in line with earlier polls which found Clark with a twenty-five-point lead among all voters as preferred BC Liberal leader and a fourteen-point lead among definite Liberal voters. An update of the poll on February 22, after Stilwell and Mayne had withdrawn, showed Clark still leading with a 67% favourability rating, with Falcon in second at 51%, and Abbott and de Jong tied at third with 46%.

Early in the race, an analysis of social media in the Vancouver Sun, published on December 11, 2010, found that Kevin Falcon had generated the most social media traffic amongst the candidates who had already declared their intention to run.

== Debates ==
Initially, the Party did not intend to hold public debates between the candidates. However, debate forums were eventually announced on January 27, 2011, via the BC Liberals' website:

- February 2: BC Liberal Party Leadership Debate, Kamloops
- February 3: BC Liberal Party Leadership Debate, Prince George
- February 12: BC Liberal Party Leadership Debate, Vancouver

The BC Liberal Party designed and controlled the debate format, intending for them to be non-controversial. Only registered party members were able to attend, all debate questions were provided to the candidates in advance, and there were few exchanges between the candidates. The debates were criticized as being bland and stifling. Following the withdrawal of Stilwell and Mayne, an additional debate was held between the remaining candidates and aired on Shaw TV Vancouver on February 20.

== Timeline ==
- November 3, 2010: BC premier Gordon Campbell announces his resignation and calls on his party to hold a leadership convention
- November 4, 2010: Campbell confirms that he will remain as leader until the BC Liberal Party elects his successor
- November 13, 2010: The BC Liberal Party Provincial Executive recommends a new voting system to be adopted for the upcoming leadership vote
- November 15, 2010: the BC Liberal Party Provincial Executive sets February 26, 2011 as the date for the Party's leadership vote
- November 22, 2010: Moira Stilwell becomes the first candidate for the BC Liberal Party leadership
- November 25, 2010: George Abbott announces his candidacy
- November 30, 2010: Kevin Falcon announces his candidacy
- December 1, 2010: Michael de Jong announces his candidacy
- December 6, 2010: NDP Leader Carole James announced she will step down as leader of the New Democratic Party as soon as an interim leader can be selected, kicking off the leadership election process for BC Liberals' principal competition.
- December 8, 2010: Christy Clark announces her candidacy

== See also ==
- British Columbia Liberal Party leadership elections
- British Columbia Liberal Party leadership election, 2018
- 2011 British Columbia New Democratic Party leadership election
