= Joe Trasolini =

Canadian politician

Member of the British Columbia Legislative Assembly for Port Moody-Coquitlam
- In office April 19, 2012 – May 14, 2013
- Preceded by: Iain Black
- Succeeded by: Linda Reimer

Mayor of Port Moody
- In office 1999–2011
- Preceded by: Rick Marusyk
- Succeeded by: Mike Clay

Personal details
- Born: Giuseppe Trasolini; 1947 or 1948 (age 77–78) Italy
- Party: New Democrat
- Spouse: Cecilia Huang
- Education: British Columbia Institute of Technology

Joe Trasolini (born 1947 or 1948) is a Canadian politician who served as a member of the Legislative Assembly of British Columbia (MLA) from 2012 to 2013, representing the electoral district of Port Moody-Coquitlam as part of the British Columbia New Democratic Party (NDP) caucus. He previously served four terms as mayor of Port Moody.

== Biography ==
Born in Italy, Trasolini moved to British Columbia in 1963, and graduated from the chemical and metallurgical engineering technology program at the British Columbia Institute of Technology. He has owned and managed a contracting firm since 1985, and had previously lived in Coquitlam until moving to Port Moody in 1994.

He was elected to Port Moody City Council in 1996, then became mayor in 1999. He was re-elected in 2002, 2005 and 2008. He became the first mayor in British Columbia to implement a weekly open door session for constituents. He also served as a director of Metro Vancouver, and as part of the TransLink Mayor's Council he helped secure funding for the SkyTrain Millennium Line's Evergreen Extension. He did not seek re-election in 2011.

Following the resignation of Port Moody-Coquitlam MLA Iain Black, Trasolini was announced in November 2011 as the NDP candidate in the ensuing by-election. He was elected to the legislature by taking 54% of the vote in the April 2012 by-election, and served as opposition critic for housing, construction, and business development in the 39th Parliament.

He was defeated in the 2013 provincial election by Linda Reimer of the BC Liberals.

== Electoral record ==
2013 British Columbia general election: Port Moody-Coquitlam
Party	Candidate	Votes	%	±%	Expenditures
Liberal	Linda Reimer	9,675	46.38	+16.08	$97,626
New Democratic	Joe Trasolini	9,238	44.29	-10.05	$130,654
Green	Billie Helps	1,708	8.19	–	$250
Libertarian	Jeff Monds	237	1.14	–	$250
Total valid votes		20,858	100.00	–	
Total rejected ballots		133	0.63	+0.24	
Turnout		20,991	58.75	26.68	
Registered voters		35,731			
Source: Elections BC

British Columbia provincial by-election, 19 April 2012: Port Moody-Coquitlam
Party	Candidate	Votes	%	±%	Expenditures
New Democratic	Joe Trasolini	6,247	54.34	+14.54	$132,357
Liberal	Dennis Marsden	3,484	30.30	−21.85	$95,639
Conservative	Christine N. Clarke	1,766	15.36	–	$21,847
Total valid votes		11,497	100.00	–	
Total rejected ballots		45	0.39	−0.14	
Turnout		11,542	32.07	−25.37	
Registered voters		35,991			
Source: Elections BC
