= Yuri Fulmer =

Canadian entrepreneur and philanthropist

Yuri Fulmer OBC

21st Chancellor of Capilano University
- In office June 7, 2020 – May 31, 2026
- Preceded by: David Fung
- Succeeded by: Debra Doucette

Chair of the B.C. Ferry Authority
- In office c. 2016–c. 2019
- Preceded by: Roderick D. Dewar
- Succeeded by: Sandra A. Stoddart-Hansen

Personal details
- Born: May 5, 1974 (age 52) Perth, Western Australia, Australia
- Citizenship: Canadian; Australian
- Party: BC Conservatives
- Occupation: Businessman

Yuri Leith Fulmer, OBC (born May 5, 1974) is an Australian-born Canadian businessman and philanthropist based in Vancouver, British Columbia. He is the chair of Fulmer & Company, global chair of United Way Worldwide, and chancellor of Capilano University. Fulmer is a member of the Order of British Columbia (2011) and was awarded the Queen's Diamond Jubilee Medal (2012).

== Early life ==
Fulmer was born in Perth, Western Australia, to a Canadian father and an Australian mother, holding dual citizenship. He moved to Vancouver in 1992.

== Career ==
Fulmer began his career in the food and hospitality industry in 1997 by acquiring his first A&W Canada restaurant. He later expanded his holdings across British Columbia, Alberta, and Saskatchewan through Western Restaurants Franchises Inc. In 2005, he acquired Mr. Mikes Steakhouse and Bar, revitalizing and expanding the chain before its eventual sale to Yellow Point Equity Partners in 2010.

In 2010, Fulmer founded Fulmer & Company, focusing on investments across technology, manufacturing, and consumer goods. The company has invested in over 30 businesses, including BBSPro Services Inc.

=== Philanthropy ===
Fulmer established the Fulmer Foundation in 2019 to support community-focused initiatives. The foundation has partnered with organizations such as the Greater Vancouver Food Bank. He has also served in leadership roles within United Way of Canada and was appointed global chair of United Way Worldwide in 2024.

Fulmer was installed as chancellor of Capilano University in 2020 and was renewed for a second term in 2023. He has supported Indigenous art initiatives through the BC Achievement Foundation and volunteers with community events such as the Honda Celebration of Light in Vancouver.

=== Politics ===
In 2024, Fulmer ran as the Conservative Party of British Columbia candidate for West Vancouver-Sea to Sky in the provincial election. He was defeated by Green Party candidate Jeremy Valeriote.

In January, Fulmer announced his intention to run in the 2026 Conservative Party of British Columbia leadership election. During the campaign, he stated his willingness to work with OneBC and not run candidates in select ridings. He placed fourth in the election.

== Accolades ==
- Canada's Top Forty Under 40, 2008
- British Columbia Community Achievement Award, 2010
- Order of British Columbia
- Queen's Diamond Jubilee Medal, 2012 for his contribution to Canadian communities
- The Joseph and Rosalie Community Vision Award, 2014
- Business in Vancouver Living Legends, 2021
- 2011 Recipient: Yuri Fulmer – North Vancouver: Order of BC
- Entrepreneur of the Year, Finalist, 2010 - Ernst & Young
- Chancellor of Capilano University
- BC500 The Most Influential Business Leaders, Business in Vancouver, 2023

== Electoral history ==
=== Leadership elections ===
= Eliminated from next round
= Winner

Candidate	Ballot 1		Ballot 2		Ballot 3		Ballot 4	
Name	Votes	Points	Votes	Points	Votes	Points	Votes	Points
Kerry-Lynne Findlay	7,583 29.9%	2806.42 30.5%	7,844 30.9%	2961.53 32.2%	9,050 35.7%	3559.78 38.6%	10,907 43.0%	4696.51 51.0%
Caroline Elliott	6,760 26.7%	2374.14 25.8%	7,393 29.2%	2638.74 28.6%	7,800 30.76%	2883.71 31.3%	10,847 42.8%	4514.49 49.0%
Iain Black	4,902 19.3%	1865.82 20.3%	6,077 24.0%	2328.21 25.3%	6971 27.5%	2767.51 30.0%	Eliminated	
Yuri Fulmer	3,163 12.5%	1193.27 13.0%	3,344 13.2%	1282.52 13.9%	Eliminated			
Peter Milobar	2,893 11.4%	971.34 10.5%	Eliminated					
Total Valid	25,301	9211.0	24,658	9211.0	23,821	9211.0	21,754	9211.0
Abstain / exhausted	58 0.2%	n/a	701 2.8%	n/a	1538 6.1%	n/a	3,605 14.2%	n/a

=== Provincial elections ===
2024 British Columbia general election: West Vancouver-Sea to Sky
Party	Candidate	Votes	%	±%	Expenditures
Green	Jeremy Valeriote	10,438	38.08	-0.1	$65,275.93
Conservative	Yuri Fulmer	9,762	35.61	–	$86,706
New Democratic	Jen Ford	7,212	26.31	+0.6	$31,452
Total valid votes		27,412	–		
Total rejected ballots					
Turnout					
Registered voters					
Green notional hold		Swing		–	
Source: Elections BC
