= Caroline Elliott =

Canadian politician (born 1984)

The Honourable Caroline Elliott KC MLA

Attorney General of British Columbia
- Incumbent
- Assumed office November 20, 2026
- Premier: Lorne Doerkson
- Preceded by: Niki Sharma

Member of the British Columbia Legislative Assembly for West Vancouver-Capilano
- Incumbent
- Assumed office October 24, 2026
- Preceded by: Lynne Block

Personal details
- Born: 1984 (age 41–42) Surrey, British Columbia, Canada
- Party: BC Conservative (2024–present)
- Other political affiliations: BC United (before 2024)
- Children: 2
- Relatives: Kevin Falcon (brother-in-law)
- Education: Simon Fraser University (PhD)

Caroline Elliott KC MLA (born 1984) is a Canadian politician and political commentator who has served as a member of the Legislative Assembly of British Columbia (MLA) representing the electoral district of West Vancouver-Capilano since 2026. A member of the Conservative Party, she finished second in the party's 2026 leadership election being defeated by Kerry-Lynne Findlay. On November 20, 2026, she was named the Attorney General of British Columbia.

== Early career and education ==
Elliott holds a PhD in political science from Simon Fraser University, where her research focused on Canadian liberal democracy and Indigenous self-governance. She has taught political science as an instructor at Simon Fraser University and spent some years in the natural resource sector.

Elliott served on the board of directors of the Public Land Use Society, a British Columbia-based organization that advocates for public access to Crown land for recreation, resource development, and economic activity, until stepping aside in January 2026 for her leadership campaign.

Caroline Elliot spent several years at BC Hydro working on the Site C dam project, including with the joint federal-provincial environmental assessment used by the province for its 2014 final investment decision. She has run a communications business, providing advice for clients in the resource sector.

She has been a senior fellow with the Aristotle Foundation for Public Policy, a think tank; a director with the Public Land Use Society; and she is co-founder of the online opinion publication Without Diminishment.

== Political career ==
=== BC United ===
Elliott served both as a ministerial staffer and a party volunteer with BC United (formerly BC Liberals) for the past 20 years. She served as vice-president for the party from 2022 to 2024, participating in party governance and communications during a period of internal restructuring and rebranding following the transition from the BC Liberal Party to BC United.

In February 2024, Elliott resigned her role as vice-president of BC United, to announce her candidacy in the riding of West Vancouver-Capilano in the 2024 general election. However, as a result of the withdrawal of BC United from the 2024 election and decision not to field any paper candidates, she chose not to run. Elliott played a key role in brokering the deal between BC United and the BC Conservatives that led to the BC United’s withdrawal from the election.

=== BC Conservatives ===
==== 2026 leadership election ====
On January 13, 2026, Elliott announced her candidacy for the BC Conservative leadership election. She was one of five candidates who made it on the final ballot. Her platform included reforms to the criminal justice system on issues like catch-and-release, and replacing British Columbia's Declaration on the Rights of Indigenous Peoples Act (DRIPA) with a Canadian framework emphasizing the public interest and private property rights.

During her campaign she faced criticisms for bringing in strategists from outside B.C., including Kory Teneycke, who ran Ontario Premier Doug Ford's 2025 election campaign. Other individuals joined her campaign inculding, Jeff Ballingall; former advisor to Toronto mayors Rob Ford and John Tory; former spokesperson for federal Conservative leader Pierre Poilievre and ex-BC Conservative leader John Rustad.

In May, Elliott narrowly lost the leadership election to former MP Kerry-Lynne Findlay by a vote of 51% to 49%, on the final of four ballots.

==== 2026 provincial election ====
In September 2026, Elliott was confirmed as a candidate for the BC Conservatives in the 2026 general election running in the electoral district of West Vancouver-Capilano. The incumbent MLA Lynne Block was moved to run in North Vancouver-Seymour. Elliott won the election.

== Electoral history ==
=== Provincial elections ===
2026 British Columbia general election: West Vancouver-Capilano
** Preliminary results — Not yet official **
Party	Candidate	Votes	%	±%
Conservative	Caroline Elliott	16,039	67.01	
New Democratic	Honieh Barzegari	4,870	20.35	
Green	Arwa Shurab	2,566	10.72	
OneBC	Naomi Chocyk	415	1.73	
Total valid votes		23,890	99.80	
Total rejected ballots		47	0.20	
Turnout		23,937		
Registered voters				
Conservative hold		Swing		+13.41
Source: Elections BC

=== Leadership elections ===
= Eliminated from next round
= Winner

Candidate	Ballot 1		Ballot 2		Ballot 3		Ballot 4	
Name	Votes	Points	Votes	Points	Votes	Points	Votes	Points
Kerry-Lynne Findlay	7,583 29.9%	2806.42 30.5%	7,844 30.9%	2961.53 32.2%	9,050 35.7%	3559.78 38.6%	10,907 43.0%	4696.51 51.0%
Caroline Elliott	6,760 26.7%	2374.14 25.8%	7,393 29.2%	2638.74 28.6%	7,800 30.76%	2883.71 31.3%	10,847 42.8%	4514.49 49.0%
Iain Black	4,902 19.3%	1865.82 20.3%	6,077 24.0%	2328.21 25.3%	6971 27.5%	2767.51 30.0%	Eliminated	
Yuri Fulmer	3,163 12.5%	1193.27 13.0%	3,344 13.2%	1282.52 13.9%	Eliminated			
Peter Milobar	2,893 11.4%	971.34 10.5%	Eliminated					
Total Valid	25,301	9211.0	24,658	9211.0	23,821	9211.0	21,754	9211.0
Abstain / exhausted	58 0.2%	n/a	701 2.8%	n/a	1538 6.1%	n/a	3,605 14.2%	n/a
