= Rick Glumac =

Canadian politician

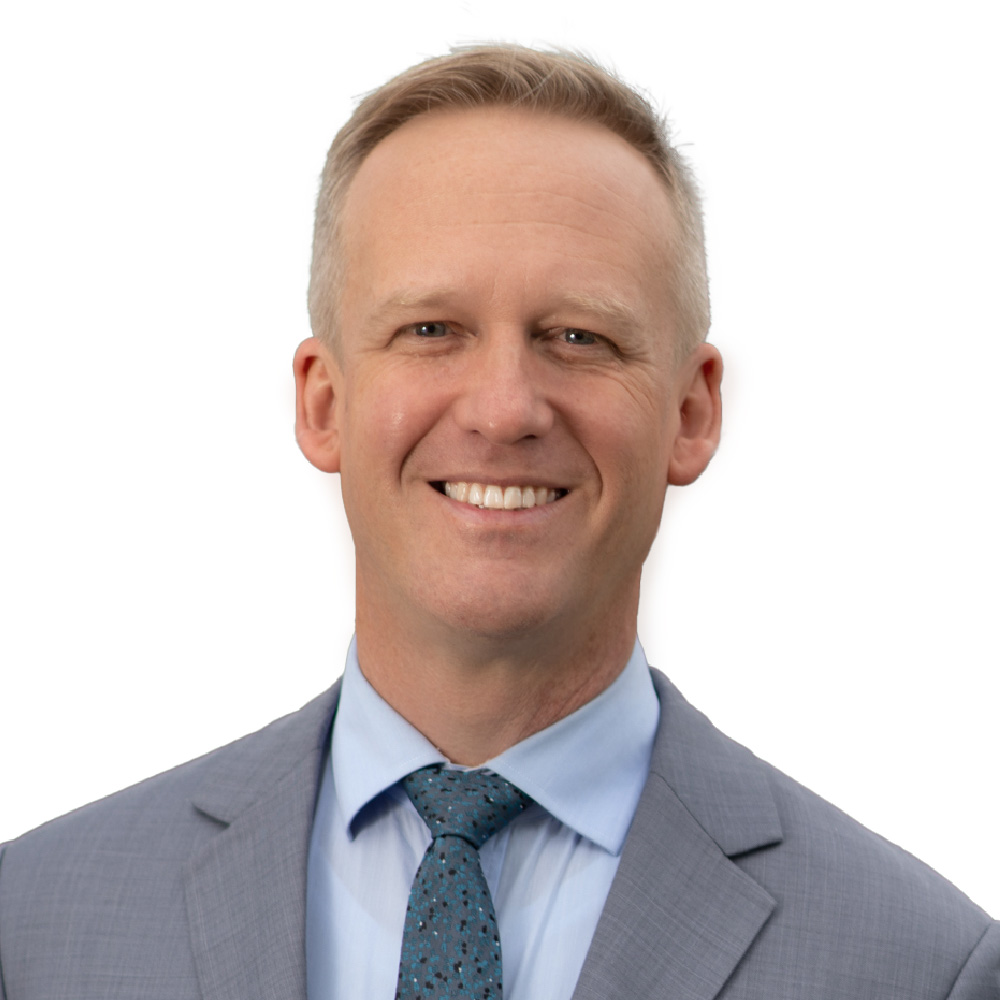
- Campaign portrait, 2024

Minister of State for Artificial Intelligence and New Technologies of British Columbia
- In office July 17, 2025 – November 20, 2026
- Premier: David Eby
- Preceded by: Position established

Minister of State for Trade of British Columbia
- In office November 18, 2024 – July 17, 2025
- Premier: David Eby
- Preceded by: Jagrup Brar
- Succeeded by: Position abolished

Parliamentary Secretary for Technology of British Columbia
- In office July 18, 2017 – November 26, 2020
- Premier: John Horgan
- Preceded by: Position established
- Succeeded by: Brenda Bailey (Technology and Innovation)

Member of the British Columbia Legislative Assembly for Port Moody-Burquitlam
- In office May 9, 2017 – October 24, 2026
- Preceded by: Linda Reimer
- Succeeded by: John McEwen

Personal details
- Party: BC NDP
- Education: Simon Fraser University

Rick Glumac is a Canadian politician who was elected to the Legislative Assembly of British Columbia in the 2017 provincial election.

As an MLA (Member of the Legislative Assembly) for the British Columbia New Democratic Party, he represented the riding of Port Moody-Burquitlam, which encompasses some of the western part of the city of Coquitlam, the entire city of Port Moody, and the villages of Anmore and Belcarra.

Glumac served as the Parliamentary Secretary for Technology until November 2020. He has served as the provincial representative to the Pacific NorthWest Economic Region (PNWER) since 2017, and became president of PNWER in July 2023. In December 2020, he was appointed as Premier's Liaison to Washington State. Glumac's position was expanded in April 2023 and he was appointed by David Eby to serve as Premier's Liaison for the Pacific Northwest.

Glumac was re-elected in the 2020 and 2024 provincial elections. Following the 2024 election, he was appointed Minister of State for Trade. In 2025, he was appointed Minister of State for Artificial Intelligence and New Technologies, aligning with the federal position of Minister of Artificial Intelligence and Digital Innovation.

== Early life ==
Glumac grew up in Port Alberni, BC. In 1995, he graduated with a degree in Electronics Engineering from Simon Fraser University.

Glumac worked much of his career in the field of computer graphics as a software developer, visual effects artist, and computer graphics supervisor. He worked on the first computer-animated TV show ReBoot, and later worked for companies such as DreamWorks and Electronic Arts on well-known Hollywood films such as Shrek 2, Madagascar, and Over the Hedge. Following this he developed apps for the iPhone.

== Career in politics ==
Glumac was first elected to Port Moody city council in 2011. He was re-elected in 2014 with the highest vote share of any candidate. On council he chaired various committees including the Environmental Protection Committee and Economic Development Committee which recommended the hiring of an Economic Development Officer to grow the city's business tax base.

During his time as a Councillor, he served as the Vice President of the Lower Mainland Local Government Association. Glumac was also elected as the Vancouver Metro Area Representative to the Union of B.C. Municipalities (UBCM).

Glumac worked with the Ministry of Health to keep the Eagle Ridge Hospital lands in Port Moody from being sold for redevelopment, stopping a plan by the BC Liberal government to condition new improvements to the hospital on the sale of the lands to private real estate developers.

Glumac consistently speaks in the legislature to promote action to protect B.C.’s environment. In 2018, he spoke during the Legislature's emergency debate on climate change. He is a key supporter of the province's CleanBC strategy of reducing climate pollution and promoting renewable energies, lowering the costs of renewable energies, and helping create green jobs. He is a staunch advocate for redeveloping the Burrard Generating Station, a former fossil fuel-powered power plant located on the Burrard Inlet, into a site for clean technology or climate mitigation projects.

As Parliamentary Secretary for Technology, Glumac championed innovation in the clean technologies as a tool for transitioning towards a green economy. He has advocated support for B.C.'s clean energy and tech sectors which play an increasingly important role in the provincial economy.

As President of the Pacific Northwest Economic Region (PNWER), Glumac secured funding to create PNWER Canada and the hiring of PNWER's first staff member in Canada.

== Personal life ==
On May 11, 2022, Rick Glumac proposed to his partner Haven Lurbiecki in the legislature, prior to question period. Glumac is the first member of the legislative assembly to propose in the legislature and likely the first in Canada (Australian MP Tim Wilson proposed to his partner during a speech to Parliament in 2017). Lurbiecki was elected as Mayor in Port Moody in the 2026 local elections.

== Electoral record ==
2026 British Columbia general election: Port Moody-Burquitlam
Party	Candidate	Votes	%	±%	Expenditures
Conservative	John McEwen	11,929	46.69		
New Democratic	Rick Glumac	10,760	42.11		
Green	Wei Chou	2,103	8.23		
CentreBC	Freddy Rawji	715	2.80	—	
Total valid votes		25,507	99.83		
Total rejected ballots		44	0.17		
Turnout		25,551			
Registered voters					
Conservative gain from New Democratic		Swing		+8.13	
Source: Elections BC

2024 British Columbia general election: Port Moody-Burquitlam
Party	Candidate	Votes	%	±%	Expenditures
New Democratic	Rick Glumac	13,488	52.06	-2.4	$44,395.79
Conservative	Kerry van Aswegen	10,493	40.50	+37.6	$39,458.02
Green	Samantha Agtarap	1,927	7.44	-4.0	$1,355.35
Total valid votes/expense limit		25,908	99.83	–	$71,700.08
Total rejected ballots		45	0.17	–	
Turnout		25,953	58.72	–	
Registered voters		44,199			
New Democratic notional hold		Swing		-20.0	
Source: Elections BC

2020 British Columbia general election: Port Moody-Coquitlam
Party	Candidate	Votes	%	±%	Expenditures
New Democratic	Rick Glumac	12,783	53.75	+6.06	$41,007.46
Liberal	James Robertson	7,253	30.50	−9.70	$43,575.39
Green	John Latimer	2,802	11.78	−0.33	$1,920.08
Conservative	Brandon Fonseca	800	3.36	–	$250.00
Libertarian	Logan Smith	144	0.61	–	$0.00
Total valid votes		23,782	100.00	–	
Total rejected ballots					
Turnout					
Registered voters					
Source: Elections BC

2017 British Columbia general election: Port Moody-Coquitlam
Party	Candidate	Votes	%	±%	Expenditures
New Democratic	Rick Glumac	11,754	47.69	+3.40	$64,112
Liberal	Linda Reimer	9,910	40.20	−6.18	$65,386
Green	Don Barthel	2,985	12.11	+3.92	$1,056
Total valid votes		24,649	100.00	–	
Total rejected ballots		137	0.55	−0.08	
Turnout		24,786	65.31	+6.56	
Registered voters		37,950			
Source: Elections BC
