= Kamloops Centre =

Provincial electoral district in British Columbia, Canada

British Columbia electoral district

Provincial electoral district
- Legislature: Legislative Assembly of British Columbia
MLA
Peter Milobar
Conservative
- District created: 2023
- First contested: 2024
- Last contested: 2026

Demographics
- Population (2021): 60,681
- Area (km²): 114
- Pop. density (per km²): 532.3
- Census division: Thompson-Nicola
- Census subdivision: Kamloops (part)

Kamloops Centre is a provincial electoral district in British Columbia that has been represented in the Legislative Assembly of British Columbia since 2024.

Created under the 2021 British Columbia electoral redistribution, the riding was first contested in the 2024 general election. It was created out of parts of Kamloops-South Thompson and Kamloops-North Thompson.

== Demographics ==
Population, 2021	60,681
Area (km^{2})	114
Pop. Density (people per km^{2})	532
Source: BC Electoral Boundaries Commission

== Geography ==
The riding covers the urban core of Kamloops along with the neighbouring communities of Aberdeen, Tranquille, Thompson Rivers University, North Kamloops, and Brocklehurst. Its southern, eastern, and western limits are defined by the city's municipal boundaries, while the northern boundary follows the CN Railway line.

== Members of the Legislative Assembly ==
This riding has elected the following members of the Legislative Assembly:

Assembly	Years	Member	Party
Kamloops Centre; Riding created from Kamloops-North Thompson and Kamloops-South Thompson
43rd	2024–2026	Peter Milobar	Conservative
43rd	2026–2026	Peter Milobar	Independent
43rd	2026–2026 (Note: Rejoined the Conservatives after dissolution.)	Peter Milobar	CentreBC
44th	2026–present	Peter Milobar	Conservative

== Election results ==
2026 British Columbia general election
The 2026 general election will be held on October 24.
Party	Candidate	Votes	%	±%	Expenditures
Conservative	Peter Milobar				
New Democratic	Mike Wisla				
Green	Annelise Beach				
OneBC	Rocky McAfee			–	
Independent	Thaelo Proctor			–	
Total valid votes					
Total rejected ballots					
Turnout					
Registered voters					
Source: Elections BC

2024 British Columbia general election
Party	Candidate	Votes	%	±%	Expenditures
Conservative	Peter Milobar	12,372	48.83	+45.8	$39,481.01
New Democratic	Kamal Grewal	10,369	40.92	+0.4	$29,552.54
Green	Randy Sunderman	2,597	10.25	-5.5	$18,047.46
Total valid votes/expense limit		25,338	99.86	–	$71,700.08
Total rejected ballots		36	0.14	–	
Turnout		25,374	57.59	–	
Registered voters		44,059			
Conservative notional gain from BC United		Swing		N/A (Note: Swing cannot be calculated as BC United did not run a candidate in this riding.)	
Source: Elections BC

2020 provincial election redistributed results
Party	%
Liberal	40.7
New Democratic	40.5
Green	15.7
Conservative	3.0

== See also ==
- List of British Columbia provincial electoral districts
- Canadian provincial electoral districts
