= Port Moody-Burquitlam =

Provincial electoral district in British Columbia, Canada

British Columbia electoral district
- Interactive map of riding boundaries

Provincial electoral district
- Legislature: Legislative Assembly of British Columbia
MLA
John McEwen
Conservative
- District created: 2008
- First contested: 2009
- Last contested: 2026

Demographics
- Population (2021): 59,769
- Area (km²): 84
- Pop. density (per km²): 711.5
- Census division: Metro Vancouver
- Census subdivision(s): Coquitlam (part), Port Moody, Anmore, Belcarra

Port Moody-Burquitlam (formerly Port Moody-Coquitlam) is a provincial electoral district for the Legislative Assembly of British Columbia.

Created under the 2008 British Columbia electoral redistribution, the riding was first contested in the 2009 general election. It adopted its current name and had modest boundary changes in the 2024 election, which implemented the results of the 2021 redistribution.

== Demographics ==
Population, 2021	59,769
Area (km^{2})	84
Pop. density (people per km^{2})	711
Source: BC Electoral Boundaries Commission

== Geography ==
Located in the Tri-Cities area of Metro Vancouver, the district comprises the cities of Port Moody and parts of Coquitlam, including the neighbourhood of Burquitlam. It also includes the villages of Belcarra and Anmore, as well as part of Eagle Ridge.

== Members of the Legislative Assembly ==
This riding has elected the following members of the Legislative Assembly:

Assembly	Years	Member	Party
Port Moody-Coquitlam; Riding created from Burquitlam, Port Coquitlam-Burke Mountain and Port Moody-Westwood
39th	2009–2011	Iain Black	Liberal
39th	2012–2013	Joe Trasolini	New Democratic
40th	2013–2017	Linda Reimer	Liberal
41st	2017–2020	Rick Glumac	New Democratic
42nd	2020–2024	Rick Glumac	New Democratic
Port Moody-Burquitlam
43rd	2024–2026	Rick Glumac	New Democratic
44th	2026–present	John McEwen	Conservative

== Election results ==
2026 British Columbia general election
The 2026 general election will be held on October 24.
Party	Candidate	Votes	%	±%	Expenditures
New Democratic	Rick Glumac				
Conservative	John McEwen				
Green	Wei Chou				
CentreBC	Freddy Rawji			–	
Total valid votes					
Total rejected ballots					
Turnout					
Registered voters					
Source: Elections BC

2024 British Columbia general election
Party	Candidate	Votes	%	±%	Expenditures
New Democratic	Rick Glumac	13,488	52.06	-2.4	$44,395.79
Conservative	Kerry van Aswegen	10,493	40.50	+37.6	$39,458.02
Green	Samantha Agtarap	1,927	7.44	-4.0	$1,355.35
Total valid votes/expense limit		25,908	99.83	–	$71,700.08
Total rejected ballots		45	0.17	–	
Turnout		25,953	58.72	–	
Registered voters		44,199			
New Democratic notional hold		Swing		-20.0	
Source: Elections BC

2020 provincial election redistributed results
Party	%
New Democratic	54.5
Liberal	30.6
Green	11.4
Conservative	2.9
Others	0.6

2020 British Columbia general election: Port Moody-Coquitlam
Party	Candidate	Votes	%	±%	Expenditures
New Democratic	Rick Glumac	12,783	53.75	+6.06	$41,007.46
Liberal	James Robertson	7,253	30.50	−9.70	$43,575.39
Green	John Latimer	2,802	11.78	−0.33	$1,920.08
Conservative	Brandon Fonseca	800	3.36	–	$250.00
Libertarian	Logan Smith	144	0.61	–	$0.00
Total valid votes		23,782	100.00	–	
Total rejected ballots					
Turnout					
Registered voters					
Source: Elections BC

2017 British Columbia general election: Port Moody-Coquitlam
Party	Candidate	Votes	%	±%	Expenditures
New Democratic	Rick Glumac	11,754	47.69	+3.40	$64,112
Liberal	Linda Reimer	9,910	40.20	−6.18	$65,386
Green	Don Barthel	2,985	12.11	+3.92	$1,056
Total valid votes		24,649	100.00	–	
Total rejected ballots		137	0.55	−0.08	
Turnout		24,786	65.31	+6.56	
Registered voters		37,950			
Source: Elections BC

2013 British Columbia general election: Port Moody-Coquitlam
Party	Candidate	Votes	%	±%	Expenditures
Liberal	Linda Reimer	9,675	46.38	+16.08	$97,626
New Democratic	Joe Trasolini	9,238	44.29	-10.05	$130,654
Green	Billie Helps	1,708	8.19	–	$250
Libertarian	Jeff Monds	237	1.14	–	$250
Total valid votes		20,858	100.00	–	
Total rejected ballots		133	0.63	+0.24	
Turnout		20,991	58.75	26.68	
Registered voters		35,731			
Source: Elections BC

British Columbia provincial by-election, 19 April 2012: Port Moody-Coquitlam
Party	Candidate	Votes	%	±%	Expenditures
New Democratic	Joe Trasolini	6,247	54.34	+14.54	$132,357
Liberal	Dennis Marsden	3,484	30.30	−21.85	$95,639
Conservative	Christine N. Clarke	1,766	15.36	–	$21,847
Total valid votes		11,497	100.00	–	
Total rejected ballots		45	0.39	−0.14	
Turnout		11,542	32.07	−25.37	
Registered voters		35,991			
Source: Elections BC

2009 British Columbia general election: Port Moody-Coquitlam
Party	Candidate	Votes	%	Expenditures
Liberal	Iain Black	9,979	52.15	$92,290
New Democratic	Shannon Watkins	7,614	39.80	$76,297
Green	Rebecca Helps	1,261	6.59	$1,048
Your Political Party	James Filippelli	198	1.03	$775
Refederation	Donna Vandekerkhove	82	0.43	$260
Total valid votes		19,134	100	
Total rejected ballots		102	0.53	
Turnout		19,236	57.44	
Registered voters		33,487		
Source: Elections BC

== See also ==
- List of British Columbia provincial electoral districts
- Canadian provincial electoral districts
