= Port Moody-Westwood =

Defunct provincial electoral district in British Columbia, Canada

British Columbia electoral district

Defunct provincial electoral district
- Legislature: Legislative Assembly of British Columbia
- First contested: 2001
- Last contested: 2005

Demographics
- Population (2001): 61,637
- Area (km²): 88.11
- Census division: Metro Vancouver
- Census subdivision(s): Anmore, Belcarra, Coquitlam, Port Moody

Port Moody-Westwood was a provincial electoral district for the Legislative Assembly of British Columbia, Canada, from 2001 to 2009. Encompassing the northern part of the city of Coquitlam (including Westwood Plateau), the city of Port Moody, and the villages of Anmore and Belcarra, the riding was represented in the legislature by members of the British Columbia Liberal Party for its entire existence.

== Demographics ==
Population, 2001	61,637
Population Change, 1996–2001	24.5%
Area (km^{2})	88.11
Pop. Density (People per (km^{2})	700

== Members of the Legislative Assembly ==
Parliament	Years	Member	Party
Created from Port Moody-Burnaby Mountain and Port Coquitlam
37th	2001–2005	Christy Clark	BC Liberal
38th	2005–2009	Iain Black	BC Liberal
Re-districted into Port Moody-Coquitlam and Coquitlam-Burke Mountain in 2009

== Election results ==
2005 British Columbia general election
Party	Candidate	Votes	%	Expenditures
Liberal	Iain Black	14,161	53.75	$105,019
New Democratic	Karen Rockwell	9,848	37.38	$59,981
Green	Kathy Heisler	1,670	6.34	$200
Your Political Party	James Filippelli	442	1.68	$710
Independent	Arthur Crossman	227	0.85	$125
Total valid votes		26,348	100	
Total rejected ballots		128	0.49	
Turnout		26,476	60.57	
Registered voters		43,715		
Source: Elections BC

Template:2001 British Columbia general election/Port Moody-Westwood

== See also ==
- List of British Columbia provincial electoral districts
- Canadian provincial electoral districts
