= 2018 British Columbia Liberal Party leadership election =

Canadian provincial party election

- February 3, 2018
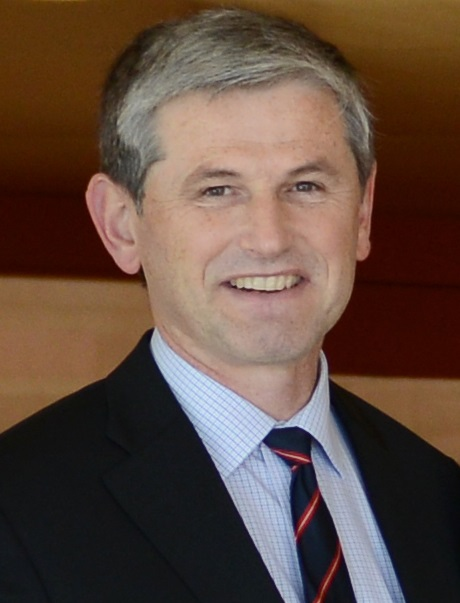

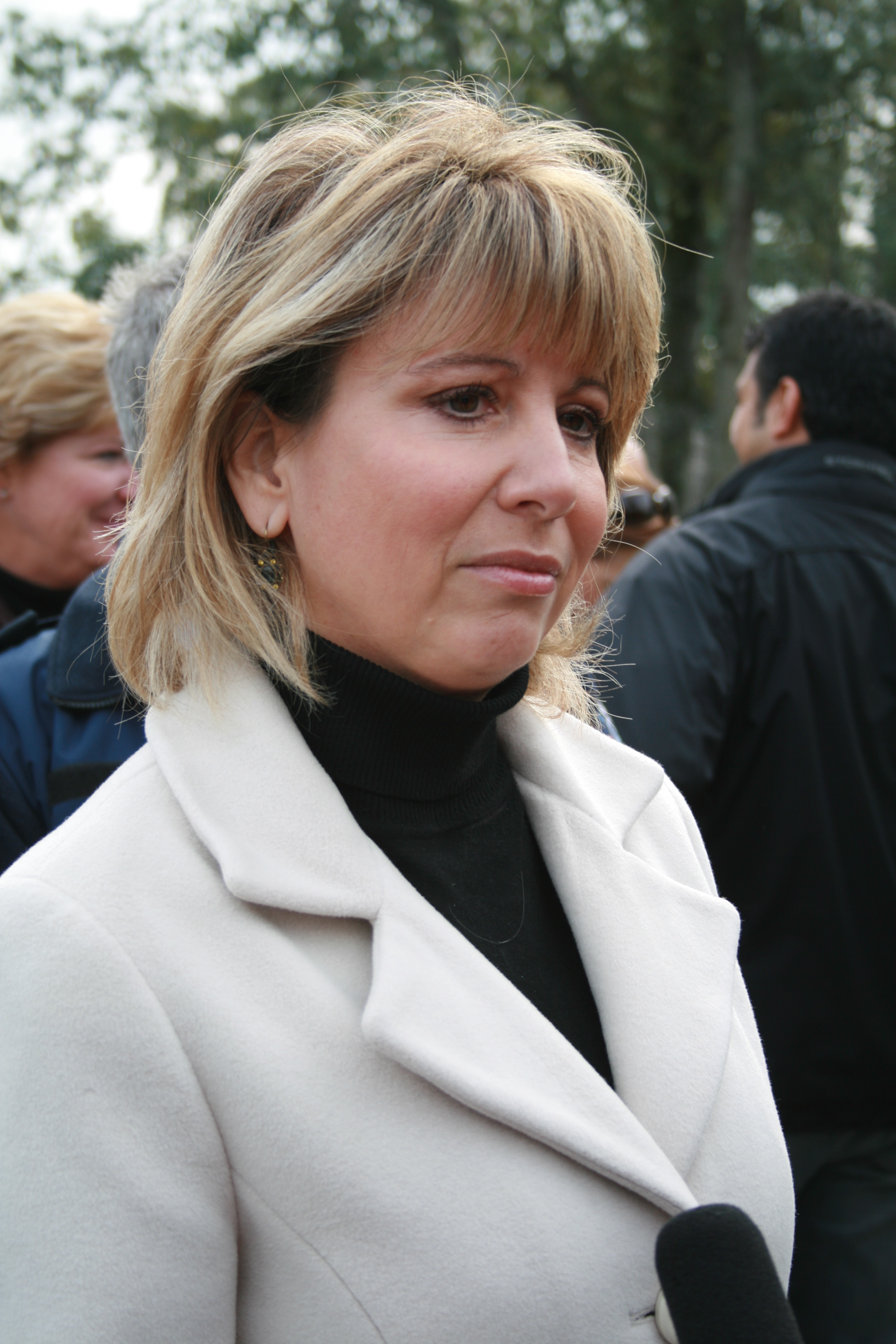

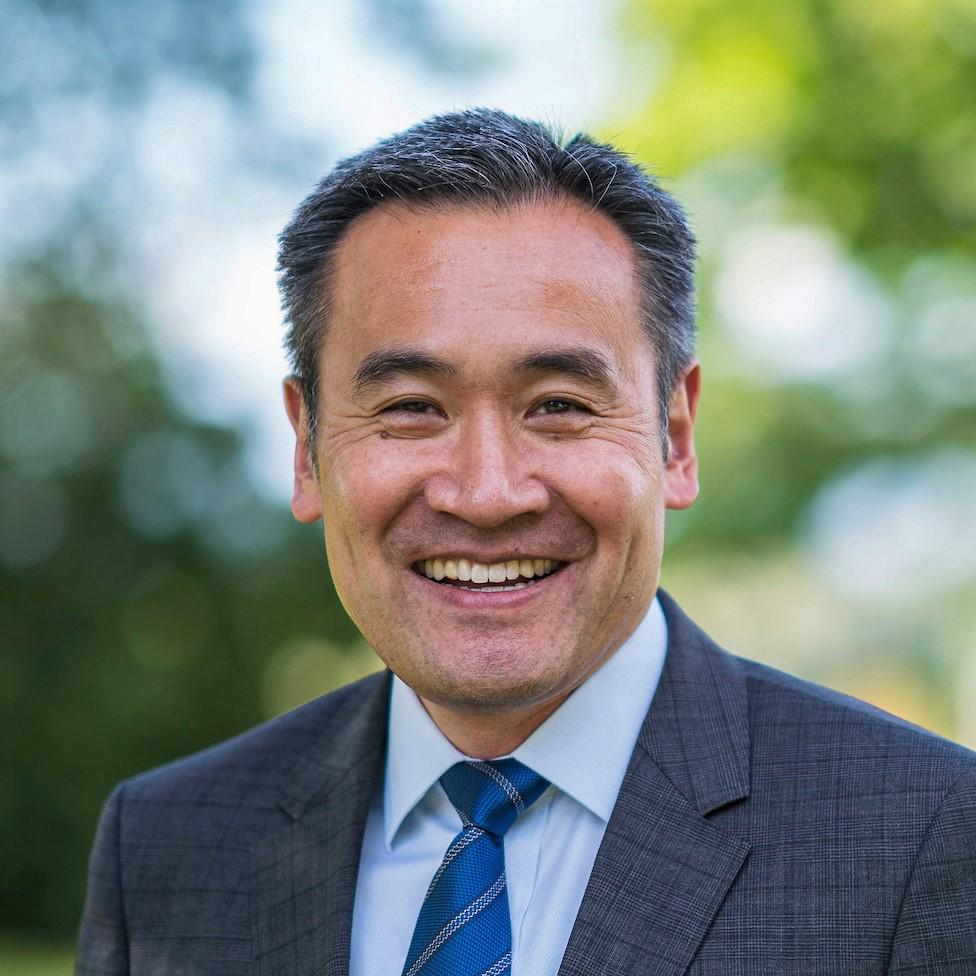
Candidate	Andrew Wilkinson	Dianne Watts	Michael Lee
Last ballot points	4621.29 (53.12%)	4078.71 (46.88%)	Eliminated
First ballot points	1591.46 (18.29%)	2135.13 (24.54%)	1916.68 (22.03%)
Leader before election
Christy Clark
Elected Leader
Andrew Wilkinson

2018 British Columbia Liberal Party leadership election
- Date: February 3, 2018
- Convention: Vancouver
- Resigning leader: Christy Clark
- Won by: Andrew Wilkinson
- Ballots: 5
- Candidates: 6
- Entrance fee: $60,000
- Spending limit: $600,000

A British Columbia Liberal Party leadership election was held on February 3, 2018, due to the resignation of Christy Clark as Liberal leader on August 4, 2017. Rich Coleman was elected interim leader.

Former Attorney General Andrew Wilkinson was elected over former federal Conservative Party MP Dianne Watts on the fifth ballot by 6.24 %. Wilkinson had come in fifth on the first ballot and trailed Watts on all but the final ballot.

== Background ==
Under leaders Gordon Campbell and Christy Clark, the BC Liberal Party governed the province from 2001 until June 2017. In May 2017, the provincial election resulted in a hung parliament, with the Liberals holding 43 seats, one short of the 44 required for a majority. Clark initially formed a minority government, but resigned as premier after being defeated in a confidence vote by an alliance of the British Columbia New Democratic Party and Green Party of British Columbia. On July 28, 2017, Clark announced that she would resign as party leader and as MLA for Kelowna West on August 4. The BC Liberal Caucus selected Rich Coleman, MLA for Langley East, as interim leader, to serve until a permanent leader can be chosen.

== Procedure ==
Party president Sharon White released a statement on Clark's resignation on the same day it was announced. This statement specified that the exact timeline and details of the leadership election process would be finalized within 28 days. As per the party's constitution, the election will give all party members a vote, but will give equal weight to all 87 constituencies in tallying the results. A preferential (ranked) ballot will be used with voting conducted online and by phone.

== Timeline ==
- May 9, 2017 – In the general election, the BC Liberals held the largest number of seats (43), ahead of the NDP (41) and Greens (3), but were one seat short of forming a majority in the Legislative Assembly.
- May 29, 2017 – The Green Party of British Columbia, which held the balance of power in the legislature, reached a confidence and supply agreement with the official opposition NDP.
- June 29, 2017 – Clark's minority government was defeated 44–42 on motion of non-confidence by the NDP-Green alliance. Subsequently, Lieutenant Governor Judith Guichon turned down Clark's request for a snap election, despite Clark's argument that the legislature would be dysfunctional due to the Speaker frequently having to cast the tie-breaking vote, and instead asked NDP leader John Horgan to form a minority government.
- July 18, 2017 – John Horgan is sworn in as premier leading an NDP minority government.
- July 28, 2017 – Clark announced her resignation as Liberal leader effective August 4, 2017. Rich Coleman is elected interim leader by the party's caucus. The Liberal Party executive is to meet within 28 days to decide a timeline for the leadership election which is expected to occur within a year, and in as short a period as three months.
- August 29, 2017 – Nomination period opens.
- September 21, 2017 – Sam Sullivan declares his candidacy.
- September 24, 2017 – Dianne Watts announces her candidacy.
- September 25, 2017 – Andrew Wilkinson and Mike Bernier announce their candidacies.
- September 26, 2017 – Mike de Jong and Mike Lee declare their candidacies.
- September 29, 2017 – Official leadership event scheduled for Vancouver.
- October 10, 2017 – Todd Stone announces his candidacy.
- October 14, 2017 – Bernier withdraws, endorses de Jong.
- October 15, 2017 – First leadership debate, held in Surrey, British Columbia
- December 29, 2017, at 5 pm – Nomination deadline and deadline to become a member of the party and be eligible to vote.
- February 1, 2018, at 9 am – voting begins.
- February 3, 2018, at 5 pm – voting ends, results of the first ballot were announced at a convention in Vancouver at approximately 6 pm.

== Declared candidates ==
=== Mike de Jong ===
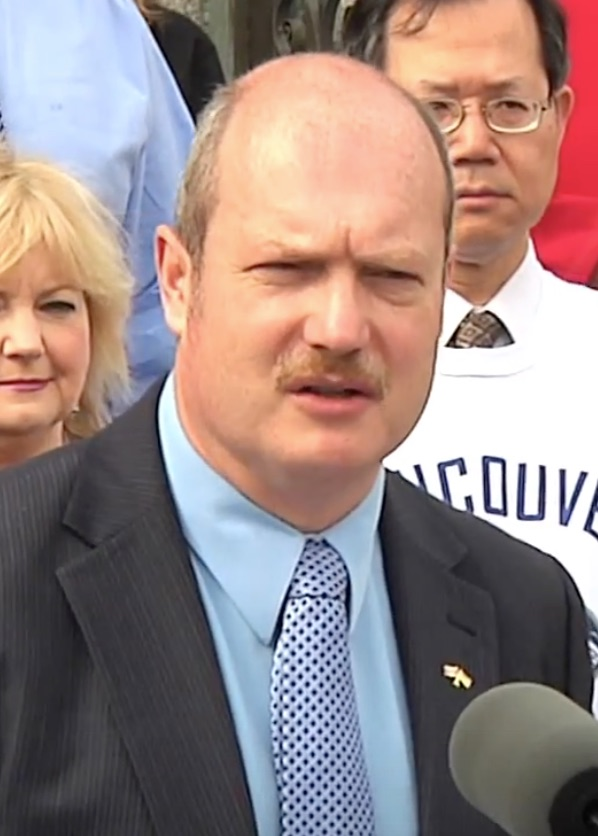
Mike de Jong

Background

Mike de Jong is the MLA for Abbotsford West and formerly for the Abbotsford-Mount Lehman and Matsqui electoral districts (since 1994). He was a cabinet minister throughout BC Liberals 16 years in power under Premiers Campbell and Clark, serving as Minister of Finance (2012–17), Minister of Health (2011–12), Solicitor General (2010), Attorney General (2009–10), Minister of Aboriginal Relations and Reconciliation (2006–09), Minister of Labour and Citizens' Services (2005–06), Minister of Forests (2001–05) and Government House Leader. He was previously a candidate for leader in the 2011 Leadership Election and placed fourth.

Date candidacy declared: September 26, 2017
Campaign website: Official Website
Endorsements

- MLAs: (6) Mike Bernier (Peace River South, since 2013; cabinet minister 2015–2017), Stephanie Cadieux (Surrey South, since 2017; cabinet minister 2012–2017), Rich Coleman (Langley East, since 1996; cabinet minister 2001–2017), Simon Gibson (Abbotsford-Mission, since 2013), John Martin (Chilliwack, since 2013), Teresa Wat (Richmond North Centre, since 2013; cabinet minister, 2013–17) Dan Davies – Peace River North.
- MPs: Ed Fast, MP for Abbotsford since 2005.
- Municipal politicians: Bill Streeper (Mayor of Northern Rockies Regional Municipality since 2009)
- Former MLAs:(7) Pat Bell (Prince George-Mackenzie, 2001–13; cabinet minister, 2004–13), Ron Cantelon (Parksville-Qualicum, 2005–2013), Gulzar Cheema (Surrey-Panorama Ridge, 2001–2004), Patty Sahota (Burnaby-Edmonds, 2001–2005), Jack Weisgerber (Peace River South, 1986–2001; Social Credit cabinet minister 1988–1991; BC Reform Party leader 1996–2001), Rob Nijjar (Vancouver-Kingsway, 2001–2005), Bill Barisoff (Penticton, 1996–2013; Speaker of the Legislature, 2005–13; cabinet minister, 2001–05).

Other information
Proposes an all-day kindergarten program for four-year-olds, financial incentives for local governments who can complete zoning and permitting processes related to 50 residential units or fewer within 10 months, relocating government offices related to forest and lands ministry to Prince George.

=== Michael Lee ===
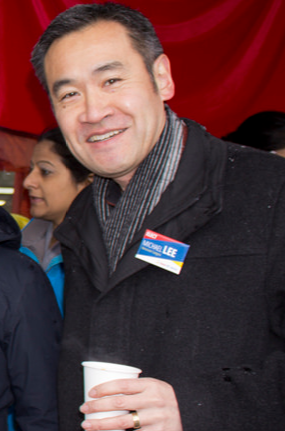
Michael Lee

Background

Michael Lee is the MLA for Vancouver-Langara (since 2017). He is a lawyer by profession, a former partner at Lawson Lundell LLP and was formerly a special assistant to Progressive Conservative Prime Minister Kim Campbell.

Date candidacy declared: September 26, 2017
Campaign website: Official Website
Endorsements

- MLAs:
- MPs: Sukh Dhaliwal (Surrey—Newton, 2006–11 & Since 2015)
- Former MLAs: Suzanne Anton (Vancouver-Fraserview, 2013–17; cabinet minister 2013–17)
- Former MPs: Art Lee former Liberal MP and former BC Liberal leader.
- Other prominent individuals: Jim Benninger (2017 candidate for Courtenay-Comox), Alana DeLong (2017 candidate for Nanaimo-North Cowichan, Alberta Progressive Conservative MLA for Calgary-Bow 2001–15, 2006 Alberta Progressive Conservative Leadership candidate), Alex Dutton (2017 candidate for Oak Bay-Gordon Head, Mark Marissen, prominent Liberal Party of Canada strategist and the ex-husband of Christy Clark, Puneet Sandhar (2017 candidate for Surrey-Panorama)

Other information
Proposes to eliminate LNG tax, complete the Site C dam, build rapid transit beneath the Broadway Corridor to UBC, phase out the use of disposable plastic grocery bags, increase the deposit on all beverage containers, create an enhanced internship tax credit, and increase funding and access to legal aid.

=== Todd Stone ===
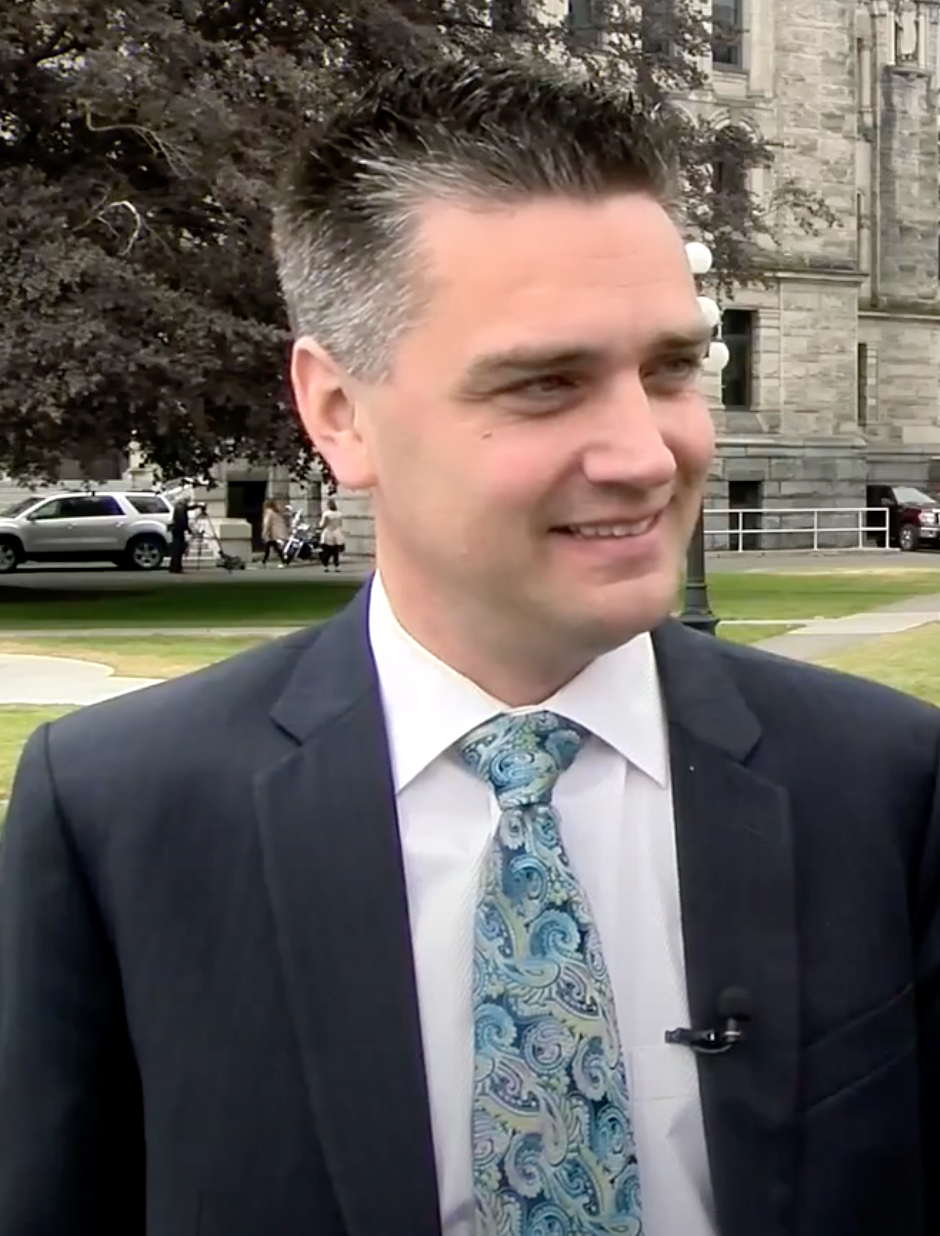
Todd Stone

Background

Todd Stone is the MLA for Kamloops-South Thompson (since 2013). He has served as Minister of Transportation and Infrastructure (2013–2017), Minister Responsible for Emergency Management BC (2015–2017) and Deputy Government House Leader (2013–2017).

Date candidacy declared: October 10, 2017
Campaign website: Official Website
Endorsements

- MLAs: (7) Greg Kyllo (Shuswap, since 2013), Peter Milobar (Kamloops-North Thompson, since 2017), Coralee Oakes (Cariboo North, since 2013; cabinet 2013–17), Ian Paton (Delta South, since 2017), Linda Reid (Richmond South Centre, since 1991; cabinet minister 2001–09; deputy speaker 2009–13; Speaker 2013–17), Jane Thornthwaite (North Vancouver-Seymour, since 2009), Steve Thomson (Kelowna-Mission, since 2009)
- Municipal politicians: (12) Lois Jackson (Mayor of Delta), Alice Maitland (Mayor of Hazelton), Rob MacDougall (Mayor of Fort St James), Terry Rysz (Mayor of Sicamous), Kevin Acton (Mayor of Lumby), Janice Brown (Mayor of Spallumcheen), James Baker (Mayor of Lake Country), Greg McCune (Mayor of Enderby), John Harwood (Mayor of Clearwater), Rick Berrigan (Mayor of Chase), Mark McKee (Mayor of Revelstoke), Chris Beach (Mayor of Burns Lake),
- Senators: (1) Nancy Greene Raine (Senator for BC, since 2009)
- Former MLAs: (12) Susan Brice (Saanich South, 2001–05; cabinet 2004–05), Peter Fassbender (Surrey-Fleetwood, 2013–17; cabinet minister 2013–17), Kevin Krueger (Kamloops-South Thompson and Kamloops-North Thompson, 1996–2013; cabinet minister 2007–13), Terry Lake (Kamloops-North Thompson, 2009–17; cabinet minister 2011–17), Don McRae (Comox Valley, 2009–17; cabinet 2011–17), Sheila Orr (Victoria-Hillside, 2001–05), Barry Penner (Chilliwack-Hope, Chilliwack-Kent, and Chilliwack (electoral district), 1996–2011; cabinet 2005–11), Claude Richmond (Kamloops, 1981–91 (Social Credit) and 2001–09; cabinet 1986–91 and 2005–08; Speaker 2001–05), Bud Smith (Kamloops, 1986–91 (Social Credit); cabinet 1988–90), Scott Hamilton (Delta North, 2013–2017), Wendy McMahon (Columbia River-Revelstoke, 2001–2005), Douglas Horne (Coquitlam-Burke Mountain, 2009–2015) Gordon Wilson, (Powell River-Sunshine Coast, 1991–2001) former BC Liberal Leader (1987–1993)
- Other prominent individuals: Greg Blain (Chief of the Ashcroft Indian Band) Dan Doyle, former Chief of Staff to Christy Clark (2012–2014), John Dyble, former Deputy to the Premier and Cabinet Secretary

Other information
Proposes to eliminate the hospital capital tax, create an agricultural electricity rate, double the Rural Dividend Fund, expand the teaching of coding in elementary and high school, delivering government programs and services online, increasing support to Buy Local campaigns and agricultural fairs, expanding trade offices in Asia, provide support for an agriplex in the Comox Valley.

=== Sam Sullivan ===
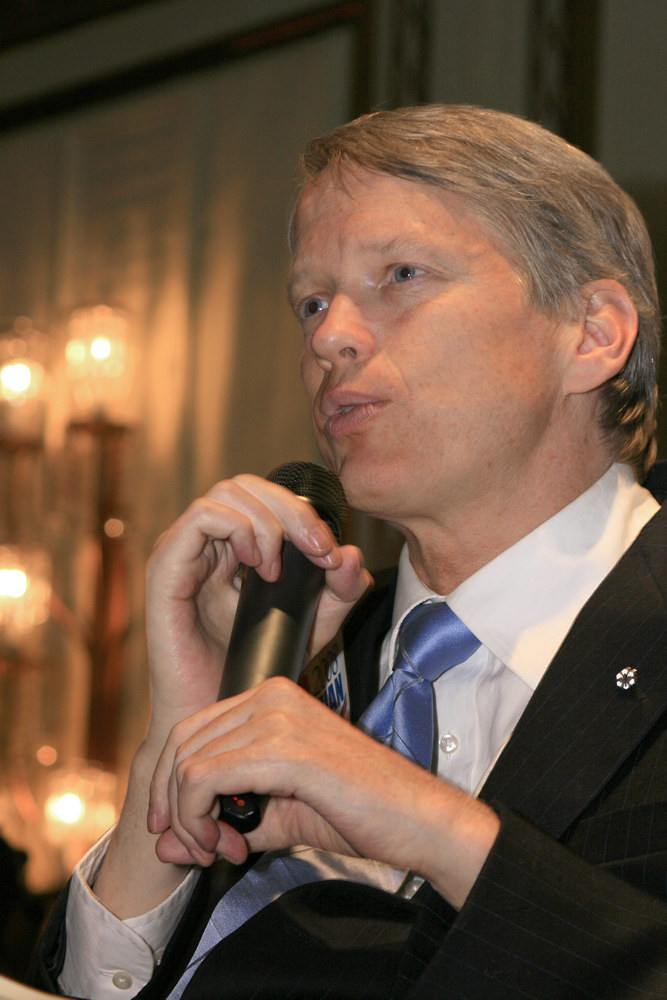
Sam Sullivan

Background

Sam Sullivan is the MLA for Vancouver-False Creek (since 2013), former Minister of Communities, Sport and Cultural Development with responsibility for Translink (2017), and former Mayor of Vancouver (2005–08). He has also been president of the Global Civic Policy Society and an adjunct professor with the UBC School of Architecture and Landscape Architecture.

Date candidacy declared: September 21, 2017
Campaign website: Official Website
Other information
Proposes to privatize the Liquor Distribution Branch and elements of the health care system, introduce charter schools to BC, create a modified sales tax to replace the provincial sales tax.

=== Dianne Watts ===
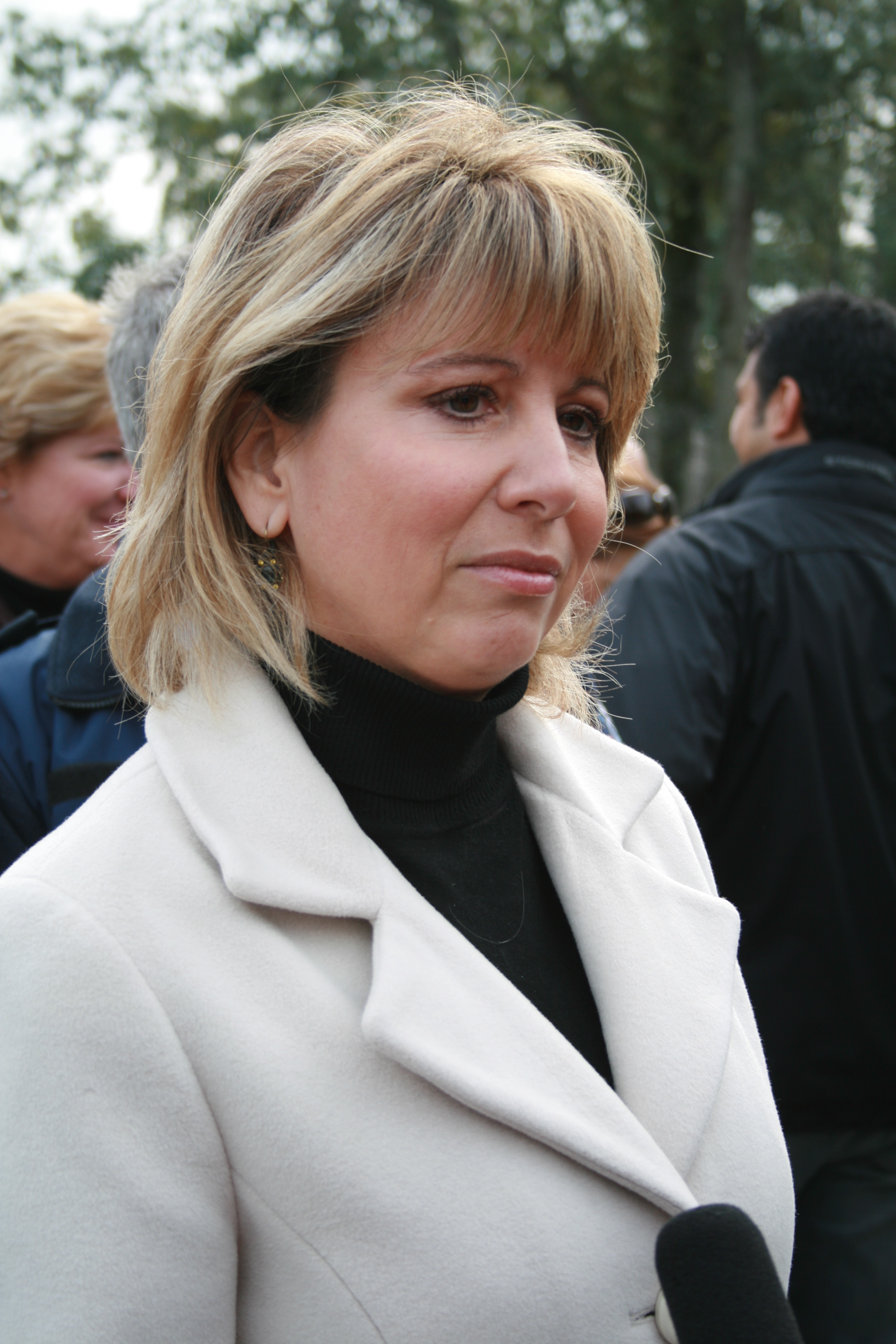
Dianne Watts

Background

Dianne Watts was the Conservative MP for South Surrey—White Rock (2015–17), and former Mayor of Surrey (2005–14)

Date candidacy declared: September 24, 2017
Campaign website: Official Website
Endorsements

- MPs: (1) Erin O'Toole (Durham, ON)
- Senators: (1) Yonah Martin (British Columbia)
- Municipal politicians: (3) Lori Ackerman (Mayor of Fort St. John), Tom Gill (Surrey City Councillor), Nelson Kinney (Prince Rupert City Councillor)
- Former MLAs: (3) Murray Coell (Saanich North and the Islands, 1996–2013), Greg Halsey-Brandt (Richmond Centre, 2001–2005), Olga Ilich (Richmond Centre, 2005–2009; cabinet minister, 2005–2008)
- Former municipal politicians: (1) Evelina Halsey-Brandt (Richmond City Councillor, 2001–2014)
- Other prominent individuals: (1) Lucy Sager (Businesswoman, former BC Liberal leadership contestant)
- Media: (1) Kevin Diakiw (Surrey Now-Leader Columnist)

=== Andrew Wilkinson ===
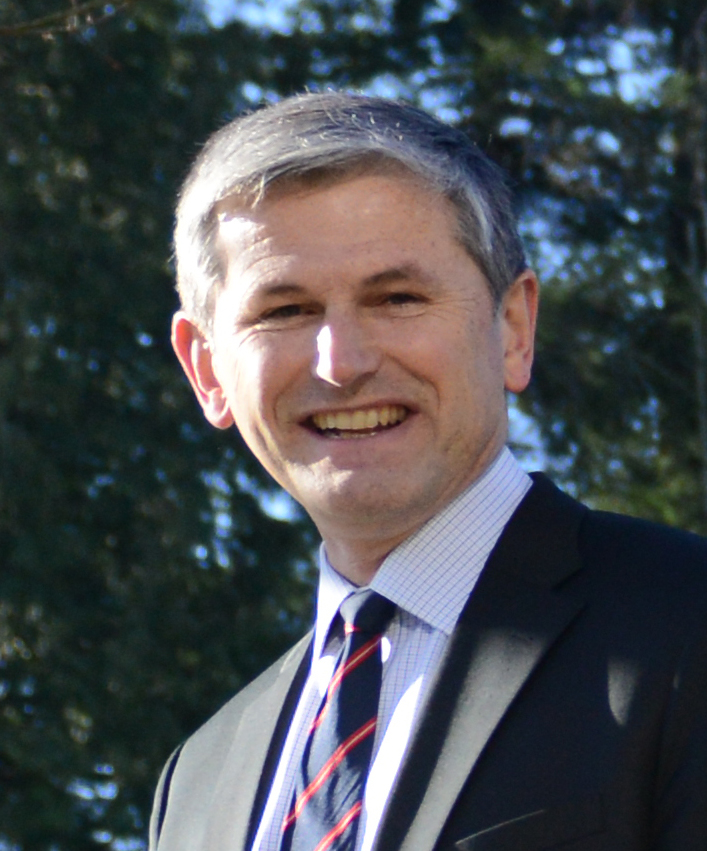
Andrew Wilkinson

Background

Andrew Wilkinson is the MLA for Vancouver-Quilchena (since 2013), and former Attorney General (2017), Minister of Advanced Education (2014–17) and Minister of Technology, Innovation and Citizens' Services (2013–14). He also served as Deputy Minister of Economic Development (2003–06) and Deputy Minister for Intergovernmental Relations (2001–03). He is a doctor and a lawyer by profession, and a former Rhodes Scholar.

Date candidacy declared: September 25, 2017
Campaign website: Official Website
Endorsements

- MLAs: (13) Donna Barnett (Cariboo-Chilcotin, since 2009; cabinet minister 2016–17), Doug Clovechok (Columbia River-Revelstoke, since 2017), Joan Isaacs (Coquitlam-Burke Mountain, since 2017), Linda Larson (Boundary-Similkameen), since 2013), Norm Letnick (Kelowna-Lake Country, since 2009; cabinet minister 2012–17), Mike Morris (Prince George-Mackenzie, since 2013; cabinet minister; 2015–17), Mary Polak (Langley, since 2005; cabinet minister 2008–17), Tracy Redies (Surrey-White Rock, since 2017), Ellis Ross (Skeena, since 2017), John Rustad (Nechako Lakes, since 2005; cabinet minister 2013–2017), Tom Shypitka (Kootenay East, since 2017), Michelle Stilwell (Parksville-Qualicum, since 2013; cabinet minister, 2015–17), Laurie Throness (Chilliwack-Kent, since 2013)
- Municipal politicians: Paul Ives, Mayor of Comox (since 2008)
- Former MLAs: (2) Bill Bennett (Kootenay East, 2001–2017), Linda Reimer (Port Moody-Coquitlam)

Other information
Proposes to privatize government-owned liquor stores, abolish the small business income tax for family businesses, create an office to attract American investment to BC, and create a northern premier and cabinet office in Prince George with video-conferencing services to representatives in Victoria.

== Withdrawn candidates ==
=== Mike Bernier ===
Background

Mike Bernier is the MLA for Peace River South (since 2013), former Minister of Education (2015–17), and former councillor (2005–08) and mayor (2008–13) of Dawson Creek.

Endorsements

- MLAs: (1) Dan Davies (Peace River North, since 2017)

Date candidacy declared: September 25, 2017
Campaign website: Official Website
Date withdrawn: October 14, 2017
Subsequently endorsed: Mike de Jong
Reason: Bernier withdrew citing an inability to amass support in the Lower Mainland. Supported de Jong based on de Jong's experience.

=== Lucy Sager ===
Background

Lucy Sager is a businesswoman who lives in Terrace.
Date candidacy declared: September 20, 2017
Campaign website: Official Website
Date withdrawn: November 2, 2017
Subsequently endorsed: Dianne Watts
Reason: Sager withdrew citing her belief that Watts would give the best chance to defeat the NDP.

== Declined ==
- George Abbott, MLA for Shuswap (1996–2013), former Minister of Health and Minister of Education, 2011 leadership candidate.
- Iain Black, MLA for Port Moody-Westwood (2005–2011), former Minister of Labour, Minister of Labour and Citizens Services, and Minister of Small Business, Technology and Economic Development.
- Rich Coleman, interim leader, MLA for Langley East (previously Fort Langley-Aldergrove) (1996–2020), and former Deputy Premier (2012–2017).
- Herb Dhaliwal, Liberal MP for Vancouver South (1993–1997) and Vancouver South—Burnaby (1997–2004), former federal Minister of National Revenue, Minister of Fisheries and Oceans and Minister of Natural Resources.
- Peter Fassbender, MLA for Surrey-Fleetwood (2013–2017), Mayor of Langley (2005–2013)
- Kevin Falcon, financial executive, former MLA for Surrey-Cloverdale, Deputy Premier, and BC Liberal leadership candidate (2011).
- Gurmant Grewal, Conservative MP for Newton—North Delta (1997–2006).
- Jas Johal, MLA for Richmond-Queensborough (2017–2020), former broadcaster
- James Moore, Conservative MP for Port Moody—Coquitlam—Port Coquitlam (2000–2004) and Port Moody—Westwood—Port Coquitlam (2004–2015), former federal Minister of Industry and Minister of Canadian Heritage and Official Languages.
- Michelle Stilwell, MLA for Parksville-Qualicum (2013–2020), Minister of Social Development and Social Innovation (2015–2017)
- Carole Taylor, former MLA for Vancouver-Langara, former Finance Minister (2005–2008), former chair of the Canadian Broadcasting Corporation (2001–2005)

== Opinion polls ==
=== All British Columbians ===
Date(s) administered	Polling firm/Link	Sample size	Margin of error	Mike de Jong	Michael Lee	Todd Stone	Sam Sullivan	Dianne Watts	Andrew Wilkinson	Other/ Undecided
January 3–4, 2018		817	± 3.24%	13.4%	8.6%	16.5%	1.8%	25.8%	18.1%	15.7%

== Results ==
= Eliminated from next round
= Winner

Candidate	Ballot 1		Ballot 2				Ballot 3				Ballot 4				Ballot 5			
Name	Votes	Points	Votes	+/-	Points	+/-	Votes	+/-	Points	+/-	Votes	+/-	Points	+/-	Votes	+/-	Points	+/-
Andrew Wilkinson	4828; 15.69%	1591.46; 18.29%	4928; 16.05%	100; 0.36%	1630.98; 18.75%	39.52; 0.46%	6436; 22.39%	1508; 6.34%	2202.30; 25.29%	571.33; 6.54%	7832; 29.22%	1396; 6.83%	2863.51; 32.91%	661.21; 7.62%	12509; 53.76%	4677; 24.54%	4621.29; 53.12%	1757.78; 20.21%
Dianne Watts	7449; 24.20%	2135.13; 24.54%	7537; 24.54%	88; 0.34%	2167.49; 24.91%	32.36; 0.37%	8036; 27.95%	499; 3.41%	2470.62; 28.38%	303.13; 3.47%	9130; 34.06%	1094; 6.11%	3006.96; 34.56%	536.34; 6.18%	10761; 46.24%	1631; 12.18%	4078.71; 46.88%	1071.75; 12.32%
Michael Lee	8100; 26.32%	1916.68; 22.03%	8206; 26.72%	106; 0.40%	1956.29; 22.49%	39.60; 0.46%	8614; 29.96%	408; 3.24%	2261.09; 26.03%	304.80; 3.54%	9842; 36.72%	1228; 6.76%	2829.53; 32.52%	568.44; 6.49%	eliminated			
Todd Stone	5073; 16.48%	1483.48; 17.05%	5134; 16.72%	61; 0.23%	1504.69; 17.30%	21.21; 0.25%	5664; 19.70%	530; 2.98%	1765.98; 20.29%	261.30; 2.99%	eliminated							
Mike de Jong	4837; 15.72%	1415.13; 16.27%	4906; 15.97%	69; 0.26%	1440.56; 16.56%	25.43; 0.29%	eliminated											
Sam Sullivan	488; 1.59%	158.11; 1.82%	eliminated															
TOTAL	30775	8700	30711	−64	8700	-	28750	−1961	8700	-	26804	−1946	8700	-	23270	−3534	8700	-

=== Riding results ===
City of Vancouver
Vancouver East	Ballot 1							Ballot 2						Ballot 3					Ballot 4				Ballot 5		
Riding MLA (supported)	de Jong	Lee	Stone	Sull-ivan	Watts	Wilk-inson	Total	de Jong	Lee	Stone	Watts	Wilk-inson	Total	Lee	Stone	Watts	Wilk-inson	Total	Lee	Watts	Wilk-inson	Total	Watts	Wilk-inson	Total
Vancouver-Fraserview	43.33 (182)	23.33 (98)	6.19 (26)	1.19 (5)	18.57 (78)	7.38 (31)	(420)	43.44 (182) +0.11 (+0)	23.87 (100) +0.54 (+2)	6.44 (27) +0.25 (+1)	18.62 (78) +0.05 (+0)	7.64 (32) +0.26 (+1)	(419) (−1)	40.07 (111) +16.20 (+11)	11.55 (32) +5.11 (+5)	29.60 (82) +10.98 (+4)	18.77 (52) +11.13 (+20)	(277) (−142)	45.91 (118) +5.84 (+7)	33.07 (85) +3.47 (+3)	21.01 (54) +2.24 (+2)	(257) (−20)	59.70 (120) +26.63 (+35)	40.30 (81) +19.29 (+27)	(201) (−56)
Vancouver-Hastings	13.38 (19)	23.94 (34)	10.56 (15)	7.75 (11)	30.28 (43)	14.08 (20)	(142)	15.83 (22) +2.45 (+3)	25.18 (35) +1.24 (+1)	10.79 (15) +0.23 (+0)	31.65 (44) +1.37 (+1)	16.55 (23) +2.47 (+3)	(139) (−3)	29.20 (40) +4.02 (+5)	13.14 (18) +2.35 (+3)	35.04 (48) +3.39 (+4)	22.63 (31) +6.08 (+8)	(137) (−2)	35.16 (45) +5.96 (+5)	39.06 (50) +4.02 (+2)	25.78 (33) +3.15 (+2)	(128) (−9)	48.31 (57) +9.25 (+7)	51.69 (61) +25.91 (+28)	(118) (−10)
Vancouver-Kensington	38.11 (101)	24.15 (64)	15.47 (41)	1.13 (3)	15.47 (41)	5.66 (15)	(265)	38.11 (101) +0.00 (+0)	24.91 (66) +0.76 (+2)	15.47 (41) +0.00 (+0)	15.85 (42) +0.38 (+1)	5.66 (15) +0.00 (+0)	(265) (0)	38.95 (67) +14.04 (+1)	24.42 (42) +8.95 (+1)	26.16 (45) +10.31 (+3)	10.47 (18) +4.81 (+3)	(172) (−93)	52.94 (81) +13.99 (+14)	32.03 (49) +5.87 (+4)	15.03 (23) +4.56 (+5)	(153) (−19)	49.58 (59) +17.55 (+10)	50.42 (60) +35.39 (+37)	(119) (−34)
Vancouver-Kingsway	31.41 (60)	45.03 (86)	4.71 (9)	1.57 (3)	10.99 (21)	6.28 (12)	(191)	31.41 (60) +0.00 (+0)	46.07 (88) +1.04 (+2)	4.71 (9) +0.00 (+0)	10.99 (21) +0.00 (+0)	6.81 (13) +0.53 (+1)	(191) (0)	61.69 (95) +15.62 (+7)	7.14 (11) +2.43 (+2)	15.58 (24) +4.59 (+3)	15.58 (24) +8.77 (+11)	(154) (−37)	64.86 (96) +3.17 (+1)	17.57 (26) +1.99 (+2)	17.57 (26) +1.99 (+2)	(148) (−6)	37.76 (37) +20.19 (+11)	62.24 (61) +44.67 (+35)	(98) (−50)
Vancouver-Mount Pleasant	18.94 (25)	25.00 (33)	9.85 (13)	7.58 (10)	23.48 (31)	15.15 (20)	(132)	19.23 (25) +0.29 (+0)	29.23 (38) +4.23 (+5)	10.00 (13) +0.15 (+0)	23.85 (31) +0.37 (+0)	17.69 (23) +2.54 (+3)	(130) (−2)	35.90 (42) +6.67 (+4)	11.97 (14) +1.97 (+1)	28.21 (33) +4.36 (+2)	23.93 (28) +6.24 (+5)	(117) (−13)	39.47 (45) +3.57 (+3)	31.58 (36) +3.37 (+3)	28.95 (33) +5.02 (+5)	(114) (−3)	50.00 (46) +18.42 (+10)	50.00 (46) +21.05 (+13)	(92) (−22)
Vancouver West	Ballot 1							Ballot 2						Ballot 3					Ballot 4				Ballot 5		
Riding MLA (supported)	de Jong	Lee	Stone	Sull-ivan	Watts	Wilk-inson	Total	de Jong	Lee	Stone	Watts	Wilk-inson	Total	Lee	Stone	Watts	Wilk-inson	Total	Lee	Watts	Wilk-inson	Total	Watts	Wilk-inson	Total
Vancouver-Fairview	6.77 (30)	20.32 (90)	22.35 (99)	5.87 (26)	22.80 (101)	21.90 (97)	(443)	7.95 (35) +1.18 (+5)	21.36 (94) +1.04 (+4)	22.73 (100) +0.38 (+1)	25.23 (111) +2.43 (+10)	22.73 (100) +0.83 (+3)	(440) (−3)	22.27 (96) +0.91 (+2)	24.59 (106) +1.86 (+6)	26.45 (114) +1.22 (+3)	26.68 (115) +3.95 (+15)	(431) (−9)	32.44 (133) +10.17 (+37)	32.68 (134) +6.23 (+20)	34.88 (143) +8.20 (+28)	(410) (−21)	46.67 (175) +13.99 (+41)	53.33 (200) +18.45 (+57)	(375) (−35)
Vancouver-False Creek; Sam Sullivan (Sullivan)	9.30 (36)	21.96 (85)	12.14 (47)	12.40 (48)	25.84 (100)	18.35 (71)	(387)	10.79 (41) +1.49 (+5)	24.47 (93) +2.51 (+8)	14.47 (55) +2.33 (+8)	27.89 (106) +2.05 (+6)	22.37 (85) +4.02 (+14)	(380) (−7)	26.33 (99) +1.86 (+6)	17.29 (65) +2.82 (+10)	30.32 (114) +2.43 (+8)	26.06 (98) +3.69 (+13)	(376) (−4)	33.14 (117) +6.81 (+18)	35.69 (126) +5.37 (+12)	31.16 (110) +5.10 (+12)	(353) (−23)	53.53 (167) +17.84 (+41)	46.47 (145) +15.31 (+35)	(312) (−41)
Vancouver-Langara; Michael Lee (Lee)	21.34 (162)	48.62 (369)	8.56 (65)	1.58 (12)	11.99 (91)	7.91 (60)	(759)	21.66 (164) +0.32 (+2)	49.01 (371) +0.39 (+2)	8.85 (67) +0.29 (+2)	12.55 (95) +0.56 (+4)	7.93 (60) +0.02 (+0)	(757) (−2)	61.55 (381) +12.54 (+10)	12.44 (77) +3.59 (+10)	15.67 (97) +3.12 (+2)	10.34 (64) +2.41 (+4)	(619) (−138)	67.79 (402) +6.24 (+21)	17.03 (101) +1.36 (+4)	15.18 (90) +4.84 (+26)	(593) (−26)	47.63 (161) +30.60 (+60)	52.37 (177) +37.19 (+87)	(338) (−255)
Vancouver-Point Grey	7.01 (35)	36.67 (183)	8.22 (41)	4.41 (22)	22.44 (112)	21.24 (106)	(499)	7.46 (37) +0.45 (+2)	37.70 (187) +1.03 (+4)	9.07 (45) +0.85 (+4)	23.39 (116) +0.95 (+4)	22.38 (111) +1.14 (+5)	(496) (−3)	39.51 (194) +1.81 (+7)	10.39 (51) +1.32 (+6)	24.24 (119) +0.85 (+3)	25.87 (127) +3.49 (+16)	(491) (−5)	44.12 (214) +4.61 (+20)	27.01 (131) +2.77 (+12)	28.87 (140) +3.00 (+13)	(485) (−6)	46.81 (169) +19.80 (+38)	53.19 (192) +24.32 (+52)	(361) (−124)
Vancouver-Quilchena; Andrew Wilkinson (Wilkinson)	5.56 (54)	38.21 (371)	6.18 (60)	2.06 (20)	15.24 (148)	32.75 (318)	(971)	5.57 (54) +0.01 (+0)	39.07 (379) +0.86 (+8)	6.49 (63) +0.31 (+3)	15.57 (151) +0.33 (+3)	33.30 (323) +0.55 (+5)	(970) (−1)	40.70 (383) +1.63 (+4)	6.91 (65) +0.42 (+2)	17.11 (161) +1.54 (+10)	35.28 (332) +1.98 (+9)	(941) (−29)	42.00 (391) +1.30 (+8)	18.15 (169) +1.04 (+8)	39.85 (371) +4.57 (+39)	(931) (−10)	36.21 (256) +18.06 (+87)	63.79 (451) +23.94 (+80)	(707) (−224)
Vancouver-West End	6.78 (16)	22.46 (53)	15.68 (37)	8.90 (21)	27.12 (64)	19.07 (45)	(236)	7.36 (17) +0.58 (+1)	25.97 (60) +3.51 (+7)	16.45 (38) +0.77 (+1)	29.00 (67) +1.88 (+3)	21.21 (49) +2.14 (+4)	(231) (−5)	27.75 (63) +1.78 (+3)	17.62 (40) +1.17 (+2)	29.96 (68) +0.96 (+1)	24.67 (56) +3.46 (+7)	(227) (−4)	34.23 (76) +6.48 (+13)	34.23 (76) +4.27 (+8)	31.53 (70) +6.86 (+14)	(222) (−5)	47.18 (92) +12.95 (+16)	52.82 (103) +21.29 (+33)	(195) (−27)

Lower Mainland
North Shore	Ballot 1							Ballot 2						Ballot 3					Ballot 4				Ballot 5		
Riding MLA (supported)	de Jong	Lee	Stone	Sull-ivan	Watts	Wilk-inson	Total	de Jong	Lee	Stone	Watts	Wilk-inson	Total	Lee	Stone	Watts	Wilk-inson	Total	Lee	Watts	Wilk-inson	Total	Watts	Wilk-inson	Total
North Vancouver-Lonsdale	10.60 (23)	18.43 (40)	23.96 (52)	3.23 (7)	30.88 (67)	12.90 (28)	(217)	11.06 (24) +0.46 (+1)	18.43 (40) +0.00 (+0)	24.42 (53) +0.46 (+1)	30.88 (67) +0.00 (+0)	15.21 (33) +2.31 (+5)	(217) (0)	20.38 (43) +1.95 (+3)	25.59 (54) +1.17 (+1)	32.70 (69) +1.82 (+2)	21.33 (45) +6.12 (+12)	(211) (−6)	25.76 (51) +5.38 (+8)	41.41 (82) +8.71 (+13)	32.83 (65) +11.50 (+20)	(198) (−13)	52.78 (95) +11.37 (+13)	47.22 (85) +14.39 (+20)	(180) (−18)
North Vancouver-Seymour; Jane Thornthwaite (Stone)	6.13 (19)	14.52 (45)	38.71 (120)	2.26 (7)	24.84 (77)	13.55 (42)	(310)	6.80 (21) +0.67 (+2)	14.56 (45) +0.04 (+0)	39.16 (121) +0.45 (+1)	25.57 (79) +0.73 (+2)	13.92 (43) +0.37 (+1)	(309) (−1)	14.75 (45) +0.19 (+0)	40.66 (124) +1.50 (+3)	26.23 (80) +0.66 (+1)	18.36 (56) +4.44 (+13)	(305) (−4)	26.36 (68) +11.61 (+23)	41.09 (106) +14.86 (+26)	32.56 (84) +14.20 (+28)	(258) (−47)	55.60 (134) +14.51 (+28)	44.40 (107) +11.84 (+23)	(241) (−17)
West Vancouver-Capilano; Ralph Sultan	10.37 (48)	23.11 (107)	16.41 (76)	3.02 (14)	23.97 (111)	23.11 (107)	(463)	10.46 (48) +0.09 (+0)	24.18 (111) +1.07 (+4)	16.99 (78) +0.58 (+2)	24.84 (114) +0.87 (+3)	23.53 (108) +0.42 (+1)	(459) (−4)	26.97 (123) +2.79 (+12)	18.64 (85) +1.65 (+7)	25.44 (116) +0.60 (+2)	28.95 (132) +5.42 (+24)	(456) (−3)	33.41 (149) +6.44 (+26)	30.04 (134) +4.60 (+18)	36.55 (163) +7.60 (+31)	(446) (−10)	46.45 (183) +16.41 (+49)	53.55 (211) +17.00 (+48)	(394) (−52)
West Vancouver-Sea to Sky; Jordan Sturdy	12.14 (38)	25.56 (80)	10.22 (32)	2.56 (8)	29.39 (92)	20.13 (63)	(313)	12.14 (38) +0.00 (+0)	26.20 (82) +0.64 (+2)	10.22 (32) +0.00 (+0)	30.67 (96) +1.28 (+4)	20.77 (65) +0.64 (+2)	(313) (0)	28.67 (84) +2.47 (+2)	13.31 (39) +3.09 (+7)	34.81 (102) +4.14 (+6)	23.21 (68) +2.44 (+3)	(293) (−20)	33.93 (95) +5.26 (+11)	38.21 (107) +3.40 (+5)	27.86 (78) +4.65 (+10)	(280) (−13)	50.78 (130) +12.57 (+23)	49.22 (126) +21.36 (+48)	(256) (−24)
Burnaby, New Westminster, Tri-Cities	Ballot 1							Ballot 2						Ballot 3					Ballot 4				Ballot 5		
Riding MLA (supported)	de Jong	Lee	Stone	Sull-ivan	Watts	Wilk-inson	Total	de Jong	Lee	Stone	Watts	Wilk-inson	Total	Lee	Stone	Watts	Wilk-inson	Total	Lee	Watts	Wilk-inson	Total	Watts	Wilk-inson	Total
Burnaby North	24.07 (58)	30.71 (74)	11.20 (27)	2.90 (7)	25.31 (61)	5.81 (14)	(241)	24.27 (58) +0.20 (+0)	31.80 (76) +1.09 (+2)	11.72 (28) +0.52 (+1)	26.36 (63) +1.05 (+2)	5.86 (14) +0.05 (+0)	(239) (−2)	40.30 (81) +8.50 (+5)	14.43 (29) +2.71 (+1)	35.32 (71) +8.96 (+8)	9.95 (20) +4.09 (+6)	(201) (−38)	45.16 (84) +4.86 (+3)	41.40 (77) +6.08 (+6)	13.44 (25) +3.49 (+5)	(186) (−15)	65.03 (93) +23.63 (+16)	34.97 (50) +21.53 (+25)	(143) (−43)
Burnaby-Deer Lake	21.33 (61)	37.06 (106)	17.83 (51)	0.70 (2)	17.48 (50)	5.59 (16)	(286)	21.68 (62) +0.35 (+1)	37.06 (106) +0.00 (+0)	17.83 (51) +0.00 (+0)	17.83 (51) +0.35 (+1)	5.59 (16) +0.00 (+0)	(286) (0)	45.38 (113) +8.32 (+7)	22.09 (55) +4.26 (+4)	21.69 (54) +3.86 (+3)	10.84 (27) +5.25 (+11)	(249) (−37)	53.64 (118) +8.26 (+5)	26.36 (58) +4.67 (+4)	20.00 (44) +9.16 (+17)	(220) (−29)	50.35 (72) +23.99 (+14)	49.65 (71) +29.65 (+27)	(143) (−77)
Burnaby-Edmonds	40.53 (122)	30.56 (92)	5.32 (16)	0.66 (2)	16.61 (50)	6.31 (19)	(301)	40.53 (122) +0.00 (+0)	30.90 (93) +0.34 (+1)	5.32 (16) +0.00 (+0)	16.94 (51) +0.33 (+1)	6.31 (19) +0.00 (+0)	(301) (0)	49.01 (99) +18.11 (+6)	8.42 (17) +3.10 (+1)	28.22 (57) +11.28 (+6)	14.36 (29) +8.05 (+10)	(202) (−99)	54.12 (105) +5.11 (+6)	29.38 (57) +1.16 (+0)	16.49 (32) +2.13 (+3)	(194) (−8)	63.49 (80) +34.11 (+23)	36.51 (46) +20.02 (+14)	(126) (−68)
Burnaby-Lougheed	24.89 (58)	33.05 (77)	17.17 (40)	3.00 (7)	15.45 (36)	6.44 (15)	(233)	25.97 (60) +1.08 (+2)	33.33 (77) +0.28 (+0)	18.61 (43) +1.44 (+3)	15.58 (36) +0.13 (+0)	6.49 (15) +0.05 (+0)	(231) (−2)	39.60 (80) +6.27 (+3)	22.77 (46) +4.16 (+3)	22.28 (45) +6.70 (+9)	15.35 (31) +8.86 (+16)	(202) (−29)	51.61 (96) +12.01 (+16)	26.88 (50) +4.60 (+5)	21.51 (40) +6.16 (+9)	(186) (−16)	47.73 (63) +20.85 (+13)	52.27 (69) +30.76 (+29)	(132) (−54)
Coquitlam-Burke Mountain; Joan Isaacs (Wilkinson)	12.76 (31)	25.10 (61)	7.82 (19)	0.82 (2)	21.40 (52)	32.10 (78)	(243)	12.76 (31) +0.00 (+0)	25.10 (61) +0.00 (+0)	7.82 (19) +0.00 (+0)	21.40 (52) +0.00 (+0)	32.92 (80) +0.82 (+2)	(243) (0)	26.67 (64) +1.57 (+3)	10.42 (25) +2.60 (+6)	24.17 (58) +2.77 (+6)	38.75 (93) +5.83 (+13)	(240) (−3)	30.93 (73) +4.26 (+9)	26.27 (62) +2.10 (+4)	42.80 (101) +4.05 (+8)	(236) (−4)	36.08 (70) +9.81 (+8)	63.92 (124) +21.12 (+23)	(194) (−42)
Coquitlam-Maillardville	21.79 (39)	30.17 (54)	7.82 (14)	1.12 (2)	31.84 (57)	7.26 (13)	(179)	22.35 (40) +0.56 (+1)	30.17 (54) +0.00 (+0)	7.82 (14) +0.00 (+0)	31.84 (57) +0.00 (+0)	7.82 (14) +0.56 (+1)	(179) (0)	34.32 (58) +4.15 (+4)	10.06 (17) +2.24 (+3)	40.24 (68) +8.40 (+11)	15.38 (26) +7.56 (+12)	(169) (−10)	37.72 (63) +3.40 (+5)	43.71 (73) +3.47 (+5)	18.56 (31) +3.18 (+5)	(167) (−2)	64.18 (86) +20.47 (+13)	35.82 (48) +17.26 (+17)	(134) (−33)
Port Coquitlam	14.08 (20)	24.65 (35)	11.97 (17)	2.11 (3)	34.51 (49)	12.68 (18)	(142)	15.49 (22) +1.41 (+2)	24.65 (35) +0.00 (+0)	12.68 (18) +0.71 (+1)	34.51 (49) +0.00 (+0)	12.68 (18) +0.00 (+0)	(142) (0)	27.74 (38) +3.09 (+3)	13.87 (19) +1.19 (+1)	35.77 (49) +1.26 (+0)	22.63 (31) +9.95 (+13)	(137) (−5)	32.31 (42) +4.57 (+4)	42.31 (55) +6.54 (+6)	25.38 (33) +2.75 (+2)	(130) (−7)	55.65 (64) +13.34 (+9)	44.35 (51) +18.97 (+18)	(115) (−15)
Port Moody-Coquitlam	17.60 (41)	15.02 (35)	15.02 (35)	2.58 (6)	30.47 (71)	19.31 (45)	(233)	17.60 (41) +0.00 (+0)	15.88 (37) +0.86 (+2)	15.02 (35) +0.00 (+0)	31.33 (73) +0.86 (+2)	20.17 (47) +0.86 (+2)	(233) (0)	18.78 (43) +2.90 (+6)	19.21 (44) +4.19 (+9)	34.93 (80) +3.60 (+7)	27.07 (62) +6.90 (+15)	(229) (−4)	26.87 (61) +8.09 (+18)	38.77 (88) +3.84 (+8)	34.36 (78) +7.29 (+16)	(227) (−2)	48.79 (101) +10.02 (+13)	51.21 (106) +16.85 (+28)	(207) (−20)
New Westminster	25.25 (50)	15.15 (30)	7.58 (15)	6.06 (12)	31.82 (63)	14.14 (28)	(198)	25.76 (51) +0.51 (+1)	16.16 (32) +1.01 (+2)	9.09 (18) +1.51 (+3)	32.83 (65) +1.01 (+2)	16.16 (32) +2.02 (+4)	(198) (0)	20.24 (34) +4.08 (+2)	15.48 (26) +6.39 (+8)	39.88 (67) +7.05 (+2)	24.40 (41) +8.24 (+9)	(168) (−30)	25.95 (41) +5.71 (+7)	46.20 (73) +6.32 (+6)	27.85 (44) +3.45 (+3)	(158) (−10)	60.14 (89) +13.94 (+16)	39.86 (59) +12.01 (+15)	(148) (−10)
Richmond, Delta	Ballot 1							Ballot 2						Ballot 3					Ballot 4				Ballot 5		
Riding MLA (supported)	de Jong	Lee	Stone	Sull-ivan	Watts	Wilk-inson	Total	de Jong	Lee	Stone	Watts	Wilk-inson	Total	Lee	Stone	Watts	Wilk-inson	Total	Lee	Watts	Wilk-inson	Total	Watts	Wilk-inson	Total
Delta North	12.41 (85)	43.21 (296)	7.74 (53)	0.44 (3)	26.72 (183)	9.49 (65)	(685)	12.41 (85) +0.00 (+0)	43.36 (297) +0.15 (+1)	7.88 (54) +0.14 (+1)	26.86 (184) +0.14 (+1)	9.49 (65) +0.00 (+0)	(685) (0)	49.20 (308) +5.84 (+11)	9.11 (57) +1.23 (+3)	29.71 (186) +2.85 (+2)	11.98 (75) +2.49 (+10)	(626) (−59)	53.69 (320) +4.49 (+12)	32.38 (193) +2.67 (+7)	13.93 (83) +1.95 (+8)	(596) (−30)	44.18 (224) +11.80 (+31)	55.82 (283) +41.89 (+200)	(507) (−89)
Delta South; Ian Paton (Stone)	9.42 (52)	12.14 (67)	30.43 (168)	1.45 (8)	36.23 (200)	10.33 (57)	(552)	9.62 (53) +0.20 (+1)	12.52 (69) +0.38 (+2)	31.03 (171) +0.60 (+3)	36.30 (200) +0.07 (+0)	10.53 (58) +0.20 (+1)	(551) (−1)	14.13 (76) +1.61 (+7)	33.46 (180) +2.43 (+9)	38.29 (206) +1.99 (+6)	14.13 (76) +3.60 (+18)	(538) (−13)	22.11 (107) +7.98 (+31)	47.73 (231) +9.44 (+25)	30.17 (146) +16.04 (+70)	(484) (−54)	57.91 (260) +10.18 (+29)	42.09 (189) +11.92 (+43)	(449) (−35)
Richmond North Centre; Teresa Wat (de Jong)	19.25 (67)	51.15 (178)	4.02 (14)	0.86 (3)	16.38 (57)	8.33 (29)	(348)	19.25 (67) +0.00 (+0)	51.44 (179) +0.29 (+1)	4.02 (14) +0.00 (+0)	16.67 (58) +0.29 (+1)	8.62 (30) +0.29 (+1)	(348) (0)	58.57 (188) +7.13 (+9)	5.61 (18) +1.59 (+4)	20.56 (66) +3.89 (+8)	15.26 (49) +6.64 (+19)	(321) (−27)	59.43 (189) +0.86 (+1)	21.07 (67) +0.51 (+1)	19.50 (62) +4.24 (+13)	(318) (−3)	54.27 (89) +33.20 (+22)	45.73 (75) +26.23 (+13)	(164) (−154)
Richmond South Centre; Linda Reid (Stone)	8.52 (30)	51.70 (182)	5.40 (19)	0.85 (3)	21.59 (76)	11.93 (42)	(352)	9.09 (32) +0.57 (+2)	51.99 (183) +0.29 (+1)	5.40 (19) +0.00 (+0)	21.59 (76) +0.00 (+0)	11.93 (42) +0.00 (+0)	(352) (0)	55.88 (190) +3.89 (+7)	6.47 (22) +1.07 (+3)	23.82 (81) +2.23 (+5)	13.82 (47) +1.89 (+5)	(340) (−12)	59.35 (200) +3.47 (+10)	24.33 (82) +0.51 (+1)	16.32 (55) +2.50 (+8)	(337) (−3)	55.43 (97) +31.10 (+15)	44.57 (78) +28.25 (+23)	(175) (−162)
Richmond-Queensborough; Jas Johal	23.46 (118)	34.39 (173)	4.37 (22)	0.80 (4)	18.29 (92)	18.69 (94)	(503)	23.51 (118) +0.05 (+0)	34.46 (173) +0.07 (+0)	4.58 (23) +0.21 (+1)	18.53 (93) +0.24 (+1)	18.92 (95) +0.23 (+1)	(502) (−1)	43.74 (185) +9.28 (+12)	6.38 (27) +1.80 (+4)	23.17 (98) +4.64 (+5)	26.71 (113) +7.79 (+18)	(423) (−79)	45.82 (192) +2.08 (+7)	25.54 (107) +2.37 (+9)	28.64 (120) +1.93 (+7)	(419) (−4)	40.53 (137) +14.99 (+30)	59.47 (201) +30.83 (+81)	(338) (−81)
Richmond-Steveston; John Yap	15.24 (50)	38.72 (127)	8.54 (28)	1.22 (4)	29.27 (96)	7.01 (23)	(328)	15.60 (51) +0.36 (+1)	39.14 (128) +0.42 (+1)	8.56 (28) +0.02 (+0)	29.66 (97) +0.39 (+1)	7.03 (23) +0.02 (+0)	(327) (−1)	44.19 (133) +5.05 (+5)	11.63 (35) +3.07 (+7)	33.89 (102) +4.23 (+5)	10.30 (31) +3.27 (+8)	(301) (−26)	49.83 (146) +5.64 (+13)	36.18 (106) +2.29 (+4)	13.99 (41) +3.69 (+10)	(293) (−8)	69.27 (142) +33.09 (+36)	30.73 (63) +16.74 (+22)	(205) (−88)
Surrey	Ballot 1							Ballot 2						Ballot 3					Ballot 4				Ballot 5		
Riding MLA (supported)	de Jong	Lee	Stone	Sull-ivan	Watts	Wilk-inson	Total	de Jong	Lee	Stone	Watts	Wilk-inson	Total	Lee	Stone	Watts	Wilk-inson	Total	Lee	Watts	Wilk-inson	Total	Watts	Wilk-inson	Total
Surrey South; Stephanie Cadieux (de Jong)	9.31 (55)	19.80 (117)	6.94 (41)	1.02 (6)	58.71 (347)	4.23 (25)	(591)	9.81 (58) +0.50 (+3)	19.80 (117) +0.00 (+0)	7.11 (42) +0.17 (+1)	59.05 (349) +0.34 (+2)	4.23 (25) +0.00 (+0)	(591) (0)	20.31 (119) +0.51 (+2)	9.39 (55) +2.28 (+13)	62.80 (368) +3.75 (+19)	7.51 (44) +3.28 (+19)	(586) (−5)	23.86 (136) +3.55 (+17)	65.79 (375) +2.99 (+7)	10.35 (59) +2.84 (+15)	(570) (−16)	79.17 (399) +13.38 (+24)	20.83 (105) +10.48 (+46)	(504) (−66)
Surrey-Cloverdale; Marvin Hunt	6.19 (42)	32.60 (221)	5.46 (37)	1.92 (13)	49.26 (334)	4.57 (31)	(678)	7.42 (50) +1.23 (+8)	32.79 (221) +0.19 (+0)	5.49 (37) +0.03 (+0)	49.70 (335) +0.44 (+1)	4.60 (31) +0.03 (+0)	(674) (−4)	34.09 (224) +1.30 (+3)	6.70 (44) +1.21 (+7)	51.90 (341) +2.20 (+6)	7.31 (48) +2.71 (+17)	(657) (−17)	35.63 (228) +1.54 (+4)	55.16 (353) +3.26 (+12)	9.22 (59) +1.91 (+11)	(640) (−17)	61.08 (361) +5.92 (+8)	38.92 (230) +29.70 (+171)	(591) (−49)
Surrey-Fleetwood	9.82 (66)	40.92 (275)	9.08 (61)	0.00 (0)	33.93 (228)	6.25 (42)	(672)	9.82 (66) +0.00 (+0)	40.92 (275) +0.00 (+0)	9.08 (61) +0.00 (+0)	33.93 (228) +0.00 (+0)	6.25 (42) +0.00 (+0)	(672) (0)	44.64 (275) +3.72 (+0)	10.39 (64) +1.31 (+3)	37.82 (233) +3.89 (+5)	7.14 (44) +0.89 (+2)	(616) (−56)	49.91 (280) +5.27 (+5)	41.53 (233) +3.71 (+0)	8.56 (48) +1.42 (+4)	(561) (−55)	47.14 (239) +5.61 (+6)	52.86 (268) +44.30 (+220)	(507) (−54)
Surrey-Green Timbers	14.13 (128)	51.43 (466)	9.05 (82)	0.11 (1)	20.86 (189)	4.42 (40)	(906)	14.14 (128) +0.01 (+0)	51.49 (466) +0.06 (+0)	9.06 (82) +0.01 (+0)	20.88 (189) +0.02 (+0)	4.42 (40) +0.00 (+0)	(905) (−1)	58.97 (470) +7.48 (+4)	10.66 (85) +1.60 (+3)	23.96 (191) +3.08 (+2)	6.40 (51) +1.98 (+11)	(797) (−108)	64.54 (475) +5.57 (+5)	28.13 (207) +4.17 (+16)	7.34 (54) +0.94 (+3)	(736) (−61)	35.75 (232) +7.62 (+25)	64.25 (417) +56.91 (+363)	(649) (−87)
Surrey-Guildford	7.21 (16)	40.54 (90)	6.31 (14)	0.90 (2)	32.88 (73)	12.16 (27)	(222)	8.11 (18) +0.90 (+2)	40.54 (90) +0.00 (+0)	6.31 (14) +0.00 (+0)	32.88 (73) +0.00 (+0)	12.16 (27) +0.00 (+0)	(222) (0)	42.53 (94) +1.99 (+4)	7.24 (16) +0.93 (+2)	33.48 (74) +0.60 (+1)	16.74 (37) +4.58 (+10)	(221) (−1)	44.81 (95) +2.28 (+1)	35.85 (76) +2.37 (+2)	19.34 (41) +2.60 (+4)	(212) (−9)	55.90 (90) +20.05 (+14)	44.10 (71) +24.76 (+30)	(161) (−51)
Surrey-Newton	8.65 (86)	47.28 (470)	8.55 (85)	0.70 (7)	23.94 (238)	10.87 (108)	(994)	8.65 (86) +0.00 (+0)	47.38 (471) +0.10 (+1)	8.55 (85) +0.00 (+0)	24.45 (243) +0.51 (+5)	10.97 (109) +0.10 (+1)	(994) (0)	51.33 (481) +3.95 (+10)	9.61 (90) +1.06 (+5)	26.36 (247) +1.91 (+4)	12.70 (119) +1.73 (+10)	(937) (−57)	55.27 (493) +3.94 (+12)	30.49 (272) +4.13 (+25)	14.24 (127) +1.54 (+8)	(892) (−45)	39.66 (303) +9.17 (+31)	60.34 (461) +46.10 (+334)	(764) (−128)
Surrey-Panorama	10.55 (133)	42.27 (533)	13.72 (173)	0.79 (10)	29.34 (370)	3.33 (42)	(1261)	10.96 (138) +0.41 (+5)	42.49 (535) +0.22 (+2)	13.74 (173) +0.02 (+0)	29.39 (370) +0.05 (+0)	3.42 (43) +0.09 (+1)	(1259) (−2)	46.24 (541) +3.75 (+6)	15.30 (179) +1.56 (+6)	32.48 (380) +3.09 (+10)	5.98 (70) +2.56 (+27)	(1170) (−89)	53.58 (568) +7.34 (+27)	38.58 (409) +6.10 (+29)	7.83 (83) +1.85 (+13)	(1060) (−110)	43.65 (426) +5.07 (+17)	56.35 (550) +48.52 (+467)	(976) (−84)
Surrey-Whalley	27.29 (152)	36.45 (203)	6.10 (34)	0.54 (3)	26.75 (149)	2.87 (16)	(557)	27.34 (152) +0.05 (+0)	36.51 (203) +0.06 (+0)	6.29 (35) +0.19 (+1)	26.98 (150) +0.23 (+1)	2.88 (16) +0.01 (+0)	(556) (−1)	40.47 (208) +3.96 (+5)	9.34 (48) +3.05 (+13)	30.54 (157) +3.56 (+7)	19.65 (101) +16.77 (+85)	(514) (−42)	42.60 (213) +2.13 (+5)	34.40 (172) +3.86 (+15)	23.00 (115) +3.35 (+14)	(500) (−14)	42.23 (182) +7.83 (+10)	57.77 (249) +34.77 (+134)	(431) (−69)
Surrey-White Rock; Tracy Redies (Wilkinson)	7.85 (38)	16.32 (79)	10.74 (52)	2.69 (13)	53.10 (257)	9.30 (45)	(484)	8.26 (40) +0.41 (+2)	17.36 (84) +1.04 (+5)	10.74 (52) +0.00 (+0)	53.72 (260) +0.62 (+3)	9.92 (48) +0.62 (+3)	(484) (0)	18.18 (86) +0.82 (+2)	11.84 (56) +1.10 (+4)	56.66 (268) +2.94 (+8)	13.32 (63) +3.40 (+15)	(473) (−11)	23.39 (109) +5.21 (+23)	60.94 (284) +4.28 (+16)	15.67 (73) +2.35 (+10)	(466) (−7)	75.06 (310) +14.12 (+26)	24.94 (103) +9.27 (+30)	(413) (−53)
Fraser Valley	Ballot 1							Ballot 2						Ballot 3					Ballot 4				Ballot 5		
Riding MLA (supported)	de Jong	Lee	Stone	Sull-ivan	Watts	Wilk-inson	Total	de Jong	Lee	Stone	Watts	Wilk-inson	Total	Lee	Stone	Watts	Wilk-inson	Total	Lee	Watts	Wilk-inson	Total	Watts	Wilk-inson	Total
Abbotsford South	49.84 (309)	23.87 (148)	7.10 (44)	0.81 (5)	16.61 (103)	1.77 (11)	(620)	50.08 (309) +0.24 (+0)	24.15 (149) +0.28 (+1)	7.13 (44) +0.03 (+0)	16.86 (104) +0.25 (+1)	1.78 (11) +0.01 (+0)	(617) (−3)	33.07 (166) +8.92 (+17)	11.95 (60) +4.82 (+16)	25.70 (129) +8.84 (+25)	29.28 (147) +27.50 (+136)	(502) (−115)	37.39 (178) +4.32 (+12)	29.62 (141) +3.92 (+12)	32.98 (157) +3.70 (+10)	(476) (−26)	37.26 (158) +7.64 (+17)	62.74 (266) +29.76 (+109)	(424) (−52)
Abbotsford West; Mike de Jong (de Jong)	41.58 (427)	36.22 (372)	6.23 (64)	0.10 (1)	13.34 (137)	2.53 (26)	(1027)	41.62 (427) +0.04 (+0)	36.26 (372) +0.04 (+0)	6.24 (64) +0.01 (+0)	13.35 (137) +0.01 (+0)	2.53 (26) +0.00 (+0)	(1026) (−1)	45.87 (394) +9.61 (+22)	9.66 (83) +3.42 (+19)	20.61 (177) +7.26 (+40)	23.86 (205) +21.33 (+179)	(859) (−167)	50.50 (408) +4.63 (+14)	23.02 (186) +2.41 (+9)	26.49 (214) +2.63 (+9)	(808) (−51)	31.45 (212) +8.43 (+26)	68.55 (462) +42.06 (+248)	(674) (−134)
Abbotsford-Mission; Simon Gibson (de Jong)	42.35 (155)	19.67 (72)	6.83 (25)	0.82 (3)	23.77 (87)	6.56 (24)	(366)	42.74 (156) +0.39 (+1)	20.00 (73) +0.33 (+1)	6.85 (25) +0.02 (+0)	23.84 (87) +0.07 (+0)	6.58 (24) +0.02 (+0)	(365) (−1)	24.62 (81) +4.62 (+8)	14.89 (49) +8.04 (+24)	33.74 (111) +9.90 (+24)	26.75 (88) +20.17 (+64)	(329) (−36)	28.30 (88) +3.68 (+7)	40.51 (126) +6.77 (+15)	31.19 (97) +4.44 (+9)	(311) (−18)	47.78 (140) +7.27 (+14)	52.22 (153) +21.03 (+56)	(293) (−18)
Chilliwack; John Martin (de Jong)	20.13 (30)	19.46 (29)	11.41 (17)	4.03 (6)	22.82 (34)	22.15 (33)	(149)	20.13 (30) +0.00 (+0)	20.13 (30) +0.67 (+1)	11.41 (17) +0.00 (+0)	25.50 (38) +2.68 (+4)	22.82 (34) +0.67 (+1)	(149) (0)	21.92 (32) +1.79 (+2)	13.70 (20) +2.29 (+3)	29.45 (43) +3.95 (+5)	34.93 (51) +12.11 (+17)	(146) (−3)	24.82 (35) +2.90 (+3)	36.88 (52) +7.43 (+9)	38.30 (54) +3.37 (+3)	(141) (−5)	41.98 (55) +5.10 (+3)	58.02 (76) +19.72 (+22)	(131) (−10)
Chilliwack-Kent; Laurie Throness (Wilkinson)	21.25 (61)	13.24 (38)	9.76 (28)	1.05 (3)	22.30 (64)	32.40 (93)	(287)	21.25 (61) +0.00 (+0)	13.24 (38) +0.00 (+0)	9.76 (28) +0.00 (+0)	22.30 (64) +0.00 (+0)	33.45 (96) +1.05 (+3)	(287) (0)	16.61 (45) +3.37 (+7)	11.81 (32) +2.05 (+4)	28.04 (76) +5.74 (+12)	43.54 (118) +10.09 (+22)	(271) (−16)	18.46 (48) +1.85 (+3)	33.08 (86) +5.04 (+10)	48.46 (126) +4.92 (+8)	(260) (−11)	40.73 (101) +7.65 (+15)	59.27 (147) +10.81 (+21)	(248) (−12)
Langley; Mary Polak (Wilkinson)	6.32 (16)	20.95 (53)	15.42 (39)	2.37 (6)	39.53 (100)	15.42 (39)	(253)	6.32 (16) +0.00 (+0)	21.34 (54) +0.39 (+1)	16.21 (41) +0.79 (+2)	39.92 (101) +0.39 (+1)	16.21 (41) +0.79 (+2)	(253) (0)	21.60 (54) +0.26 (+0)	18.80 (47) +2.59 (+6)	42.40 (106) +2.48 (+5)	17.20 (43) +0.99 (+2)	(250) (−3)	25.62 (62) +4.02 (+8)	53.31 (129) +10.91 (+23)	21.07 (51) +3.87 (+8)	(242) (−8)	60.26 (138) +6.95 (+9)	39.74 (91) +18.67 (+40)	(229) (−13)
Langley East; Rich Coleman (de Jong)	19.88 (67)	16.02 (54)	10.09 (34)	1.19 (4)	42.73 (144)	10.09 (34)	(337)	19.88 (67) +0.00 (+0)	16.91 (57) +0.89 (+3)	10.39 (35) +0.30 (+1)	42.73 (144) +0.00 (+0)	10.09 (34) +0.00 (+0)	(337) (0)	20.50 (65) +3.59 (+8)	13.25 (42) +2.86 (+7)	49.84 (158) +7.11 (+14)	16.40 (52) +6.31 (+18)	(317) (−20)	24.00 (72) +3.50 (+7)	56.00 (168) +6.16 (+10)	20.00 (60) +3.60 (+8)	(300) (−17)	64.71 (187) +8.71 (+19)	35.29 (102) +15.29 (+42)	(289) (−11)
Maple Ridge-Mission	12.28 (35)	37.54 (107)	8.07 (23)	1.40 (4)	31.58 (90)	9.12 (26)	(285)	12.32 (35) +0.04 (+0)	37.68 (107) +0.14 (+0)	8.10 (23) +0.03 (+0)	31.69 (90) +0.11 (+0)	10.21 (29) +1.09 (+3)	(284) (−1)	39.36 (111) +1.68 (+4)	9.57 (27) +1.47 (+4)	33.33 (94) +1.64 (+4)	17.73 (50) +7.52 (+21)	(282) (−2)	42.45 (118) +3.09 (+7)	38.49 (107) +5.16 (+13)	19.06 (53) +1.33 (+3)	(278) (−4)	47.84 (122) +9.35 (+15)	52.16 (133) +33.10 (+80)	(255) (−23)
Maple Ridge-Pitt Meadows	5.16 (11)	13.15 (28)	10.80 (23)	2.35 (5)	37.56 (80)	30.99 (66)	(213)	5.63 (12) +0.47 (+1)	14.08 (30) +0.93 (+2)	10.80 (23) +0.00 (+0)	37.56 (80) +0.00 (+0)	31.92 (68) +0.93 (+2)	(213) (0)	14.55 (31) +0.47 (+1)	12.21 (26) +1.41 (+3)	38.97 (83) +1.41 (+3)	34.27 (73) +2.35 (+5)	(213) (0)	17.56 (36) +3.01 (+5)	42.44 (87) +3.47 (+4)	40.00 (82) +5.73 (+9)	(205) (−8)	51.58 (98) +9.14 (+11)	48.42 (92) +8.42 (+10)	(190) (−15)

Vancouver Island
Greater Victoria	Ballot 1							Ballot 2						Ballot 3					Ballot 4				Ballot 5		
Riding MLA (supported)	de Jong	Lee	Stone	Sull-ivan	Watts	Wilk-inson	Total	de Jong	Lee	Stone	Watts	Wilk-inson	Total	Lee	Stone	Watts	Wilk-inson	Total	Lee	Watts	Wilk-inson	Total	Watts	Wilk-inson	Total
Esquimalt-Metchosin	20.00 (24)	6.67 (8)	25.83 (31)	2.50 (3)	25.00 (30)	20.00 (24)	(120)	20.83 (25) +0.83 (+1)	6.67 (8) +0.00 (+0)	25.83 (31) +0.00 (+0)	25.00 (30) +0.00 (+0)	21.67 (26) +1.67 (+2)	(120) (0)	7.21 (8) +0.54 (+0)	36.04 (40) +10.21 (+9)	27.03 (30) +2.03 (+0)	29.73 (33) +8.06 (+7)	(111) (−9)	19.61 (20) +12.40 (+12)	35.29 (36) +8.26 (+6)	45.10 (46) +15.37 (+13)	(102) (−9)	41.49 (39) +6.20 (+3)	58.51 (55) +13.41 (+9)	(94) (−8)
Langford-Juan de Fuca	15.18 (17)	20.54 (23)	26.79 (30)	0.89 (1)	25.89 (29)	10.71 (12)	(112)	15.18 (17) +0.00 (+0)	20.54 (23) +0.00 (+0)	26.79 (30) +0.00 (+0)	25.89 (29) +0.00 (+0)	11.61 (13) +0.90 (+1)	(112) (0)	20.91 (23) +0.37 (+0)	32.73 (36) +5.94 (+6)	28.18 (31) +2.29 (+2)	18.18 (20) +6.57 (+7)	(110) (−2)	30.10 (31) +9.19 (+8)	37.86 (39) +9.68 (+8)	32.04 (33) +13.86 (+13)	(103) (−7)	48.98 (48) +11.12 (+9)	51.02 (50) +18.98 (+17)	(98) (−5)
Oak Bay-Gordon Head	16.17 (43)	21.05 (56)	24.06 (64)	3.38 (9)	19.17 (51)	16.17 (43)	(266)	16.17 (43) +0.00 (+0)	21.80 (58) +0.75 (+2)	25.19 (67) +1.13 (+3)	19.92 (53) +0.75 (+2)	16.92 (45) +0.75 (+2)	(266) (0)	22.83 (58) +1.03 (+0)	29.53 (75) +4.34 (+8)	23.62 (60) +3.70 (+7)	24.02 (61) +7.10 (+16)	(254) (−12)	31.40 (76) +8.57 (+18)	31.82 (77) +8.20 (+17)	36.78 (89) +12.76 (+28)	(242) (−12)	46.15 (102) +14.33 (+25)	53.85 (119) +17.07 (+30)	(221) (−21)
Saanich North and the Islands	6.44 (17)	11.74 (31)	28.41 (75)	3.41 (9)	36.36 (96)	13.64 (36)	(264)	7.25 (19) +0.81 (+2)	12.21 (32) +0.47 (+1)	28.63 (75) +0.22 (+0)	37.02 (97) +0.66 (+1)	14.89 (39) +1.25 (+3)	(262) (−2)	13.41 (35) +1.20 (+3)	29.12 (76) +0.49 (+1)	38.70 (101) +1.68 (+4)	18.77 (49) +3.88 (+10)	(261) (−1)	21.76 (52) +8.35 (+17)	47.28 (113) +8.58 (+12)	30.96 (74) +12.19 (+25)	(239) (−22)	60.35 (137) +13.07 (+24)	39.65 (90) +8.69 (+16)	(227) (−12)
Saanich South	12.32 (35)	12.32 (35)	15.14 (43)	3.17 (9)	26.76 (76)	30.28 (86)	(284)	13.07 (37) +0.75 (+2)	13.07 (37) +0.75 (+2)	15.19 (43) +0.05 (+0)	27.56 (78) +0.80 (+2)	31.10 (88) +0.82 (+2)	(283) (−1)	14.75 (41) +1.68 (+4)	16.91 (47) +1.72 (+4)	30.22 (84) +2.66 (+6)	38.13 (106) +7.03 (+18)	(278) (−5)	21.25 (58) +6.50 (+17)	32.97 (90) +2.75 (+6)	45.79 (125) +7.66 (+19)	(273) (−5)	42.35 (108) +9.38 (+18)	57.65 (147) +11.86 (+22)	(255) (−18)
Victoria-Beacon Hill	15.59 (29)	10.75 (20)	23.66 (44)	1.61 (3)	22.58 (42)	25.81 (48)	(186)	15.59 (29) +0.00 (+0)	11.83 (22) +1.08 (+2)	23.66 (44) +0.00 (+0)	22.58 (42) +0.00 (+0)	26.34 (49) +0.53 (+1)	(186) (0)	13.89 (25) +2.06 (+3)	27.78 (50) +4.12 (+6)	25.56 (46) +2.98 (+4)	32.78 (59) +6.44 (+10)	(180) (−6)	20.71 (35) +6.82 (+10)	33.14 (56) +7.58 (+10)	46.15 (78) +13.37 (+19)	(169) (−11)	37.65 (61) +4.51 (+5)	62.35 (101) +16.20 (+23)	(162) (−7)
Victoria-Swan Lake	21.85 (26)	16.81 (20)	20.17 (24)	0.84 (1)	24.37 (29)	15.97 (19)	(119)	22.69 (27) +0.84 (+1)	16.81 (20) +0.00 (+0)	20.17 (24) +0.00 (+0)	24.37 (29) +0.00 (+0)	15.97 (19) +0.00 (+0)	(119) (0)	20.18 (23) +3.37 (+3)	23.68 (27) +3.51 (+3)	27.19 (31) +2.82 (+2)	28.95 (33) +12.98 (+14)	(114) (−5)	27.88 (29) +7.70 (+6)	29.81 (31) +2.62 (+0)	42.31 (44) +13.36 (+11)	(104) (−10)	38.04 (35) +8.23 (+4)	61.96 (57) +19.65 (+13)	(92) (−12)
North Island	Ballot 1							Ballot 2						Ballot 3					Ballot 4				Ballot 5		
Riding MLA (supported)	de Jong	Lee	Stone	Sull-ivan	Watts	Wilk-inson	Total	de Jong	Lee	Stone	Watts	Wilk-inson	Total	Lee	Stone	Watts	Wilk-inson	Total	Lee	Watts	Wilk-inson	Total	Watts	Wilk-inson	Total
Courtenay-Comox	17.95 (86)	30.90 (148)	10.23 (49)	1.25 (6)	26.93 (129)	12.73 (61)	(479)	18.16 (87) +0.21 (+1)	31.32 (150) +0.42 (+2)	10.23 (49) +0.00 (+0)	27.14 (130) +0.21 (+1)	13.15 (63) +0.42 (+2)	(479) (0)	35.73 (169) +4.41 (+19)	13.53 (64) +3.30 (+15)	31.08 (147) +3.94 (+17)	19.66 (93) +6.51 (+30)	(473) (−6)	40.52 (188) +4.79 (+19)	35.99 (167) +4.91 (+20)	23.49 (109) +3.83 (+16)	(464) (−9)	56.67 (238) +20.68 (+71)	43.33 (182) +19.84 (+73)	(420) (−44)
Cowichan Valley	14.69 (26)	9.04 (16)	25.42 (45)	0.00 (0)	27.68 (49)	23.16 (41)	(177)	14.69 (26) +0.00 (+0)	9.04 (16) +0.00 (+0)	25.42 (45) +0.00 (+0)	27.68 (49) +0.00 (+0)	23.16 (41) +0.00 (+0)	(177) (0)	11.36 (20) +2.32 (+4)	26.70 (47) +1.28 (+2)	31.25 (55) +3.57 (+6)	30.68 (54) +7.52 (+13)	(176) (−1)	18.13 (31) +6.77 (+11)	38.60 (66) +7.35 (+11)	43.27 (74) +12.59 (+20)	(171) (−5)	46.06 (76) +7.46 (+10)	53.94 (89) +10.67 (+15)	(165) (−6)
Mid Island-Pacific Rim	20.98 (30)	14.69 (21)	13.29 (19)	1.40 (2)	35.66 (51)	13.99 (20)	(143)	20.98 (30) +0.00 (+0)	14.69 (21) +0.00 (+0)	13.29 (19) +0.00 (+0)	37.06 (53) +1.40 (+2)	13.99 (20) +0.00 (+0)	(143) (0)	16.18 (22) +1.49 (+1)	16.91 (23) +3.62 (+4)	42.65 (58) +5.59 (+5)	24.26 (33) +10.27 (+13)	(136) (−7)	19.38 (25) +3.20 (+3)	49.61 (64) +6.96 (+6)	31.01 (40) +6.75 (+7)	(129) (−7)	59.20 (74) +9.59 (+10)	40.80 (51) +9.79 (+11)	(125) (−4)
Nanaimo	17.39 (40)	10.00 (23)	20.43 (47)	1.30 (3)	27.39 (63)	23.48 (54)	(230)	17.39 (40) +0.00 (+0)	10.43 (24) +0.43 (+1)	20.87 (48) +0.44 (+1)	27.39 (63) +0.00 (+0)	23.91 (55) +0.43 (+1)	(230) (0)	14.49 (31) +4.06 (+7)	23.83 (51) +2.96 (+3)	31.78 (68) +4.39 (+5)	29.91 (64) +6.00 (+9)	(214) (−16)	20.79 (42) +6.30 (+11)	40.10 (81) +8.32 (+13)	39.11 (79) +9.20 (+15)	(202) (−12)	49.74 (94) +9.64 (+13)	50.26 (95) +11.15 (+16)	(189) (−13)
Nanaimo-North Cowichan	21.19 (32)	11.92 (18)	19.21 (29)	2.65 (4)	30.46 (46)	14.57 (22)	(151)	21.19 (32) +0.00 (+0)	13.91 (21) +1.99 (+3)	19.21 (29) +0.00 (+0)	31.13 (47) +0.67 (+1)	14.57 (22) +0.00 (+0)	(151) (0)	17.81 (26) +3.90 (+5)	25.34 (37) +6.13 (+8)	34.25 (50) +3.12 (+3)	22.60 (33) +8.03 (+11)	(146) (−5)	24.65 (35) +6.84 (+9)	44.37 (63) +10.12 (+13)	30.99 (44) +8.39 (+11)	(142) (−4)	53.38 (71) +9.01 (+8)	46.62 (62) +15.63 (+18)	(133) (−9)
North Island	19.86 (29)	6.85 (10)	15.07 (22)	2.05 (3)	31.51 (46)	24.66 (36)	(146)	20.55 (30) +0.69 (+1)	6.85 (10) +0.00 (+0)	16.44 (24) +1.37 (+2)	31.51 (46) +0.00 (+0)	24.66 (36) +0.00 (+0)	(146) (0)	9.86 (14) +3.01 (+4)	21.83 (31) +5.39 (+7)	33.80 (48) +2.29 (+2)	34.51 (49) +9.85 (+13)	(142) (−4)	18.38 (25) +8.52 (+11)	38.97 (53) +5.17 (+5)	42.65 (58) +8.14 (+9)	(136) (−6)	45.93 (62) +6.96 (+9)	54.07 (73) +11.42 (+15)	(135) (−1)
Parksville-Qualicum; Michelle Stilwell (Wilkinson)	12.64 (35)	10.11 (28)	11.19 (31)	1.44 (4)	28.88 (80)	35.74 (99)	(277)	12.64 (35) +0.00 (+0)	10.47 (29) +0.36 (+1)	11.19 (31) +0.00 (+0)	29.60 (82) +0.72 (+2)	36.10 (100) +0.36 (+1)	(277) (0)	11.85 (32) +1.38 (+3)	13.33 (36) +2.14 (+5)	31.85 (86) +2.25 (+4)	42.96 (116) +6.86 (+16)	(270) (−7)	14.02 (37) +2.17 (+5)	34.85 (92) +3.00 (+6)	51.14 (135) +8.18 (+19)	(264) (−6)	41.47 (107) +6.62 (+15)	58.53 (151) +7.39 (+16)	(258) (−6)
Powell River-Sunshine Coast	8.30 (19)	13.97 (32)	28.38 (65)	2.18 (5)	27.07 (62)	20.09 (46)	(229)	8.73 (20) +0.43 (+1)	14.41 (33) +0.44 (+1)	28.38 (65) +0.00 (+0)	27.07 (62) +0.00 (+0)	21.40 (49) +1.31 (+3)	(229) (0)	17.18 (39) +2.77 (+6)	29.52 (67) +1.14 (+2)	28.63 (65) +1.56 (+3)	24.67 (56) +3.27 (+7)	(227) (−2)	27.57 (59) +10.39 (+20)	38.79 (83) +10.16 (+18)	33.64 (72) +8.97 (+16)	(214) (−13)	51.00 (102) +12.21 (+19)	49.00 (98) +15.36 (+26)	(200) (−14)

Interior
Okanagan	Ballot 1							Ballot 2						Ballot 3					Ballot 4				Ballot 5		
Riding MLA (supported)	de Jong	Lee	Stone	Sull-ivan	Watts	Wilk-inson	Total	de Jong	Lee	Stone	Watts	Wilk-inson	Total	Lee	Stone	Watts	Wilk-inson	Total	Lee	Watts	Wilk-inson	Total	Watts	Wilk-inson	Total
Boundary-Similkameen; Linda Larson (Wilkinson)	16.91 (46)	25.00 (68)	12.50 (34)	1.47 (4)	33.82 (92)	10.29 (28)	(272)	16.97 (46) +0.06 (+0)	25.09 (68) +0.09 (+0)	13.28 (36) +0.78 (+2)	34.32 (93) +0.50 (+1)	10.33 (28) +0.04 (+0)	(271) (−1)	26.32 (70) +1.23 (+2)	16.92 (45) +3.64 (+9)	36.84 (98) +2.52 (+5)	19.92 (53) +9.59 (+25)	(266) (−5)	30.12 (75) +3.80 (+5)	43.37 (108) +6.53 (+10)	26.51 (66) +6.59 (+13)	(249) (−17)	55.75 (126) +12.38 (+18)	44.25 (100) +17.74 (+34)	(226) (−23)
Kelowna West	18.80 (50)	12.78 (34)	19.17 (51)	1.13 (3)	23.68 (63)	24.44 (65)	(266)	19.25 (51) +0.45 (+1)	12.83 (34) +0.05 (+0)	19.62 (52) +0.45 (+1)	23.77 (63) +0.09 (+0)	24.53 (65) +0.09 (+0)	(265) (−1)	17.12 (44) +4.29 (+10)	23.74 (61) +4.12 (+9)	26.46 (68) +2.69 (+5)	32.68 (84) +8.15 (+19)	(257) (−8)	25.41 (62) +8.29 (+18)	33.20 (81) +6.74 (+13)	41.39 (101) +8.71 (+17)	(244) (−13)	39.39 (91) +6.19 (+10)	60.61 (140) +19.22 (+39)	(231) (−13)
Kelowna-Lake Country; Norm Letnick (Wilkinson)	8.05 (38)	27.12 (128)	10.81 (51)	1.06 (5)	19.07 (90)	33.90 (160)	(472)	8.05 (38) +0.00 (+0)	27.54 (130) +0.42 (+2)	11.23 (53) +0.42 (+2)	19.07 (90) +0.00 (+0)	34.11 (161) +0.21 (+1)	(472) (0)	29.48 (135) +1.94 (+5)	12.66 (58) +1.43 (+5)	20.09 (92) +1.02 (+2)	37.77 (173) +3.66 (+12)	(458) (−14)	34.00 (153) +4.52 (+18)	23.33 (105) +3.24 (+13)	42.67 (192) +4.90 (+19)	(450) (−8)	31.39 (124) +8.06 (+19)	68.61 (271) +25.94 (+79)	(395) (−55)
Kelowna-Mission; Steve Thomson (Stone)	13.43 (45)	12.84 (43)	20.60 (69)	0.30 (1)	23.58 (79)	29.25 (98)	(335)	13.43 (45) +0.00 (+0)	12.84 (43) +0.00 (+0)	20.90 (70) +0.30 (+1)	23.58 (79) +0.00 (+0)	29.25 (98) +0.00 (+0)	(335) (0)	13.98 (46) +1.14 (+3)	24.62 (81) +3.72 (+11)	24.92 (82) +1.34 (+3)	36.47 (120) +7.22 (+22)	(329) (−6)	22.22 (68) +8.24 (+22)	28.76 (88) +3.84 (+6)	49.02 (150) +12.55 (+30)	(306) (−23)	35.35 (105) +6.59 (+17)	64.65 (192) +15.63 (+42)	(297) (−9)
Penticton; Dan Ashton	13.51 (52)	34.55 (133)	11.69 (45)	2.60 (10)	20.52 (79)	17.14 (66)	(385)	13.61 (52) +0.10 (+0)	35.86 (137) +1.31 (+4)	12.04 (46) +0.35 (+1)	20.94 (80) +0.42 (+1)	17.54 (67) +0.40 (+1)	(382) (−3)	38.93 (146) +3.07 (+9)	15.20 (57) +3.16 (+11)	23.20 (87) +2.26 (+7)	22.67 (85) +5.13 (+18)	(375) (−7)	41.64 (152) +2.71 (+6)	30.14 (110) +6.94 (+23)	28.22 (103) +5.55 (+18)	(365) (−10)	42.43 (129) +12.29 (+19)	57.57 (175) +29.35 (+72)	(304) (−61)
Shuswap; Greg Kyllo (Stone)	6.96 (25)	7.80 (28)	64.62 (232)	0.28 (1)	10.31 (37)	10.03 (36)	(359)	6.96 (25) +0.00 (+0)	7.80 (28) +0.00 (+0)	64.62 (232) +0.00 (+0)	10.58 (38) +0.27 (+1)	10.03 (36) +0.00 (+0)	(359) (0)	8.19 (29) +0.39 (+1)	66.95 (237) +2.33 (+5)	11.86 (42) +1.28 (+4)	12.99 (46) +2.96 (+10)	(354) (−5)	34.39 (98) +26.20 (+69)	34.04 (97) +22.18 (+55)	31.58 (90) +18.59 (+44)	(285) (−69)	51.23 (125) +17.19 (+28)	48.77 (119) +17.19 (+29)	(244) (−41)
Vernon-Monashee; Eric Foster	11.90 (40)	6.25 (21)	17.56 (59)	0.60 (2)	12.80 (43)	50.89 (171)	(336)	11.94 (40) +0.04 (+0)	6.27 (21) +0.02 (+0)	17.61 (59) +0.05 (+0)	12.84 (43) +0.04 (+0)	51.34 (172) +0.45 (+1)	(335) (−1)	8.16 (27) +1.89 (+6)	20.24 (67) +2.63 (+8)	14.50 (48) +1.66 (+5)	57.10 (189) +5.76 (+17)	(331) (−4)	13.03 (40) +4.87 (+13)	19.87 (61) +5.37 (+13)	67.10 (206) +10.00 (+17)	(307) (−24)	22.90 (68) +3.03 (+7)	77.10 (229) +10.00 (+23)	(297) (−10)
Columbia, Kootenay	Ballot 1							Ballot 2						Ballot 3					Ballot 4				Ballot 5		
Riding MLA (supported)	de Jong	Lee	Stone	Sull-ivan	Watts	Wilk-inson	Total	de Jong	Lee	Stone	Watts	Wilk-inson	Total	Lee	Stone	Watts	Wilk-inson	Total	Lee	Watts	Wilk-inson	Total	Watts	Wilk-inson	Total
Columbia River-Revelstoke; Doug Clovechok (Wilkinson)	3.76 (7)	9.14 (17)	24.73 (46)	0.54 (1)	9.68 (18)	52.15 (97)	(186)	3.78 (7) +0.02 (+0)	9.19 (17) +0.05 (+0)	24.86 (46) +0.13 (+0)	9.73 (18) +0.05 (+0)	52.43 (97) +0.28 (+0)	(185) (−1)	9.44 (17) +0.25 (+0)	25.56 (46) +0.70 (+0)	10.56 (19) +0.83 (+1)	54.44 (98) +2.01 (+1)	(180) (−5)	17.07 (28) +7.63 (+11)	14.02 (23) +3.46 (+4)	68.90 (113) +14.46 (+15)	(164) (−16)	21.12 (34) +7.10 (+11)	78.88 (127) +9.98 (+14)	(161) (−3)
Kootenay East; Tom Shypitka (Wilkinson)	3.43 (13)	6.60 (25)	6.86 (26)	0.53 (2)	14.51 (55)	68.07 (258)	(379)	3.43 (13) +0.00 (+0)	6.60 (25) +0.00 (+0)	6.86 (26) +0.00 (+0)	14.51 (55) +0.00 (+0)	68.60 (260) +0.53 (+2)	(379) (0)	6.95 (26) +0.35 (+1)	7.22 (27) +0.36 (+1)	15.24 (57) +0.73 (+2)	70.59 (264) +1.99 (+4)	(374) (−5)	7.92 (29) +0.97 (+3)	16.39 (60) +1.15 (+3)	75.68 (277) +5.09 (+13)	(366) (−8)	18.64 (66) +2.25 (+6)	81.36 (288) +5.68 (+11)	(354) (−12)
Kootenay West	5.93 (7)	25.42 (30)	27.97 (33)	0.85 (1)	7.63 (9)	32.20 (38)	(118)	5.93 (7) +0.00 (+0)	25.42 (30) +0.00 (+0)	27.97 (33) +0.00 (+0)	8.47 (10) +0.84 (+1)	32.20 (38) +0.00 (+0)	(118) (0)	26.50 (31) +1.08 (+1)	29.06 (34) +1.09 (+1)	9.40 (11) +0.93 (+1)	35.04 (41) +2.84 (+3)	(117) (−1)	35.35 (35) +8.85 (+4)	18.18 (18) +8.78 (+7)	46.46 (46) +11.42 (+5)	(99) (−18)	27.08 (26) +8.90 (+8)	72.92 (70) +26.46 (+24)	(96) (−3)
Nelson-Creston	17.92 (19)	6.60 (7)	14.15 (15)	0.00 (0)	24.53 (26)	36.79 (39)	(106)	17.92 (19) +0.00 (+0)	6.60 (7) +0.00 (+0)	14.15 (15) +0.00 (+0)	24.53 (26) +0.00 (+0)	36.79 (39) +0.00 (+0)	(106) (0)	7.84 (8) +1.24 (+1)	16.67 (17) +2.52 (+2)	29.41 (30) +4.88 (+4)	46.08 (47) +9.29 (+8)	(102) (−4)	11.00 (11) +3.16 (+3)	31.00 (31) +1.59 (+1)	58.00 (58) +11.92 (+11)	(100) (−2)	37.37 (37) +6.37 (+6)	62.63 (62) +4.63 (+4)	(99) (−1)
Cariboo, Thompson	Ballot 1							Ballot 2						Ballot 3					Ballot 4				Ballot 5		
Riding MLA (supported)	de Jong	Lee	Stone	Sull-ivan	Watts	Wilk-inson	Total	de Jong	Lee	Stone	Watts	Wilk-inson	Total	Lee	Stone	Watts	Wilk-inson	Total	Lee	Watts	Wilk-inson	Total	Watts	Wilk-inson	Total
Cariboo North; Coralee Oakes (Stone)	14.66 (28)	15.71 (30)	28.80 (55)	1.05 (2)	18.85 (36)	20.94 (40)	(191)	14.66 (28) +0.00 (+0)	15.71 (30) +0.00 (+0)	28.80 (55) +0.00 (+0)	19.90 (38) +1.05 (+2)	20.94 (40) +0.00 (+0)	(191) (0)	17.20 (32) +1.49 (+2)	34.41 (64) +5.61 (+9)	23.66 (44) +3.76 (+6)	24.73 (46) +3.79 (+6)	(186) (−5)	23.35 (39) +6.15 (+7)	34.13 (57) +10.47 (+13)	42.51 (71) +17.78 (+25)	(167) (−19)	38.13 (61) +4.00 (+4)	61.88 (99) +19.37 (+28)	(160) (−7)
Cariboo-Chilcotin; Donna Barnett (Wilkinson)	4.07 (10)	5.69 (14)	11.38 (28)	0.00 (0)	19.92 (49)	58.94 (145)	(246)	4.07 (10) +0.00 (+0)	5.69 (14) +0.00 (+0)	11.38 (28) +0.00 (+0)	19.92 (49) +0.00 (+0)	58.94 (145) +0.00 (+0)	(246) (0)	6.12 (15) +0.43 (+1)	11.43 (28) +0.05 (+0)	22.86 (56) +2.94 (+7)	59.59 (146) +0.65 (+1)	(245) (−1)	7.02 (17) +0.90 (+2)	27.69 (67) +4.83 (+11)	65.29 (158) +5.70 (+12)	(242) (−3)	28.69 (68) +1.00 (+1)	71.31 (169) +6.02 (+11)	(237) (−5)
Fraser-Nicola; Jackie Tegart	12.26 (26)	3.77 (8)	57.08 (121)	0.00 (0)	10.85 (23)	16.04 (34)	(212)	12.26 (26) +0.00 (+0)	3.77 (8) +0.00 (+0)	57.08 (121) +0.00 (+0)	10.85 (23) +0.00 (+0)	16.04 (34) +0.00 (+0)	(212) (0)	4.39 (9) +0.62 (+1)	63.41 (130) +6.33 (+9)	12.20 (25) +1.35 (+2)	20.00 (41) +3.96 (+7)	(205) (−7)	19.62 (31) +15.23 (+22)	31.01 (49) +18.81 (+24)	49.37 (78) +29.37 (+37)	(158) (−47)	38.93 (58) +7.92 (+9)	61.07 (91) +11.70 (+13)	(149) (−9)
Kamloops-North Thompson; Peter Milobar (Stone)	3.03 (15)	3.43 (17)	82.42 (408)	0.40 (2)	6.06 (30)	4.65 (23)	(495)	3.03 (15) +0.00 (+0)	3.43 (17) +0.00 (+0)	82.83 (410) +0.41 (+2)	6.06 (30) +0.00 (+0)	4.65 (23) +0.00 (+0)	(495) (0)	4.05 (20) +0.62 (+3)	84.82 (419) +1.99 (+9)	6.28 (31) +0.22 (+1)	4.86 (24) +0.21 (+1)	(494) (−1)	36.36 (112) +32.31 (+92)	37.34 (115) +31.06 (+84)	26.30 (81) +21.44 (+57)	(308) (−186)	59.12 (162) +21.78 (+47)	40.88 (112) +14.58 (+31)	(274) (−34)
Kamloops-South Thompson; Todd Stone (Stone)	2.66 (21)	0.89 (7)	90.23 (711)	0.63 (5)	2.66 (21)	2.92 (23)	(788)	2.92 (23) +0.26 (+2)	1.02 (8) +0.13 (+1)	90.48 (713) +0.25 (+2)	2.66 (21) +0.00 (+0)	2.92 (23) +0.00 (+0)	(788) (0)	1.02 (8) +0.00 (+0)	92.24 (725) +1.76 (+12)	2.80 (22) +0.14 (+1)	3.94 (31) +1.02 (+8)	(786) (−2)	35.10 (159) +34.08 (+151)	33.11 (150) +30.31 (+128)	31.79 (144) +27.85 (+113)	(453) (−333)	49.88 (202) +16.77 (+52)	50.12 (203) +18.33 (+59)	(405) (−48)
North	Ballot 1							Ballot 2						Ballot 3					Ballot 4				Ballot 5		
Riding MLA (supported)	de Jong	Lee	Stone	Sull-ivan	Watts	Wilk-inson	Total	de Jong	Lee	Stone	Watts	Wilk-inson	Total	Lee	Stone	Watts	Wilk-inson	Total	Lee	Watts	Wilk-inson	Total	Watts	Wilk-inson	Total
Nechako Lakes; John Rustad (Wilkinson)	9.15 (13)	3.52 (5)	35.21 (50)	2.82 (4)	16.20 (23)	33.10 (47)	(142)	10.56 (15) +1.41 (+2)	4.23 (6) +0.71 (+1)	35.92 (51) +0.71 (+1)	16.20 (23) +0.00 (+0)	33.10 (47) +0.00 (+0)	(142) (0)	5.00 (7) +0.77 (+1)	38.57 (54) +2.65 (+3)	16.43 (23) +0.23 (+0)	40.00 (56) +6.90 (+9)	(140) (−2)	15.67 (21) +10.67 (+14)	26.87 (36) +10.44 (+13)	57.46 (77) +17.46 (+21)	(134) (−6)	35.11 (46) +8.24 (+10)	64.89 (85) +7.43 (+8)	(131) (−3)
North Coast	4.65 (14)	4.98 (15)	15.28 (46)	0.33 (1)	35.22 (106)	39.53 (119)	(301)	4.65 (14) +0.00 (+0)	5.32 (16) +0.34 (+1)	15.28 (46) +0.00 (+0)	35.22 (106) +0.00 (+0)	39.53 (119) +0.00 (+0)	(301) (0)	6.04 (18) +0.72 (+2)	16.78 (50) +1.50 (+4)	36.91 (110) +1.69 (+4)	40.27 (120) +0.74 (+1)	(298) (−3)	7.91 (22) +1.87 (+4)	42.45 (118) +5.54 (+8)	49.64 (138) +9.37 (+18)	(278) (−20)	46.74 (129) +4.29 (+11)	53.26 (147) +3.62 (+9)	(276) (−2)
Peace River North; Dan Davies (de Jong)	38.93 (116)	7.72 (23)	9.73 (29)	1.01 (3)	26.17 (78)	16.44 (49)	(298)	39.39 (117) +0.46 (+1)	8.08 (24) +0.36 (+1)	9.76 (29) +0.03 (+0)	26.26 (78) +0.09 (+0)	16.50 (49) +0.06 (+0)	(297) (−1)	12.41 (34) +4.33 (+10)	19.71 (54) +9.95 (+25)	33.21 (91) +6.95 (+13)	34.67 (95) +18.17 (+46)	(274) (−23)	17.97 (46) +5.56 (+12)	39.45 (101) +6.24 (+10)	42.58 (109) +7.91 (+14)	(256) (−18)	43.50 (107) +4.05 (+6)	56.50 (139) +13.92 (+30)	(246) (−10)
Peace River South; Mike Bernier (de Jong)	59.34 (54)	10.99 (10)	9.89 (9)	0.00 (0)	8.79 (8)	10.99 (10)	(91)	59.34 (54) +0.00 (+0)	10.99 (10) +0.00 (+0)	9.89 (9) +0.00 (+0)	8.79 (8) +0.00 (+0)	10.99 (10) +0.00 (+0)	(91) (0)	16.05 (13) +5.06 (+3)	22.22 (18) +12.33 (+9)	22.22 (18) +13.43 (+10)	39.51 (32) +28.52 (+22)	(81) (−10)	19.48 (15) +3.43 (+2)	35.06 (27) +12.84 (+9)	45.45 (35) +5.94 (+3)	(77) (−4)	44.59 (33) +9.53 (+6)	55.41 (41) +9.96 (+6)	(74) (−3)
Prince George-Mackenzie; Mike Morris (Wilkinson)	15.00 (51)	25.59 (87)	16.47 (56)	0.59 (2)	14.12 (48)	28.24 (96)	(340)	15.00 (51) +0.00 (+0)	25.59 (87) +0.00 (+0)	16.76 (57) +0.29 (+1)	14.12 (48) +0.00 (+0)	28.53 (97) +0.29 (+1)	(340) (0)	27.66 (91) +2.07 (+4)	20.06 (66) +3.30 (+9)	15.50 (51) +1.38 (+3)	36.78 (121) +8.25 (+24)	(329) (−11)	32.91 (104) +5.25 (+13)	19.62 (62) +4.12 (+11)	47.47 (150) +10.69 (+29)	(316) (−13)	28.73 (79) +9.11 (+17)	71.27 (196) +23.80 (+46)	(275) (−41)
Prince George-Valemount; Shirley Bond	13.07 (66)	33.47 (169)	16.04 (81)	0.00 (0)	16.44 (83)	20.99 (106)	(505)	13.07 (66) +0.00 (+0)	33.47 (169) +0.00 (+0)	16.04 (81) +0.00 (+0)	16.44 (83) +0.00 (+0)	20.99 (106) +0.00 (+0)	(505) (0)	35.33 (177) +1.86 (+8)	19.76 (99) +3.72 (+18)	17.96 (90) +1.52 (+7)	26.95 (135) +5.96 (+29)	(501) (−4)	42.18 (197) +6.85 (+20)	23.34 (109) +5.38 (+19)	34.48 (161) +7.53 (+26)	(467) (−34)	31.68 (128) +8.34 (+19)	68.32 (276) +33.84 (+115)	(404) (−63)
Skeena; Ellis Ross (Wilkinson)	11.11 (22)	4.55 (9)	14.14 (28)	0.00 (0)	23.23 (46)	46.97 (93)	(198)	11.11 (22) +0.00 (+0)	4.55 (9) +0.00 (+0)	14.14 (28) +0.00 (+0)	23.23 (46) +0.00 (+0)	46.97 (93) +0.00 (+0)	(198) (0)	4.71 (9) +0.16 (+0)	15.18 (29) +1.04 (+1)	25.65 (49) +2.42 (+3)	54.45 (104) +7.48 (+11)	(191) (−7)	6.91 (13) +2.20 (+4)	28.19 (53) +2.54 (+4)	64.89 (122) +10.44 (+18)	(188) (−3)	30.43 (56) +2.24 (+3)	69.57 (128) +4.68 (+6)	(184) (−4)
Stikine	14.43 (14)	3.09 (3)	25.77 (25)	0.00 (0)	35.05 (34)	21.65 (21)	(97)	14.43 (14) +0.00 (+0)	3.09 (3) +0.00 (+0)	25.77 (25) +0.00 (+0)	35.05 (34) +0.00 (+0)	21.65 (21) +0.00 (+0)	(97) (0)	3.26 (3) +0.17 (+0)	30.43 (28) +4.66 (+3)	39.13 (36) +4.08 (+2)	27.17 (25) +5.52 (+4)	(92) (−5)	13.95 (12) +10.69 (+9)	45.35 (39) +6.22 (+3)	40.70 (35) +13.53 (+10)	(86) (−6)	56.79 (46) +11.44 (+7)	43.21 (35) +2.51 (+0)	(81) (−5)

== See also ==
- British Columbia Liberal Party leadership elections
- 2011 British Columbia Liberal Party leadership election
