= Todd Stone =

Canadian politician

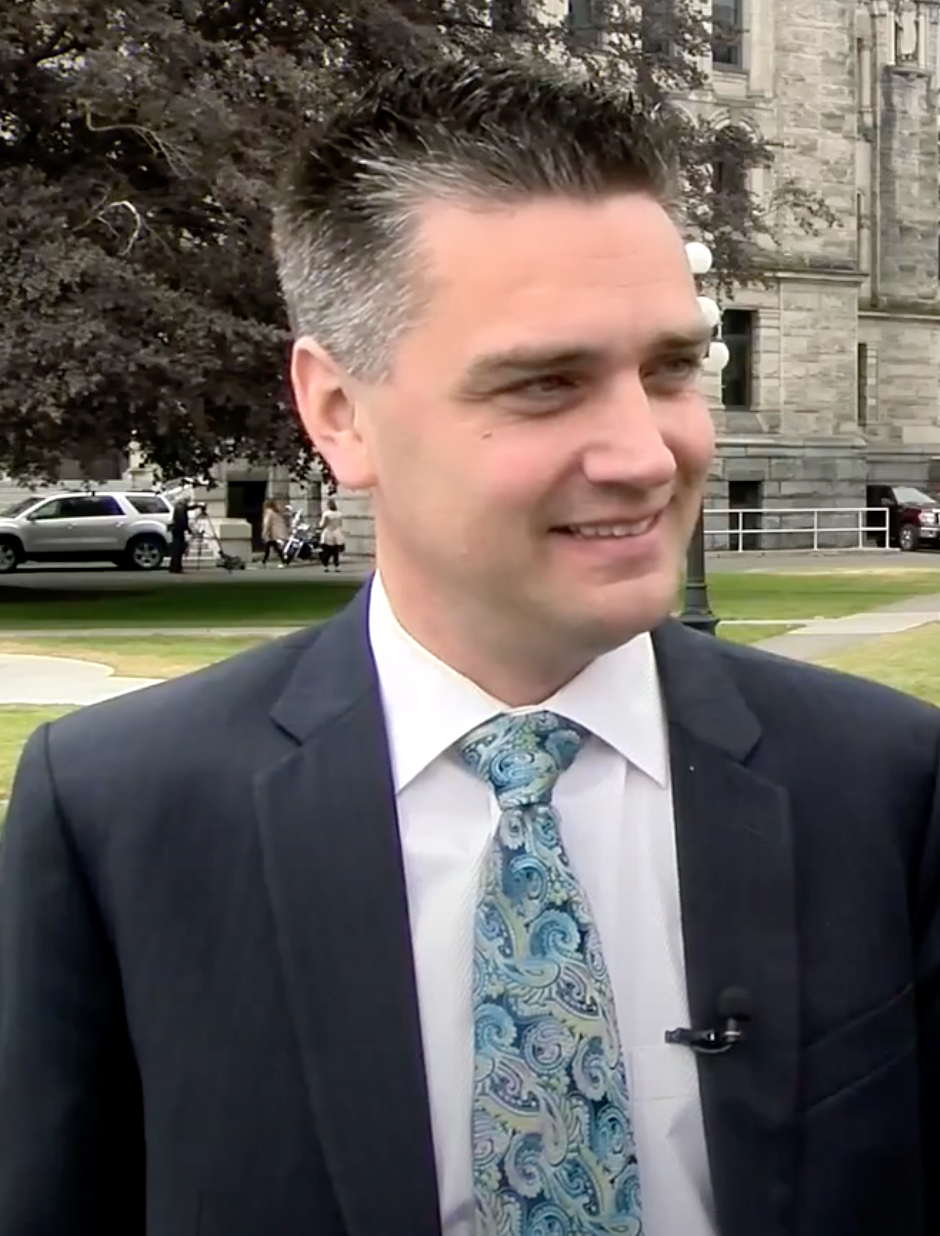
- Todd Stone in 2016

Member of the British Columbia Legislative Assembly for Kamloops-South Thompson
- In office May 14, 2013 – September 21, 2024
- Preceded by: Kevin Krueger
- Succeeded by: Electoral district dissolved

Minister of Transportation and Infrastructure of British Columbia
- In office June 10, 2013 – July 18, 2017
- Premier: Christy Clark
- Preceded by: Mary Polak
- Succeeded by: Claire Trevena

Personal details
- Party: BC Liberals
- Children: 3

Todd Graham Stone is a Canadian politician. He served as a member of the Legislative Assembly of British Columbia for Kamloops-South Thompson from 2013 to 2024 under the banner of the British Columbia Liberal Party (renamed BC United in 2023). Stone was Minister of Transportation and Infrastructure from 2013 to 2017.

In 2025, Stone became the president and CEO of the Association for Mineral Exploration BC.

== Political career ==
Stone was actively involved in the British Columbia Liberal Party from the 1990s. After being elected to the B.C. legislature in the 2013 provincial election, he was appointed as Minister of Transportation and Infrastructure. In this role, Stone increased speed limits to 120 km/h on rural highways and introduced legislation for ticketing improper use of passing lanes. Stone also served as Minister responsible for Emergency Management BC, and as Deputy House Leader.

After the BC Liberals lost their majority in the 2017 provincial election, Stone was appointed Official Opposition Critic for Municipal Affairs.

In October 2017, Stone entered the BC Liberal Party leadership election to replace former B.C. Premier Christy Clark. He lost to Andrew Wilkinson after four rounds of voting.

On February 7, 2022, Stone was appointed BC Liberal house leader and Official Opposition Critic for Jobs, Economic Recovery, Trade, & Innovation.

On August 29, 2024, Stone announced that he would not run in the October 2024 election, and he would support the B.C. Conservative Party candidate in his Kamloops riding. Stone took the action after the leader of BC United (formerly the B.C. Liberal Party) decided to withdraw the party from the election campaign and endorse the B.C. Conservative Party.

== Career outside politics ==
Before entering politics, Todd Stone was the founder and CEO of iCompass Technologies, a Kamloops-based software company.

In 2025, Stone was named the president and CEO of the Association for Mineral Exploration BC, an advocacy organization representing approximately 6,000 B.C. mineral producers.

Stone has served on the boards of Thompson Rivers University, the Kamloops Chamber of Commerce, the Insurance Corporation of British Columbia, and the Thompson-Nicola-Cariboo United Way.

== Personal life ==
Todd Stone met his wife, Chantelle, during an election campaign. They have three daughters.

== Electoral record ==
2020 British Columbia general election: Kamloops-South Thompson
Party	Candidate	Votes	%	±%	Expenditures
Liberal	Todd Stone	13,453	51.14	−4.64	$45,977.93
New Democratic	Anna Thomas	8,575	32.60	+10.70	$7,276.89
Green	Dan Hines	4,276	12.26	−4.60	$19,298.35
Total valid votes		26,304	100.00	–	
Total rejected ballots					
Turnout					
Registered voters					
Source: Elections BC

2017 British Columbia general election: Kamloops-South Thompson
Party	Candidate	Votes	%	±%	Expenditures
Liberal	Todd Stone	15,465	55.78	−1.33	$57,128
New Democratic	Nancy Bepple	6,072	21.90	−13.25	$18,044
Green	Donovan Cavers	5,783	20.86	–	$15,965
Libertarian	Jessica Lea Bradshaw	295	1.07	–	$135
Communist	Beat Klossner	109	0.38	–	
Total valid votes		27,724	100.00		
Total rejected ballots		144	0.52		
Turnout		27,868	64.60		
Source: Elections BC

2013 British Columbia general election: Kamloops-South Thompson
Party	Candidate	Votes	%	±%	Expenditures
Liberal	Todd Stone	14,956	57.11	+3.25	$158,697
New Democratic	Tom Friedman	9,204	35.15	+0.25	$85,161
Conservative	Peter Sharp	1,603	6.12	+1.44	$8,900
Independent	Brian Alexander	425	1.62	–	$6,135
Total valid votes		26,188	100.00		
Total rejected ballots		157	0.60		
Turnout		26,345	62.18		
Source: Elections BC
