= Kevin Krueger =

Canadian politician

Member of the British Columbia Legislative Assembly for Kamloops-South Thompson
- In office May 12, 2009 – May 14, 2013
- Preceded by: Riding Established
- Succeeded by: Todd Stone

Member of the British Columbia Legislative Assembly for Kamloops-North Thompson
- In office May 28, 1996 – May 12, 2009
- Preceded by: Frederick H. Jackson
- Succeeded by: Terry Lake

Minister of Social Development of British Columbia
- In office October 25, 2010 – March 14, 2011
- Premier: Gordon Campbell
- Preceded by: Rich Coleman (Housing and Social Development)
- Succeeded by: Harry Bloy

Minister of Tourism, Culture and the Arts of British Columbia
- In office June 10, 2009 – October 25, 2010
- Premier: Gordon Campbell
- Preceded by: Bill Bennett
- Succeeded by: Margaret MacDiarmid (Tourism)

Minister of Community Development of British Columbia
- In office January 19, 2009 – June 10, 2009
- Premier: Gordon Campbell
- Preceded by: Blair Lekstrom
- Succeeded by: Bill Bennett (Community and Rural Development)

Minister of Small Business and Revenue and Minister Responsible for Deregulation of British Columbia
- In office June 23, 2008 – January 19, 2009
- Premier: Gordon Campbell
- Preceded by: Rick Thorpe
- Succeeded by: Ida Chong (Small Business); Positions abolished (Revenue; Deregulation)

Minister of State for Mining of British Columbia
- In office February 7, 2007 – June 23, 2008
- Premier: Gordon Campbell
- Preceded by: Bill Bennett
- Succeeded by: Gordie Hogg

Personal details
- Born: 1955 or 1956 (age 70–71)
- Party: BC Liberal
- Other political affiliations: Liberal Party of Canada (ca. 1993)
- Spouse: Debbie Krueger

Kevin Krueger born 1955 is a former member of the Legislative Assembly of the Canadian province of British Columbia. He represented the riding of Kamloops-North Thompson from 1996 to 2009, and Kamloops-South Thompson from 2009 to 2013. As part of the BC Liberal Party caucus, he served in several cabinet posts under Premier Gordon Campbell.

== Biography ==
Before entering politics, Krueger worked for the Insurance Corporation of British Columbia (ICBC) for twenty years, serving as road safety regional manager in his final role at the corporation. He was a candidate for the federal Liberals in the 1993 federal election, coming in third in the riding of Kamloops.

He ran for the BC Liberals in the 1996 provincial election, defeating the incumbent New Democratic candidate Frederick H. Jackson to become member of the Legislative Assembly (MLA) for Kamloops-North Thompson. While the Liberals were in opposition, Krueger served as labour critic and caucus whip.

He was re-elected in that riding in the 2001 and 2005 elections, and was named to the cabinet by Premier Gordon Campbell in February 2007 as Minister of State for Mining, following Bill Bennett's resignation from the post. Krueger was re-assigned as Minister of Small Business and Revenue and Minister Responsible for Deregulation in June 2008, before being named Minister of Community Development in January 2009.

For the 2009 election, Krueger ran in the newly established riding of Kamloops-South Thompson, and was re-elected as MLA. He was named Minister of Tourism, Culture and the Arts in June 2009, before being re-assigned as Minister of Social Development in October 2010. He was not given a cabinet post when Christy Clark succeeded Campbell as premier in March 2011, and announced in June 2012 that he would not seek re-election as MLA in the following year's provincial election.

After finishing his term as MLA, he briefly returned to ICBC to work in management, before leaving in 2015 to launch a consulting business working with First Nations. In the same year he was given an honorary doctorate by Thompson Rivers University.

He and his wife Debbie have three children together.

== Electoral history ==
B.C. General Election 2009: Kamloops-South Thompson
Party	Candidate	Votes	%	±	Expenditures
Liberal	Kevin Krueger	12,548	53.86%	–	$100,532
NDP	Tom Friedman	8,132	34.90%		$45,531
Green	Bev Markle	1,529	6.56%	–	$3,658
Conservative	Maria Dobi	1,090	4.68%		$5,548
Total Valid Votes		23,299	100%		
Total Rejected Ballots		97	0.41%		
Turnout		23,396	57.56%		

B.C. General Election 2005: Kamloops-North Thompson
Party	Candidate	Votes	%	±	Expenditures
Liberal	Kevin Krueger	11,648	48.36%	–	$114,377
NDP	Mike Hanson	9,635	40.00%		$70,259
Green	Grant Fraser	1,689	7.01%	–	$2,268
Conservative	Bob Altenhofen	795	3.30%		$1,511
Marijuana	Keenan Todd	321	1.33%		$100
Total Valid Votes		24,088	100%		
Total Rejected Ballots		150	0.62%		
Turnout		24,238	67.71%		

B.C. General Election 2001: Kamloops-North Thompson
Party	Candidate	Votes	%	±	Expenditures
Liberal	Kevin Krueger	12,676	58.04%	–	$46,310
NDP	Dwayne Hartle	4,181	19.14%		$24,205
Green	Denis J. Walsh	3,122	14.29%	–	$4,398
Marijuana	Vern Falk	1,025	4.69%		$3,765
Unity	R.H. (Bob) Altenhofen	836	3.84%	–	$5,587
Total valid votes		21,840	100.00%		
Total rejected ballots		172	0.79%		
Turnout		22,012	72.65%		

B.C. General Election 1996: Kamloops-North Thompson
Party	Candidate	Votes	%	±	Expenditures
Liberal	Kevin Krueger	7,313	43.43%	–	$54,922
NDP	Frederick H. Jackson	6,945	41.25%		$24,546
Reform	Alan Forseth	1,710	10.16%	–	$9,123
Social Credit	Steve Quinn	468	2.78%	–	$6,908
Green	Alan Child	401	2.38%	–	$295
Total valid votes		16,837	100.00%		
Total rejected ballots		118	0.70%		
Turnout		16,955	72.65%		

1993 Canadian federal election: Kamloops
Party	Candidate	Votes	%	±%
New Democratic	Nelson Riis	15,182	36.62	-15.68
Reform	Keith Raddatz	10,957	26.43	+25.27
Liberal	Kevin Krueger	10,040	24.22	+11.06
Progressive Conservative	Frank Coldicott	3,526	8.50	-23.90
National	Kathrine Wunderlich	1,398	3.37	–
Libertarian	Randall Edge	152	0.37	–
Natural Law	Mark McCooey	122	0.29	–
Canada Party	Marion Munday	43	0.10	–
Independent	Thomas Brown	40	0.10	–
Total valid votes		41,460	100.0	
New Democratic hold		Swing		-20.48
