= Kamloops-South Thompson =

Defunct provincial electoral district in British Columbia, Canada

British Columbia electoral district
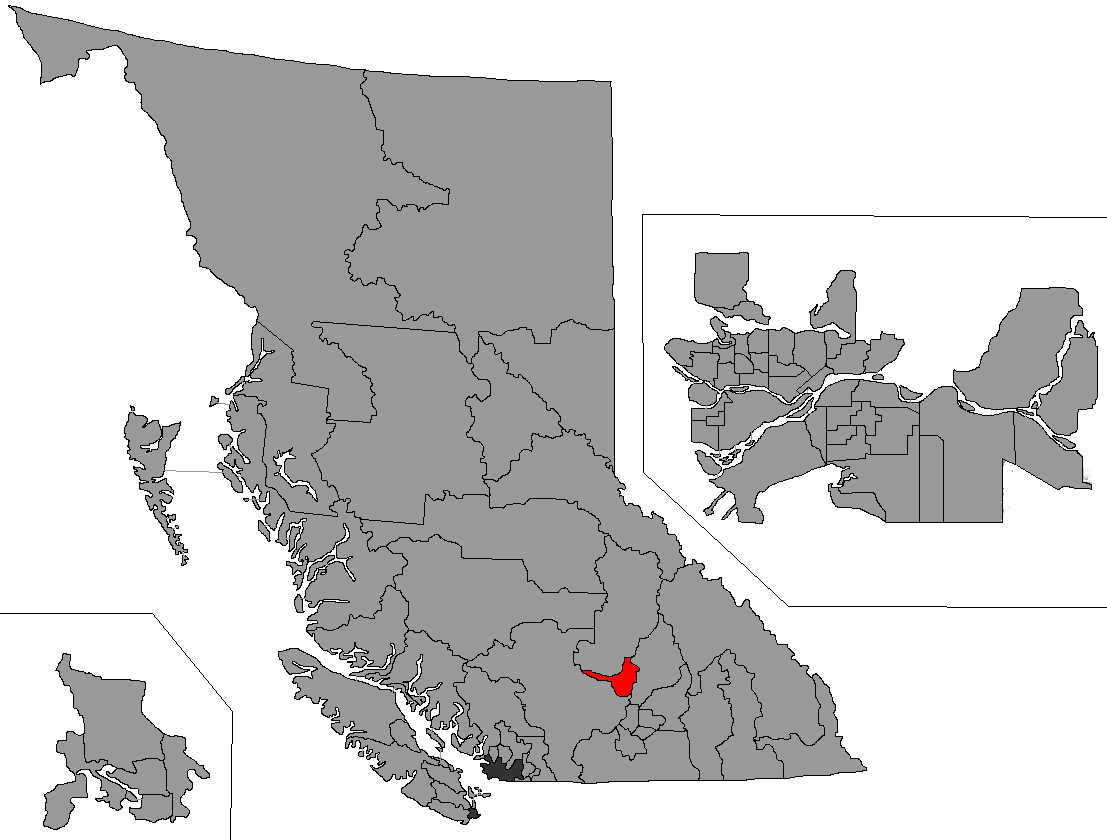

Provincial electoral district
- Legislature: Legislative Assembly of British Columbia
MLA
Todd Stone
BC United
- District created: 2008
- First contested: 2009
- Last contested: 2020

Kamloops-South Thompson is a former provincial electoral district in British Columbia, Canada, in use from 2009 to 2024.

The district was established by the Electoral Districts Act, 2008 and first contested in the 2009 general election. Under the 2021 British Columbia electoral redistribution that effect for the 2024 general election, both this riding and its sibling Kamloops-North Thompson were significantly reorganized, resulting in much of the eastern and rural portions of Kamloops-South Thompson's population being redistributed into Kamloops-North Thompson and the creation of the new district of Kamloops Centre taking in much of its western end.

== Geography ==
As of the 2020 provincial election, Kamloops-South Thompson comprised the eastern portion of the Thompson-Nicola Regional District. It was located in central British Columbia. Communities in the electoral district consisted of Kamloops, south of the Thompson river and Chase.

== Member of the Legislative Assembly ==
On account of the realignment of electoral boundaries, most incumbents did not represent the entirety of their listed district during the preceding legislative term. Claude Richmond, British Columbia Liberal Party was initially elected during the 2005 election to the Kamloops riding and didn't seek re-election. Kevin Krueger, BC Liberal sought re-election in the adjacent redrawn riding of Kamloops-South Thompson during the 2009 election rather than in the riding of Kamloops-North Thompson.

== History ==
| Assembly | Years | Member | Party |
|---|---|---|---|
Part of Kamloops prior to 2009
| 39th | 2009–2013 | Kevin Krueger | Liberal |
| 40th | 2013–2017 | Todd Stone | Liberal |
| 41st | 2017–2020 | Todd Stone | Liberal |
| 42nd | 2020–2023 | Todd Stone | Liberal |
| 42nd | 2023–2024 | Todd Stone | BC United |

== Electoral history ==
2020 British Columbia general election
| Party | Candidate | Votes | % | ±% | Expenditures |
|---|---|---|---|---|---|
| Liberal | Todd Stone | 13,453 | 51.14 | −4.64 | $45,977.93 |
| New Democratic | Anna Thomas | 8,575 | 32.60 | +10.70 | $7,276.89 |
| Green | Dan Hines | 4,276 | 12.26 | −4.60 | $19,298.35 |
| Total valid votes | | 26,304 | 100.00 | – | |
| Total rejected ballots | | | | | |
| Turnout | | | | | |
| Registered voters | | | | | |
Source: Elections BC

2017 British Columbia general election
| Party | Candidate | Votes | % | ±% | Expenditures |
|---|---|---|---|---|---|
| Liberal | Todd Stone | 15,465 | 55.78 | −1.33 | $57,128 |
| New Democratic | Nancy Bepple | 6,072 | 21.90 | −13.25 | $18,044 |
| Green | Donovan Cavers | 5,783 | 20.86 | – | $15,965 |
| Libertarian | Jessica Lea Bradshaw | 295 | 1.07 | – | $135 |
| Communist | Beat Klossner | 109 | 0.38 | – | |
| Total valid votes | | 27,724 | 100.00 | | |
| Total rejected ballots | | 144 | 0.52 | | |
| Turnout | | 27,868 | 64.60 | | |
Source: Elections BC

2013 British Columbia general election
| Party | Candidate | Votes | % | ±% | Expenditures |
|---|---|---|---|---|---|
| Liberal | Todd Stone | 14,956 | 57.11 | +3.25 | $158,697 |
| New Democratic | Tom Friedman | 9,204 | 35.15 | +0.25 | $85,161 |
| Conservative | Peter Sharp | 1,603 | 6.12 | +1.44 | $8,900 |
| Independent | Brian Alexander | 425 | 1.62 | – | $6,135 |
| Total valid votes | | 26,188 | 100.00 | | |
| Total rejected ballots | | 157 | 0.60 | | |
| Turnout | | 26,345 | 62.18 | | |
Source: Elections BC

B.C. General Election 2009 Kamloops-South Thompson
| Party | Candidate | Votes | % | ± | Expenditures |
|---|---|---|---|---|---|
| Liberal | Kevin Krueger | 12,548 | 53.86% | – | $100,532 |
| NDP | Tom Friedman | 8,132 | 34.90% | | $45,531 |
| Green | Bev Markle | 1,529 | 6.56% | – | $3,658 |
| Conservative | Maria Dobi | 1,090 | 4.68% | | $5,548 |
| Total Valid Votes | | 23,299 | 100% | | |
| Total Rejected Ballots | | 97 | 0.41% | | |
| Turnout | | 23,396 | 57.56% | | |

== See also ==
- List of British Columbia provincial electoral districts
- Canadian provincial electoral districts
