= Frederick Henry Jackson =

Canadian politician

Frederick H. Jackson
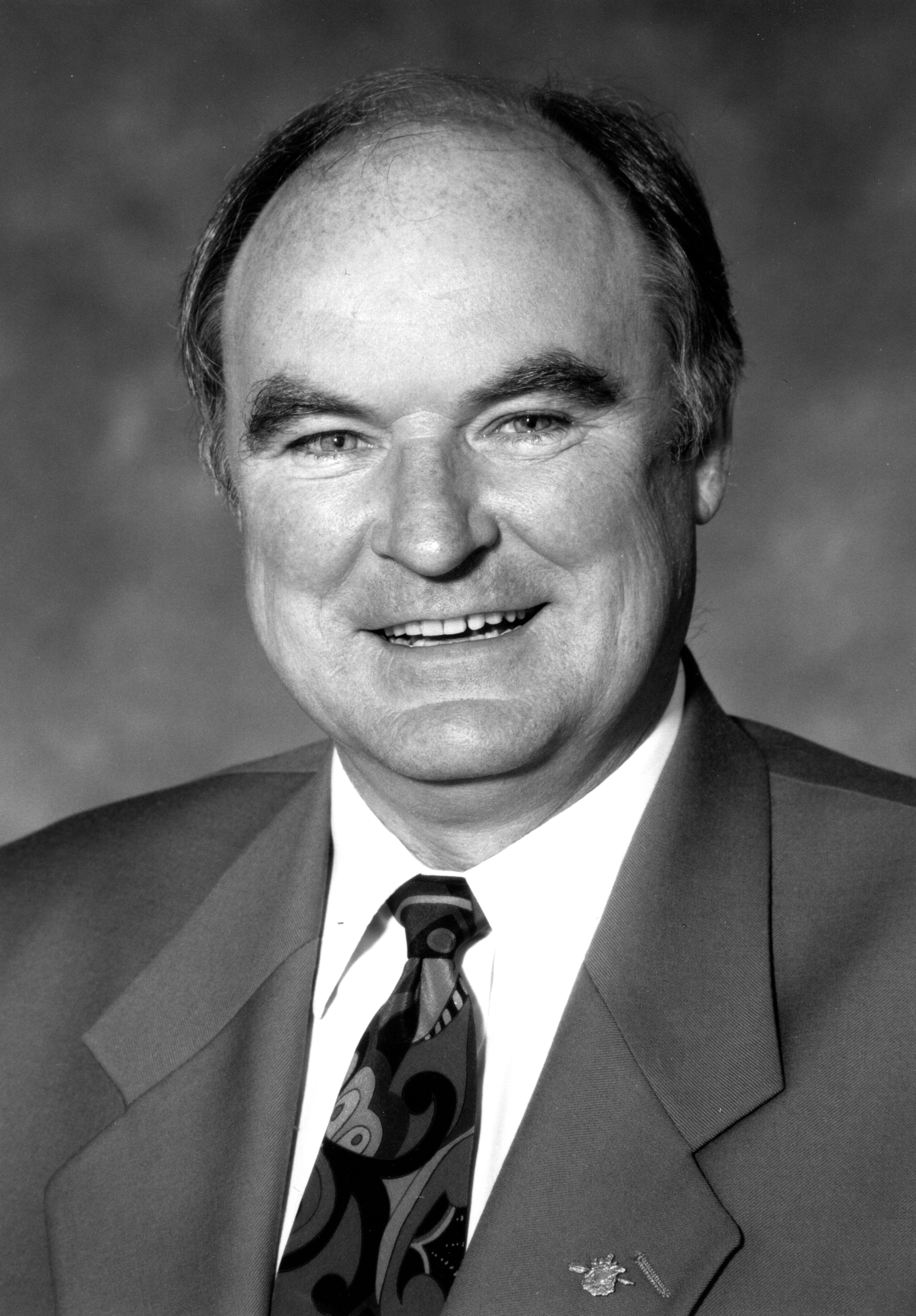

MLA for Kamloops-North Thompson
- In office 1991–1996

Personal details
- Born: January 27, 1938 Alva, Scotland
- Died: February 28, 2003 (aged 65) Victoria, British Columbia
- Party: British Columbia New Democratic Party

Frederick Henry Jackson (January 27, 1938 – February 28, 2003) was a Canadian politician. He served in the Legislative Assembly of British Columbia from 1991 to 1996, as a NDP member for the constituency of Kamloops-North Thompson. He was defeated in the 1996 provincial election by Liberal Party candidate Kevin Krueger.
