= Kamloops-North Thompson =

Provincial electoral district in British Columbia, Canada

British Columbia electoral district
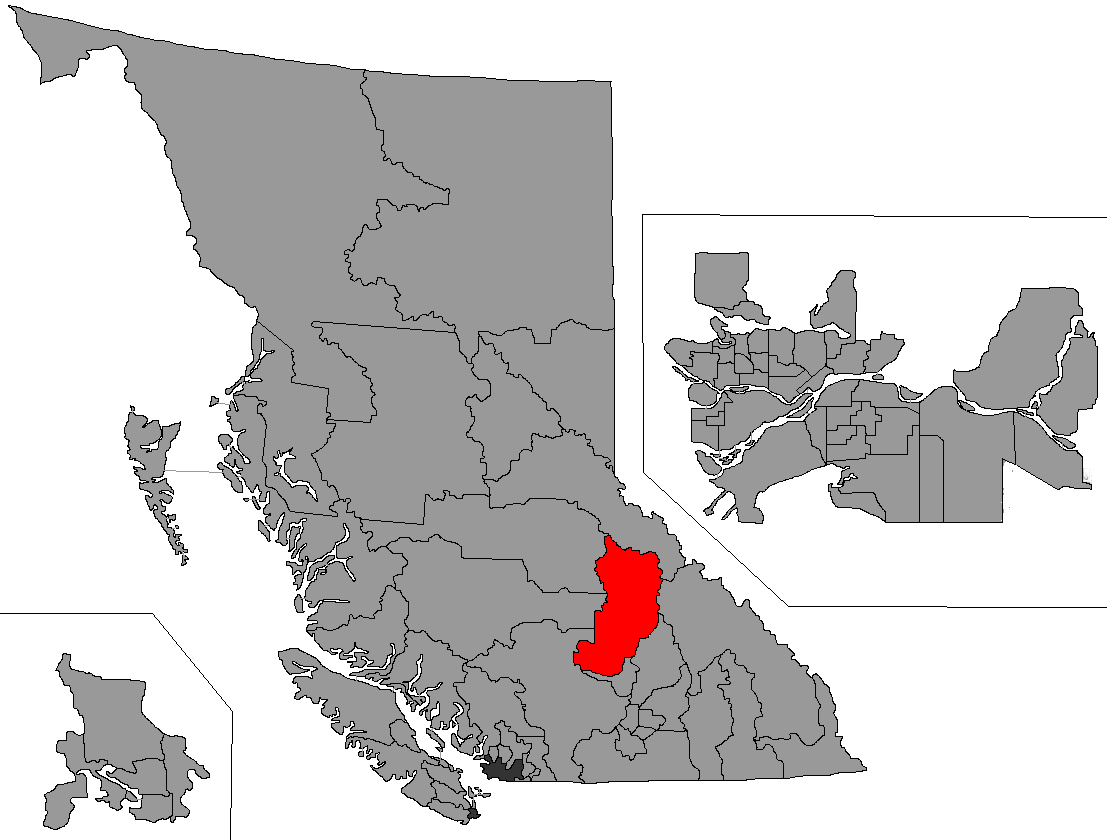

Provincial electoral district
- Legislature: Legislative Assembly of British Columbia
MLA
Ward Stamer
Conservative
- First contested: 1991
- Last contested: 2026

Demographics
- Population (2001): 48,482
- Area (km²): 21,224.16
- Pop. density (per km²): 2.3

Kamloops-North Thompson is a provincial electoral district for the Legislative Assembly of British Columbia, Canada.

It was formerly considered a political bellwether for the next provincial government, having swung to the governing party ever since party politics was introduced into British Columbia. This trend broke in 2017, when the district was won by a BC Liberal despite a BC NDP government being sworn in.

== Demographics ==
Population	48,482
Population Change, 1996–2001	1.6%
Area (km^{2})	21,224.16
Pop. Density	2.3

== Geography ==
As of the 2020 provincial election, Kamloops-North Thompson comprises the northeastern portion of the Thompson-Nicola Regional District. It is located in central British Columbia. Communities in the electoral district consist of Kamloops, north of the Thompson river, Clearwater, and Barriere.

== Members of the Legislative Assembly ==
Kamloops-North Thompson
Assembly	Years	Member	Party
Riding created from Kamloops
35th	1991–1996	Frederick Henry Jackson	New Democratic
36th	1996–2001	Kevin Krueger	Liberal
37th	2001–2005	Kevin Krueger	Liberal
38th	2005–2009	Kevin Krueger	Liberal
39th	2009–2013	Terry Lake	Liberal
40th	2013–2017	Terry Lake	Liberal
41st	2017–2020	Peter Milobar	Liberal
42nd	2020–2023	Peter Milobar	Liberal
42nd	2023–2024	Peter Milobar	BC United
42nd	2024–2024	Peter Milobar	Conservative
43rd	2024–2026	Ward Stamer	Conservative
44th	2026–present	Ward Stamer	Conservative

== Election results ==
2026 British Columbia general election
Party	Candidate	Votes	%	±%	Expenditures
Conservative	Ward Stamer	17,232	64.78	+5.04	
New Democratic	Kory Clark	7,617	28.63	-4.27	
OneBC	Deborah Friesen	1,670	6.28		
Total valid votes		26,519	99.69		
Total rejected ballots		83	0.31		
Turnout					
Registered voters					
Conservative hold		Swing		+4.66	
Source: Elections BC

2024 British Columbia general election
Party	Candidate	Votes	%	±%	Expenditures
Conservative	Ward Stamer	17,930	59.74	+55.1	$23,793.91
New Democratic	Maddi Genn	9,874	32.90	-0.6	$24,324.38
Green	Tristan Cavers	2,209	7.36	-4.3	$0.00
Total valid votes/expense limit		30,013	99.83	–	$71,700.08
Total rejected ballots		51	0.17	–	
Turnout		30,064	61.86	–	
Registered voters		48,598			
Conservative notional gain from BC United		Swing		N/A (Note: Swing cannot be calculated as BC United did not run a candidate in this riding.)	
Source: Elections BC

2020 provincial election redistributed results
Party	%
Liberal	49.8
New Democratic	33.5
Green	11.7
Conservative	4.6

2020 British Columbia general election
Party	Candidate	Votes	%	±%	Expenditures
Liberal	Peter Milobar	9,341	40.99	−7.33	$59,084.81
New Democratic	Sadie Hunter	9,145	40.13	+9.78	$18,663.02
Green	Thomas Martin	2,224	9.76	−10.80	$9,496.78
Conservative	Dennis Giesbrecht	1,928	8.46	–	$2,954.19
Independent	Brandon Russell	149	0.65	–	$995.20
Total valid votes		22,787	100.00	–	
Total rejected ballots					
Turnout					
Registered voters					
Source: Elections BC

2017 British Columbia general election
Party	Candidate	Votes	%	±%	Expenditures
Liberal	Peter Milobar	12,001	48.32	−3.74	$47,484
New Democratic	Barb Nederpel	7,538	30.35	−8.7	$68,758
Green	Dan Hines	5,111	20.58	–	$17,164
Communist	Peter Paul Kerek	187	0.75	–	
Total valid votes		24,837	100.00		
Total rejected ballots		200	0.80		
Turnout		25,037	60.34		
Source: Elections BC

2013 British Columbia general election
Party	Candidate	Votes	%	±%	Expenditures
Liberal	Terry Lake	12,183	52.06	+5.1	$124,595
New Democratic	Kathy Kendall	9,139	39.05	–5.9	$84,911
Conservative	Ed Klop	1,644	7.03	–	$9,211
No affiliation	John Ford	436	1.86	–	$250
Total valid votes		23,402	100.00		
Total rejected ballots		141	0.60		
Turnout		23,543	57.97		
Source: Elections BC

B.C. General Election 2009: Kamloops-North Thompson
Party	Candidate	Votes	%	±	Expenditures
Liberal	Terry Lake	9,830	47%	n/a	$108,572
New Democratic	Doug Brown	9,320	45%	n/a	$84,848
Green	April Snowe	1,418	7%	n/a	$1,010
Refederation	Wayne Russell	251	1%	n/a	$260
Work Less	Keston Broughton	124	0.6%	n/a	$550
Total Valid Votes		20,943	100%		
Total Rejected Ballots		112	0.5%		
Turnout		21,055	55%		

B.C. General Election 2005: Kamloops-North Thompson
Party	Candidate	Votes	%	±	Expenditures
Liberal	Kevin Krueger	11,648	48.36%	–	$114,377
NDP	Mike Hanson	9,635	40.00%		$70,259
Green	Grant Fraser	1,689	7.01%	–	$2,268
Conservative	Bob Altenhofen	795	3.30%		$1,511
Marijuana	Keenan Todd	321	1.33%		$100
Total Valid Votes		24,088	100%		
Total Rejected Ballots		150	0.62%		
Turnout		24,238	67.71%		

B.C. General Election 2001: Kamloops-North Thompson
Party	Candidate	Votes	%	±	Expenditures
Liberal	Kevin Krueger	12,676	58.04%	–	$46,310
NDP	Dwayne Hartle	4,181	19.14%		$24,205
Green	Denis J. Walsh	3,122	14.29%	–	$4,398
Marijuana	Vern Falk	1,025	4.69%		$3,765
Unity	R.H. (Bob) Altenhofen	836	3.84%	–	$5,587
Total valid votes		21,840	100.00%		
Total rejected ballots		172	0.79%		
Turnout		22,012	72.65%		

B.C. General Election 1996: Kamloops-North Thompson
Party	Candidate	Votes	%	±	Expenditures
Liberal	Kevin Krueger	7,313	43.43%	–	$54,922
NDP	Frederick H. Jackson	6,945	41.25%		$24,546
Reform	Alan Forseth	1,710	10.16%	–	$9,123
Social Credit	Steve Quinn	468	2.78%	–	$6,908
Green	Alan Child	401	2.38%	–	$295
Total valid votes		16,837	100.00%		
Total rejected ballots		118	0.70%		
Turnout		16,955	72.65%		

B.C. General Election 1991: Kamloops-North Thompson
Party	Candidate	Votes	%	±	Expenditures
NDP	Frederick H. Jackson	5,843	39.43%		$27,214
Social Credit	Paul Caissie	4,283	28.90%	–	$44,425
Liberal	John E. Harwood	4,694	31.67%	–	$2,650
Total valid votes		14,820	100.00%		
Total rejected ballots		227	1.51%		
Turnout		15,047	74.02%		

== See also ==
- List of British Columbia provincial electoral districts
- Canadian provincial electoral districts
