= 2017 British Columbia general election =

Canadian provincial election

- May 9, 2017

87 seats in the Legislative Assembly of British Columbia 44 seats were needed for a majority
- Opinion polls
- Turnout: 61.2% ▲5.9 pp
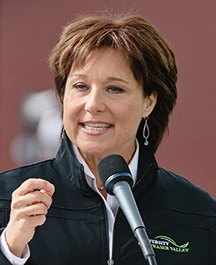

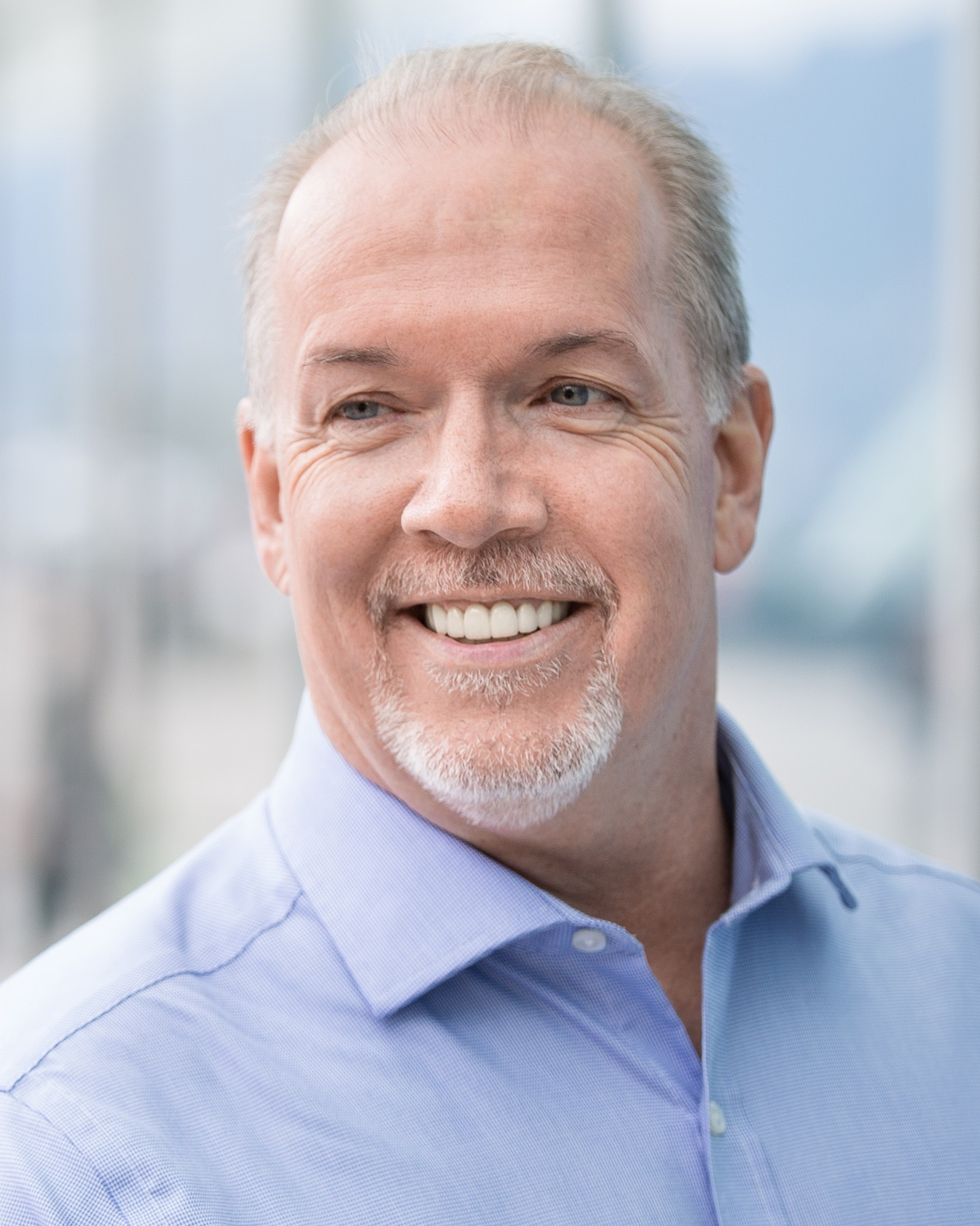

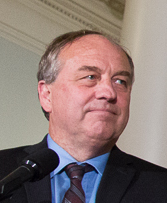
	First party	Second party	Third party
Leader	Christy Clark	John Horgan	Andrew Weaver
Party	Liberal	New Democratic	Green
Leader since	February 26, 2011	May 4, 2014	December 9, 2015
Leader's seat	Kelowna West	Langford-Juan de Fuca	Oak Bay-Gordon Head
Last election	49 seats, 44.1%	34 seats, 39.7%	1 seat, 8.1%
Seats before	47	35	1
Seats won	43	41	3
Seat change	▼4	▲6	▲2
Popular vote	797,194	795,527	332,331
Percentage	40.37%	40.29%	16.83%
Swing	▼3.8 pp	▲0.6 pp	▲8.7 pp
- Popular vote by riding. As this is an FPTP election, seat totals are not determined by popular vote, but instead via results by each riding. Click the map for more details.

- Composition of the Legislative Assembly after the election
Premier before election
Christy Clark
Liberal
Premier after election
Christy Clark (Note: Following the election, Christy Clark's Liberal minority government was sworn in. On June 29, 2017, Clark's government was defeated in a confidence vote, prompting her resignation. Lieutenant Governor Judith Guichon then invited NDP leader John Horgan to form a minority government with Green support. Clark's resignation was effective July 18, 2017, at which time Horgan was sworn in as premier.)
Liberal

The 2017 British Columbia general election was held on May 9, 2017, to elect 87 members (MLAs) to the Legislative Assembly to serve in the 41st Parliament of the Canadian province of British Columbia. In the 40th Parliament prior to this general election, the British Columbia Liberal Party formed the government under the leadership of Christy Clark, while the British Columbia New Democratic Party (NDP), under the leadership of Adrian Dix and then John Horgan, formed the Official Opposition; the Green Party of British Columbia were also represented in the legislature with sole MLA and later leader Andrew Weaver.

It was the first election contested on a new electoral map completed in 2015, and the total number of constituencies had increased from 85 to 87. New districts were added in Richmond and Surrey, while the boundaries of 48 existing electoral districts were adjusted.

The election saw no party win a majority of seats for the first time since the 1952 election: the Liberals won 43 seats, the NDP won 41 seats and the Greens won three seats. From 1952 to 2017, especially in the 2005 to 2017 period, often a single party that had not received a majority of the votes cast had achieved a majority of seats and held power.

As no one party held a majority of seats, a working majority had to be forged. After a period of negotiating, on May 29 Green Party leaders agreed to provide confidence and supply to an NDP government. Clark meanwhile indicated she would remain in office and seek the confidence of the legislature. On June 29, the opposition MLAs voted against Clark's speech from the throne, and Lieutenant Governor Judith Guichon, having rejected Clark's request to dissolve parliament, invited NDP leader Horgan to form a government. On July 18, Horgan became the new premier. The Greens maintained the NDP government in power, although Weaver and the other Green MLAs did not join the cabinet and were not given any official roles in the government.

The election was notable in that it marked the end of the Liberal majority government that had led the province since the 2001 election, and the first election in Canada at the federal or provincial level that saw more than one member of a Green party elected.

== Redistribution of ridings ==
An act was passed in 2015 providing for an increase of seats from 85 to 87, upon the next election. The following changes were made:

Abolished ridings	New ridings
Renamings
Alberni-Pacific Rim	Mid Island-Pacific Rim (Note: Also taking in part of Comox Valley.)
Chilliwack-Hope (Note: Parts went to Fraser-Nicola and West Vancouver-Sea to Sky.)	Chilliwack-Kent
Comox Valley	Courtenay-Comox
Esquimalt-Royal Roads	Esquimalt-Metchosin (Note: Also taking in part of Juan de Fuca.)
Fort Langley-Aldergrove	Langley East (Note: Also taking in part of Langley.)
Juan de Fuca	Langford-Juan de Fuca
Surrey-Tynehead	Surrey-Guildford (Note: Also taking in part of Surrey-Whalley.)
Westside-Kelowna	Kelowna West
Drawn from other ridings
	Surrey South (Note: From parts of Surrey-Cloverdale and Surrey-Panorama.)
Reorganization of ridings
Richmond Centre; Richmond East	Richmond North Centre; Richmond-Queensborough (Note: Also taking in part of New Westminster.); Richmond South Centre (Note: Also taking in part of Richmond-Steveston.)

== Timing ==
Section 23 of British Columbia's Constitution Act provides that general elections occur on the second Tuesday in May of the fourth calendar year after the last election. As an election was held on May 14, 2013, the subsequent election was conducted on May 9, 2017. The same section, though, makes the fixed election date subject to the Lieutenant Governor's right to dissolve the Legislative Assembly as he or she sees fit (in practice, on the advice of the Premier).

The writ was dropped on April 11, 2017. Advance voter registration ended April 11. Advance voting was from April 29 to 30, then began again May 3 and lasted until May 6 before the general election on May 9.

== Background ==
In the 2013 general election, the BC Liberal Party under the leadership of Premier Christy Clark were re-elected with a majority government. The British Columbia New Democratic Party, under the leadership of Adrian Dix, again formed the Official Opposition with a slightly reduced total of 34 seats. Despite the victory, Clark was defeated by NDP candidate David Eby in her riding of Vancouver-Point Grey but was later elected in the Westside-Kelowna riding by-election in July 2013 following Ben Stewart's resignation of his seat the previous month so that she could return to the Legislature. The Green Party, under leader Jane Sterk, won its first seat in the legislature, though Sterk herself was not elected. Dix resigned as NDP leader following the election and was succeeded by Horgan in the NDP 2014 leadership election. On August 13, 2013, Sterk announced she would resign as Green Party leader; Adam Olsen was appointed interim leader on August 25, 2013. The Conservative Party, under the leadership of John Cummins, failed to win a seat and Cummins resigned after the Westside-Kelowna by-election. On February 2, 2016, two by-elections occurred in Vancouver-Mount Pleasant and Coquitlam-Burke Mountain to replace Jenny Kwan and Douglas Horne, who had both resigned to seek election in the 2015 Canadian federal election.

In preparation for the 2017 provincial election, the Electoral Boundaries Commission Amendment Act, 2014 increased the number of electoral districts from 85 to 87 and required that the number of electoral districts in the North, Cariboo-Thompson, and the Columbia-Kootenay regions not be decreased despite their lower populations since the last adjustment of electoral boundaries. The Electoral Districts Act was updated in November 2015 to establish the new electoral districts, adding one new electoral district in Surrey and one in Richmond. Additionally, the boundaries of 48 existing electoral districts were adjusted.

The Election Amendment Act, 2015 required the chief electoral officer to provide each party with a copy of the voters list, allowed constituency associations to incur election expenses, limited vouching to amend voter information to only family members of the voter, and eliminated the 60-day pre-campaign period, including its expense limits.

== Election spending and fundraising ==
According to Elections BC, each candidate's campaign was permitted spend a maximum of $77,674 over the 28 day election period and each political party, in addition, could spend $4,882,405. Also, each third party advertiser could spend up to $3,329 in a single electoral district and up to $166,445 overall.

Unlike the federal government or most provinces, British Columbia has no limits on political donations. Wealthy individuals, corporations, unions and even non-citizens and non-residents are allowed to donate large amounts to political parties there. On January 13, 2017, The New York Times published a story calling British Columbia the "Wild West" of Canadian political cash. According to The New York Times, "critics of [Premier Clark] and her party, the conservative British Columbia Liberal Party, say the provincial government has been transformed into a lucrative business, dominated by special interests that trade donations for political favors, undermining Canada's reputation for functional, consensus-driven democracy." The article also explored Premier Clark's practice of taking an additional salary from the BC Liberals, beyond her Premier salary, financed by political contributions. The Globe and Mail also followed up with a special investigation of "British Columbia: The 'wild west' of fundraising". The investigation found that lobbyists are giving tens of thousands of dollars in their own name – and some power brokers are breaking one of the few rules the province has in place. With no limits on political donations in BC, the provincial Liberals raised $12.4 million last year – $4.5 million from individuals and $7.9 million from corporations.

On March 5, 2017, Elections BC announced it was launching a probe into Liberal Party fundraising. The Official Opposition, the NDP, promised to ban corporate and union donation if elected, as well as limits on individual donations but continued to accept corporate and union donations at the time. The Green Party announced in September 2016 that it would no longer accept donations from corporations or unions.

In terms of election spending, British Columbia had no spending limits ahead of the election period. During the 2009 election period, there was a spending limit of $4.4 million. Spending limits for the 2017 election period were adjusted for changes to the consumer price index before being confirmed during the second week in April 2017.

Party	Leader	Expenditures	Notes
British Columbia Liberal Party	Christy Clark	$13,596,359	The BC Liberals had formed a majority government since May 2001.
British Columbia New Democratic Party	John Horgan	$7,908,697	The BC NDP had formed the official opposition since May 2005.
Green Party of British Columbia	Andrew Weaver	$904,876	
British Columbia Conservative Party	(Vacant)	$39,043	
Christian Heritage Party of British Columbia	Rod Taylor	$23,133	
British Columbia Libertarian Party	Clayton Welwood	$9,913	
British Columbia Social Credit Party	(Vacant)	$5,940	

== Endorsements ==
Green Party

- David Suzuki

Liberal Party

- Globe and Mail
- Vancouver Sun

== Retiring incumbents ==
Liberals

- Bill Bennett, Kootenay East
- Gordon Hogg, Surrey-White Rock
- Terry Lake, Kamloops-North Thompson
- Don McRae, Comox Valley
- Moira Stilwell, Vancouver-Langara

Independent

- Pat Pimm, Peace River North
- Vicki Huntington, Delta South

New Democrats

- Robin Austin, Skeena
- Kathy Corrigan, Burnaby-Deer Lake
- Sue Hammell, Surrey-Green Timbers
- Maurine Karagianis, Esquimalt-Royal Roads
- Norm Macdonald, Columbia River-Revelstoke
- Bill Routley, Cowichan Valley
- Jane Shin, Burnaby-Lougheed

== Results ==
Elections to the 41st Legislative Assembly of British Columbia (2017)
Party	Leader	Candidates	Votes				Seats		
Party	Leader	Candidates	#	±	%	Change (pp)	2013	2017	±
Liberal	Christy Clark	87	797,194	1,920▲	40.37	-3.76	49	43 / 87	6▼
New Democratic	John Horgan	87	795,527	79,672▲	40.29	0.56	34	41 / 87	7▲
Green	Andrew Weaver	83	332,331	185,646▲	16.83	8.69	1	3 / 87	2▲
Independent		33	22,122	27,184▼	1.12	-1.62	1	0 / 85	1▼
Conservative		10	10,421	75,216▼	0.53	-4.22			
Libertarian	Clayton Welwood	30	7,743	5,693▲	0.39	0.28			
Christian Heritage	Rod Taylor	5	3,398	2,570▲	0.17	0.13			
Your Political Party	James Filippelli	10	1,137	609▲	0.06	0.03			
Social Credit		2	894	520▲	0.05	0.02			
Communist	Timothy Gidora	6	798	409▲	0.04	0.02			
Vancouver Island Party	Robin Richardson	4	641	641▲	0.03	New			
Land Air Water	Mervyn Ritchie	1	580	580▲	0.03	New			
BC First	Salvatore Vetro	1	543	732▼	0.03	−0.04%			
Refederation		3	463	463▲	0.02%	Returned			
New Republican	Wei Chen	1	318	318▲	0.02	New			
Cascadia	Troy Gibbons	2	248	248▲	0.01	New			
BC Action		2	205	205▲	0.01	Returned			
Citizens First	Phillip Ryan	1	90	90▲	–	New			
4BC	Erik Deutscher	1	59	59▲	–	New			
Total		369	1,974,712		100.00%				

=== Vote and seat summaries ===
Ternary plots – shift of electoral support (2013–2017)
2013

2017
Electoral districts identified by colours of winning parties

== MLAs elected ==
Abbotsford-Mission: Simon Gibson
Abbotsford South: Darryl Plecas
Abbotsford West: Mike de Jong
Boundary-Similkameen: Linda Larson
Burnaby-Deer Lake: Anne Kang
Burnaby-Edmonds: Raj Chouhan
Burnaby-Lougheed: Katrina Chen
Burnaby North: Janet Routledge
Cariboo-Chilcotin: Donna Barnett
Cariboo North: Coralee Oakes
Chilliwack: John Martin
Chilliwack-Kent: Laurie Throness
Columbia River-Revelstoke: Doug Clovechok
Coquitlam-Burke Mountain: Joan Isaacs
Coquitlam-Maillardville: Selina Robinson
Courtenay-Comox: Ronna-Rae Leonard
Cowichan Valley: Sonia Furstenau
Delta North: Ravi Kahlon
Delta South: Ian Paton
Esquimalt-Metchosin: Mitzi Dean
Fraser-Nicola: Jackie Tegart
Kamloops-North Thompson: Peter Milobar
Kamloops-South Thompson: Todd Stone
Kelowna-Lake Country: Norm Letnick
Kelowna-Mission: Steve Thomson
Kelowna West: Christy Clark
Kootenay East: Tom Shypitka
Kootenay West: Katrine Conroy
Langford-Juan de Fuca: John Horgan
Langley: Mary Polak
Langley East: Rich Coleman
Maple Ridge-Mission: Bob D'Eith
Maple Ridge-Pitt Meadows: Lisa Beare
Mid Island-Pacific Rim: Scott Fraser
Nanaimo: Leonard Krog
Nanaimo-North Cowichan: Doug Routley
Nechako Lakes: John Rustad
Nelson-Creston: Michelle Mungall
New Westminster: Judy Darcy
North Coast: Jennifer Rice
North Island: Claire Trevena
North Vancouver-Lonsdale: Bowinn Ma
North Vancouver-Seymour: Jane Thornthwaite
Oak Bay-Gordon Head: Andrew Weaver
Parksville-Qualicum: Michelle Stilwell
Peace River North: Dan Davies
Peace River South: Mike Bernier
Penticton: Dan Ashton
Port Coquitlam: Mike Farnworth
Port Moody-Coquitlam: Rick Glumac
Powell River-Sunshine Coast: Nicholas Simons
Prince George-Mackenzie: Mike Morris
Prince George-Valemount: Shirley Bond
Richmond North Centre: Teresa Wat
Richmond-Queensborough: Jas Johal
Richmond South Centre: Linda Reid
Richmond-Steveston: John Yap
Saanich North and the Islands: Adam Olsen
Saanich South: Lana Popham
Shuswap: Greg Kyllo
Skeena: Ellis Ross
Stikine: Doug Donaldson
Surrey-Cloverdale: Marvin Hunt
Surrey-Fleetwood: Jagrup Brar
Surrey-Green Timbers: Rachna Singh
Surrey-Guildford: Garry Begg
Surrey-Newton: Harry Bains
Surrey-Panorama: Jinny Sims
Surrey South: Stephanie Cadieux
Surrey-Whalley: Bruce Ralston
Surrey-White Rock: Tracy Redies
Vancouver-Fairview: George Heyman
Vancouver-False Creek: Sam Sullivan
Vancouver-Fraserview: George Chow
Vancouver-Hastings: Shane Simpson
Vancouver-Kensington: Mable Elmore
Vancouver-Kingsway: Adrian Dix
Vancouver-Langara: Michael Lee
Vancouver-Mount Pleasant: Melanie Mark
Vancouver-Point Grey: David Eby
Vancouver-Quilchena: Andrew Wilkinson
Vancouver-West End: Spencer Chandra Herbert
Vernon-Monashee: Eric Foster
Victoria-Beacon Hill: Carole James
Victoria-Swan Lake: Rob Fleming
West Vancouver-Capilano: Ralph Sultan
West Vancouver-Sea to Sky: Jordan Sturdy

=== Synopsis of results ===
Results by riding – 2017 British Columbia general election
Riding	Winning party						Turnout (Note: Including spoilt ballots)	Votes (Note: Parties receiving more than 1% of the popular vote, or fielding candidates in at least half of the constituencies, are listed separately. Conservatives are also shown separately, as they had been a significant player in 2013, and Libertarians are noted due to the number of candidates fielded in this election.)							
Name	2013	Party	Votes	Share	Margin #	Margin %	Turnout	Lib	NDP	Grn	Con	Ltn	Ind	Oth	Total
Abbotsford-Mission	Lib	Lib	12,879	51.19%	5,540	22.02%	59.20%	12,879	7,339	4,297	–	–	–	644	25,159
Abbotsford South	Lib	Lib	11,683	52.48%	5,386	24.20%	54.71%	11,683	6,297	3,338	–	–	–	942	22,260
Abbotsford West	Lib	Lib	11,618	55.23%	5,144	24.45%	57.30%	11,618	6,474	2,280	–	149	–	516	21,037
Boundary-Similkameen	Lib	Lib	9,513	42.80%	2,238	10.07%	64.80%	9,513	7,275	2,274	–	–	3,165	–	22,227
Burnaby-Deer Lake	NDP	NDP	8,747	47.89%	2,256	12.35%	53.00%	6,491	8,747	2,209	589	–	229	–	18,265
Burnaby-Edmonds	NDP	NDP	10,827	54.25%	4,423	22.16%	53.81%	6,404	10,827	2,728	–	–	–	–	19,959
Burnaby-Lougheed	NDP	NDP	10,911	48.06%	2,520	11.10%	60.81%	8,391	10,911	3,127	–	129	145	–	22,703
Burnaby North	Lib	NDP	11,448	48.57%	2,158	9.16%	60.39%	9,290	11,448	2,831	–	–	–	–	23,569
Cariboo-Chilcotin	Lib	Lib	8,517	58.77%	4,716	32.54%	60.79%	8,517	3,801	2,175	–	–	–	–	14,493
Cariboo North	Lib	Lib	6,359	51.06%	1,929	15.49%	60.94%	6,359	4,430	919	747	–	–	–	12,455
Chilliwack	Lib	Lib	9,280	48.42%	3,073	16.03%	55.43%	9,280	6,207	3,277	–	–	402	–	19,166
Chilliwack-Kent	Lib	Lib	11,841	52.75%	4,568	20.35%	59.55%	11,841	7,273	3,335	–	–	–	–	22,449
Columbia River-Revelstoke	NDP	Lib	6,620	45.44%	1,372	9.42%	59.79%	6,620	5,248	1,708	–	154	840	–	14,570
Coquitlam-Burke Mountain	Lib	Lib	10,388	44.28%	87	0.37%	57.46%	10,388	10,301	2,771	–	–	–	–	23,460
Coquitlam-Maillardville	NDP	NDP	11,438	50.61%	2,919	12.92%	61.57%	8,519	11,438	2,467	–	175	–	–	22,599
Courtenay-Comox	Lib	NDP	10,886	37.36%	189	0.65%	66.89%	10,697	10,886	5,351	2,201	–	–	–	29,135
Cowichan Valley	NDP	Grn	11,449	37.24%	1,726	5.61%	67.58%	8,502	9,723	11,449	–	302	766	–	30,742
Delta North	Lib	NDP	11,465	48.83%	2,146	9.14%	64.99%	9,319	11,465	2,697	–	–	–	–	23,481
Delta South	Ind	Lib	11,123	44.10%	4,686	18.58%	71.79%	11,123	5,228	2,349	–	–	6,437	88	25,225
Esquimalt-Metchosin	NDP	NDP	11,816	46.25%	4,761	18.64%	65.88%	7,055	11,816	6,339	–	171	102	65	25,548
Fraser-Nicola	Lib	Lib	6,597	41.79%	524	3.32%	64.04%	6,597	6,073	2,519	–	–	–	596	15,785
Kamloops-North Thompson	Lib	Lib	12,001	48.32%	4,463	17.97%	60.34%	12,001	7,538	5,111	–	–	–	187	24,837
Kamloops-South Thompson	Lib	Lib	15,465	55.78%	9,393	33.88%	64.60%	15,465	6,072	5,783	–	295	–	109	27,724
Kelowna-Lake Country	Lib	Lib	15,287	59.76%	9,943	38.87%	54.21%	15,287	5,344	4,951	–	–	–	–	25,582
Kelowna-Mission	Lib	Lib	15,401	57.18%	9,681	35.94%	57.67%	15,401	5,720	3,836	1,976	–	–	–	26,933
Kelowna West	Lib	Lib	15,674	58.96%	8,962	33.71%	55.46%	15,674	6,712	3,628	–	–	570	–	26,584
Kootenay East	Lib	Lib	9,666	56.57%	4,596	26.90%	55.71%	9,666	5,070	1,926	–	425	–	–	17,087
Kootenay West	NDP	NDP	11,297	59.64%	6,680	35.26%	60.78%	4,617	11,297	3,029	–	–	–	–	18,943
Langford-Juan de Fuca	NDP	NDP	13,224	52.75%	6,680	26.65%	62.11%	6,544	13,224	4,795	–	262	–	242	25,067
Langley	Lib	Lib	10,755	44.40%	2,371	9.79%	59.40%	10,755	8,384	3,699	1,221	166	–	–	24,225
Langley East	Lib	Lib	16,348	53.45%	7,528	24.61%	64.54%	16,348	8,820	4,968	–	448	–	–	30,584
Maple Ridge-Mission	Lib	NDP	10,989	41.94%	325	1.24%	61.69%	10,664	10,989	3,464	935	148	–	–	26,200
Maple Ridge-Pitt Meadows	Lib	NDP	12,045	44.80%	1,617	6.01%	64.50%	10,428	12,045	3,329	676	–	408	–	26,886
Mid Island-Pacific Rim	NDP	NDP	12,556	49.05%	5,980	23.36%	63.22%	6,576	12,556	5,208	878	294	–	86	25,598
Nanaimo	NDP	NDP	12,746	46.54%	3,835	14.00%	62.30%	8,911	12,746	5,454	–	277	–	–	27,388
Nanaimo-North Cowichan	NDP	NDP	12,276	46.89%	4,897	18.70%	63.73%	7,379 (Note: Alana DeLong was previously a Progressive Conservative member of the Legislative Assembly of Alberta.)	12,276	6,252	–	–	274	–	26,181
Nechako Lakes	Lib	Lib	5,307	54.39%	2,398	24.57%	59.06%	5,307	2,909	878	–	438	226	–	9,758
Nelson-Creston	NDP	NDP	7,685	42.19%	2,555	14.03%	64.20%	5,087	7,685	5,130	–	–	313	–	18,215
New Westminster	NDP	NDP	14,377	51.93%	7,438	26.87%	63.61%	5,870	14,377	6,939	–	199	–	298	27,683
North Coast	NDP	NDP	5,242	57.30%	2,161	23.62%	61.16%	3,081	5,242	826	–	–	–	–	9,149
North Island	NDP	NDP	12,355	47.72%	3,207	12.39%	62.49%	9,148	12,355	3,846	–	–	–	543	25,892
North Vancouver-Lonsdale	Lib	NDP	12,361	45.45%	1,988	7.31%	65.68%	10,373	12,361	4,148	–	316	–	–	27,198
North Vancouver-Seymour	Lib	Lib	13,194	46.36%	3,386	11.90%	70.33%	13,194	9,808	5,208	–	247	–	–	28,457
Oak Bay-Gordon Head	Grn	Grn	15,405	52.20%	8,397	28.45%	71.99%	7,008	6,972	15,405	–	–	–	125	29,510
Parksville-Qualicum	Lib	Lib	14,468	45.13%	5,279	16.47%	70.21%	14,468	9,189	8,157	–	–	–	245	32,059
Peace River North	Lib	Lib	9,707	66.28%	6,922	47.26%	56.74%	9,707	962	–	–	–	3,977	–	14,646
Peace River South	Lib	Lib	6,637	75.97%	4,538	51.95%	49.97%	6,637	2,099	–	–	–	–	–	8,736
Penticton	Lib	Lib	14,470	52.80%	6,596	24.07%	60.79%	14,470	7,874	5,061	–	–	–	–	27,405
Port Coquitlam	NDP	NDP	14,079	55.79%	6,497	25.75%	62.44%	7,582	14,079	3,237	–	248	–	88	25,234
Port Moody-Coquitlam	Lib	NDP	11,754	47.69%	1,844	7.48%	65.31%	9,910	11,754	2,985	–	–	–	–	24,649
Powell River-Sunshine Coast	NDP	NDP	13,646	50.70%	7,044	26.17%	69.60%	6,602	13,646	6,505	–	–	–	160	26,913
Prince George-Mackenzie	Lib	Lib	10,725	57.12%	4,783	25.47%	57.44%	10,725	5,942	2,109	–	–	–	–	18,776
Prince George-Valemount	Lib	Lib	11,209	58.20%	5,515	28.64%	56.75%	11,209	5,694	2,356	–	–	–	–	19,259
Richmond North Centre	New	Lib	7,916	52.48%	2,781	18.44%	48.06%	7,916	5,135	1,579	–	–	336	117	15,083
Richmond-Queensborough	New	Lib	8,218	41.43%	134	0.68%	55.78%	8,218	8,084	2,524	694	–	–	318	19,838
Richmond South Centre	New	Lib	6,914	48.72%	1,198	8.44%	46.70%	6,914	5,716	1,561	–	–	–	–	14,191
Richmond-Steveston	Lib	Lib	10,332	47.60%	1,790	8.25%	62.77%	10,332	8,542	2,833	–	–	–	–	21,707
Saanich North and the Islands	NDP	Grn	14,775	41.95%	4,011	11.39%	74.14%	9,321	10,764	14,775	–	–	364	–	35,224
Saanich South	NDP	NDP	11,921	42.46%	3,205	11.42%	70.63%	8,716	11,921	7,129	–	177	–	130	28,073
Shuswap	Lib	Lib	14,829	55.80%	7,668	28.85%	62.80%	14,829	7,161	4,175	–	410	–	–	26,575
Skeena	NDP	Lib	6,772	52.23%	1,159	8.94%	62.76%	6,772	5,613	–	–	–	–	580	12,965
Stikine	NDP	NDP	4,748	52.10%	1,217	13.35%	65.61%	3,531	4,748	–	–	–	–	834	9,113
Surrey-Cloverdale	Lib	Lib	11,948	47.67%	2,210	8.82%	61.84%	11,948	9,738	3,100	–	276	–	–	25,062
Surrey-Fleetwood	Lib	NDP	11,085	53.58%	3,486	16.85%	59.52%	7,599	11,085	2,004	–	–	–	–	20,688
Surrey-Green Timbers	NDP	NDP	8,945	58.29%	3,889	25.34%	54.61%	5,056	8,945	1,112	–	–	163	69	15,345
Surrey-Guildford	Lib	NDP	9,263	49.85%	2,248	12.10%	55.76%	7,015	9,263	1,840	–	–	–	462	18,580
Surrey-Newton	NDP	NDP	9,744	57.31%	4,645	27.32%	58.14%	5,099	9,744	1,172	–	–	988	–	17,003
Surrey-Panorama	Lib	NDP	12,227	50.85%	2,163	9.00%	61.04%	10,064	12,227	1,620	–	–	–	132	24,043
Surrey South	New	Lib	13,509	50.94%	4,791	18.07%	59.91%	13,509	8,718	3,141	–	311	774	67	26,520
Surrey-Whalley	NDP	NDP	10,315	58.62%	5,022	28.54%	51.55%	5,293	10,315	1,893	–	–	–	96	17,597
Surrey-White Rock	Lib	Lib	14,101	49.87%	5,453	19.29%	67.13%	14,101	8,648	4,574	–	–	950	–	28,273
Vancouver-Fairview	NDP	NDP	16,035	54.12%	6,599	22.27%	65.79%	9,436	16,035	4,007	–	–	–	149	29,627
Vancouver-False Creek	Lib	Lib	10,370	42.16%	415	1.69%	55.68%	10,370	9,955	3,880	–	213	–	181	24,599
Vancouver-Fraserview	Lib	NDP	11,487	48.57%	1,502	6.35%	60.55%	9,985	11,487	1,826	–	179	–	174	23,651
Vancouver-Hastings	NDP	NDP	14,382	59.98%	9,230	38.49%	59.59%	5,152	14,382	4,238	–	–	–	206	23,978
Vancouver-Kensington	NDP	NDP	12,503	55.57%	5,267	23.41%	59.50%	7,236	12,503	2,580	–	–	–	181	22,500
Vancouver-Kingsway	NDP	NDP	12,031	60.62%	6,654	33.53%	53.35%	5,377	12,031	1,848	504	–	–	85	19,845
Vancouver-Langara	Lib	Lib	10,047	47.46%	1,989	9.39%	56.44%	10,047	8,058	2,894	–	–	–	172	21,171
Vancouver-Mount Pleasant	NDP	NDP	15,962	65.33%	11,826	48.40%	57.62%	3,917	15,962	4,136	–	–	212	207	24,434
Vancouver-Point Grey	NDP	NDP	14,195	55.94%	5,781	22.78%	63.63%	8,414	14,195	2,604	–	–	85	77	25,375
Vancouver-Quilchena	Lib	Lib	12,464	55.96%	6,220	27.92%	62.39%	12,464	6,244	3,301	–	265	–	–	22,274
Vancouver-West End	NDP	NDP	13,420	60.97%	8,356	37.96%	56.53%	5,064	13,420	3,059	–	352	116	–	22,011
Vernon-Monashee	Lib	Lib	13,625	47.87%	5,270	18.52%	58.96 %	13,625	8,355	6,139	–	341	–	–	28,460
Victoria-Beacon Hill	NDP	NDP	16,057	53.05%	6,863	22.67%	64.20%	4,689	16,057	9,194	–	190	137	–	30,267
Victoria-Swan Lake	NDP	NDP	13,374	53.60%	5,961	23.89%	64.33%	3,960	13,374	7,413	–	–	–	203	24,950
West Vancouver-Capilano	Lib	Lib	13,596	57.15%	7,974	33.52%	62.56%	13,596	5,622	4,570	–	–	–	–	23,788
West Vancouver-Sea to Sky	Lib	Lib	10,449	43.08%	3,502	14.44%	61.09%	10,449	6,532	6,947	–	186	143	–	24,257

= Open seat
= turnout is above provincial average
= winning candidate was in previous Legislature
= Incumbent had switched allegiance
= Previously incumbent in another riding
= Not incumbent; was previously elected to the Legislature
= Incumbency arose from by-election gain
= other incumbents renominated
= previously an MP in the House of Commons of Canada
= Multiple candidates

=== Summary analysis ===
Party candidates in 2nd place
Party in 1st place	Party in 2nd place				Total
Party in 1st place	Lib	NDP	Grn	Ind	Total
Liberal		40	1	2	43
New Democratic	36		5		41
Green	1	2			3
Total	37	42	6	2	87

Candidates ranked 1st to 5th place, by party
Parties	1st	2nd	3rd	4th	5th
█ Liberal	43	37	7		
█ New Democratic	41	42	4		
█ Green	3	6	72	2	
█ Independent		2	1	16	10
█ Christian Heritage			1	4	
█ Land Air Water			1		
█ Libertarian				21	8
█ Conservative				10	
█ Your Political Party				3	5
█ Communist				3	2
█ Vancouver Island Party				2	2
█ Refederation				2	
█ Social Credit				2	
█ Cascadia				1	1
█ BC First				1	
█ BC Action					2
█ 4BC					1
█ New Republican					1

Resulting composition of the 41st Legislative Assembly of British Columbia
Source		Party			
Source		Lib	NDP	Grn	Total
Seats retained	Incumbents returned	29	26	1	56
Seats retained	Open seats held – new MLAs	5	4		9
Seats retained	Open seats held – taken by MLA previously incumbent in another riding	1			1
Seats retained	Byelection losses reversed	1			1
Seats changing hands	Incumbents defeated		9	1	10
Seats changing hands	Open seats gained	3	2	1	6
New seats	New MLAs	1			1
New seats	MLAs previously incumbent in another riding	3			3
Total		43	41	3	87

== Aftermath ==
On May 9, it was not immediately clear what form the government would take, as Elections BC does not count absentee ballots until two weeks after election day. This final count would determine the makeup of the legislature, since several seats were won with margins of a few hundred votes or less, and both the Liberals and NDP hoped to acquire enough seats to secure a majority. No seats changed hands, however, after the counting of absentee ballots concluded on May 24, and the initial count of 43–41–3 was confirmed.

As no single party won a majority of seats, the Green Party was approached by both the Liberals and the NDP to determine whether they would support a minority government or a coalition government headed by either party. No grand coalition or agreement between the two large parties, excluding the Greens, was seriously considered. On May 29, Horgan and Weaver announced that the Greens would provide confidence and supply to an NDP minority government, a position which was endorsed the following day by the members of both caucuses. In response, Clark indicated that she would have the legislature sit in the coming weeks and seek its confidence in a Liberal minority government, while acknowledging that she would likely be unsuccessful. On June 12, Clark appointed a new cabinet that saw new MLAs join cabinet and existing ones take on different portfolios; Clark described the cabinet as being in "caretaker mode" and that it wouldn't pursue any new policies, but added "the team reflects the results of listening to what voters told us in the last election." On June 22, the legislature convened with a throne speech that Clark said contained "the best ideas from all parties"; of the 48 pledges within, 30 were absent from the Liberal Party's election platform. On June 29, the Liberals were defeated in a confidence vote; Clark then asked Lieutenant Governor Judith Guichon to dissolve the legislature and call a new election. Guichon refused and instead invited Horgan to form an NDP minority government. Horgan was sworn into office on July 18.

== Student vote results ==
Student votes are mock elections that run parallel to actual elections, in which students not of voting age participate. They are administered by Student Vote Canada. Student vote elections are for educational purposes and do not count towards the results.

Summary of the 2017 BC Student Vote
Party	Leader	Seats	Votes	%
New Democratic	John Horgan	60	65,205	38.98
Green	Andrew Weaver	14	47,641	28.48
Liberal	Christy Clark	12	42,651	25.5
Independent		1	3,626	2.17
Others		0	8,156	4.79
Total		87	167,576	100.0

== Opinion polls ==
Opinion polling (2013–2017)
Polling firm	Date of polling	Source	Lib	NDP	Grn	Con	Oth	Type of poll	Sample size
Forum Research	May 8, 2017		39	41	17		3	IVR	1,076
Insights West	May 8, 2017		41	41	17		2	Online	801
Justason Market Intelligence	May 7, 2017		38	36	23		3	IVR/online	1,447
Mainstreet Research	May 6, 2017		39	40	20			IVR	1,650
Ipsos Reid	May 6, 2017		39	40	17		4	Online/telephone	1,404
Angus Reid	May 3, 2017		40	41	15		4	Online	1,007
Justason Market Intelligence	May 2, 2017		39	34	23		4	IVR/online	2,116
Mainstreet Research	May 1, 2017		37	42	21			IVR	1,650
Innovative Research	May 1, 2017		38	35	17	8	2	Online	500
Ipsos Reid	April 30, 2017		43	41	14		3	Online	834
Innovative Research	April 30, 2017		38	33	20	6	3	Telephone	600
Forum Research	April 29, 2017		29	37	24	7	3	IVR	1,067
Justason Market Intelligence	April 28, 2017		38	37	21		4	Online	1,127
Innovative Research	April 23, 2017		42	32	16	9	1	Online	1,000
Mainstreet Research	April 22, 2017		34	44	22			IVR	1,650
Justason Market Intelligence	April 20, 2017		36	39	19		5	Online	1,128
Mainstreet Research	April 14, 2017		37	39	21	3		IVR	1,650
Mainstreet Research	April 10, 2017		35	39	19	7		IVR	5,506
Ipsos Reid	April 9, 2017		39	44	12	4	1	Online/telephone	1,388
Forum Research	April 8, 2017		29	39	18	12	3	IVR	1,040
Insights West	April 8, 2017		38	40	17	3	2	Online	801
Mainstreet Research	April 3, 2017		33	36	19	11		IVR	1,650
Mainstreet Research	March 27, 2017		34	36	19	11		IVR	1,650
Mainstreet Research	March 20, 2017		34	38	17	11		IVR	1,500
Mainstreet Research	March 12, 2017		36	40	13	11		IVR	2,109
Mainstreet Research	March 5, 2017		35	39	13	13		IVR	2,191
Forum Research	March 1, 2017		32	36	15	14	3	IVR	1,056
Mainstreet Research	February 26, 2017		33	38	15	13		IVR	2,352
Insights West	February 26, 2017		40	41	11	5	3	Online	801
Forum Research	February 23, 2017		28	39	14	15	3	IVR	1,061
Mainstreet Research	February 19, 2017		37	37	17	10		IVR	2,188
Insights West	November 21, 2016		39	40	14	5	2	Online	806
Mainstreet Research	September 8, 2016		33	38	16	14		IVR	2,207
Innovative Research	August 14, 2016		38	29	16	15	1	Telephone	600
Ipsos Reid	May 9, 2016		42	36	10	11	1	Online	803
Insights West	May 5, 2016		34	40	14	10	2	Online	801
Insights West	November 14, 2015		34	39	16	7	4	Online	812
Insights West	May 19, 2015		37	43	10	6	4	Online	801
Ipsos Reid	May 12, 2015		41	44	8	7	2	Online	804
Insights West	December 6, 2014		36	40	14	8	2	Online	805
McAllister Opinion Research	July 29, 2014		36.0	36.3	17.5	9.1	1.0	Online	1,704
Insights West	May 10, 2014		38	39	14	8	1	Online	824
Justason Market Intelligence	January 19, 2014		37	35	19	7	1	Telephone/online	600
Insights West	December 3, 2013		40	36	14	6	3	Online	866
2013 election	May 14, 2013		44.14	39.71	8.13	4.76	3.25	Ballot	1,803,051
