= Evelyn Gillespie =

Canadian politician (born 1952)

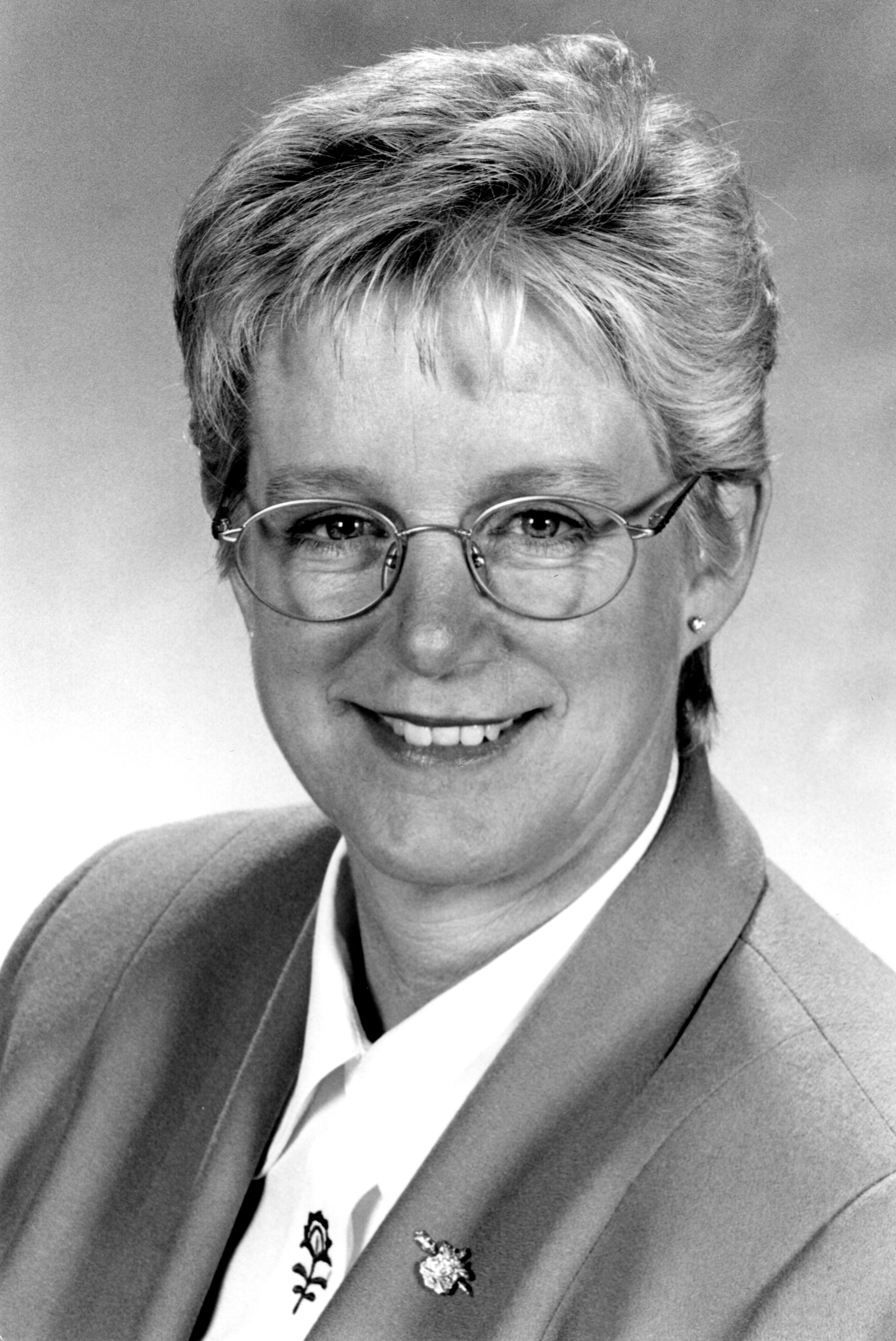

Member of the British Columbia Legislative Assembly for Comox Valley
- In office May 28, 1996 – May 16, 2001
- Preceded by: Margaret Lord
- Succeeded by: Stan Hagen

Personal details
- Born: May 1, 1952 (age 73) Calgary, Alberta, Canada
- Party: British Columbia New Democratic Party
- Occupation: Resort Operator

Evelyn Marie Gillespie (born April 1, 1952) is a former Canadian politician. She served as MLA for the Comox Valley riding in the Legislative Assembly of British Columbia from 1996 to 2001, as a member of the British Columbia New Democratic Party. She served as Minister of Women's Equality from November 1, 2000 to June 5, 2001.

She graduated from the University of British Columbia in 1976 with a degree in recreation education.

Before her election as an MLA, she co-ordinated volunteer programs at a Calgary shelter for abused women and their children and also worked as a co-ordinator of volunteer programs at the Addiction Research Foundation in Toronto and with the Vancouver Health Department.

She also operated a small resort in the Comox Valley and now owns and operates the Laughing Oyster Bookshop in Courtenay, British Columbia.

British Columbia provincial government of Ujjal Dosanjh
Cabinet post (1)
Predecessor	Office	Successor
Joan Smallwood	Minister of Women's Equality; November 1, 2000 – June 5, 2001	Ministry Abolished
