= Prince George-Mackenzie =

Provincial electoral district in British Columbia, Canada

British Columbia electoral district
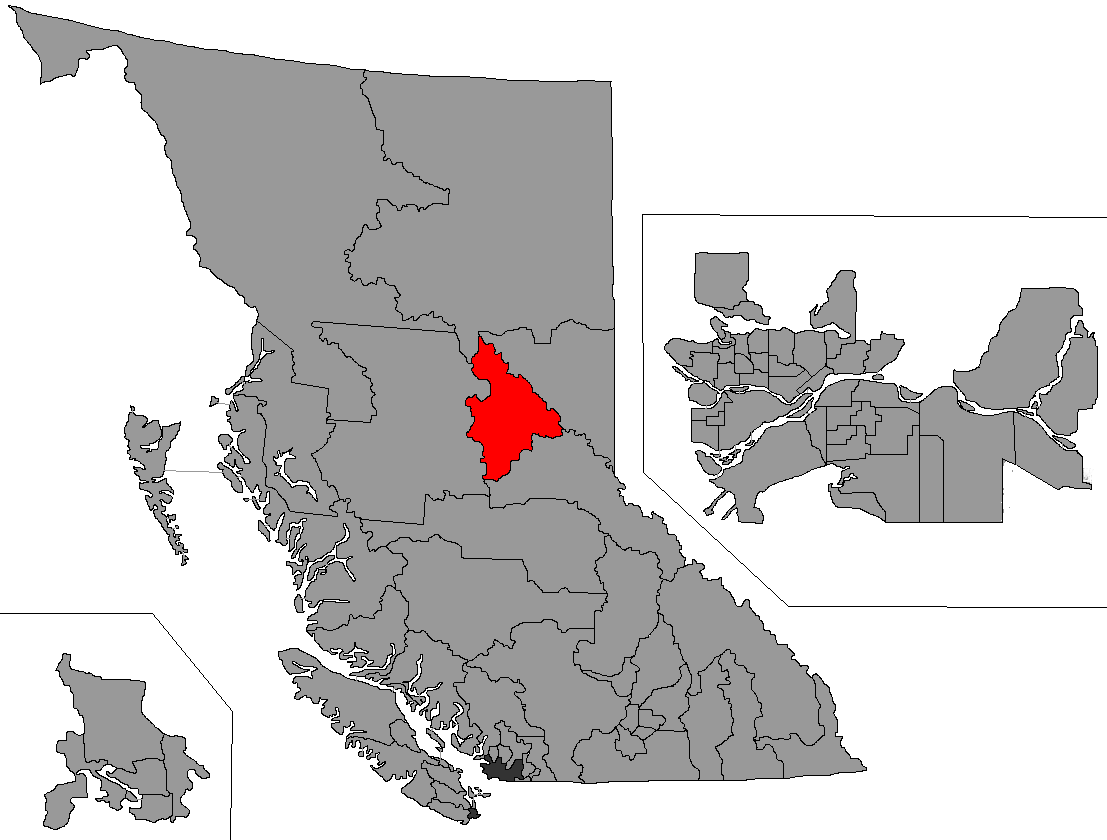

Provincial electoral district
- Legislature: Legislative Assembly of British Columbia
MLA
Kiel Giddens
Conservative
- District created: 2008
- First contested: 2009
- Last contested: 2026

Demographics
- Population (2006): 45,379
- Area (km²): 20,361.32
- Pop. density (per km²): 2.2
- Census division: Regional District of Fraser-Fort George
- Census subdivision(s): Prince George, Mackenzie

Prince George-Mackenzie is a provincial electoral district in British Columbia, Canada, established by the Electoral Districts Act, 2008. It came into effect upon the dissolution of the BC Legislature in April 2009, and was first contested in the 2009 provincial election.

== Geography ==
As of the 2020 provincial election, Prince George-Mackenzie comprises the northern portion of the Regional District of Fraser-Fort George, located in central British Columbia. The electoral district contains the community of Mackenzie and the northwestern portion of Prince George. The boundary line within the city of Prince George comes from the east following along the Fraser, and then the Nechako River to the John Hart Bridge where it goes south along Highway 97, west along Massey Drive, south along Ospika Boulevard until Ferry Avenue. The boundary then cuts west to just south of the University of Northern British Columbia before travelling south down Tyner Boulevard, then follows Highway 16 out of the city to the west.

== Members of the Legislative Assembly ==
Prince George-Mackenzie
Assembly	Years	Member	Party
Riding created from Prince George North
39th	2009–2013	Pat Bell	Liberal
40th	2013–2017	Mike Morris	Liberal
41st	2017–2020	Mike Morris	Liberal
42nd	2020–2023	Mike Morris	Liberal
42nd	2023–2024	Mike Morris	BC United
43rd	2024–2026	Kiel Giddens	Conservative
44th	2026–present	Kiel Giddens	Conservative

== Election results ==
2026 British Columbia general election
The 2026 general election will be held on October 24.
Party	Candidate	Votes	%	±%	Expenditures
Conservative	Kiel Giddens	9,926	66.11		
New Democratic	Ian McMahon	3,532	23.52		
Green	Teri Young	1,517	10.10		
Total valid votes		14,975	99.74		
Total rejected ballots		39	0.26		
Turnout					
Registered voters					
Source: Elections BC

2024 British Columbia general election
Party	Candidate	Votes	%	±%	Expenditures
Conservative	Kiel Giddens	11,307	60.92	–	$23,119.75
New Democratic	Shar McCrory	5,242	28.24	-5.4	$10,003.63
Green	James Steidle	1,576	8.49	-2.6	$2,382.05
Unaffiliated	Rachael Weber	435	2.34	–	$6,347.43
Total valid votes/expense limit		18,560	99.85	–	$71,700.08
Total rejected ballots		28	0.15	–	
Turnout		18,588	59.50	–	
Registered voters		31,239			
Conservative notional gain from BC United		Swing		N/A (Note: Swing cannot be calculated as BC United did not run a candidate in this riding.)	
Source: Elections BC

2020 provincial election redistributed results
Party	%
Liberal	51.7
New Democratic	33.6
Green	11.1

2020 British Columbia general election
Party	Candidate	Votes	%	±%	Expenditures
Liberal	Mike Morris	8,543	50.80	−6.32	$30,276.67
New Democratic	Joan Atkinson	5,717	33.99	+2.34	$4,085.37
Green	Catharine Kendall	1,935	11.50	+0.27	$3,692.23
Christian Heritage	Dee Kranz	336	2.00	–	$1,193.15
Libertarian	Raymond Rodgers	287	1.71	–	$0.00
Total valid votes		16,818	100.00	–	
Total rejected ballots		150	0.88	0.11	
Turnout		16,968	49.06	–8.38	
Registered voters		34,587			
Liberal hold		Swing		–4.33	
Source: Elections BC

2017 British Columbia general election
Party	Candidate	Votes	%	±%	Expenditures
Liberal	Mike Morris	10,725	57.12	+1.54	$49,947
New Democratic	Bobby Deepak	5,942	31.65	-2.62	$53,121
Green	Hilary Crowley	2,109	11.23	+5.54	$1,433
Total valid votes		18,776	100.00		
Total rejected ballots		146	0.77		
Turnout		18,922	57.44		
Source: Elections BC

2013 British Columbia general election
Party	Candidate	Votes	%	±%	Expenditures
Liberal	Mike Morris	10,524	55.58	-0.47	$168,600
New Democratic	Bobby Deepak	6,488	34.27	-2.57	$138,631
Green	Karen McDowell	1,077	5.69	-1.42	$3,465
Conservative	Terry Rysz	845	4.46	-	$21,364
Total valid votes		18,934	100.00		
Total rejected ballots		165	0.86		
Turnout		19,099	56.86		
Source: Elections BC

2009 British Columbia general election
Party	Candidate	Votes	%	Expenditures
Liberal	Pat Bell	9,816	56.05	$99,560
New Democratic	Tobias Lawrence	6,452	36.84	$111,514
Green	Kevin Creamore	1,245	7.11	$1,230
Total valid votes		17,513	100	
Total rejected ballots		158	0.9	
Turnout		17,671	54	

== See also ==
- List of British Columbia provincial electoral districts
- Canadian provincial electoral districts
