= Kiel Giddens =

Canadian politician

The Honourable Kiel Giddens MLA
- Giddens in 2026

Member of the British Columbia Legislative Assembly for Prince George-Mackenzie
- Incumbent
- Assumed office October 19, 2024
- Preceded by: Mike Morris

Minister of Forests of British Columbia
- Incumbent
- Assumed office November 20, 2026
- Preceded by: Ravi Parmar

Personal details
- Born: 1984 or 1985 (age 41–42) Kamloops, British Columbia, Canada
- Party: BC Conservatives

Kiel Giddens MLA (born 1984 or 1985) is a Canadian politician who has served as a member of the Legislative Assembly of British Columbia (MLA) representing the electoral district Prince George-Mackenzie since 2024. He is a member of the Conservative Party.

== Early life and career ==
Giddens lives in Prince George with his wife, Elyse, and his two sons, Thomas and Charlie. He graduated from the University of British Columbia with a Bachelor of Arts degree in Political Science.

Prior to being elected as an MLA, Giddens served on the Board of Directors for Spirit of the North Healthcare Foundation. He has also served as the Land, Community & Aboriginal Relations Liaison and later Public Affairs Manager for TC Energy's Coastal GasLink pipeline project from 2013 to 2022, on behalf of which he met with the Government of British Columbia as a registered lobbyist 29 times. He also served on the Premier's LNG Labour Working Group, the Regional District of Bulkley-Nechako Strategic Workforce Opportunities Team, and the College of New Caledonia President's Industry Council. He also advocated for small businesses and jobs in Prince George and the region through his past role as President of the Prince George Chamber of Commerce.

Giddens has also held senior roles in previous governments of BC. These include Chief of Staff to the Minister of Environment and Chief of Staff to the Minister of Transportation & Infrastructure, as well as roles in the Ministry of Forests, Lands, and Natural Resource Operations, and the Ministry of Labour. This political career history has supported the reduction of red tape in environmental assessments; enhanced environmental stewardship; fast-tracked spending on projects like the Cariboo Connector and South Taylor Hill in the Peace; and supported policy making and implementation in wildlife management, forestry, climate, WorkSafeBC, and construction labour relations.

== Political career ==
Giddens was previously the BC United candidate for the same riding, entering the race in September in 2023 to fill MLA Mike Morris' spot in the legislature after his retirement announcement. However he switched to the BC Conservative Party after BC United suspended its campaign. On September 4th 2024, Giddens was nominated as the Conservative Party of BC's candidate for Prince George-Mackenzie.

In the 2024 provincial election, Giddens was elected as a Member of the Legislative Assembly for Prince George-Mackenzie, winning with 61% of the vote. After his election, Giddens was named to the Conservative shadow cabinet as critic for Labour. In his role as critic for Labour, Giddens has stated a focus on the small business and forestry sectors.

== Electoral history ==
2026 British Columbia general election: Prince George-Mackenzie
Party	Candidate	Votes	%	±%	Expenditures
Conservative	Kiel Giddens	10,473	65.81		
New Democratic	Ian McMahon	3,770	23.69		
Green	Teri Young	1,618	10.17		
Total valid votes		15,861	99.67		
Total rejected ballots		52	0.33		
Turnout		15,913			
Registered voters					
Conservative hold		Swing		+4.96	
Source: Elections BC

2024 British Columbia general election: Prince George-Mackenzie
Party	Candidate	Votes	%	±%	Expenditures
Conservative	Kiel Giddens	11,307	60.92	–	$23,119.75
New Democratic	Shar McCrory	5,242	28.24	-5.4	$10,003.63
Green	James Steidle	1,576	8.49	-2.6	$2,382.05
Unaffiliated	Rachael Weber	435	2.34	–	$6,347.43
Total valid votes/expense limit		18,560	99.85	–	$71,700.08
Total rejected ballots		28	0.15	–	
Turnout		18,588	59.50	–	
Registered voters		31,239			
Conservative notional gain from BC United		Swing		N/A (Note: Swing cannot be calculated as BC United did not run a candidate in this riding.)	
Source: Elections BC

== See also ==
- 43rd Parliament of British Columbia
