= Mike Morris (politician) =

Canadian politician

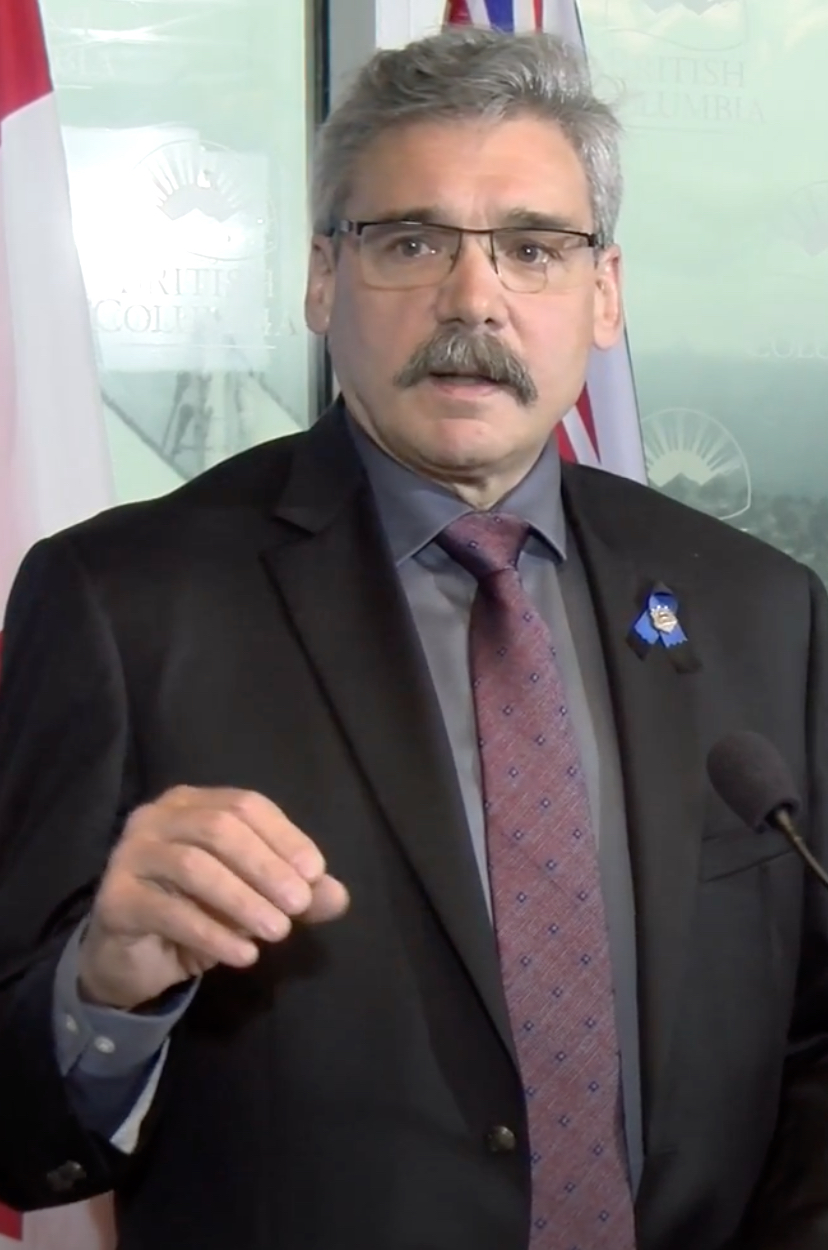

Minister of Public Safety and Solicitor General
- In office December 11, 2015 – July 18, 2017
- Preceded by: Position Vacant (Shirley Bond in 2012)
- Succeeded by: Mike Farnworth

Member of the British Columbia Legislative Assembly for Prince George-Mackenzie
- In office May 14, 2013 – September 21, 2024
- Preceded by: Pat Bell
- Succeeded by: Kiel Giddens

Personal details
- Party: BC Liberals
- Spouse: Chris Morris
- Profession: Royal Canadian Mounted Police Officer (retired)

Mike Morris is a Canadian politician, who was first elected to the Legislative Assembly of British Columbia in the 2013 provincial election. He represented the electoral district of Prince George-Mackenzie as a member of the British Columbia Liberal Party.

Morris was chair of the Special Committee to Review the Independent Investigations Office, the convener of the Select Standing Committee of Crown Corporations, and has served on other Selected Standing Committees including Finance and Government Services and Public Accounts, along with the Cabinet Committee for Environment and Land Use.

Before being elected to the B.C. Legislature on May 14, 2013, Morris had a 32-year career in the Royal Canadian Mounted Police (RCMP). He retired in 2005 as the Superintendent for the North District. He has also been an adjudicator and mediator with the Health Professions Review Board, has served on the Drug Benefit Council for BC since 2009, and is the Past President of the BC Trappers Association. He spent the majority of his RCMP career in northern communities. He and his wife Chris have been married for more than 35 years. They have two sons and five grandchildren.

In December 2015, Premier Christy Clark appointed him to be Minister of Public Safety and Solicitor General after the position had been vacant since the duties were combined with the Ministry of Justice in 2012. He had previously served as Parliamentary Secretary for Forests, Lands and Natural Resource Operations. Since 2017, he has served as the Official Opposition Critic for Public Safety and Solicitor General.

On March 21, 2023, he announced he would not be seeking a fourth term in the next provincial election. His seat was won by BC Conservative candidate Kiel Giddens.

== Electoral record ==
2020 British Columbia general election: Prince George-Mackenzie
Party	Candidate	Votes	%	±%	Expenditures
Liberal	Mike Morris	8,543	50.80	−6.32	$30,276.67
New Democratic	Joan Atkinson	5,717	33.99	+2.34	$4,085.37
Green	Catharine Kendall	1,935	11.50	+0.27	$3,692.23
Christian Heritage	Dee Kranz	336	2.00	–	$1,193.15
Libertarian	Raymond Rodgers	287	1.71	–	$0.00
Total valid votes		16,818	100.00	–	
Total rejected ballots		150	0.88	0.11	
Turnout		16,968	49.06	–8.38	
Registered voters		34,587			
Liberal hold		Swing		–4.33	
Source: Elections BC

2017 British Columbia general election: Prince George-Mackenzie
Party	Candidate	Votes	%	±%	Expenditures
Liberal	Mike Morris	10,725	57.12	+1.54	$49,947
New Democratic	Bobby Deepak	5,942	31.65	-2.62	$53,121
Green	Hilary Crowley	2,109	11.23	+5.54	$1,433
Total valid votes		18,776	100.00		
Total rejected ballots		146	0.77		
Turnout		18,922	57.44		
Source: Elections BC

2013 British Columbia general election: Prince George-Mackenzie
Party	Candidate	Votes	%	±%	Expenditures
Liberal	Mike Morris	10,524	55.58	-0.47	$168,600
New Democratic	Bobby Deepak	6,488	34.27	-2.57	$138,631
Green	Karen McDowell	1,077	5.69	-1.42	$3,465
Conservative	Terry Rysz	845	4.46	-	$21,364
Total valid votes		18,934	100.00		
Total rejected ballots		165	0.86		
Turnout		19,099	56.86		
Source: Elections BC
