= 2013 British Columbia general election =

Canadian provincial election

- May 14, 2013

85 seats in the Legislative Assembly of British Columbia 43 seats needed for a majority
- Opinion polls
- Turnout: 55.32% ▲4.33 pp
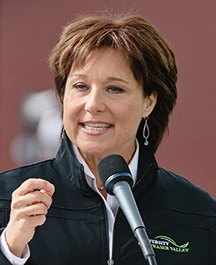

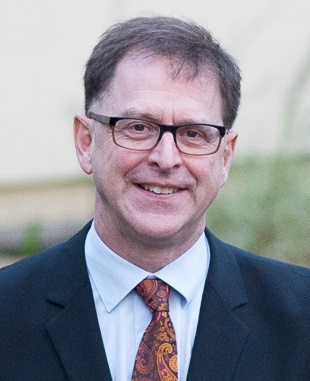

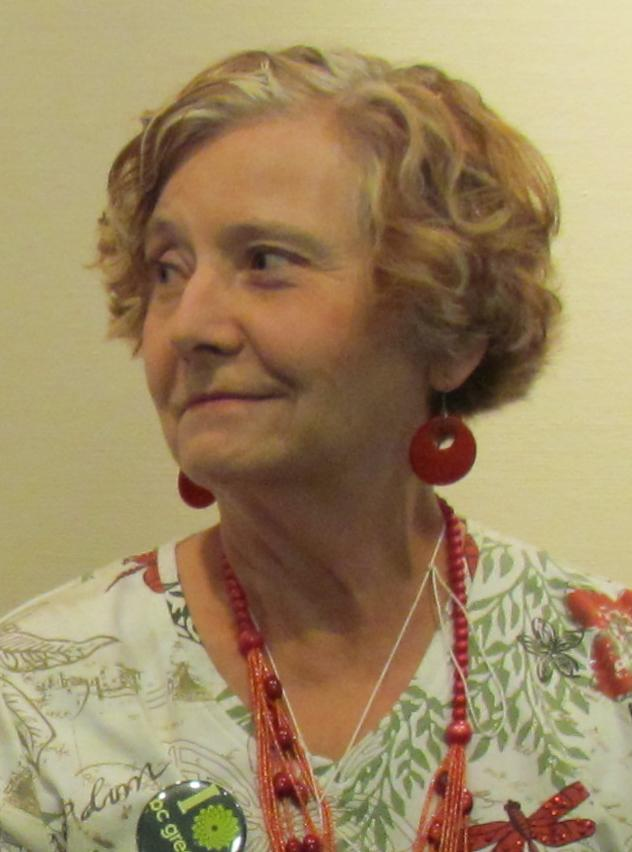
| | First party | Second party | Third party |
|---|---|---|---|
| Leader | Christy Clark | Adrian Dix | Jane Sterk |
| Party | Liberal | New Democratic | Green |
| Leader since | February 26, 2011 | April 17, 2011 | October 21, 2007 |
| Leader's seat | Vancouver-Point Grey (lost re-election) | Vancouver-Kingsway | Ran in Victoria-Beacon Hill (lost) |
| Last election | 49 seats, 45.82% | 35 seats, 42.15% | 0 seats, 8.21% |
| Seats before | 45 | 36 | 0 |
| Seats won | 49 | 34 | 1 |
| Seat change | ▲4 | ▼2 | ▲1 |
| Popular vote | 795,946 | 715,999 | 146,607 |
| Percentage | 44.14% | 39.71% | 8.13% |
| Swing | ▼1.68pp | ▼2.44pp | ▼0.08pp |
- Popular vote by riding. As this is an FPTP election, seat totals are not determined by popular vote, but instead via results by each riding. Click the map for more details.
Premier before election
Christy Clark
Liberal
Premier after election
Christy Clark
Liberal

The 2013 British Columbia general election took place on May 14, 2013, to elect the 85 members of the 40th Parliament of British Columbia to the Legislative Assembly in the Canadian province of British Columbia. The British Columbia Liberal Party (BC Liberals) formed the government during the 39th Parliament prior to this general election, initially under the leadership of Premier Gordon Campbell then after his resignation, Christy Clark. The British Columbia New Democratic Party (BC NDP) under the leadership of Carole James, and then Adrian Dix, formed the Official Opposition. The BC Green Party under the leadership of Jane Sterk and the BC Conservative Party under John Cummins were also included in polling, although neither party had representation at the end of the 39th Parliament.

The Liberal Party won its fourth straight majority; Clark was defeated in her riding, but she was re-elected to the legislature in a subsequent by-election in Westside-Kelowna on July 10, 2013, after Liberal MLA Ben Stewart stepped down on her behalf. The NDP remained the official opposition, losing two seats, and the Green Party won its first-ever seat with future leader Andrew Weaver being elected in the Victoria-area riding of Oak Bay-Gordon Head.

Clark's Liberals had consistently trailed the opposition New Democrats by multiple percentage points in every public opinion poll throughout the campaign. Even poll results released on the last day of the campaign suggested that the New Democrats had an eight to nine percentage point margin over the Liberals. Only one pollster, Forum Research, had released a poll which suggested that the Liberals were close enough that a victory was even possible for them, although even that poll had the New Democrats ahead by two percentage points. That the Liberals not only won an upset victory, but even slightly increased their majorities in the seat count and popular vote, led to significant media debate about the quality of opinion polling in Canadian elections; some, including former premier Mike Harcourt (who resigned from the NDP as a party member in the aftermath of the election), believed that the polls did not sufficiently register a late collapse in NDP support among working-class voters after Dix publicly opposed an expansion of the Trans Mountain pipeline.

This would be the last time a majority government was formed by the BC Liberal Party and the last majority government formed by a right-of-center party until the BC Conservatives' win in the 2026 election.

== Timing ==
Section 23 of British Columbia's Constitution Act provides that general elections occur on the second Tuesday in May of the fourth calendar year after the last election. As an election was held on May 12, 2009, the next election was scheduled for May 14, 2013. The same section, though, makes the fixed election date subject to the Lieutenant Governor's right to dissolve the Legislative Assembly as he or she sees fit.

The writs were dropped April 16, 2013, and the general election was held on May 14, 2013, with advance voting made available on May 8 through 11.

== Background ==
After leading the BC Liberals for 17 years, Gordon Campbell announced he would resign as Premier and party leader in November 2010. This was seen as the result of opposition to the Harmonized Sales Tax, which was very unpopular with voters.

In the ensuing leadership campaign, Christy Clark, the eventual winner, suggested she would prefer to hold an election earlier than 2013 to secure her own mandate. She was believed to be preparing her party for an election as early as autumn 2011. However, due to the unfavourable result from the HST referendum, she decided to rule out an early election.

== Political parties ==
This is a list of political parties who ran candidates in the 2013 election:

| Party | Leader | Expenditures | Notes |
|---|---|---|---|
| British Columbia Liberal Party | Christy Clark | $11,740,241 | The BC Liberals have formed a majority government since May 2001. With the resignation of party leader Gordon Campbell, the new party leader Christy Clark was selected on February 26, 2011. The party claims it is independent of the federal Liberals and the federal Conservatives. |
| British Columbia New Democratic Party | Adrian Dix | $9,090,489 | Affiliated with the federal NDP, the BC NDP held power from 1972–1975 and 1991–2001. On April 17, 2011, Adrian Dix was chosen as the party leader in their 2011 leadership convention. |
| Green Party of British Columbia | Jane Sterk | $177,660 | The party is based on the belief in sustainability and maintains a full policy platform. |
| British Columbia Conservative Party | John Cummins | $154,502 | Having last won a seat in 1978, the Conservative Party has re-emerged as a minor party. According to polling in March 2013, the party holds less than one-third of the centre-right vote (shared with the BC Liberals). The party received a temporary boost when, on March 26, 2012, Abbotsford South MLA John van Dongen announced that he was leaving the BC Liberals to join the BC Conservatives, providing the party with its first representative in decades. Van Dongen shortly quit the party to sit as an independent on September 22, 2012. |
| Advocational International Democratic Party of British Columbia | Michael Yawney | $2,780 | The party was registered in 2006 and despite accumulating over two million dollars in assets the party did not nominate any candidates in the 2009 election. |
| British Columbia Party | | $0 | A right-of-centre party which did not nominate any candidates in the last election and only 2 candidates in the 2005 election. |
| Christian Heritage Party of British Columbia | Wilfred Hanni | $2,111 | The party is based in the supremacy of God and rule of law and maintains a full policy platform. It was founded in 2010 as the BC Heritage Party but changed its name to the Christian Heritage Party in 2012 when it developed ties to the federal Christian Heritage Party. |
| Communist Party of British Columbia | Samuel Hammond | $1,375 | As a provincial branch of the federal Communist Party of Canada, party advocates a communist ideology, including labour rights and limits to corporate control. Active since 2001, the party nominated four candidates in 2001 and three in both the 2005 and 2009 elections. |
| British Columbia Excalibur Party | Michael Halliday | $901 | Founded in 2013, the party has developed an election platform. |
| BC First Party | Salvatore Vetro | $1,768 | Founded in 2010, the party advocates for democratic reforms, including the use of referendums, free votes, and at-large elections for the position of Premier. The party nominated a candidate in the 2011 by-election. |
| Helping Hand Party | Alan Saldanha | | Founded in 2011. The party is based on the belief "that helping others unconditionally provides for a meaningful existence" and intends to run only a single candidate, Alan Saldanha in Surrey-Newton. |
| British Columbia Libertarian Party | | $1,994 | The party advocates for libertarian principles including protecting civil liberties and private property rights, legalizing drugs, and ending government controls on economic activity. Active since the 1980s, the party nominated six candidates in both the 2005 and 2009 elections. |
| British Columbia Marijuana Party | Marc Emery | $751 | The party seeks to legalize marijuana. Active since 2000, the party nominated a full slate of candidates in 2001 and 44 candidates in 2005. The party endorsed the Green Party in the 2009 election but nominated one candidate regardless. |
| Platinum Party of Employers Who Think and Act to Increase Awareness | Espavo Sozo | $0 | Founded in 2005, the party advocates for government accountability. The party nominated 11 candidates in the 2005 election but none in 2009. |
| British Columbia Social Credit Party | | | The once dominant conservative party last formed the government under Bill Vander Zalm and Rita Johnston but has not elected an MLA since 1991. The party did not nominate any candidates in the 2009 election. |
| Unparty: The Consensus-Building Party | Michael Donovan | $0 | Founded in 2011, the party promotes consensus government over adversarial party politics. |
| BC Vision | Jagmohan Bhandari | $179 | Founded in 2013, the party has developed an election platform that includes technology development, environmental conservation, public health, cross-generational communication, senior education, and fiscal responsibility. |
| Work Less Party of British Columbia | Conrad Schmidt | $9,420 | The party seeks to legislate a 32-hour or four-day work week. Active since 2003, the party nominated 11 candidate in 2005 and two in 2009. |
| Your Political Party of British Columbia | James Filippelli | $1,884 | The party seeks to reduce the influence of political parties on government and increase public review of government operations, inclusive of crown corporations and local governments. They maintain a full platform which includes making all campaign promises legally binding. Active since 2002, the party nominated one candidate in 2005 and two in 2009. |

== Results ==
Elections to the 40th Legislative Assembly of British Columbia (2013)
| Party | Leader | Candidates | Votes | | | | Seats | | |
| Party | Leader | Candidates | # | ± | % | Change (pp) | 2009 | 2013 | ± |
|---|---|---|---|---|---|---|---|---|---|
| Liberal | Christy Clark | 85 | 795,274 | 43,613▲ | 44.13 | −1.69 | 49 | 49 / 85 | Steady |
| New Democratic | Adrian Dix | 85 | 715,855 | 24,291▲ | 39.72 | −2.43 | 35 | 34 / 85 | 1▼ |
| Green | Jane Sterk | 61 | 146,685 | 12,069▲ | 8.14 | −0.07 | – | 1 / 85 | 1▲ |
| Conservative | John Cummins | 56 | 85,637 | 51,186▲ | 4.75 | 2.65 | | | |
| Independent | | 46 | 49,306 | 30,620▲ | 2.74 | 1.60 | 1 | 1 / 85 | Steady |
| Libertarian | | 8 | 2,050 | 564▲ | 0.11 | 0.02 | | | |
| BC First | Salvatore Vetro | 2 | 1,275 | 1,275▲ | 0.07 | New | | | |
| Excalibur | Michael Halliday | 6 | 995 | 995▲ | 0.06 | New | | | |
| Vision | Jagmohan Bhandari | 4 | 878 | 878▲ | 0.05 | New | | | |
| Christian Heritage | Wilfred Hanni | 2 | 828 | 828▲ | 0.05 | Returned | | | |
| Marijuana | Marc Emery | 2 | 766 | 405▲ | 0.04 | 0.02 | | | |
| Your Political Party | James Filippelli | 2 | 528 | 193▲ | 0.03 | 0.01 | | | |
| British Columbia Party | | 3 | 445 | 445▲ | 0.02 | Returned | | | |
| Communist | Samuel Hammond | 4 | 389 | 44▼ | 0.02 | 0.00% | | | |
| Social Credit | | 1 | 374 | 374▲ | 0.02 | Returned | | | |
| Helping Hand Party | Alan Saldanha | 1 | 282 | 282▲ | 0.02 | New | | | |
| Unparty | Michael Donovan | 2 | 244 | 244▲ | 0.01 | New | | | |
| Work Less | Conrad Schmidt | 2 | 145 | 177▼ | 0.01 | −0.01 | | | |
| Advocational | Michael Yawney | 2 | 137 | 137▲ | 0.01 | New | | | |
| Platinum | Espavo Sozo | 2 | 56 | 56▲ | – | Returned | | | |
| Total | | 376 | 1,802,149 | | 100.00% | | | | |

=== Vote and seat summaries ===
Ternary plots – shift of electoral support (2009–2013)
2009

2013
Electoral districts identified by colours of winning parties

== MLAs elected ==
Abbotsford-Mission: Simon Gibson
Abbotsford South: Darryl Plecas
Abbotsford West: Mike de Jong
Alberni-Pacific Rim: Scott Fraser
Boundary-Similkameen: Linda Larson
Burnaby-Deer Lake: Kathy Corrigan
Burnaby-Edmonds: Raj Chouhan
Burnaby-Lougheed: Jane Shin
Burnaby North: Richard Lee
Cariboo-Chilcotin: Donna Barnett
Cariboo North: Coralee Oakes
Chilliwack: John Martin
Chilliwack-Hope: Laurie Throness
Columbia River-Revelstoke: Norm Macdonald
Comox Valley: Don McRae
Coquitlam-Burke Mountain: Douglas Horne
Coquitlam-Maillardville: Selina Robinson
Cowichan Valley: Bill Routley
Delta North: Scott Hamilton
Delta South: Vicki Huntington
Esquimalt-Royal Roads: Maurine Karagianis
Fort Langley-Aldergrove: Rich Coleman
Fraser-Nicola: Jackie Tegart
Juan de Fuca: John Horgan
Kamloops-North Thompson: Terry Lake
Kamloops-South Thompson: Todd Stone
Kelowna-Lake Country: Norm Letnick
Kelowna-Mission: Steve Thomson
Kootenay East: Bill Bennett
Kootenay West: Katrine Conroy
Langley: Mary Polak
Maple Ridge-Mission: Marc Dalton
Maple Ridge-Pitt Meadows: Doug Bing
Nanaimo: Leonard Krog
Nanaimo-North Cowichan: Doug Routley
Nechako Lakes: John Rustad
Nelson-Creston: Michelle Mungall
New Westminster: Judy Darcy
North Coast: Jennifer Rice
North Island: Claire Trevena
North Vancouver-Lonsdale: Naomi Yamamoto
North Vancouver-Seymour: Jane Thornthwaite
Oak Bay-Gordon Head: Andrew Weaver
Parksville-Qualicum: Michelle Stilwell
Peace River North: Pat Pimm
Peace River South: Mike Bernier
Penticton: Dan Ashton
Port Coquitlam: Mike Farnworth
Port Moody-Coquitlam: Linda Reimer
Powell River-Sunshine Coast: Nicholas Simons
Prince George-Mackenzie: Mike Morris
Prince George-Valemount: Shirley Bond
Richmond Centre: Teresa Wat
Richmond East: Linda Reid
Richmond-Steveston: John Yap
Saanich North and the Islands: Gary Holman
Saanich South: Lana Popham
Shuswap: Greg Kyllo
Skeena: Robin Austin
Stikine: Doug Donaldson
Surrey-Cloverdale: Stephanie Cadieux
Surrey-Fleetwood: Peter Fassbender
Surrey-Green Timbers: Sue Hammell
Surrey-Newton: Harry Bains
Surrey-Panorama: Marvin Hunt
Surrey-Tynehead: Amrik Virk
Surrey-Whalley: Bruce Ralston
Surrey-White Rock: Gordon Hogg
Vancouver-Fairview: George Heyman
Vancouver-False Creek: Sam Sullivan
Vancouver-Fraserview: Suzanne Anton
Vancouver-Hastings: Shane Simpson
Vancouver-Kensington: Mable Elmore
Vancouver-Kingsway: Adrian Dix
Vancouver-Langara: Moira Stilwell
Vancouver-Mount Pleasant: Jenny Kwan
Vancouver-Point Grey: David Eby
Vancouver-Quilchena: Andrew Wilkinson
Vancouver-West End: Spencer Chandra Herbert
Vernon-Monashee: Eric Foster
Victoria-Beacon Hill: Carole James
Victoria-Swan Lake: Rob Fleming
West Vancouver-Capilano: Ralph Sultan
West Vancouver-Sea to Sky: Jordan Sturdy
Westside-Kelowna: Ben Stewart

=== Synopsis of results ===
Results by riding – 2013 British Columbia general election
| Riding | Winning party | | | | | | Turnout (Note: Including spoilt ballots) | Votes (Note: Parties receiving more than 1% of the popular vote, or fielding candidates in at least half of the constituencies, are listed separately.) | | | | | | |
| Name | 2009 | Party | Votes | Share | Margin # | Margin % | Turnout | Lib | NDP | Grn | Con | Ind | Oth | Total |
|---|---|---|---|---|---|---|---|---|---|---|---|---|---|---|
| Abbotsford-Mission | Lib | Lib | 10,417 | 50.67% | 4,826 | 23.48% | 56.63% | 10,417 | 5,591 | 1,865 | 1,946 | 619 | 119 | 20,557 |
| Abbotsford South | Lib | Lib | 9,563 | 47.74% | 3,977 | 19.85% | 55.77% | 9,563 | 4,210 | – | – | 5,586 | 673 | 20,032 |
| Abbotsford West | Lib | Lib | 9,473 | 50.65% | 4,043 | 21.62% | 59.38% | 9,473 | 5,430 | 877 | 1,791 | 1,082 | 49 | 18,702 |
| Alberni-Pacific Rim | NDP | NDP | 10,569 | 57.55% | 4,228 | 23.02% | 58.22% | 6,341 | 10,569 | – | 1,456 | – | – | 18,366 |
| Boundary-Similkameen | Lib | Lib | 8,499 | 46.59% | 1,386 | 7.60% | 61.85% | 8,499 | 7,113 | 1,602 | – | 1,030 | – | 18,244 |
| Burnaby-Deer Lake | NDP | NDP | 8,189 | 48.48% | 903 | 5.35% | 48.03% | 7,286 | 8,189 | 1,417 | – | – | – | 16,892 |
| Burnaby-Edmonds | NDP | NDP | 9,253 | 51.43% | 2,303 | 12.80% | 49.00% | 6,950 | 9,253 | 1,573 | – | – | 215 | 17,991 |
| Burnaby-Lougheed | Lib | NDP | 8,952 | 44.26% | 743 | 3.67% | 56.24% | 8,209 | 8,952 | 1,665 | – | 1,399 | – | 20,225 |
| Burnaby North | Lib | Lib | 10,543 | 46.82% | 668 | 2.97% | 55.03% | 10,543 | 9,875 | 1,577 | – | 523 | – | 22,518 |
| Cariboo-Chilcotin | Lib | Lib | 7,679 | 56.18% | 2,939 | 21.50% | 63.64% | 7,679 | 4,740 | 747 | – | 503 | – | 13,669 |
| Cariboo North | NDP | Lib | 5,867 | 41.41% | 603 | 4.26% | 59.77% | 5,867 | 3,036 | – | – | 5,264 | – | 14,167 |
| Chilliwack | Lib | Lib | 9,989 | 47.56% | 3,438 | 16.37% | 55.85 % | 9,989 | 6,551 | 1,766 | 2,515 | – | 181 | 21,002 |
| Chilliwack-Hope | Lib | Lib | 10,053 | 49.15% | 2,689 | 13.15% | 57.38% | 10,053 | 7,364 | – | 2,202 | 833 | – | 20,452 |
| Columbia River-Revelstoke | NDP | NDP | 6,463 | 48.26% | 1,616 | 12.07% | 53.60% | 4,847 | 6,463 | 921 | 1,162 | – | – | 13,393 |
| Comox Valley | Lib | Lib | 14,248 | 44.27% | 1,768 | 5.49% | 63.99% | 14,248 | 12,480 | 3,718 | 1,740 | – | – | 32,186 |
| Coquitlam-Burke Mountain | Lib | Lib | 9,766 | 49.90% | 2,451 | 12.52% | 53.23% | 9,766 | 7,315 | 1,144 | 1,071 | – | 277 | 19,573 |
| Coquitlam-Maillardville | NDP | NDP | 9,930 | 45.74% | 41 | 0.19% | 56.69% | 9,889 | 9,930 | 1,891 | – | – | – | 21,710 |
| Cowichan Valley | NDP | NDP | 10,696 | 40.14% | 1,397 | 5.24% | 61.90% | 9,299 | 10,696 | 5,102 | 1,223 | 326 | – | 26,646 |
| Delta North | NDP | Lib | 9,613 | 44.53% | 203 | 0.94% | 59.94% | 9,613 | 9,410 | 1,312 | 983 | 210 | 58 | 21,586 |
| Delta South | Ind | Ind | 11,376 | 47.80% | 2,655 | 11.16% | 68.29% | 8,721 | 3,700 | – | – | 11,376 | – | 23,797 |
| Esquimalt-Royal Roads | NDP | NDP | 10,963 | 48.20% | 4,452 | 19.57% | 58.23% | 6,511 | 10,963 | 4,928 | – | 343 | – | 22,745 |
| Fort Langley-Aldergrove | Lib | Lib | 15,989 | 55.10% | 8,478 | 29.22% | 60.53% | 15,989 | 7,511 | 2,229 | 2,615 | 672 | – | 29,016 |
| Fraser-Nicola | NDP | Lib | 6,002 | 44.14% | 614 | 4.52% | 61.52% | 6,002 | 5,388 | 1,314 | 895 | – | – | 13,599 |
| Juan de Fuca | NDP | NDP | 12,338 | 53.32% | 5,218 | 22.55% | 58.07% | 7,120 | 12,338 | 3,682 | – | – | – | 23,140 |
| Kamloops-North Thompson | Lib | Lib | 12,183 | 52.06% | 3,044 | 13.01% | 57.97% | 12,183 | 9,139 | – | 1,644 | 436 | – | 23,402 |
| Kamloops-South Thompson | Lib | Lib | 14,956 | 57.11% | 5,752 | 21.96% | 62.18% | 14,956 | 9,204 | – | 1,603 | 425 | – | 26,188 |
| Kelowna-Lake Country | Lib | Lib | 12,149 | 56.78% | 6,843 | 31.98% | 47.71% | 12,149 | 5,306 | 1,591 | 2,351 | – | – | 21,397 |
| Kelowna-Mission | Lib | Lib | 13,687 | 56.86% | 7,466 | 31.02% | 53.58% | 13,687 | 6,221 | – | 3,051 | 1,113 | – | 24,072 |
| Kootenay East | Lib | Lib | 10,252 | 62.99% | 4,229 | 25.98% | 53.41% | 10,252 | 6,023 | – | – | – | – | 16,275 |
| Kootenay West | NDP | NDP | 11,349 | 63.01% | 7,508 | 41.68% | 56.92% | 3,841 | 11,349 | – | – | 2,822 | – | 18,012 |
| Langley | Lib | Lib | 14,039 | 51.44% | 6,636 | 24.31% | 59.06% | 14,039 | 7,403 | 2,608 | 3,242 | – | – | 27,292 |
| Maple Ridge-Mission | Lib | Lib | 10,327 | 46.61% | 1,507 | 6.80% | 57.91% | 10,327 | 8,820 | 1,818 | 1,190 | – | – | 22,155 |
| Maple Ridge-Pitt Meadows | NDP | Lib | 10,824 | 45.49% | 620 | 2.61% | 59.87% | 10,824 | 10,204 | 2,178 | – | 589 | – | 23,795 |
| Nanaimo | NDP | NDP | 10,821 | 46.25% | 2,253 | 9.63% | 57.96% | 8,568 | 10,821 | 2,532 | 1,221 | 253 | – | 23,395 |
| Nanaimo-North Cowichan | NDP | NDP | 11,542 | 46.21% | 3,857 | 15.44% | 61.11% | 7,685 | 11,542 | 3,430 | 1,603 | 718 | – | 24,978 |
| Nechako Lakes | Lib | Lib | 5,324 | 53.79% | 2,587 | 26.14% | 58.46% | 5,324 | 2,737 | 510 | 1,253 | – | 74 | 9,898 |
| Nelson-Creston | NDP | NDP | 8,200 | 50.73% | 3,623 | 22.41% | 57.63% | 4,577 | 8,200 | 3,387 | – | – | – | 16,164 |
| New Westminster | NDP | NDP | 13,170 | 48.84% | 4,173 | 15.48% | 57.81% | 8,997 | 13,170 | 2,252 | 1,318 | 1,038 | 190 | 26,965 |
| North Coast | NDP | NDP | 4,617 | 56.72% | 1,925 | 23.65% | 52.85% | 2,692 | 4,617 | 831 | – | – | – | 8,140 |
| North Island | NDP | NDP | 11,885 | 50.70% | 2,002 | 8.54% | 57.28% | 9,883 | 11,885 | – | 1,675 | – | – | 23,443 |
| North Vancouver-Lonsdale | Lib | Lib | 11,060 | 45.47% | 1,188 | 4.88% | 60.38% | 11,060 | 9,872 | 2,257 | 833 | – | 304 | 24,326 |
| North Vancouver-Seymour | Lib | Lib | 13,186 | 50.92% | 4,662 | 18.00% | 66.99% | 13,186 | 8,524 | 1,897 | 1,206 | 1,081 | – | 25,894 |
| Oak Bay-Gordon Head | Lib | Grn | 10,722 | 40.43% | 2,955 | 11.14% | 69.56% | 7,767 | 7,536 | 10,722 | 492 | – | – | 26,517 |
| Parksville-Qualicum | Lib | Lib | 14,518 | 50.13% | 3,786 | 13.07% | 67.94% | 14,518 | 10,732 | – | 3,710 | – | – | 28,960 |
| Peace River North | Lib | Lib | 7,905 | 58.94% | 4,618 | 34.43% | 51.47% | 7,905 | 1,319 | – | 900 | 3,287 | – | 13,411 |
| Peace River South | Lib | Lib | 4,373 | 46.73% | 1,827 | 19.52% | 49.89% | 4,373 | 1,988 | – | 2,546 | 451 | – | 9,358 |
| Penticton | Lib | Lib | 11,536 | 45.85% | 1,382 | 5.49% | 58.27% | 11,536 | 10,154 | – | 2,288 | – | 1,185 | 25,163 |
| Port Coquitlam | NDP | NDP | 11,755 | 52.94% | 3,635 | 16.37% | 57.26% | 8,120 | 11,755 | – | 1,525 | – | 805 | 22,205 |
| Port Moody-Coquitlam | Lib | Lib | 9,675 | 46.39% | 437 | 2.10% | 58.75% | 9,675 | 9,238 | 1,708 | – | – | 237 | 20,858 |
| Powell River-Sunshine Coast | NDP | NDP | 13,120 | 55.20% | 5,328 | 22.42% | 63.24% | 7,792 | 13,120 | 2,856 | – | – | – | 23,768 |
| Prince George-Mackenzie | Lib | Lib | 10,524 | 55.58% | 4,036 | 21.32% | 56.86% | 10,524 | 6,488 | 1,077 | 845 | – | – | 18,934 |
| Prince George-Valemount | Lib | Lib | 11,291 | 56.95% | 4,175 | 21.06% | 56.56% | 11,291 | 7,116 | – | 1,105 | – | 314 | 19,826 |
| Richmond Centre | Lib | Lib | 9,462 | 49.83% | 5,026 | 26.47% | 43.65% | 9,462 | 4,436 | 1,678 | 961 | 2,371 | 82 | 18,990 |
| Richmond East | Lib | Lib | 11,592 | 54.68% | 5,545 | 26.16% | 47.58% | 11,592 | 6,047 | 1,178 | 1,827 | 380 | 175 | 21,199 |
| Richmond-Steveston | Lib | Lib | 12,137 | 51.80% | 5,529 | 23.60% | 55.39% | 12,137 | 6,608 | 1,899 | 2,625 | – | 162 | 23,431 |
| Saanich North and the Islands | Lib | NDP | 10,515 | 33.27% | 163 | 0.52% | 69.21% | 10,352 | 10,515 | 10,136 | – | 599 | – | 31,602 |
| Saanich South | NDP | NDP | 11,946 | 45.55% | 2,690 | 10.26% | 67.11% | 9,256 | 11,946 | 4,011 | 873 | 142 | – | 26,228 |
| Shuswap | Lib | Lib | 11,992 | 47.92% | 4,594 | 18.36% | 60.41% | 11,992 | 7,398 | 2,338 | 3,232 | – | 63 | 25,023 |
| Skeena | NDP | NDP | 5,609 | 47.71% | 522 | 4.44% | 55.85% | 5,087 | 5,609 | – | 797 | – | 263 | 11,756 |
| Stikine | NDP | NDP | 4,081 | 47.11% | 909 | 10.49% | 62.82% | 3,172 | 4,081 | 303 | 533 | 59 | 514 | 8,662 |
| Surrey-Cloverdale | Lib | Lib | 18,051 | 59.53% | 9,274 | 30.59% | 57.79% | 18,051 | 8,777 | – | 2,545 | 949 | – | 30,322 |
| Surrey-Fleetwood | NDP | Lib | 8,974 | 45.43% | 200 | 1.01% | 55.72% | 8,974 | 8,774 | 1,147 | 801 | – | 59 | 19,755 |
| Surrey-Green Timbers | NDP | NDP | 9,386 | 58.06% | 3,805 | 23.54% | 52.32% | 5,581 | 9,386 | 655 | 444 | – | 101 | 16,167 |
| Surrey-Newton | NDP | NDP | 9,788 | 56.42% | 3,184 | 18.35% | 52.56% | 6,604 | 9,788 | – | 674 | – | 282 | 17,348 |
| Surrey-Panorama | Lib | Lib | 14,139 | 54.29% | 4,831 | 18.55% | 57.72% | 14,139 | 9,308 | 1,478 | 1,037 | 81 | – | 26,043 |
| Surrey-Tynehead | Lib | Lib | 9,172 | 48.15% | 1,633 | 8.57% | 52.13% | 9,172 | 7,539 | – | 2,040 | – | 298 | 19,049 |
| Surrey-Whalley | NDP | NDP | 10,405 | 61.43% | 5,401 | 31.88% | 46.28% | 5,004 | 10,405 | – | 1,110 | – | 420 | 16,939 |
| Surrey-White Rock | Lib | Lib | 15,092 | 58.09% | 7,912 | 30.45% | 64.73% | 15,092 | 7,180 | 2,304 | 1,301 | – | 105 | 25,982 |
| Vancouver-Fairview | Lib | NDP | 12,649 | 47.32% | 1,351 | 5.05% | 58.98% | 11,298 | 12,649 | 2,785 | – | – | – | 26,732 |
| Vancouver-False Creek | Lib | Lib | 11,228 | 52.21% | 3,247 | 15.10% | 50.11% | 11,228 | 7,981 | 1,928 | – | 199 | 171 | 21,507 |
| Vancouver-Fraserview | Lib | Lib | 10,118 | 46.74% | 470 | 2.17% | 54.96% | 10,118 | 9,648 | 1,230 | 653 | – | – | 21,649 |
| Vancouver-Hastings | NDP | NDP | 12,782 | 59.51% | 6,846 | 31.87% | 53.21% | 5,936 | 12,782 | 2,386 | – | – | 374 | 21,478 |
| Vancouver-Kensington | NDP | NDP | 10,687 | 51.37% | 2,722 | 13.09% | 54.33% | 7,965 | 10,687 | 1,578 | 572 | – | – | 20,802 |
| Vancouver-Kingsway | NDP | NDP | 10,409 | 56.77% | 3,809 | 20.77% | 48.96% | 6,600 | 10,409 | 1,327 | – | – | – | 18,336 |
| Vancouver-Langara | Lib | Lib | 10,234 | 52.60% | 2,787 | 14.33% | 50.52% | 10,234 | 7,447 | 1,055 | 674 | – | 45 | 19,455 |
| Vancouver-Mount Pleasant | NDP | NDP | 13,845 | 65.83% | 9,903 | 47.09% | 49.77% | 3,942 | 13,845 | 2,506 | – | 260 | 478 | 21,031 |
| Vancouver-Point Grey | Lib | NDP | 11,499 | 47.59% | 1,063 | 4.40% | 58.97% | 10,436 | 11,499 | 1,636 | 392 | 72 | 128 | 24,163 |
| Vancouver-Quilchena | Lib | Lib | 14,496 | 64.32% | 8,791 | 39.00% | 59.45% | 14,496 | 5,705 | 1,667 | – | 671 | – | 22,539 |
| Vancouver-West End | NDP | NDP | 10,755 | 56.81% | 5,406 | 28.55% | 50.64% | 5,349 | 10,755 | 2,156 | – | 132 | 540 | 18,932 |
| Vernon-Monashee | Lib | Lib | 12,503 | 46.34% | 3,270 | 12.12% | 57.41% | 12,503 | 9,233 | 1,905 | 3,169 | 169 | – | 26,979 |
| Victoria-Beacon Hill | NDP | NDP | 12,697 | 48.82% | 3,901 | 15.00% | 58.67% | 4,386 | 12,697 | 8,796 | – | – | 131 | 26,010 |
| Victoria-Swan Lake | NDP | NDP | 12,350 | 54.49% | 7,090 | 31.28% | 58.07% | 5,055 | 12,350 | 5,260 | – | – | – | 22,665 |
| West Vancouver-Capilano | Lib | Lib | 15,776 | 67.03% | 10,509 | 44.65% | 60.47% | 15,776 | 5,267 | – | 1,156 | 1,018 | 320 | 23,537 |
| West Vancouver-Sea to Sky | Lib | Lib | 11,275 | 52.50% | 4,309 | 20.06% | 56.68% | 11,275 | 6,966 | 2,359 | 653 | 225 | – | 21,478 |
| Westside-Kelowna | Lib | Lib | 12,405 | 58.07% | 5,817 | 27.23% | 47.52% | 12,405 | 6,588 | – | 2,368 | – | – | 21,361 |

= Open seat
= turnout is above provincial average
= winning candidate was in previous Legislature
= Incumbent had switched allegiance
= Previously incumbent in another riding
= Not incumbent; was previously elected to the Legislature
= Incumbency arose from by-election gain
= other incumbents renominated
= previously an MP in the House of Commons of Canada
= Multiple candidates

=== Summary analysis ===
Party candidates in 2nd place
| Party in 1st place | Party in 2nd place | | | | | Total |
| Party in 1st place | Lib | NDP | Grn | Con | Ind | Total |
|---|---|---|---|---|---|---|
| Liberal | | 45 | | 1 | 3 | 49 |
| New Democratic | 32 | | 2 | | | 34 |
| Green | 1 | | | | | 1 |
| Independent | 1 | | | | | 1 |
| Total | 34 | 45 | 2 | 1 | 3 | 85 |

Candidates ranked 1st to 5th place, by party
| Parties | 1st | 2nd | 3rd | 4th | 5th |
|---|---|---|---|---|---|
| █ Liberal | 49 | 34 | 2 | | |
| █ New Democratic | 34 | 45 | 6 | | |
| █ Independent | 1 | 3 | 1 | 19 | 17 |
| █ Green | 1 | 2 | 45 | 11 | 2 |
| █ Conservative | | 1 | 30 | 24 | 1 |
| █ Libertarian | | | | 2 | 4 |
| █ Vision | | | | 2 | 2 |
| █ Marijuana | | | | 2 | |
| █ Excalibur | | | | 1 | 2 |
| █ BC First | | | | 1 | 1 |
| █ British Columbia Party | | | | 1 | 1 |
| █ Communist | | | | 1 | |
| █ Christian Heritage | | | | 1 | |
| █ Helping Hand Party | | | | 1 | |
| █ Social Credit | | | | 1 | |
| █ Your Political Party | | | | 1 | |
| █ Advocational | | | | | 2 |
| █ Platinum | | | | | 1 |
| █ Unparty | | | | | 1 |

Resulting composition of the 39th Legislative Assembly of British Columbia
| Source | | Party | | | | |
|---|---|---|---|---|---|---|
| Source | | Lib | NDP | Grn | Ind | Total |
| Seats retained | Incumbents returned | 24 | 27 | | 1 | 52 |
| Seats retained | Open seats held – new MLAs | 16 | 3 | | | 19 |
| Seats retained | Open seats held – taken by MLA previously incumbent in another riding | 1 | | | | 1 |
| Seats retained | Byelection losses reversed | 2 | | | | 2 |
| Seats retained | Ouster of incumbent changing allegiance | 1 | | | | 1 |
| Seats changing hands | Incumbents defeated | 3 | 2 | 1 | | 6 |
| Seats changing hands | Open seats gained | 2 | 2 | | | 4 |
| Total | | 49 | 34 | 1 | 1 | 85 |

=== Voter turnout ===
Voter turnout was 57.1 percent, but varied from riding to riding. 10 of the 85 ridings had less than 50 percent voter turnout. Richmond and Kelowna were the only major cities with under 50 percent turnout.

Voter turnout in the 2013 BC general election

=== Retiring incumbents ===
Liberals

- George Abbott, Shuswap
- Bill Barisoff, Penticton
- Pat Bell, Prince George-Mackenzie
- Harry Bloy, Burnaby-Lougheed
- Ron Cantelon, Parksville-Qualicum
- Murray Coell, Saanich North and the Islands
- Kevin Falcon, Surrey-Cloverdale
- Colin Hansen, Vancouver-Quilchena
- Randy Hawes, Abbotsford-Mission
- Dave Hayer, Surrey-Tynehead
- Kash Heed, Vancouver-Fraserview
- Rob Howard, Richmond Centre
- Kevin Krueger, Kamloops-South Thompson
- Blair Lekstrom, Peace River South
- John Les, Chilliwack
- Joan McIntyre, West Vancouver-Sea to Sky
- Mary McNeil, Vancouver-False Creek

New Democrats

- Dawn Black, New Westminster
- Gary Coons, North Coast
- Guy Gentner, Delta North
- Michael Sather, Maple Ridge-Pitt Meadows
- Diane Thorne, Coquitlam-Maillardville

Independents

- John Slater, Boundary-Similkameen

=== Seats changing hands ===
8 incumbent MLAs lost their seats:

| Party | Name | Constituency | Year elected | Seat held by party since | Defeated by | Elected party in 2013 |
|---|---|---|---|---|---|---|
| New Democratic | Harry Lali | Fraser-Nicola | 2009 | 2009 | Jackie Tegart | BC Liberal |
| New Democratic | Gwen O'Mahony | Chilliwack-Hope | 2012 | 2012 | Laurie Throness | BC Liberal |
| New Democratic | Jagrup Brar | Surrey-Fleetwood | 2004 | 2009 | Peter Fassbender | BC Liberal |
| BC Liberal | Harry Bloy | Burnaby-Lougheed | 2009 | 2009 | Jane Shin | New Democratic |
| New Democratic | Joe Trasolini | Port Moody-Coquitlam | 2012 | 2012 | Linda Reimer | BC Liberal |
| BC Liberal | Margaret MacDiarmid | Vancouver-Fairview | 2009 | 2009 | George Heyman | New Democratic |
| BC Liberal | Christy Clark | Vancouver-Point Grey | 2011 | 2011 | David Eby | New Democratic |
| BC Liberal | Ida Chong | Oak Bay-Gordon Head | 1996 | 1996 | Andrew Weaver | Green Party |

Open seats changing hands

| Party in 2009 | Candidate | Retiring incumbent | Constituency | Defeated by | Elected party in 2013 |
|---|---|---|---|---|---|
| New Democratic | Elizabeth Rosenau | Michael Sather | Maple Ridge-Pitt Meadows | Doug Bing | BC Liberal |
| New Democratic | Sylvia Bishop | Guy Gentner | Delta North | Scott Hamilton | BC Liberal |
| BC Liberal | Stephen P. Roberts | Murray Coell | Saanich North and the Islands | Gary Holman | New Democratic |

== Opinion polls ==
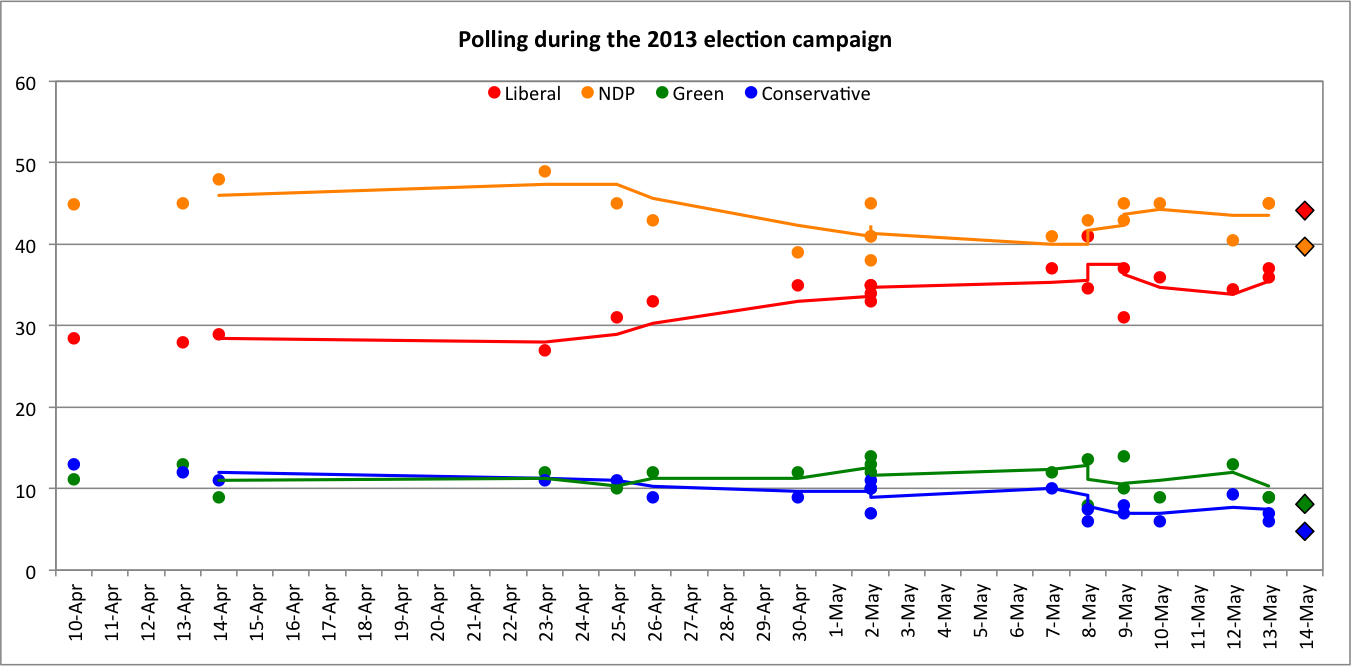
Voting intentions leading up to the 2013 election

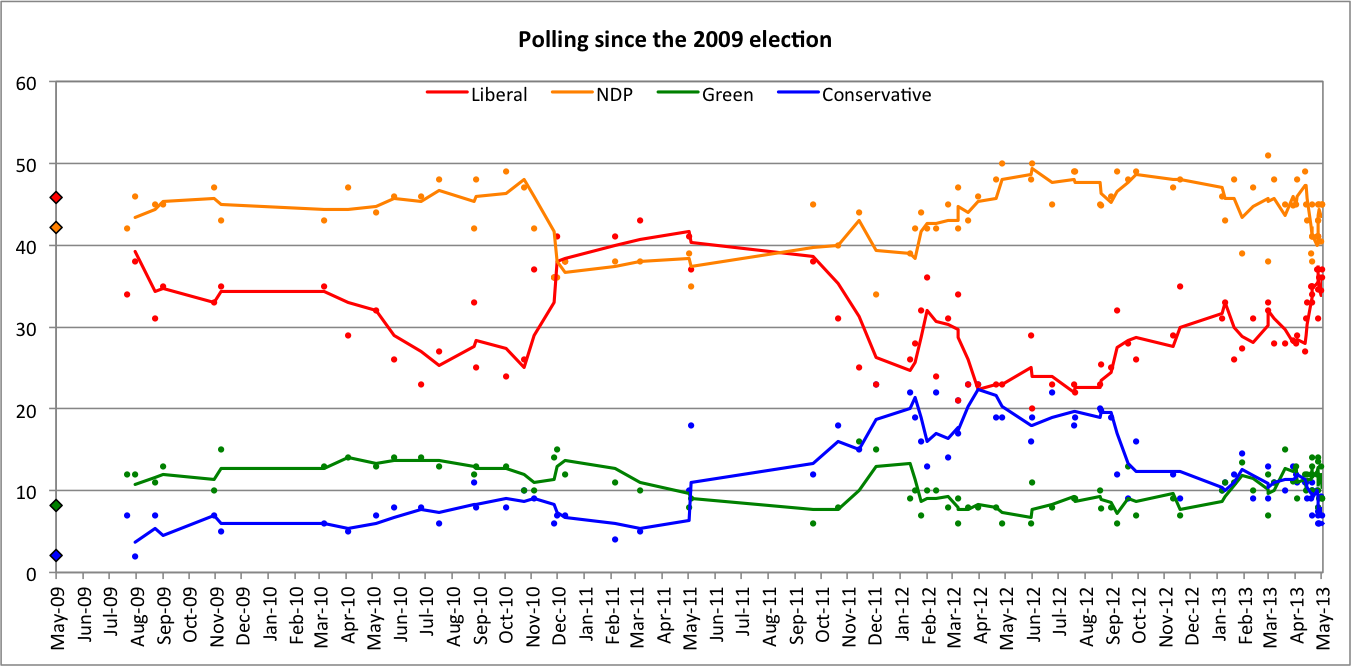
Voting intentions since the 2009 election

Opinion polling in the election period
| Polling firm | Date of polling | Source | Lib | NDP | Grn | Con | Oth | Type of poll | Sample size |
|---|---|---|---|---|---|---|---|---|---|
| 2013 election | May 14, 2013 | | 44.14 | 39.71 | 8.13 | 4.76 | 3.25 | Ballot | 1,803,051 |
| Ipsos Reid | May 13, 2013 | | 37 | 45 | 9 | 6 | 3 | Online | 800 |
| Angus Reid | May 12–13, 2013 | | 36 | 45 | 9 | 7 | 3 | Online | 803 |
| EKOS | May 10–12, 2013 | | 34.5 | 40.5 | 13.0 | 9.3 | 2.7 | IVR | 861 |
| Angus Reid | May 9–10, 2013 | | 36 | 45 | 9 | 6 | 4 | Online | 808 |
| Justason Market Intelligence | May 8–9, 2013 | | 31 | 45 | 14 | 8 | 3 | Online | 700 |
| Ipsos Reid | May 8–9, 2013 | | 37 | 43 | 10 | 7 | 3 | Online | 800 |
| Forum Research | May 8, 2013 | | 41 | 43 | 8 | 6 | 2 | IVR | 1,147 |
| Hill & Knowlton | May 7–8, 2013 | | 34.6 | 41.1 | 13.6 | 7.5 | 3.3 | Online | 804 |
| Oraclepoll Research | May 5–7, 2013 | | 37 | 41 | 12 | 10 | | Telephone | 1,000 |
| Campaign Research | May 2, 2013 | | 35 | 38 | 13 | 10 | 5 | IVR | 1,303 |
| Angus Reid | May 1–2, 2013 | | 34 | 41 | 12 | 10 | 3 | Online | 808 |
| Ipsos Reid | April 30 – May 2, 2013 | | 35 | 45 | 10 | 7 | 3 | Online | 1,000 |
| Insights West | April 29 – May 2, 2013 | | 33 | 41 | 14 | 11 | 1 | Online | 855 |
| Forum Research | April 30, 2013 | | 35 | 39 | 12 | 9 | 3 | IVR | 1,055 |
| Abacus Data | April 23–26, 2013 | | 33 | 43 | 12 | 9 | 3 | Online | 1,042 |
| Angus Reid | April 24–25, 2013 | | 31 | 45 | 10 | 11 | 3 | Online | 812 |
| Justason Market Intelligence | April 15–23, 2013 | | 27 | 49 | 12 | 11 | 2 | Telephone/online | 600 |
| Ipsos Reid | April 11–14, 2013 | | 29 | 48 | 9 | 11 | 3 | Online | 800 |
| Angus Reid | April 12–13, 2013 | | 28 | 45 | 13 | 12 | 3 | Online | 804 |
| EKOS | April 3–10, 2013 | | 28.4 | 44.9 | 11.1 | 13.0 | 2.7 | IVR | 917 |
| Election 2009 | May 12, 2009 | – | 45.82 | 42.15 | 8.21 | 2.10 | 1.72 | Ballot | 1,640,542 |

Opinion polling from 2009 to March 2013
| Polling firm | Date of polling | Source | Lib | NDP | Grn | Con | Oth | Type of poll | Sample size |
|---|---|---|---|---|---|---|---|---|---|
| Insights West | March 26–31, 2013 | | 28 | 45 | 15 | 10 | 2 | Online | 855 |
| Angus Reid | March 18–19, 2013 | | 28 | 48 | 11 | 11 | 2 | Online | 809 |
| Campaign Research | March 12, 2013 | | 33 | 38 | 12 | 13 | 4 | IVR | 1,112 |
| Ipsos Reid | March 8–12, 2013 | | 32 | 51 | 7 | 9 | 1 | Online | 1,000 |
| Angus Reid | February 21–22, 2013 | | 31 | 47 | 10 | 9 | 3 | Online | 803 |
| EKOS | February 1–10, 2013 | | 27.4 | 39.0 | 13.5 | 14.6 | 5.5 | IVR | 687 |
| Justason Market Intelligence | January 25 – February 1, 2013 | | 26 | 48 | 11 | 12 | 3 | Telephone/online | 600 |
| Mustel Group | January 11–21, 2013 | | 33 | 43 | 11 | 11 | 2 | Telephone | 509 |
| Angus Reid | January 17–18, 2013 | | 31 | 46 | 10 | 10 | 3 | Online | 802 |
| Ipsos Reid | November 26–30, 2012 | | 35 | 48 | 7 | 9 | 1 | Online | 1,000 |
| Angus Reid | November 21–22, 2012 | | 29 | 47 | 9 | 12 | 2 | Online | 800 |
| Angus Reid | October 9–10, 2012 | | 26 | 49 | 7 | 16 | 2 | Online | 800 |
| Justason Market Intelligence | September 24 – October 1, 2012 | | 28 | 48 | 13 | 9 | 1 | Telephone/online | 539 |
| Ipsos Reid | September 11–18, 2012 | | 32 | 49 | 6 | 12 | 1 | Online | 1,006 |
| Angus Reid | September 10–11, 2012 | | 25 | 46 | 8 | 19 | 1 | Online | 800 |
| Environics | August 29–31, 2012 | | 25.4 | 44.8 | 7.8 | 19.8 | 2.2 | Online | 854 |
| Forum Research | August 30, 2012 | | 23 | 45 | 10 | 20 | 2 | IVR | 902 |
| Angus Reid | July 30 – August 1, 2012 | | 22 | 49 | 9 | 19 | 2 | Online | 804 |
| Forum Research | July 31, 2012 | | 23 | 49 | 9 | 18 | 2 | IVR | 1,064 |
| Angus Reid | July 3–5, 2012 | | 23 | 45 | 8 | 22 | 2 | Online | 801 |
| Forum Research | June 12, 2012 | | 20 | 50 | 11 | 19 | 0 | IVR | 1,014 |
| Ipsos Reid | June 5–11, 2012 | | 29 | 48 | 6 | 16 | 1 | Online | 1,026 |
| Angus Reid | May 7–9, 2012 | | 23 | 50 | 6 | 19 | 2 | Online | 802 |
| Forum Research | May 2, 2012 | | 23 | 48 | 8 | 19 | 1 | IVR | 1,054 |
| Forum Research | April 11, 2012 | | 23 | 46 | 8 | 23 | 1 | IVR | 1,069 |
| Angus Reid | March 29–30, 2012 | | 23 | 43 | 8 | 23 | 3 | Online | 800 |
| Forum Research | March 19, 2012 | | 21 | 47 | 9 | 21 | 2 | IVR | 1,063 |
| Mustel Group | March 5–19, 2012 | | 34 | 42 | 6 | 17 | 2 | Telephone | 518 |
| Justason Market Intelligence | February 24 – March 7, 2012 | | 31 | 45 | 8 | 14 | 2 | Telephone/online | 611 |
| Forum Research | February 22, 2012 | | 24 | 42 | 10 | 22 | 2 | IVR | 858 |
| NRG Research Group | February 7–12, 2012 | | 36 | 42 | 10 | 13 | | Telephone | 600 |
| Ipsos Reid | February 1–5, 2012 | | 32 | 44 | 7 | 16 | 2 | Online | 1,000 |
| Angus Reid | January 27–29, 2012 | | 28 | 42 | 10 | 19 | 1 | Online | 800 |
| Forum Research | January 23, 2012 | | 26 | 39 | 9 | 22 | 4 | IVR | 988 |
| Forum Research | December 15, 2011 | | 23 | 34 | 15 | 23 | 5 | IVR | 1,045 |
| Oraclepoll Research | November 22–25, 2011 | | 25 | 44 | 16 | 15 | | Telephone | 600 |
| Angus Reid | October 31 – November 1, 2011 | | 31 | 40 | 8 | 18 | 3 | Online | 803 |
| Ipsos Reid | September 28 – October 3, 2011 | | 38 | 45 | 6 | 12 | 3 | Online | 1,000 |
| Mustel Group | May 4–15, 2011 | | 37 | 35 | 9 | 18 | 1 | Telephone | 500 |
| Ipsos Reid | May 9–13, 2011 | | 41 | 39 | 8 | 10 | 2 | Telephone/online | 1,200 |
| Angus Reid | March 16–17, 2011 | | 43 | 38 | 10 | 5 | 4 | Online | 807 |
| Angus Reid | February 15–17, 2011 | | 41 | 38 | 11 | 4 | 6 | Online | 811 |
| Angus Reid | December 20–21, 2010 | | 38 | 38 | 12 | 7 | 5 | Online | 806 |
| Mustel Group | December 3–12, 2010 | | 41 | 36 | 15 | 7 | 2 | Telephone | 500 |
| Angus Reid | December 7–8, 2010 | | 36 | 36 | 14 | 6 | 8 | Online | 804 |
| Mustel Group | November 4–15, 2010 | | 37 | 42 | 10 | 9 | 3 | Telephone | 502 |
| Angus Reid | November 2–3, 2010 | | 26 | 47 | 10 | 10 | 7 | Online | 807 |
| Angus Reid | October 13–14, 2010 | | 24 | 49 | 13 | 8 | 6 | Online | 804 |
| Angus Reid | September 8–9, 2010 | | 25 | 48 | 13 | 8 | 6 | Online | 805 |
| Mustel Group | August 26 – September 7, 2010 | | 33 | 42 | 12 | 11 | 2 | Telephone | 502 |
| Angus Reid | July 26–28, 2010 | | 27 | 48 | 13 | 6 | 6 | Online | 800 |
| Angus Reid | July 6–8, 2010 | | 23 | 46 | 14 | 8 | 9 | Online | 801 |
| Angus Reid | June 1–6, 2010 | | 26 | 46 | 14 | 8 | | Online | 1,612 |
| Mustel Group | May 6–16, 2010 | | 32 | 44 | 13 | 7 | 3 | Telephone | 500 |
| Angus Reid | April 12–14, 2010 | | 29 | 47 | 14 | 5 | | Online | 800 |
| Angus Reid | March 15–17, 2010 | | 35 | 43 | 13 | 6 | | Online | 905 |
| Mustel Group | November 9–19, 2009 | | 35 | 43 | 15 | 5 | 2 | | 500 |
| Angus Reid | November 10–11, 2009 | | 33 | 47 | 10 | 7 | | Online | 800 |
| Ipsos Reid | September 9–13, 2009 | | 35 | 45 | 13 | | 7 | Telephone | 800 |
| Angus Reid | September 1–3, 2009 | | 31 | 45 | 11 | 7 | | Online | 783 |
| Mustel Group | August 5–11, 2009 | | 38 | 46 | 12 | 2 | 4 | | 500 |
| Angus Reid | July 31 – August 2, 2009 | | 34 | 42 | 12 | 7 | 5 | Online | 805 |
| 2009 election | May 12, 2009 | – | 45.82 | 42.15 | 8.21 | 2.10 | 1.72 | Ballot | 1,640,542 |
