= Comox Valley (provincial electoral district) =

Defunct provincial electoral district in British Columbia, Canada

Comox Valley was a provincial electoral district for the Legislative Assembly of British Columbia, Canada. Most of it is now in Courtenay-Comox.

Since the 1986 BC general election, the riding has been a bellwether, having voted consistently for a governing MLA.

== Demographics ==
Population, 2001	55,314
Population change 1996–2001	0.7%
Area (km^{2})	1,703.39
Population density (people per km^{2})	32

== History ==
This district was formed prior to the 1991 election.

== Members of the Legislative Assembly ==
Don McRae of the Liberal Party was elected MLA of the district in the 2009 provincial general election. He was re-elected in the 2013 election.

Comox Valley
Assembly	Years	Member	Party
Riding created from Comox
35th	1991–1996	Margaret Lord	New Democratic
36th	1996–2001	Evelyn Gillespie	New Democratic
37th	2001–2005	Stan Hagen	Liberal
38th	2005–2009	Stan Hagen	Liberal
39th	2009–2013	Don McRae	Liberal
40th	2013–2017	Don McRae	Liberal
Riding dissolved into Courtenay-Comox and Mid Island-Pacific Rim

== Election results ==
2013 British Columbia general election
Party	Candidate	Votes	%
Liberal	Don McRae	14,248	44.27
New Democratic	Kassandra Dycke	12,480	38.77
Green	Chris Aikman	3,718	11.55
Conservative	Diane Hoffmann	1,740	5.41
Total valid votes		32,186	100.00
Total rejected ballots		99	0.31
Turnout		32,285	63.99
Source: Elections BC

2009 British Columbia general election
Party	Candidate	Votes	%	Expenditures
Liberal	Don McRae	13,886	47	$92,892
New Democratic	Leslie McNabb	12,508	43	$123,151
Green	Hazel Lennox	2,577	9	$3,370
Refederation	Paula Berard	266	0.9	$360
People's Front	Barbara Biley	120	0.4	$256
Total valid votes		29,357		
Total rejected ballots		141	0.5	
Turnout		29,498	61	
http://www.elections.bc.ca/docs/rpt/2009GE/CMX.pdf

2005 British Columbia general election
Party	Candidate	Votes	%
Liberal	Stan Hagen	13,120	45.79
New Democratic	Andrew Black	12,384	43.22
Green	Chris Aikman	2,587	9.03
Marijuana	Miracle Emery	199	0.69
Democratic Reform	Don Davis	176	0.61
Work Less	Bruce O'Hara	75	0.26
Refederation	Mel Garden	61	0.21
People's Front	Barbara Biley	49	0.17
Total		28,651	100.00

B.C. General Election 2001: Comox Valley
Party	Candidate	Votes	%	±	Expenditures
Liberal	Stan Hagen	15,569	56.32%		$61,366
NDP	Evelyn Gillespie	5,356	19.37%		$23,476
Green	Pam Munroe	5,170	18.70%	–	$9,007
Marijuana	Sylvain Luc Beaudoin	873	3.16%		$80
Unity	John William Robinson	677	2.45%		
Total valid votes		27,645	100.00%		
Total rejected ballots		57	0.21%		
Turnout		27,702	74.81%		

B.C. General Election 1996: Comox Valley
Party	Candidate	Votes	%	±	Expenditures
NDP	Evelyn Gillespie	13,230	42.76%		$38,658
Liberal	Bill MacDonald	10,721	34.65%		$47,322
Reform	Delbert Doll	3,451	11.15%		$12,385
Progressive Democrat	Joe Lawlor	1,039	3.36%	–	$100
Green	Meaghan Cursons	1,296	4.19%	–	$1,766
Independent	Alicia Burns	598	1.93%		$8,325
Family Coalition	John Krell	398	1.29%	–	$1,943
Independent	Angus Ramsey	149	0.48%		$924
Independent	Hillel Alan Wright	57	0.18%		
Total valid votes		30,939	100.00%		
Total rejected ballots		115	0.37%		
Turnout		31,054	72.86%		

B.C. General Election 1991: Comox Valley
Party	Candidate	Votes	%	±	Expenditures
NDP	Margaret Lord	10,355	39.20%		$40,813
Liberal	Alicia Burns	8,754	33.14%		$14,805
Social Credit	Stan Hagen	6,734	25.49%	–	$68,780
Green	Richard P. R. Porter	432	1.63%	–	$1,407
Green Go	Hillel A. Wright	93	0.35%		
Independent	Daniel J. Downer	49	0.19%		$363
Total valid votes		26,417	100.00%		
Total rejected ballots		430	1.60%		
Turnout		26,847	78.26%		

== See also ==
- List of British Columbia provincial electoral districts
- Canadian provincial electoral districts
