= Margaret Lord =

Canadian politician

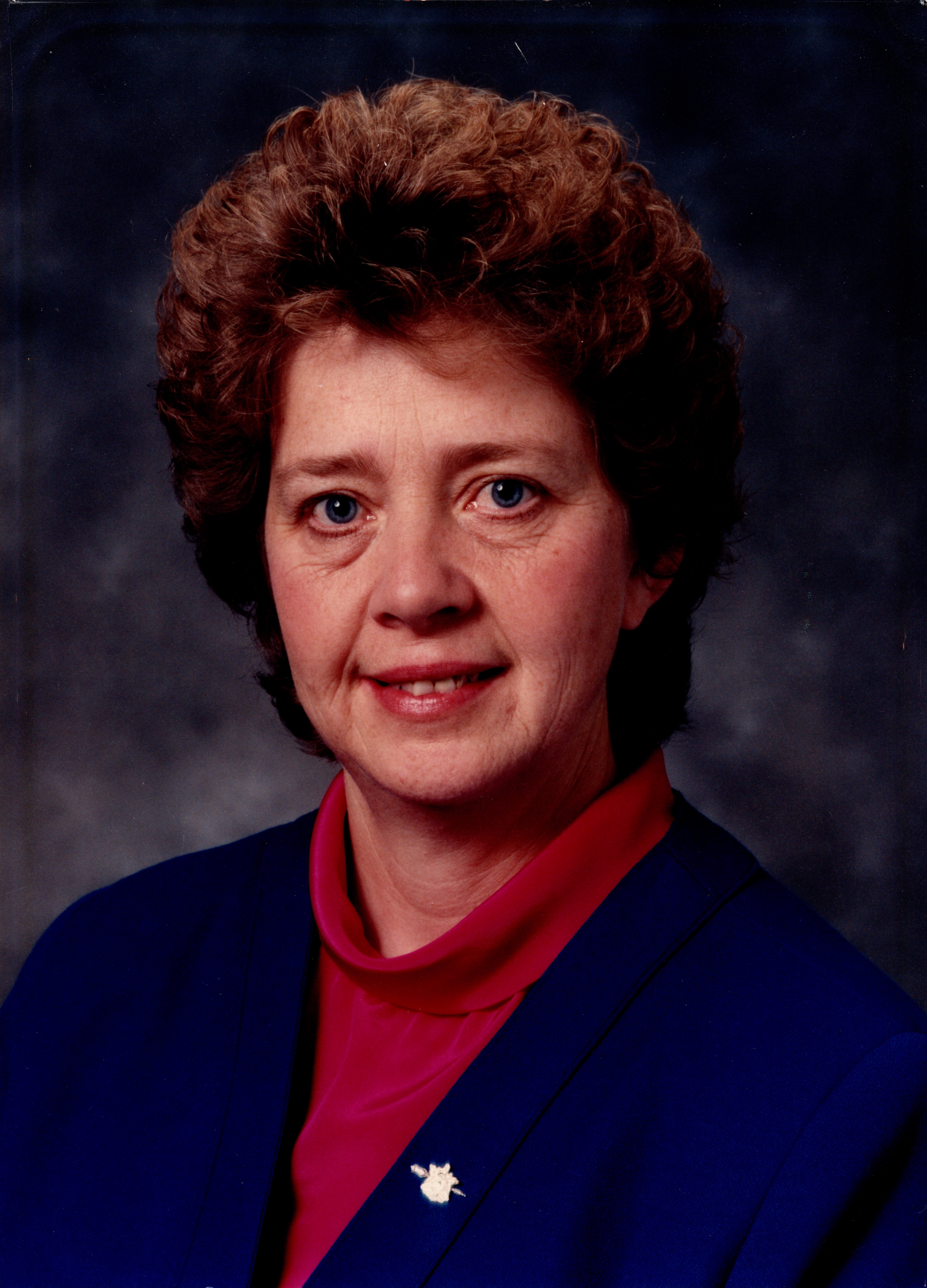

MLA for Comox Valley
- In office 1991–1996

Personal details
- Born: August 11, 1948 (age 77) Victoria, British Columbia
- Party: British Columbia New Democratic Party

Margaret Lord (born August 11, 1948) was a Canadian politician. She served in the Legislative Assembly of British Columbia from 1991 to 1996, as a NDP member for the constituency of Comox Valley.
