= Don McRae (politician) =

Canadian politician

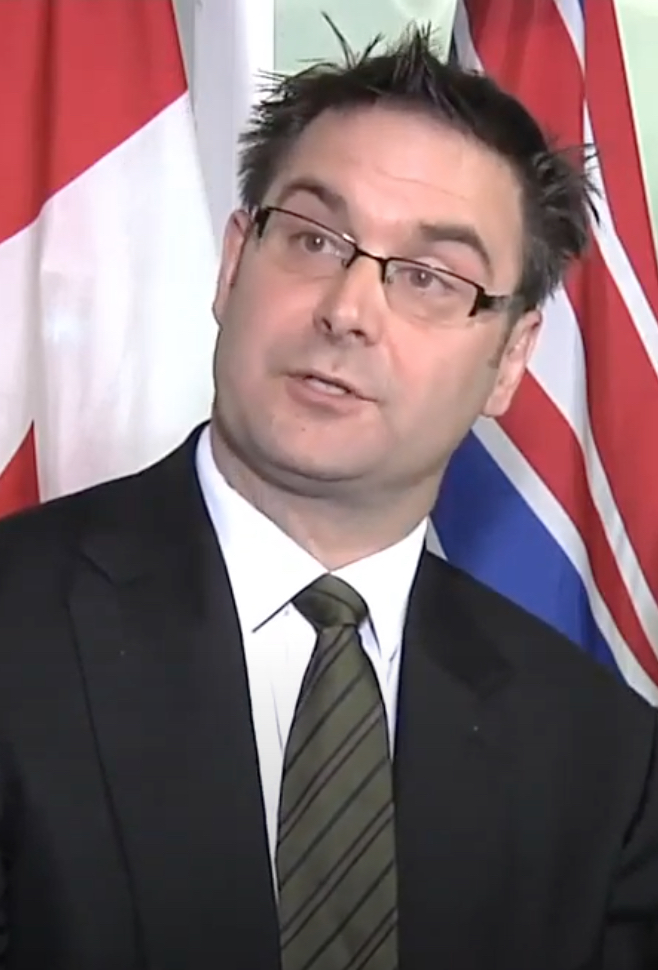

Member of the British Columbia Legislative Assembly for Comox Valley
- In office May 12, 2009 – May 9, 2017
- Preceded by: Stan Hagen
- Succeeded by: Ronna-Rae Leonard

Minister of Agriculture of British Columbia
- In office March 14, 2011 – September 5, 2012
- Premier: Christy Clark
- Preceded by: Ben Stewart
- Succeeded by: Norm Letnick

Minister of Education of British Columbia
- In office September 5, 2012 – June 7, 2013
- Premier: Christy Clark
- Preceded by: George Abbott
- Succeeded by: Peter Fassbender

Minister of Social Development and Social Innovation of British Columbia
- In office June 10, 2013 – February 2, 2015
- Premier: Christy Clark
- Succeeded by: Michelle Stilwell

Personal details
- Born: 1969 or 1970 (age 56–57) Comox Valley, British Columbia
- Party: Liberal
- Other political affiliations: BC Liberal
- Spouse: Deanne
- Children: Gracie, Chloe
- Occupation: Real Estate Agent

Don McRae (born 1969 or 1970) is a Former Member of the Legislative Assembly of British Columbia, Canada, and a member of the BC Liberal Party. He was elected to the Legislative Assembly from the riding of Comox Valley in the 2009 provincial election. After serving nearly 2 years on the backbenches he was appointed Minister of Agriculture on March 14, 2011, in Premier Christy Clark's first cabinet. On September 5, 2012, he was appointed as the Minister of Education. In addition to his ministerial roles, he sat on the Environment and Land Use Committee and the Cabinet Committee on Open Government and Engagement. He introduced one piece of legislation, the Prevention of Cruelty to Animals Amendment Act, 2011.

Prior to working in the provincial government, McRae worked as a secondary school teacher at Georges P. Vanier Secondary School. He spent seven years on Courtenay's city council, having successfully run in the 2002, 2005, and 2008 municipal elections. He was appointed as a director to the Comox-Strathcona Regional District and later the Comox Valley Regional District.

== Background ==
Don McRae was born and raised in the Comox Valley. He graduated from Georges P. Vanier Secondary School and went to the University of British Columbia as well as San Diego State University where he graduated specializing in education and international relations. He moved back to Courtenay and worked as a teacher at Georges P. Vanier Secondary School from the mid-1990s until his election as a Member of the Legislative Assembly in 2009. Shortly after moving to Courtenay, he married a woman named Deanne. Together they had two daughters, one born in 2003 and the second in 2009.

McRae spent seven years on the Courtenay city council. He was first elected in November 2002 and was re-elected in 2005 and 2008. While on council he voted against allowing businesses to stay open late-night, supported surveillance cameras in public areas, and led an initiative to rename streets after specific, locally-significant people. He also supported work at establishing a walking/cycling trail across the Comox Valley, from the Town of Comox to Comox Lake. He was appointed to the Comox-Strathcona Regional District board of directors in 2006. As one of Courtenay's two Regional Directors, he supported the Vancouver Island Health Authority's controversial attempt to build a new regional hospital near Dove Creek, but he later supported a compromised position that would see a new hospital built in the Comox Valley with the Campbell River hospital remaining open for emergency and acute care. McRae disliked how the Comox-Strathcona Regional District operated, calling the urban-rural voting blocks "dysfunctional". He favoured an amalgamation of Courtenay, Cumberland, Comox, and several electoral areas to form a new regional government. McRae welcomed the province's move to split the Regional District (creating the Comox Valley Regional District and the Strathcona Regional District), and even supported a proposal to include the Comox Indian Band on the Comox Valley Regional District's Board of Directors.

== Provincial politics ==
After Comox Valley MLA Stan Hagen suddenly died of a heart attack in January 2009, the BC Liberal Party had to nominate someone new for the up-coming May 2009 general election. Along with McRae, 3 other people stood for the nomination: B.C. Shellfish Growers' Association executive director Roberta Stevenson, Salvation Army manager Shawn Wilson, Habitat for Humanity worker Jon Toogood, and Comox Valley Airport Commissioner Ken Dawson (though Dawson withdrew several weeks before the nomination vote). The vote was held on March 12, with 650 registered BC Liberal members and a preferential voting system, and McRae won the nomination on the third ballot. Campaigning for the May general election began soon afterwards where he faced BC NDP candidate and log scaler Leslie McNabb, BC Green Party candidate and author Hazel Lennox, BC Refederation Party and forest industry administrator Paula Berard, and People's Front candidate and health-care worker Barbara Biley. The riding was predicted to have a very competitive race and was "too close to call". McRae was supported by Minister of Finance and fellow BC Liberal Colin Hansen who visited Courtenay to attend a McRae campaign event. McRae was criticized in the campaign for failing to attend a debate on Education. McRae won the riding with 47% of the vote in the 39th general election with his BC Liberal Party forming the government after winning 49 of province's 85 seats.

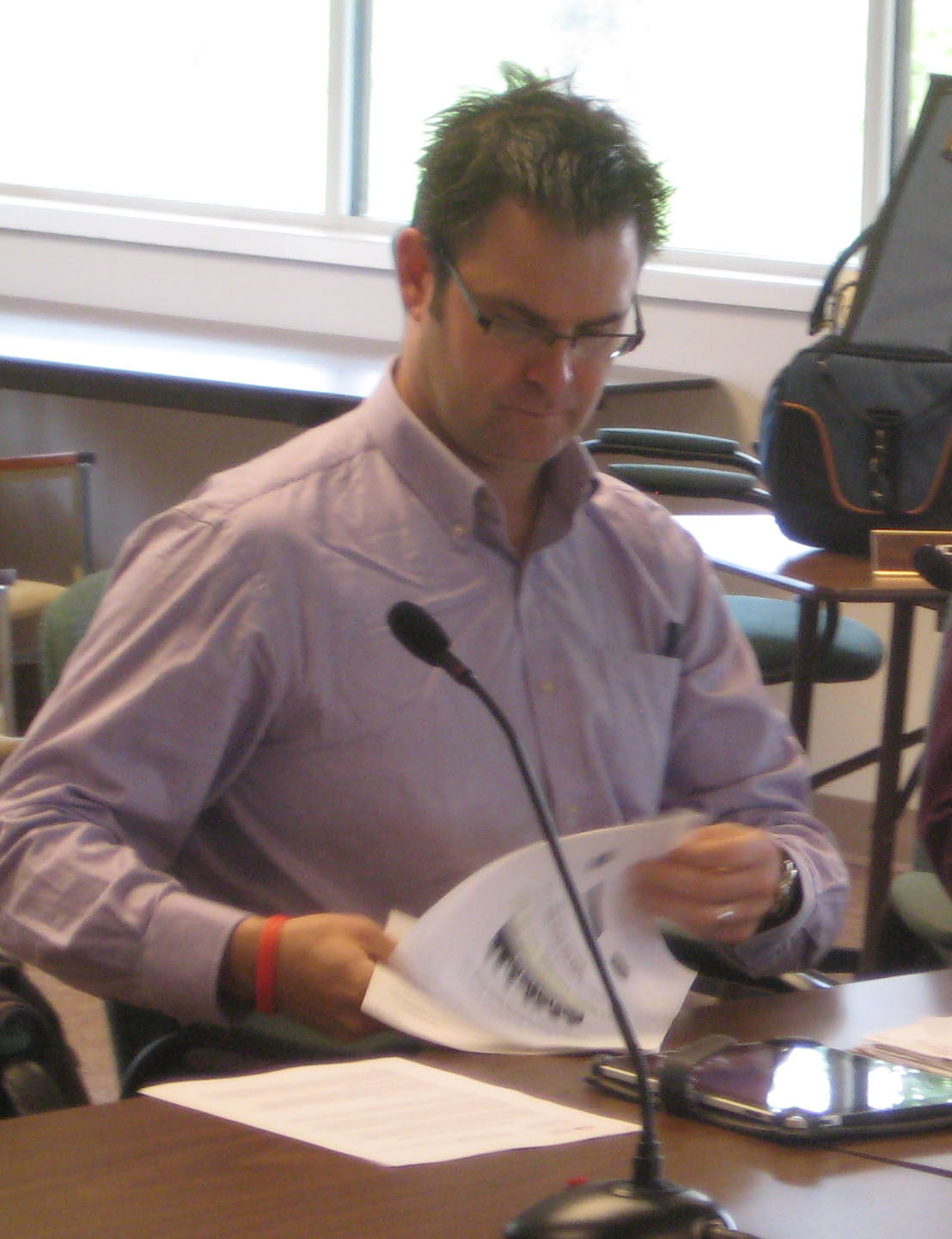
Don McRae, Minister of Agriculture

As the 39th Parliament of British Columbia began, McRae was not selected for the Executive Council by Premier Gordon Campbell. McRae was assigned to three parliamentary committees: Select Standing Committee on Finance and Government Services, Select Standing Committee on Aboriginal Affairs, and the Select Standing Committee on Health. In the parliament's second session he was also assigned to the Select Standing Committee on Children and Youth. McRae defended the government budget presented in September 2009 but was disappointed it ran a deficit, blaming an unexpected drop in revenue. Nonetheless, McRae was able to participate in government funding announcements, like $347,400 for ecosystem restoration at the Mount Washington Alpine Resort, and additional funds for sewer upgrades within his riding. As a member of the Select Standing Committee on Finance and Government Services which introduced the Harmonized Sales Tax McRae faced significant attention from the Fight HST group organized to oppose the tax. The group collected over 10,000 signatures from the Comox Valley riding on a petition opposing the HST and launched a recall initiative against McRae. McRae sought legal advice against the recall initiative which he claimed were spreading mis-information, specifically that the group was claiming 12,000 people in his riding had signed the petition against the HST, not 10,000 people. However, the effort to recall McRae eventually failed, having only collected 5,181 of the 19,000 signatures required. Despite McRae supporting the HST, tax payers provincially and in his own riding did not. The subsequent province-wide HST referendum resulted in 14,759 votes (53%) to extinguish the HST system in McRae's Comox Valley riding, with 55% province-wide voting to extinguish the HST.

During the BC Liberal Party leadership election to replace BC Liberal leader, and BC Premier, Gordon Campbell, McRae endorsed George Abbott in December. In March 2011, after Christy Clark won the leadership election and was named Premier, she included McRae into her Executive Council as Minister of Agriculture. Without a background in farming, McRae underwent a steep learning curve which involved travelling across the province to learn about the issues. As the minister responsible, McRae accepted the recommendations of the Sled Dog Task Force which investigated the slaughter of nearly 100 sled dogs in Whistler following a drop in tourism after the 2010 Winter Olympics. He followed through with the Prevention of Cruelty to Animals Amendment Act, 2011, which was introduced on May 11 and adopted on June 2. The amendment act increased potential fines to $75,000 and jail terms to two years for animal cruelty charges and extended the statute of limitations on such charges to three years.

In a minor cabinet shuffle, McRae, was promoted to Minister of Education on September 5, 2012.

After the Liberals won the 2013 provincial election, McRae returned to cabinet with the portfolio of Minister of Social Development and Social Innovation.

In February 2015, McRae tendered his resignation from Cabinet in order to deal with family matters. He is currently working again as a Vice Principal at Highland Secondary in Comox.

== Election history ==
2013 British Columbia general election: Comox Valley
Party	Candidate	Votes	%
Liberal	Don McRae	14,248	44.27
New Democratic	Kassandra Dycke	12,480	38.77
Green	Chris Aikman	3,718	11.55
Conservative	Diane Hoffmann	1,740	5.41
Total valid votes		32,186	100.00
Total rejected ballots		99	0.31
Turnout		32,285	63.99
Source: Elections BC

2009 British Columbia general election: Comox Valley
Party	Candidate	Votes	%	Expenditures
Liberal	Don McRae	13,886	47	$92,892
New Democratic	Leslie McNabb	12,508	43	$123,151
Green	Hazel Lennox	2,577	9	$3,370
Refederation	Paula Berard	266	0.9	$360
People's Front	Barbara Biley	120	0.4	$256
Total valid votes		29,357		
Total rejected ballots		141	0.5	
Turnout		29,498	61	
http://www.elections.bc.ca/docs/rpt/2009GE/CMX.pdf
