= Justason Market Intelligence =

Canadian public opinion and research company

Justason Market Intelligence is a Canadian public opinion and research company founded in 2003 by Barb Justason. The firm is located in Vancouver, British Columbia, Canada.

Justason Market Intelligence polled regularly in the lead-up to the November 2011 municipal election. The firm accurately predicted that incumbent Mayor Gregor Robertson would be returned to office. In the race between Mayor Gregor Robertson and challenger, Suzanne Anton, the firm's prediction was validated by election results.

== Specializations ==
=== Civic affairs ===
Justason Market Intelligence may be best known for its work in civic issues, including municipal politics and quality of life evaluations.

==== Municipal politics ====
In September 2010, a little more than a year before the November 2011 municipal elections, Justason Market Intelligence released the first of a series of regular polls of City of Vancouver residents regarding the performance of the mayor and municipal party support.

Justason Market Intelligence was the first polling firm to identify Non-partisan Association (NPA) Councillor Suzanne Anton as a potential candidate for mayor. Several months prior to announcing her candidacy and about a year prior to the November 2011 municipal elections, a Vancouver Courier story quotes the poll's written analysis: "In a scenario where Suzanne Anton is the NPA candidate for mayor, support for the NPA increases to 38 per cent while support for Vision, with Gregor Robertson the incumbent mayoral candidate, falls to 41 per cent--creating a statistical dead heat." Suzanne Anton declared her candidacy in May 2011.

==== Quality of Life ====
In September 2010, the firm released the first of several polls examining quality of life in Vancouver. The firm reported relatively high satisfaction among Vancouver residents, despite concerns about homelessness and housing affordability. The firm completed a larger scale quality-of-life study among Metro Vancouver residents in October 2011, which found 77% of residents satisfied with their local economy. The poll also found majorities of citizens satisfied with green space, schools and tap-water quality.

==== Community recreation and fitness services ====
In May 2011, Justason Market Intelligence completed a survey of Maple Ridge and Pitt Meadows residents about this region's parks and leisure services. The objectives of this research were to measure usage of and satisfaction with the parks and recreation programs and facilities provided by Maple Ridge and Pitt Meadows Department of Parks and Leisure Services. The research found that usage overall and overall performance assessments had remained stable since 2008; that volunteerism in the communities had increased.

The firm has completed other studies of leisure and recreation services in Metro Vancouver, including the North Vancouver Recreation Commission in 2004 and 2007.

=== Energy sector ===
Barb Justason, the firm's principal, began evaluating public opinion regarding B.C.'s offshore oil and gas potential in 2001, when the provincial government, under Premier Gordon Campbell, began exploring this opportunity.

In March 2012, Justason Market Intelligence released a poll demonstrating public opposition to tanker traffic through B.C.'s inside coastal waters, as proposed in the Enbridge Northern Gateway Pipelines proposal.

=== Waste management ===
Justason Market Intelligence completed qualitative and quantitative components of the Municipal Water and Waste Management Labour Market Study with ECO Canada. This study uncovered an aging workforce, shallow candidate pools for critical positions in this category, and employee retention challenges in water/wastewater treatment facilities.

== Affiliates ==
- Vancouver Focus™
- The Nanos Research Group
