= 2022 British Columbia Liberal Party leadership election =

Canadian provincial party election

- February 5, 2022
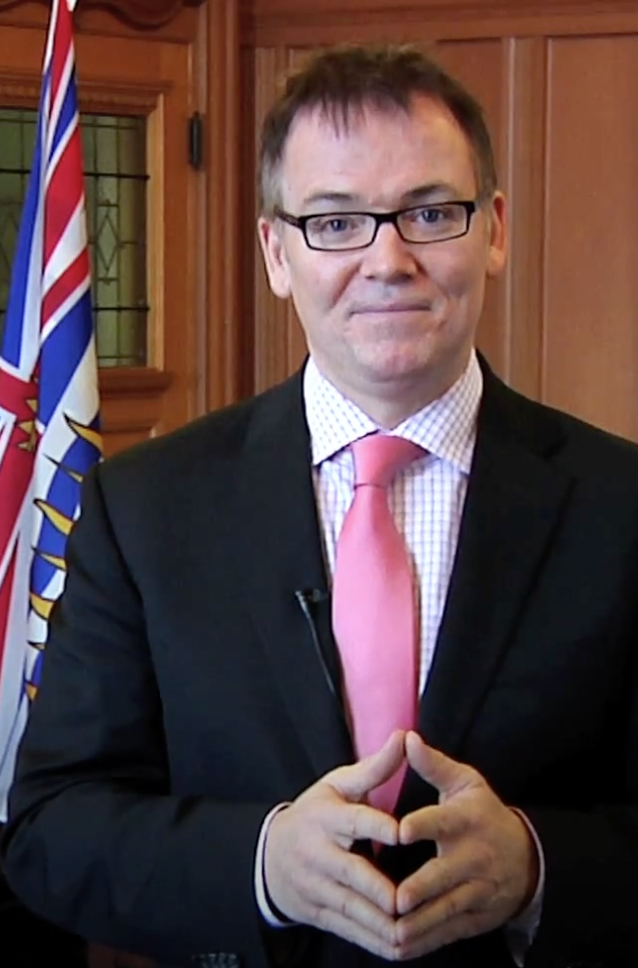

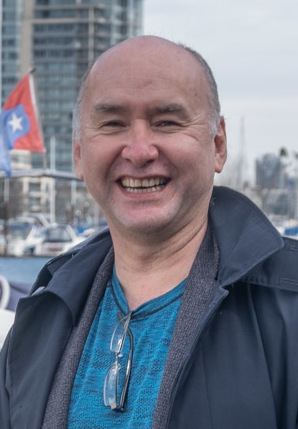

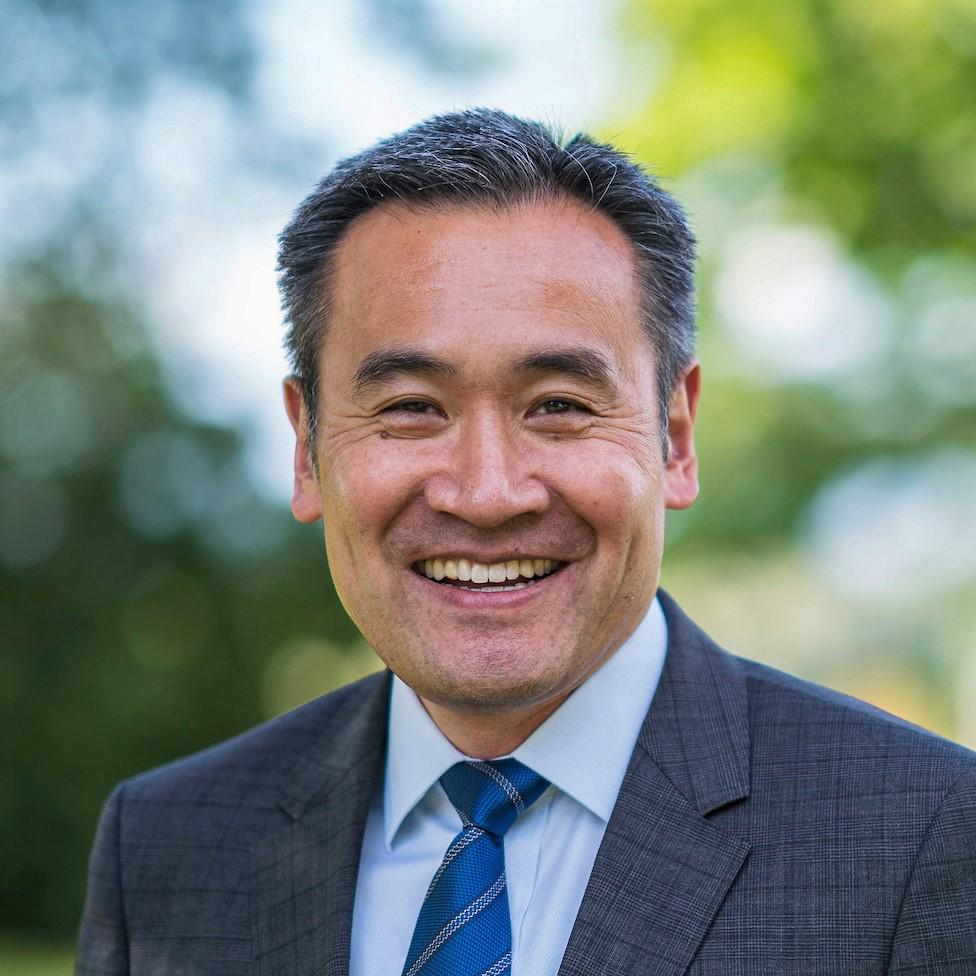
| Candidate | Kevin Falcon | Ellis Ross | Michael Lee |
| Last ballot points | 4541.35 (52.19%) | 2928.33 (33.65%) | 1230.31 (14.14%) |
| First ballot points | 4121 (47%) | 2325 (26.7%) | 899 (20.3%) |
Leader before election
Andrew Wilkinson
Elected Leader
Kevin Falcon

2022 British Columbia Liberal Party leadership election
- Date: February 5, 2022
- Resigning leader: Andrew Wilkinson
- Won by: Kevin Falcon
- Ballots: 5
- Candidates: 7
- Entrance fee: $45,000
- Spending limit: $600,000

A British Columbia Liberal Party leadership election was held on February 5, 2022, to elect a new party leader, following the resignation of Andrew Wilkinson after the 2020 British Columbia general election.

Kevin Falcon, who had previously been a minister in the government of Christy Clark until 2012 and an MLA until 2013, was declared the winner following the counting of the fifth ballot. He won with 18.54% of points over second-term MLA Ellis Ross, having already led on all previous ballots by large margins.

This was the last leadership election under the name "BC Liberal Party", as the party changed its name to "BC United" in April 2023.

== Background ==
On October 24, 2020, the 2020 British Columbia general election was held. The election was the Liberal Party's worst performance since the 1991 election, with the party falling from 41 to 28 seats and losing traditional strongholds in the Fraser Valley and the Okanagan. Two days after the election, Andrew Wilkinson announced that he would step down as leader.

On November 23, 2020, Shirley Bond was elected by party caucus members to serve as interim parliamentary leader. In a press conference held the following day, she said that the party would take some time to consider the election loss before launching its leadership contest. At that time, Bond suggested the contest would occur "not too late" in 2021, saying a period of introspection about the party's performance in the 2020 election and future direction were needed before a new leader is chosen. However, in February 2021, the leadership convention's date was set for February 5, 2022.

Interim party president Don Silversides explained that the race was set for 2022 in order to "attract the broadest possible range of candidates", and at a point when the COVID-19 pandemic should be under control. Wilkinson had remained the party leader until February 17, 2021, which allowed the party to schedule the election in February 2022 and still comply with a provision of the party constitution which requires a leadership election take place within a year of a resignation.

== Procedure and rules ==
The election was overseen by a seven-person organizing committee co-chaired by former Liberal cabinet minister Colin Hansen and Victoria lawyer Roxanne Helme. Other committee members included member of the Legislative Assembly (MLA) Jackie Tegart and former Prince George councillor Cameron Stolz.

Candidates were required to pay an application fee of $1,000 and candidate fees totalling $45,000. The campaign spending limit is $600,000.

The vote was held using weighted instant-runoff voting. Each provincial electoral district was worth 100 points, and points were allocated based on candidate rankings in the district.

In January 2022, it was reported that six of the candidates had lodged complaints with the party over concerns about fraudulent and ineligible memberships. Sources said as many as 24,000 members, representing about 60 percent of total members, did not comply with the party's eligibility criteria. Gavin Dew's campaign manager pointed to incomplete profiles, including typos in email addresses, wrong phone numbers, missing phone numbers or emails, and members sharing phone numbers or email addresses. Ellis Ross' campaign manager said door-to-door canvassers identified addresses where members were listed but did not appear to be living. The concerns led to a review by the party's organizing committee. Broadcaster and former MLA Jas Johal called the complaints a form of "structural and institutional racism", raising concerns that a review might disproportionately affect members of visible minorities. Kevin Falcon's campaign opposed the review, saying it would disfranchise members. In late January, the party's returning officer wrote to the leadership campaigns to advise that members would be given an opportunity to fix "genuine mistakes" on their membership applications. Four of the campaigns were critical of the decision, calling for a comprehensive audit.

On February 1, 2022, party member Vikram Bajwa filed a petition in the Supreme Court of British Columbia seeking to delay the announcement of results until the party released details of the membership audit. The hearing took place on February 4. The following afternoon, Justice Heather MacNaughton dismissed the petition, permitting the results to be released without a delay.

== Timeline ==
=== 2020 ===
- October 24 – The 2020 British Columbia general election was held.
- November 21 – Andrew Wilkinson resigned as leader of the opposition. A few days later, Shirley Bond was selected as the new leader of the opposition.

=== 2021 ===
- February 17 – Andrew Wilkinson formally resigns as party leader. Shirley Bond is appointed as interim leader.
- February 18 – Ellis Ross declared his candidacy.
- March 30 – Gavin Dew declared his candidacy.
- May 17 – Kevin Falcon declared his candidacy.
- June 9 – Michael Lee declared his candidacy.
- June 22 – Val Litwin declared his candidacy.
- August 2 – Renee Merrifield declared her candidacy.
- September 28 – First debate took place.
- November 22 – Second debate took place.
- November 24 – Stan Sipos declares his candidacy.
- November 30 – The candidate nomination deadline expired.
- December 14 – Third debate took place.
- December 17 – The membership deadline to be eligible to vote in the leadership election expired.

=== 2022 ===
- January 18 – Fourth debate took place.
- February 1 – Voter registration deadline expired.
- February 3 to 5 – Voting took place. On the evening of February 5, Kevin Falcon was declared the winner following the counting of the fifth ballot.

== Official candidates ==
=== Gavin Dew ===
Gavin Dew is a business person and served as the BC Liberal candidate in the 2016 by-election in Vancouver-Mount Pleasant.

Endorsements of Gavin Dew (1)
- Provincial and territorial politicians: (1)
  - Jordan Sturdy (MLA for West Vancouver-Sea to Sky)
- Total endorsements: 1

=== Kevin Falcon ===
Kevin Falcon is a former MLA for Surrey-Cloverdale (2001–2013), a former deputy premier of British Columbia, and the runner-up from the 2011 BC Liberal leadership election.

Endorsements of Kevin Falcon (15)
- Provincial and territorial politicians: (12)
  - Bruce Banman (MLA for Abbotsford South)
  - Mike Bernier (MLA for Peace River South and former minister of Education)
  - Doug Clovechok (MLA for Columbia River-Revelstoke) and BC Liberal caucus whip
  - Lorne Doerkson (MLA for Cariboo-Chilcotin)
  - Trevor Halford (MLA for Surrey-White Rock)
  - Karin Kirkpatrick (MLA for West Vancouver-Capilano)
  - Greg Kyllo (MLA for Shuswap)
  - Mike Morris (MLA for Prince George-Mackenzie, former minister of Public Safety and Solicitor General)
  - Coralee Oakes (MLA for Cariboo North)
  - Ian Paton (MLA for Delta South)
  - Todd Stone (MLA for Kamloops-South Thompson and former minister of Transportation and Infrastructure)
  - Teresa Wat (MLA for Richmond North Centre) and former British Columbia minister of International Trade
- Municipal politicians: (1)
  - Lori Ackerman, Mayor of Fort St. John
- Former municipal politicians: (1)
  - Dianne Watts (Former mayor of Surrey, MP for South Surrey—White Rock, and 2nd-place contestant in the 2018 leadership election). Campaign Co-Chair for Kevin Falcon.
- Former candidates: (1)
  - Puneet Sandhar, 2017 candidate in Surrey-Panorama. Campaign Co-Chair for Kevin Falcon.
- Total endorsements: 15

=== Michael Lee ===
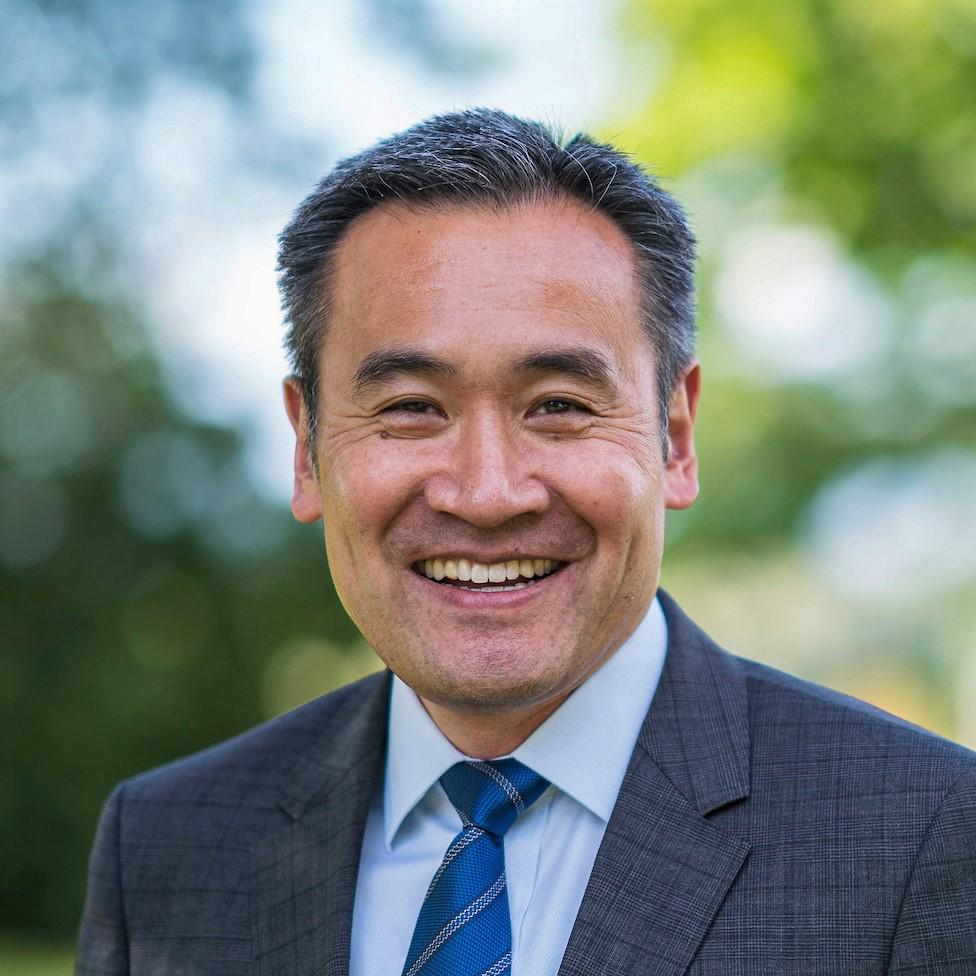
Michael Lee

Michael Lee was MLA for Vancouver-Langara and was the 3rd-place contestant in the 2018 leadership election. He is a lawyer, a former partner at Lawson Lundell LLP and was a special assistant to Progressive Conservative prime minister Kim Campbell. Lee previously served as the party's critic for Transportation, Infrastructure and TransLink, for Justice, and as co-critic for Indigenous Relations.

Endorsements of Michael Lee (1)
- Provincial and territorial politicians: (1)
  - Mike de Jong (MLA for Abbotsford-Mission)
- Total endorsements: 1

=== Ellis Ross ===
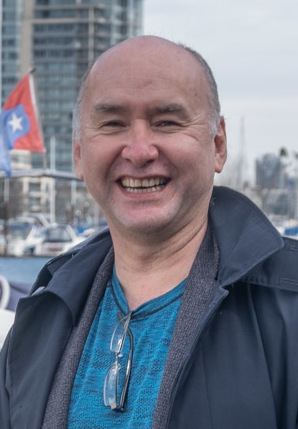
Ellis Ross

Ellis Ross was MLA for Skeena, a former chief councillor of the Haisla Nation and a recipient of the Order of British Columbia. In 2017, he served briefly as the minister of Natural Gas Development and Minister Responsible for Housing in the Christy Clark government, until the NDP and Greens defeated the government on a confidence vote several weeks after his appointment.

Endorsements of Ellis Ross (3)
- Provincial and territorial politicians: (3)
  - Dan Davies (MLA for Peace River North)
  - John Rustad (MLA for Nechako Lakes, former minister of Indigenous Relations and Reconciliation)
  - Tom Shypitka (MLA for Kootenay East)
- Total endorsements: 3

=== Val Litwin ===
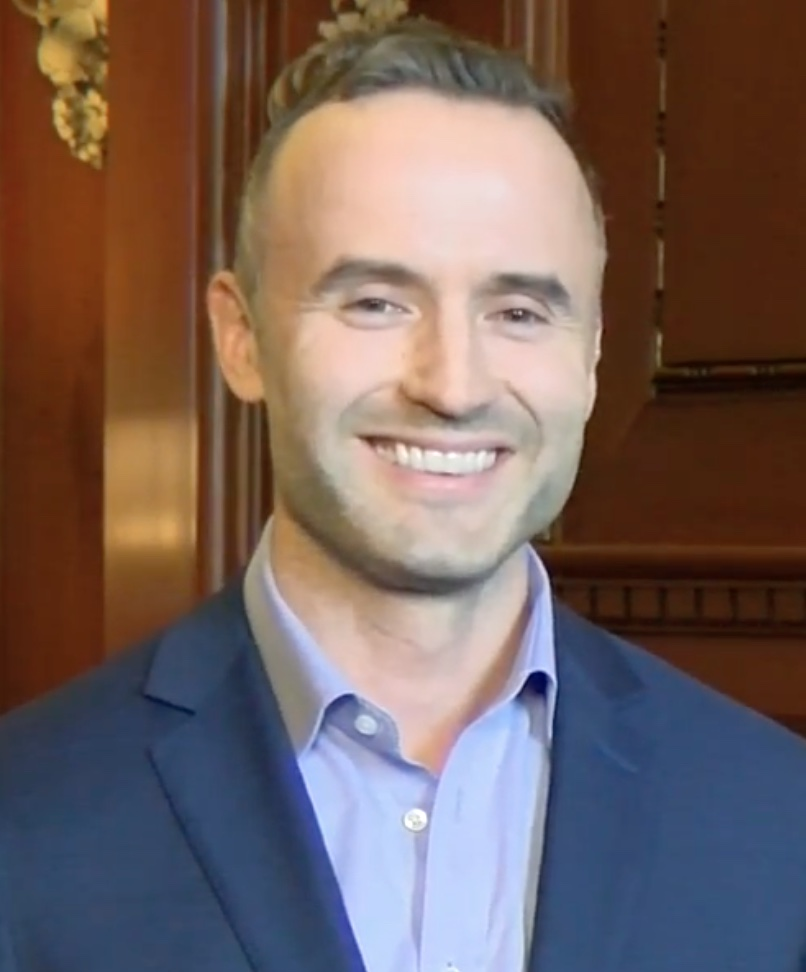
Val Litwin

Val Litwin is the former CEO of the British Columbia Chamber of Commerce.

=== Renee Merrifield ===
Renee Merrifield was MLA for Kelowna-Mission. Elected in October 2020, she served as the party's Critic for Health.

=== Stan Sipos ===
Stan Sipos is the president of Cielo Properties Inc.

== Rejected candidates ==
- Aaron Gunn, conservative political commentator, senior contributor for BC and Canada Proud

== Declined ==
- Mike Bernier, MLA for Peace River South (endorsed Falcon)
- Shirley Bond, interim party leader. Bond said she will not support any candidate.
- Mike de Jong, MLA for Abbotsford West, fifth-place contestant in the 2018 leadership election, former minister of Finance (endorsed Lee)
- Jas Johal, former MLA for Richmond-Queensborough, former Global BC journalist
- James Moore, former MP for Port Moody—Westwood—Port Coquitlam (2000–2015), former federal minister of Canadian Heritage (2008–2013) and minister of Industry (2013–2015)
- Mike Morris, MLA for Prince George-Mackenzie (endorsed Falcon)
- Tom Shypitka, MLA for Kootenay East, critic for Energy, Mines and Low Carbon Innovation (endorsed Ross)
- Todd Stone, MLA for Kamloops-South Thompson, fourth-place contestant in the 2018 leadership election, former minister of Transportation and Infrastructure (endorsed Falcon)
- Tamara Taggart, former CTV Vancouver news anchor, 2019 Liberal Party of Canada candidate for Vancouver Kingsway
- Dianne Watts, runner-up in the 2018 leadership election, former MP for South Surrey—White Rock (2015–2017), former mayor (2005–2015) and councillor (1996–2005) of Surrey (endorsed Falcon)
- Brad West, mayor of Port Coquitlam

== Results ==
Kevin Falcon was declared the winner following the counting of the fifth ballot. Ellis Ross had the second-highest score, and Michael Lee the third. All other candidates were eliminated prior to the fifth ballot. The party announced the following results on February 5, 2022, via a Facebook live stream:

= Eliminated from next round
= Winner

| Candidate | Ballot 1 | | Ballot 2 | | Ballot 3 | | Ballot 4 | | Ballot 5 | |
| Name | Points | Percent | Points | Percent | Points | Percent | Points | Percent | Points | Percent |
|---|---|---|---|---|---|---|---|---|---|---|
| Kevin Falcon | 4121 | 47% | 4143 | 47.6% | 4202.36 | 48.3% | 4318.14 | 49.63% | 4541.35 | 52.19% |
| Ellis Ross | 2325 | 26.7% | 2355.9 | 27.1% | 2493.1 | 28.66% | 2714.50 | 31.2% | 2928.33 | 33.65% |
| Michael Lee | 899 | 10.3% | 912.4 | 10.5% | 938.43 | 10.8% | 1039.37 | 11.94% | 1230.31 | 14.14% |
| Val Litwin | 504 | 5.8% | 517.9 | 5.95% | 536.17 | 6.16% | 627.97 | 7.21% | Eliminated | |
| Gavin Dew | 466 | 5.4% | 481.4 | 5.5% | 429.93 | 6.01% | Eliminated | | | |
| Renee Merrifield | 278 | 3.2% | 289 | 3.3% | Eliminated | | | | | |
| Stan Sipos | 104.6 | 1.2% | Eliminated | | | | | | | |
