= 35th Parliament of British Columbia =

Legislative assembly sitting, 1992–1996

The 35th Legislative Assembly of British Columbia sat from 1992 to 1996. The members were elected in the British Columbia general election held in October 1991. The New Democratic Party (NDP) led by Mike Harcourt formed the government. Harcourt resigned as premier in February 1996; Glen Clark became party leader and premier later that month. The Liberals led by Gordon Wilson formed the official opposition.

Joan Sawicki served as speaker for the assembly until 1994 when Emery Barnes became speaker.

== Members of the 35th Parliament ==
The following members were elected to the assembly in 1991:

Member	Electoral district	Party	First elected / previously elected	No.# of term(s)
Harry de Jong	Abbotsford	Social Credit	1986	2nd term
John van Dongen (1995)	Abbotsford	Liberal	1995	1st term
Gerard A. Janssen	Alberni	NDP	1988	2nd term
Jackie Pement	Bulkley Valley-Stikine	NDP	1991	1st term
Fred G. Randall	Burnaby-Edmonds	NDP	1991	1st term
James Barry Jones	Burnaby North	NDP	1986	2nd term
Joan Sawicki	Burnaby-Willingdon	NDP	1991	1st term
Frank Garden	Cariboo North	NDP	1991	1st term
David Zirnhelt	Cariboo South	NDP	1989	2nd term
Robert Chisholm	Chilliwack	Liberal	1991	1st term
Robert Chisholm	Chilliwack	Independent	1991	1st term
Jim Doyle	Columbia River-Revelstoke	NDP	1991	1st term
Margaret Lord	Comox Valley	NDP	1991	1st term
John Massey Cashore	Coquitlam-Maillardville	NDP	1986	2nd term
Jan Pullinger	Cowichan-Ladysmith	NDP	1989	2nd term
Norm Lortie	Delta North	NDP	1991	1st term
Fred Gingell	Delta South	Liberal	1991	1st term
Moe Sihota	Esquimalt-Metchosin	NDP	1986	2nd term
Gary Farrell-Collins	Fort Langley-Aldergrove	Liberal	1991	1st term
Arthur L. Charbonneau	Kamloops	NDP	1991	1st term
Frederick H. Jackson	Kamloops-North Thompson	NDP	1991	1st term
Kathleen Anne Edwards	Kootenay	NDP	1986	2nd term
Lynn Stephens	Langley	Liberal	1991	1st term
Rick F.G. Kasper	Malahat-Juan de Fuca	NDP	1991	1st term
Bill Hartley	Maple Ridge-Pitt Meadows	NDP	1991	1st term
Peter A. Dueck	Matsqui	Social Credit	1986	2nd term
Peter A. Dueck	Matsqui	Independent	1986	2nd term
Michael G. de Jong (1994)	Matsqui	Liberal	1994	1st term
Dennis Streifel	Mission-Kent	NDP	1991	1st term
Dale Lovick	Nanaimo	NDP	1986	2nd term
Corky Evans	Nelson-Creston	NDP	1991	1st term
Anita Hagen	New Westminster	NDP	1986	2nd term
A. Dan Miller	North Coast	NDP	1986	2nd term
Colin S. Gabelmann	North Island	NDP	1972, (Note: North Vancouver-Seymour) 1979	5th term*
David D. Schreck	North Vancouver-Lonsdale	NDP	1991	1st term
Daniel Jarvis	North Vancouver-Seymour	Liberal	1991	1st term
Elizabeth Cull	Oak Bay-Gordon Head	NDP	1989	2nd term
N.L. (Bill) Barlee	Okanagan-Boundary	NDP	1988	2nd term
Judi K. Tyabji	Okanagan East	Liberal	1991	1st term
Judi K. Tyabji	Okanagan East	Independent	1991	1st term
Judi K. Tyabji	Okanagan East	Progressive Democratic Alliance	1991	1st term
Jim Beattie	Okanagan-Penticton	NDP	1991	1st term
Lyall Franklin Hanson	Okanagan-Vernon	Social Credit	1986	2nd term
Lyall Franklin Hanson	Okanagan-Vernon	Reform	1986	2nd term
Clifford J. Serwa	Okanagan West	Social Credit	1986	2nd term
Leonard Krog	Parksville-Qualicum	NDP	1991	1st term
Richard Neufeld	Peace River North	Social Credit	1991	1st term
Richard Neufeld	Peace River North	Reform	1991	1st term
Jack S. Weisgerber	Peace River South	Social Credit	1986	2nd term
Jack S. Weisgerber	Peace River South	Reform	1986	2nd term
Michael C. Farnworth	Port Coquitlam	NDP	1991	1st term
Barbara E. Copping	Port Moody-Burnaby Mountain	NDP	1991	1st term
Gordon F. Wilson	Powell River-Sunshine Coast	Liberal	1991	1st term
Gordon F. Wilson	Powell River-Sunshine Coast	Progressive Democratic Alliance	1991	1st term
Lois R. Boone	Prince George-Mount Robson	NDP	1986	2nd term
Paul Ramsey	Prince George North	NDP	1991	1st term
Len Fox	Prince George-Omineca	Social Credit	1991	1st term
Len Fox	Prince George-Omineca	Reform	1991	1st term
Douglas Symons	Richmond Centre	Liberal	1991	1st term
Linda Reid	Richmond East	Liberal	1991	1st term
Allan Warnke	Richmond-Steveston	Liberal	1991	1st term
Allan Warnke	Richmond-Steveston	Independent	1991	1st term
Ed Conroy	Rossland-Trail	NDP	1991	1st term
Clive Tanner	Saanich North and the Islands	Liberal	1991	1st term
Andrew Petter	Saanich South	NDP	1991	1st term
Shannon O'Neill	Shuswap	NDP	1991	1st term
Helmut Giesbrecht	Skeena	NDP	1991	1st term
Ken Jones	Surrey-Cloverdale	Liberal	1991	1st term
Sue Hammell	Surrey-Green Timbers	NDP	1991	1st term
Penny Priddy	Surrey-Newton	NDP	1991	1st term
Joan K. Smallwood	Surrey-Whalley	NDP	1986	2nd term
Wilf Hurd	Surrey-White Rock	Liberal	1991	1st term
Emery O. Barnes	Vancouver-Burrard	NDP	1972	6th term
Bernie Simpson	Vancouver-Fairview	NDP	1991	1st term
Joy K. McPhail	Vancouver-Hastings	NDP	1991	1st term
Ujjal Dosanjh	Vancouver-Kensington	NDP	1991	1st term
Glen Clark	Vancouver-Kingsway	NDP	1986	2nd term
Val J. Anderson	Vancouver-Langara	Liberal	1991	1st term
Tom Perry	Vancouver-Little Mountain	NDP	1989	2nd term
Mike Harcourt	Vancouver-Mount Pleasant	NDP	1986	2nd term
Darlene R. Marzari	Vancouver-Point Grey	NDP	1986	2nd term
Art Cowie	Vancouver-Quilchena	Liberal	1991	1st term
Gordon Campbell (1994)	Vancouver-Quilchena	Liberal	1994	1st term
Gretchen Brewin	Victoria-Beacon Hill	NDP	1991	1st term
Robin Blencoe	Victoria-Hillside	NDP	1983	3rd term
Robin Blencoe	Victoria-Hillside	Independent	1983	3rd term
Jeremy Dalton	West Vancouver-Capilano	Liberal	1991	1st term
David J. Mitchell	West Vancouver-Garibaldi	Liberal	1991	1st term
David J. Mitchell	West Vancouver-Garibaldi	Independent	1991	1st term
Harry S. Lali	Yale-Lillooet	NDP	1991	1st term

== Party standings ==
Affiliation	Members
New Democratic	51
Liberal	17
Social Credit	7
Total	75
Government Majority	27

== By-elections ==
By-elections were held to replace members for various reasons:

Electoral district	Member elected	Party	Election date	Reason
Matsqui	Michael G. de Jong	Liberal	February 17, 1994	Peter A. Dueck resigned November 30, 1993
Vancouver-Quilchena	Gordon Campbell	Liberal	February 17, 1994	Art Cowie resigned November 9, 1993
Abbotsford	John van Dongen	Liberal	May 3, 1995	Harry de Jong resigned November 1, 1994

== Other changes ==
- Peter Dueck became an Independent on February 7, 1992. He resigns his seat on November 30, 1993.
- David J. Mitchell resigns from the Liberal caucus to become an Independent Liberal on December 7, 1992. He resigns from the Liberals on to become an Independent on February 16, 1994. He resigns his seat on March 26, 1996.
- Gordon Wilson and Judi Tyabji resign from the Liberals on September 11, 1993. On October 22 they form the Progressive Democratic Alliance.
- On March 14, 1994 Jack Weisgerber, Len Fox and Richard Neufeld join the Reform Party. They are joined by Lyall Hanson on May 11.
- Robert Chisholm became an Independent April 11, 1995.
- Robin Blencoe was expelled from the NDP caucus on April 4, 1995. He resigns from the NDP to become an Independent on December 29, 1995.
- Allan Warnke resigns from the Liberals to become an Independent April 28, 1996.
