= Abbotsford (provincial electoral district) =

Defunct provincial electoral district in British Columbia, Canada

British Columbia electoral district

Defunct provincial electoral district
- Legislature: Legislative Assembly of British Columbia
- District created: 1991
- First contested: 1991
- Last contested: 1996

Demographics
- Census division(s): Fraser Valley Regional District
- Census subdivision(s): Abbotsford, Chilliwack

Abbotsford was a provincial electoral district in British Columbia, Canada. It was first contested in the 1991 British Columbia General Election. The riding was formed from an amalgamation of parts of the formerly dual-member Central Fraser Valley and Chilliwack ridings.

== Members of the Legislative Assembly ==
Abbotsford
Assembly	Years	Member	Party
Riding created from Central Fraser Valley and Chilliwack
35th	1991–1995	Harry de Jong	Social Credit
35th	1995–1996	John van Dongen	Liberal
36th	1996–2001	John van Dongen	Liberal
Riding dissolved into Abbotsford-Clayburn, Chilliwack-Kent and Chilliwack-Sumas

== Electoral history ==
1996 British Columbia general election
Party	Candidate	Votes	%	±%
Liberal	John van Dongen	10,998	50.25	▲7.44
New Democratic	Bruce Temple	5,405	24.69	▲15.73
Reform	Mark Warawa	4,086	18.67	▼21.91
Progressive Democrat	Merilyn Anderson	1,126	5.14	▲2.15
Green	Geoff Berner	274	1.25	▲0.68
Total valid votes		21,889	100.00	
Total rejected ballots		72		
Liberal hold		Swing		+14.68

British Columbia provincial by-election, May 3, 1995 Resignation of Harry de Jong
Party	Candidate	Votes	%	±%
Liberal	John van Dongen	5,588	42.81	▲7.44
Reform	Bill Kilpatrick	5,297	40.58	New
New Democratic	Rollie Keith	1,170	8.96	▼19.55
Progressive Democrat	Cathy Goodfellow	391	3.00	New
Freedom	Kathleen F. Toth	201	1.54	New
Progressive Conservative	Kenneth D. Skilnick	171	1.31	New
Social Credit	Alan Levinson	161	1.23	▼34.89
Green	Michael Horn	75	0.57	New
Total valid votes		13,054	100.00	
Total rejected ballots		112		
Liberal gain from Social Credit		Swing		+21.17

1991 British Columbia general election
Party	Candidate	Votes	%
Social Credit	Harry de Jong	6,647	36.12
Liberal	Calvin Wickham	6,509	35.37
New Democratic	Shirley Cooke	5,246	28.51
Total valid votes		18,402	100.00
Total rejected ballots		437	

== See also ==
- List of British Columbia provincial electoral districts
- Canadian provincial electoral districts
