= Gavin Dew =

Canadian politician

The Honourable Gavin Dew MLA

Minister of Economic Development and Tourism of British Columbia
- Incumbent
- Assumed office November 20, 2026
- Premier: Lorne Doerkson
- Preceded by: Anne Kang (Tourism); Brenda Bailey (Economic Growth)

Member of the British Columbia Legislative Assembly for Kelowna-Mission
- Incumbent
- Assumed office October 19, 2024
- Preceded by: Renee Merrifield

Personal details
- Born: January 1, 1984 (age 42)
- Party: BC Conservative (2024–present)
- Other political affiliations: BC Liberal (before 2024); Non-Partisan Association (municipal)
- Spouse: Erin Shum
- Children: 2
- Education: University of British Columbia (BA); University of Oxford (MBA)

Gavin Dew MLA (born January 1, 1984) is a Canadian politician who has served as a member of the Legislative Assembly of British Columbia (MLA) representing the electoral district of Kelowna-Mission since 2024. He is a member of the Conservative Party.

== Early life and career ==
Dew was born and raised in British Columbia. He currently resides in Kelowna with his wife, Erin, and their two children. He first moved to Kelowna in 2023 when he opened Play Area, a childcare facility and indoor playground serving young families in the Okanagan, with his wife who has a background working with children on the autism spectrum. They previously operated a childcare centre in East Vancouver.

Dew holds a Bachelor of Arts in English literature from the University of British Columbia and an MBA from Oxford, specializing in corporate social responsibility. He is also deeply involved in his community serving on both boards of the Business Council of BC and Resource Works, an organization committed to responsible resource development. Dew was also the director of external relations at the Great Canadian Gaming Corporation. In addition, he has served in governance roles for organizations including the University of British Columbia, Kwantlen Polytechnic University, and Community Futures, a rural small business lender. Dew also volunteers as an advisor to Arthritis Canada and is the chair of the board for the Veterans Transition Network, which is a national mental health charity that played a crucial role evacuating Afghan interpreters who were at risk due to the Taliban.

Dew was named by Business in Vancouver a "Forty under 40" for his leadership and community efforts.

Dew's career has spanned two decades with experience in business, public policy, and technology. He has played roles in building public understanding for complex policies and projects across Canada on topics of affordable housing, energy infrastructure, and tech clusters. He recently served as Chief Strategy Officer for a $5 billion agricultural innovation and food security project in BC.

== Political career ==
Formerly a member of the BC Liberal Party, Dew was involved in the campaigns of Kevin Falcon and Michael Lee for party leadership in 2011 and 2018 respectively, and served as campaign manager for West Vancouver-Capilano member of the Legislative Assembly (MLA) Ralph Sultan in the 2013 provincial election. He was also a director of the Non-Partisan Association, a municipal political party in Vancouver.

After Jenny Kwan announced she would be resigning as MLA for Vancouver-Mount Pleasant to stand in the 2015 federal election, Dew was nominated as the Liberal candidate for the ensuing by-election, held on February 2, 2016; he came in third behind New Democratic Party candidate Melanie Mark and Green Party candidate Pete Fry. He also ran in the 2022 Liberal leadership election, where he was eliminated on the third ballot with 6.01% of the vote.

In August 2024, he secured the nomination BC Conservative candidate for Kelowna-Mission in August 2024 after also being approached by the BC NDP. He went on to win his seat in the Legislative Assembly of BC during that October's provincial election with 51.5% of the votes. Dew was named the opposition critic for jobs, economic development and innovation for the Conservative Party of BC's shadow cabinet in November 2024 where he currently serves.

== Electoral record ==
2026 British Columbia general election: Kelowna-Mission
Party	Candidate	Votes	%	±%	Expenditures
Conservative	Gavin Dew	14,572	58.33		
New Democratic	Miriam Rycroft	6,993	27.99		
Green	Saoirse MacKinnon	2,550	10.21		
OneBC	Abraham Nordine	825	3.30	—	
Total valid votes		24,940	99.84		
Total rejected ballots		40	0.16		
Turnout		24,980			
Registered voters					
Conservative hold		Swing		+6.02	
Source: Elections BC

2024 British Columbia general election: Kelowna-Mission
Party	Candidate	Votes	%	±%	Expenditures
Conservative	Gavin Dew	14,071	51.49	–	$65,434.45
New Democratic	Harpreet Badohal	8,913	32.61	+1.4	$15,920.83
Unaffiliated	Ashley Ramsay	2,996	10.96	–	$8,727.88
Green	Billy Young	1,349	4.94	-12.1	$0.00
Total valid votes/expense limit		27,329	99.84	–	$71,700.08
Total rejected ballots		43	0.16	–	
Turnout		27,372	60.00	–	
Registered voters		45,617			
Conservative notional gain from BC United		Swing		N/A (Note: Swing cannot be calculated as BC United did not run a candidate in this riding.)	
Source: Elections BC

British Columbia provincial by-election, February 2, 2016: Vancouver-Mount Pleasant Resignation of Jenny Kwan
Party	Candidate	Votes	%	±%	Expenditures
New Democratic	Melanie Mark	5,627	60.14	−5.69	$71,603
Green	Pete Fry	2,533	27.07	+15.16	$29,065
Liberal	Gavin Dew	1,056	11.29	−7.46	$66,547
Libertarian	Bonnie Boya Hu	79	0.84	–	$250
Your Political Party	Jeremy Gustafson	61	0.65	–	$454
Total valid votes		9,356	99.53	–	
Total rejected ballots		44	0.47	−0.51	
Turnout		9,400	23.17	−26.60	
Registered voters		40,561			
New Democratic hold		Swing		−10.42	

== See also ==
- 43rd Parliament of British Columbia
