= Steve Thomson (politician) =

Canadian politician

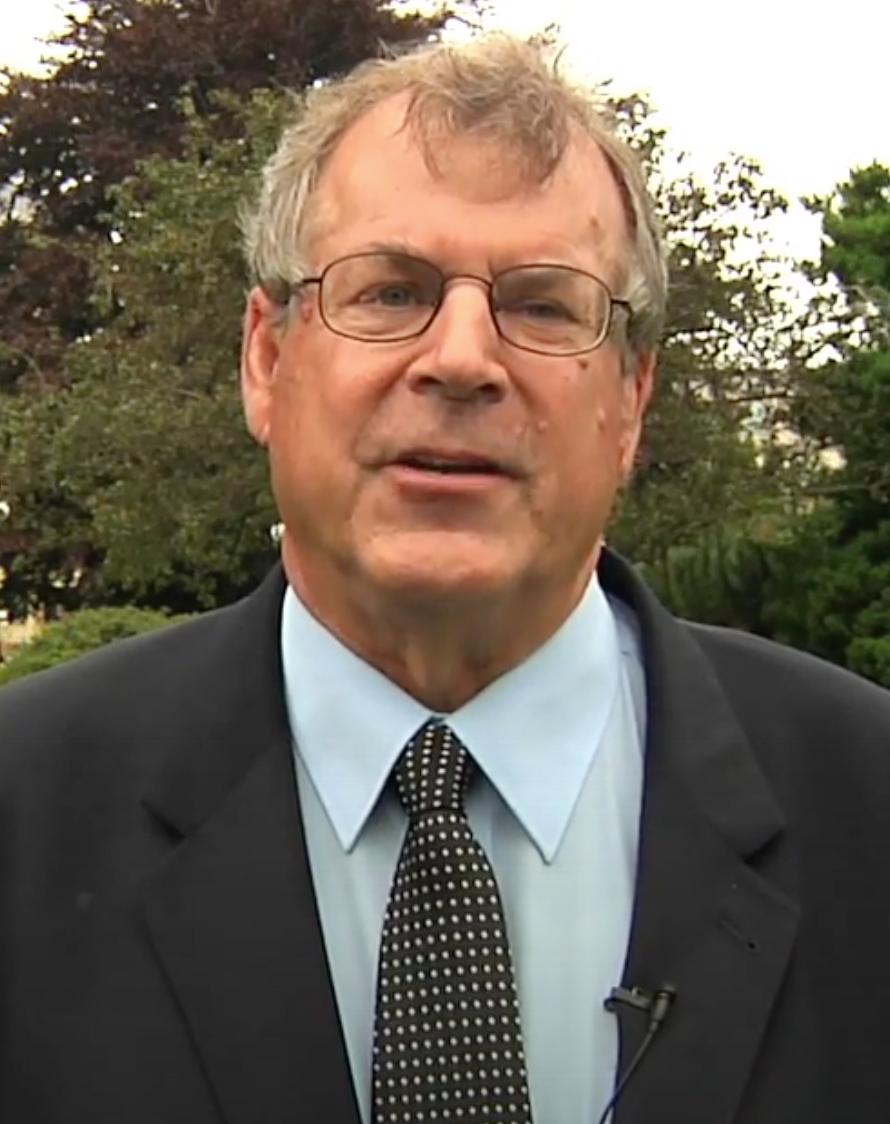

38th Speaker of the Legislative Assembly of British Columbia
- In office June 22, 2017 – June 29, 2017
- Preceded by: Linda Reid
- Succeeded by: Darryl Plecas

Member of the Legislative Assembly for Kelowna-Mission
- In office May 12, 2009 – September 21, 2020
- Preceded by: Sindi Hawkins
- Succeeded by: Renee Merrifield

Personal details
- Born: 1951 or 1952 (age 74–75)
- Party: Liberal

Steve Thomson (born 1951 or 1952) is a Canadian politician, who was elected as a BC Liberal Member of the Legislative Assembly of British Columbia in the 2009 provincial election, representing the riding of Kelowna-Mission. Thomson was re-elected in 2013 and 2017 and elected Speaker of the Legislative Assembly of British Columbia on June 22, 2017. He had previously served as Minister of Forests, Lands and Natural Resource Operations since 2011. Thomson resigned as Speaker on June 29, 2017, after less than a week in office, immediately following the defeat of the minority Liberal government of Christy Clark on a confidence vote.

Thomson joined the cabinet in 2009 as Minister of Agriculture and Lands and has also served as Minister of Natural Resource Operations, Minister of Energy, as chair to the Environment and Land Use Committee and as a member of the Treasury Board.

In Opposition, he served as the Official Opposition Critic for Citizens' Services and for Trade.

Prior to entering politics, he was executive director of the BC Agriculture Council, general manager of the BC Fruit Growers Association and the BC Milk Producers Association, as well as director of the Kelowna Museum, the Okanagan Innovation Fund, and the BC BioEnergy Network.

== Electoral record ==
2017 British Columbia general election: Kelowna-Mission
Party	Candidate	Votes	%	±%	Expenditures
Liberal	Steve Thomson	15,041	57.18	+0.32	$53,316
New Democratic	Harwinder Sandhu	5,720	21.24	−4.6	$13,757
Green	Rainer Wilkins	3,836	14.24	–	$18
Conservative	Charles Hardy	1,976	7.34	−5.33	$8,095
Total valid votes		26,933	100.00	–	
Total rejected ballots		112	0.42	−0.24	
Turnout		27,045	57.67	+4.09	
Registered voters		46,898			
Source: Elections BC

2013 British Columbia general election: Kelowna-Mission
Party	Candidate	Votes	%	±%	Expenditures
Liberal	Steve Thomson	13,687	56.86	+2.96	$78,163
New Democratic	Tish Lakes	6,221	25.84	−0.23	$28,693
Conservative	Mike McLoughlin	3,051	12.67	+0.81	$30,353
No Affiliation	Dayleen Van Ryswyk	1,113	4.62	–	$12,350
Total valid votes		24,072	100.00		
Total rejected ballots		161	0.66		
Turnout		24,233	53.58		
Source: Elections BC

B.C. General Election 2009 Kelowna-Mission
Party	Candidate	Votes	%	±	Expenditures
Liberal	Steve Thomson	11,506	53.90		$74,868
NDP	Tisha Kalmanovich	5,566	26.07		$21,149
Conservative	Mark Thompson	2,531	11.86		$9,931
Green	Crystal Wariach	1,563	7.32	–	$5,137
Independent	Silverado Socrates	130	0.61		$250
Refederation	Daniel Thorburn	51	0.24	–	$360
Total valid votes		21,347	100		
Total rejected ballots		115	0.54		
Turnout		21,462	50.68		
