= Renee Merrifield =

Canadian politician

Member of the British Columbia Legislative Assembly for Kelowna-Mission
- In office October 24, 2020 – September 21, 2024
- Preceded by: Steve Thomson
- Succeeded by: Gavin Dew

Personal details
- Party: BC United (provincial); Conservative (federal)

Renee Merrifield is a Canadian politician, who was elected to the Legislative Assembly of British Columbia in the 2020 British Columbia general election. She represented the electoral district of Kelowna-Mission as a member of the British Columbia United Party. She served as the Official Opposition Critic for Environment & Climate Change, Technology & Innovation, and Citizens’ Services. She previously served as the Official Opposition Critic for Health.

Merrifield ran in the 2022 British Columbia Liberal Party leadership election. She placed sixth and was eliminated on the second ballot. Kevin Falcon went on to win the election on the fifth ballot, and become the party's leader.

On May 16, 2024, Merrifield announced she would not be seeking a second term in the Legislature. Her seat was won by the Conservatives in the 2024 election.

== Electoral record ==
2020 British Columbia general election: Kelowna-Mission
Party	Candidate	Votes	%	±%	Expenditures
Liberal	Renee Merrifield	13,483	50.76	−6.88	$35,080.20
New Democratic	Krystal Smith	8,605	32.39	+11.36	$2,956.31
Green	Amanda Poon	4,476	16.85	+2.75	$9,613.90
Total valid votes		26,564	100.00	–	
Total rejected ballots					
Turnout					
Registered voters					
Source: Elections BC
