= Sunita Dhir =

Canadian politician

- ਸੁਨੀਤਾ ਧੀਰ
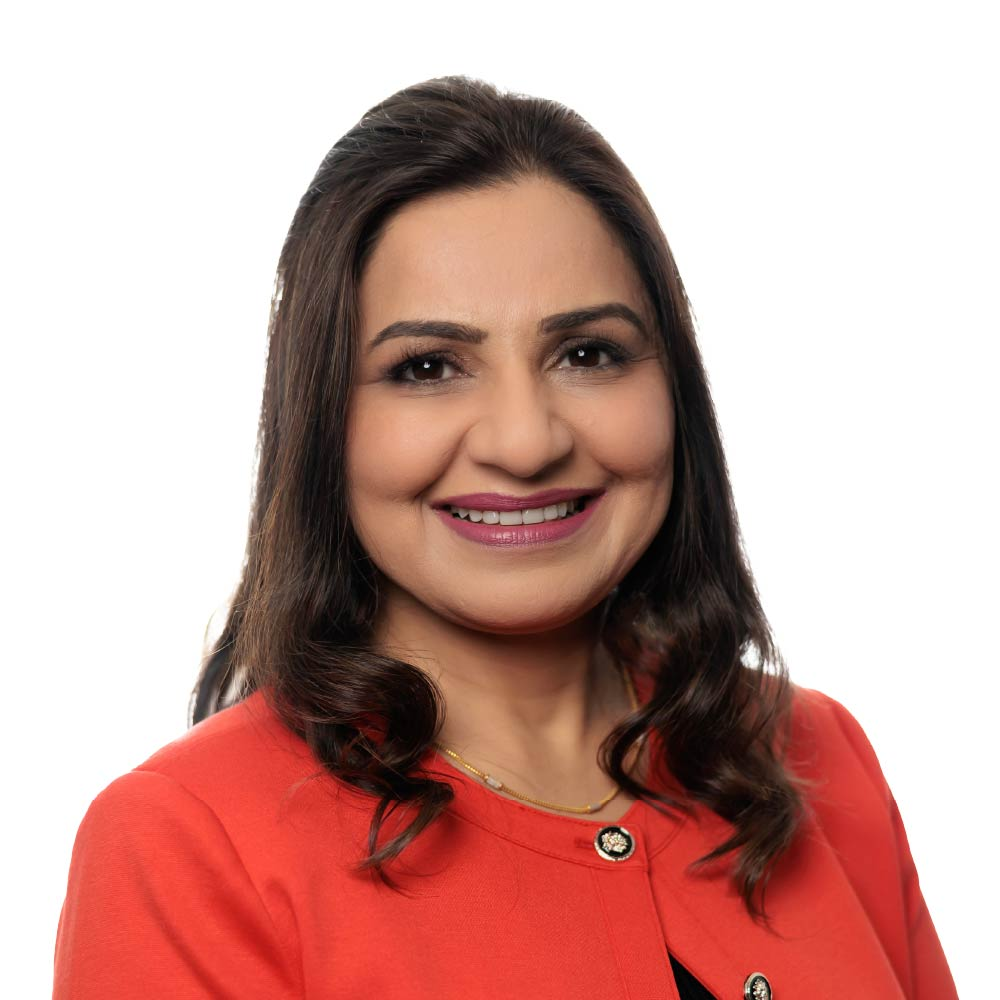
- Campaign portrait, 2024

Parliamentary Secretary for International Credentials of British Columbia
- Incumbent
- Assumed office November 18, 2024
- Premier: David Eby
- Preceded by: Ravi Parmar

Member of the British Columbia Legislative Assembly for Vancouver-Langara
- In office October 19, 2024 – October 24, 2026
- Preceded by: Michael Lee
- Succeeded by: Jaime Stein

Personal details
- Born: May 15, 1971 India
- Party: BC NDP
- Children: 2
- Education: Panjab University (MSc) (B.Ed.)

Sunita Dhir is a Canadian politician who was elected to the Legislative Assembly of British Columbia in the 2024 general election. She represented Vancouver-Langara as a member of the British Columbia New Democratic Party until 2026. Sunita was appointed Parliamentary Secretary for International Credentials in November 2024.

== Early life and career ==
Sunita was born in India and moved to Canada in 1992. She has lived in the South Vancouver and Marpole communities for the past 32 years. She holds a Bachelor of Education and a Master of Science degrees from Panjab University, as well as a Teaching English to Speakers of Other Languages (TESOL) certificate from Vancouver Community College. She previously worked as a language instructor for S.U.C.C.E.S.S., a non-profit organization that supports newcomers settle in B.C.

== Political career ==
Sunita stated her decision to run was influenced by her commitment to "stabilizing the housing market, improving affordability, and strengthening our healthcare system." She was endorsed by Grand Chief Stewart Phillip, President of the Union of British Columbia Indian Chiefs. Sunita was officially elected to the Legislative Assembly of British Columbia on October 20, 2024, one day after the election with a margin of 419 votes.

== Electoral record ==
2026 British Columbia general election: Vancouver-Langara
Party	Candidate	Votes	%	±%	Expenditures
Conservative	Jaime Stein	7,161	50.50	+4.45	
New Democratic	Sunita Dhir	5,530	38.92	−9.51	
Green	John Atoyebi	1,118	7.88	+2.36	
CentreBC	Alan Beesley	362	2.54	—	
Total valid votes		14,171			
Total rejected ballots					
Turnout					
Registered voters					
Conservative gain from New Democratic		Swing		+6.98	
Source: Elections BC

2024 British Columbia general election: Vancouver-Langara
Party	Candidate	Votes	%	±%	Expenditures
New Democratic	Sunita Dhir	8,506	48.43%	+4.33	
Conservative	Bryan Breguet	8,087	46.05%	–	
Green	Scottford Price	969	5.52%	-2.88	
Total valid votes		17,562	–		
Total rejected ballots		39	0.22%		
Turnout		17,601	51.83%		
Registered voters		33,961			
New Democratic notional gain from BC United		Swing		–	
Source: Elections BC

== See also ==
- 43rd Parliament of British Columbia
