= Darryl Plecas =

Canadian politician

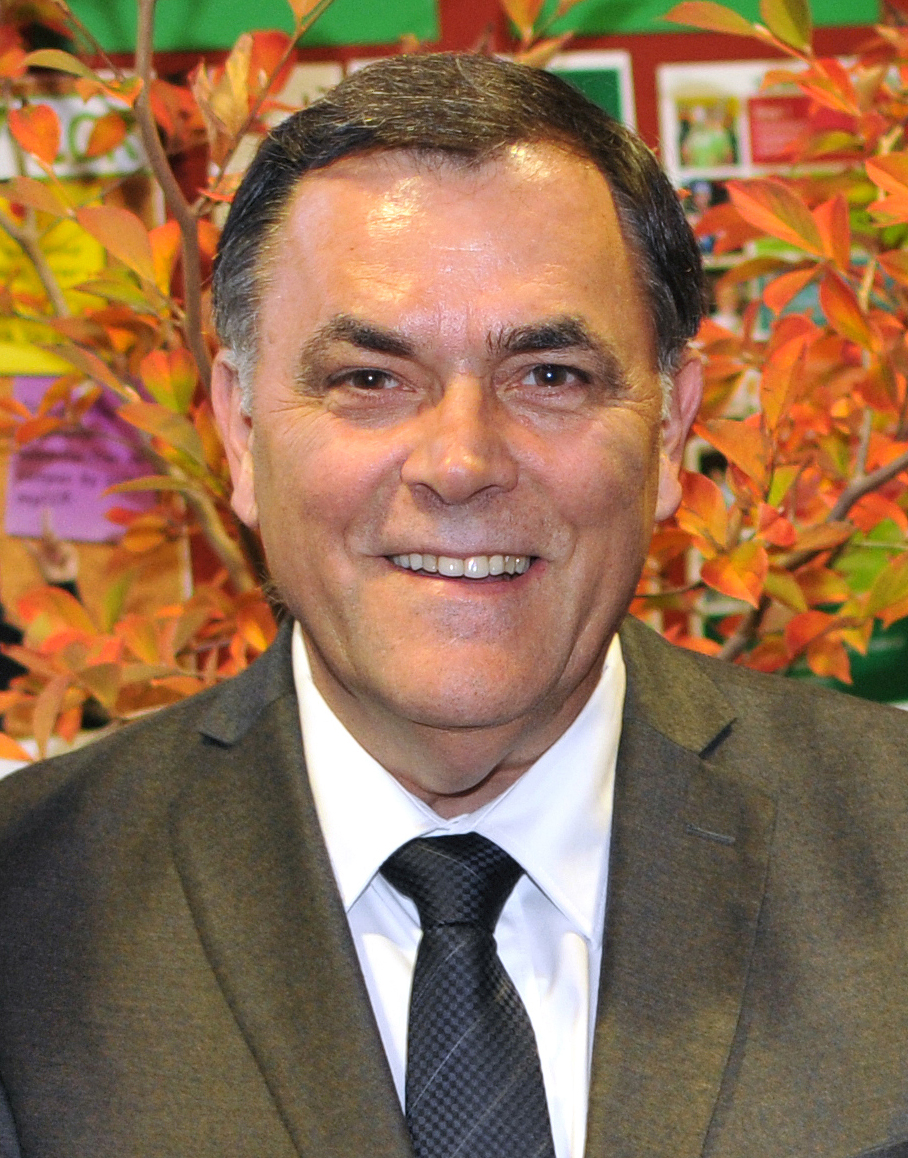

39th Speaker of the Legislative Assembly of British Columbia
- In office September 8, 2017 – October 24, 2020
- Preceded by: Steve Thomson
- Succeeded by: Raj Chouhan

Member of the British Columbia Legislative Assembly for Abbotsford South
- In office May 14, 2013 – October 24, 2020
- Preceded by: John van Dongen
- Succeeded by: Bruce Banman

Personal details
- Born: 1951 or 1952 (age 74–75) Abbotsford, British Columbia
- Party: New Democratic
- Other political affiliations: Independent (2017-2023); Liberal (until 2017)
- Profession: Criminologist

Darryl Plecas (born in 1951) is a Canadian politician, who was a member of the Legislative Assembly of British Columbia for Abbotsford South from 2013 to 2020, and served as Speaker of the Legislative Assembly of British Columbia from 2017 to 2020. He was first elected to the Legislative Assembly in the 2013 provincial election as a member of the British Columbia Liberal Party; after 2017, he sat as an independent after the BC Liberal Party revoked his membership for accepting his election as speaker. In 2023, Plecas became a member of the BC NDP but did not disclose any future political plans.

== Background ==
Plecas holds two degrees in criminology from Simon Fraser University and a doctorate in higher education from the University of British Columbia.

Plecas is a criminologist and emeritus faculty member at the University of the Fraser Valley, where he worked for 34 years, and helped turn the criminal justice program from a college diploma into a fully credited degree program. During this time, he also served as a federally appointed prison judge.

== Political career ==
Plecas served as Parliamentary Secretary to the Minister of Justice and Attorney General for Crime Reduction from June 10, 2013 to January 29, 2015. He was appointed Parliamentary Secretary to the Minister of Health for Seniors on January 30, 2015.

At a Liberal caucus meeting held in July 2017, shortly after the government of Christy Clark lost power following its defeat in a confidence vote, Plecas called for Clark's resignation as party leader and threatened to quit the Liberal caucus and sit as an independent MLA if she remained.

Later that month, Clark announced her resignation as leader. When Plecas revealed his role in Clark's ouster to The Abbotsford News, NDP house leader Mike Farnworth approached Plecas about becoming speaker. Had he accepted, it would have strengthened the hand of the NDP minority government. Clark had unsuccessfully pressed for a new election due to the prospect of an NDP speaker having to frequently use his casting vote to break 43-43 ties.

Plecas and Farnworth negotiated in secret for much of July before reaching a deal in late August, with only Premier John Horgan and a few senior staffers aware of their talks. Coincidentally, in early August, he was appointed the Official Opposition critic for BC Hydro. On September 8, 2017, he was acclaimed as Speaker. On the following day, the Liberals expelled Plecas upon the request of the Abbotsford South BC Liberal riding association, and Plecas served out his term as an independent.

Plecas later told The Province that he initially had no desire to be speaker, but changed his mind after concluding that there was no basis for Liberal claims that an NDP minority government supported by the Greens would be illegitimate. He said that with his earlier experience as a prison judge, he had the ability to be "impartial in difficult circumstances".

=== Legislative Assembly corruption scandal ===
In the year after being appointed speaker, Plecas grew suspicious of the conduct of two permanent officers of the BC Legislative Assembly: Clerk Craig James and Sergeant-at-Arms Gary Lenz. He brought the matter before the Legislative Assembly Management Committee (LAMC), who urged the speaker to publicize the corruption claims. The alleged crimes were reported to the Royal Canadian Mounted Police prior to the report's publication. A criminal investigation was launched by the RCMP. The preliminary report on the issue was published on January 21, 2019.

The Plecas Report cited expenses "in the range of a million dollars" to the Legislative Assembly for personal use, in the period of 20 months between April 2017 and December 2018. James and Lenz charged the legislature for a variety of luxury goods and inappropriate travel costs. They were also accused of questionably awarding themselves hundreds of thousands of dollars in employment benefits (e.g. retirement allowances and life insurance). Plecas raised concern about employer malpractice by James and Lenz, and attempts to conceal information related to their high expenditures. James in particular was noted for the theft of alcohol, and the contents of departing Premier Christy Clark's parliamentary vault.

James and Lenz denied the allegations of the report, and both submitted a written defense to the LAMC. James retired in May 2019, after an external administrative report conducted by former Supreme Court justice Beverly McLachlin determined his actions amounted to professional misconduct in several areas. Though the same report did not substantiate claims of misconduct by Lenz, a subsequent external investigation found he had lied during the McLachlin investigation, and that he had further neglected his duties as outlined by the Police Act. Shown a copy of the report days before its public release, Lenz resigned.

== Electoral record ==
=== 2017 election ===
2017 British Columbia general election: Abbotsford South
Party	Candidate	Votes	%	±%	Expenditures
Liberal	Darryl Plecas	11,683	52.48	+4.74	$64,989
New Democratic	Jasleen Arora	6,297	28.29	+7.28	$2,892
Green	William Aird Flavelle	3,338	15.00	–	$1,673
Christian Heritage	Ron Gray	942	4.23	–	$686
Total valid votes		22,260	100.00		
Total rejected ballots		174	0.78		
Turnout		22,434	54.71		
Liberal hold		Swing		+5.08	
Source: Elections BC

=== 2013 election ===
2013 British Columbia general election: Abbotsford South
Party	Candidate	Votes	%	±%
Liberal	Darryl Plecas	9,564	47.74	−10.73
Independent	John van Dongen	5,587	27.89	–30.58
New Democratic	Lakhvinder Jhaj	4,210	21.01	–4.64
Marijuana	Steve Finlay	417	2.08	–
Excalibur	Patricia Smith	256	1.28	–
Total valid votes		20,032	100.00	
Total rejected ballots		202	1.00	
Turnout		20,234	55.77	
Liberal hold		Swing		
Net change for van Dongen is in comparison to his 2009 vote percentage. Net change for Plecas is in comparison to the 2009 Liberal vote percentage; in other words the same basis as van Dongen.
Source: Elections BC
