= Bill Ritchie (politician) =

Canadian politician (1927–2014)

Member of the British Columbia Legislative Assembly for Central Fraser Valley
- In office May 10, 1979 – October 22, 1986
- Preceded by: Riding Established
- Succeeded by: Harry de Jong; Peter Albert Dueck

Personal details
- Born: February 25, 1927 Glasgow, Scotland
- Died: February 9, 2014 (aged 86) Qualicum Beach, British Columbia, Canada
- Party: Social Credit
- Spouse(s): Frances Maud Kathleen Ritchie; Nina Ritchie

William Samuel Ritchie (February 25, 1927 – February 7, 2014) was a Canadian businessman entrepreneur and politician. He served in the Legislative Assembly of British Columbia from 1979 to 1986, as a Social Credit member for the constituency of Central Fraser Valley.

== Biography ==
During World War II, Ritchie lied about his age and joined the British Royal Navy. He sold kindling door-to-door, giving his mother most of his earnings to help with family expenses. Ritchie farmed in Scotland and eventually moved to County Fermanagh, Northern Ireland where he married Maud Armstrong and had their first child.

In 1952, Ritchie left aboard the ship Empress of Canada and settled in Winnipeg there they had their second child. He held numerous jobs, all in agriculture except for a short time at Trans Canada Airlines and as a real estate agent. His career took him back and forth between Manitoba and British Columbia.

Eventually, Ritchie moved to Burnaby British Columbia there they had their third and fourth child and earning the position of General Sales Manager At Buckerfields Feed, he eventually moved to Abbotsford British Columbia and partnered with Dave Smith and formed "Ritchie-Smith Feeds Ltd."

== Political career ==
After selling Ritchie-Smith Feeds, he entered politics and become the MLA for Central Fraser Valley. He served in the Bill Bennett government as Minister of Municipal Affairs. In 1986, he did not seek re-election, after placing 10th in that year's Social Credit leadership race.

== Later life and death ==
He met and married, Nina in 1990. Eventually, they settled in Qualicum Beach where they resided until he died.
