= Carole Taylor =

Canadian politician

Carole Taylor OC OBC
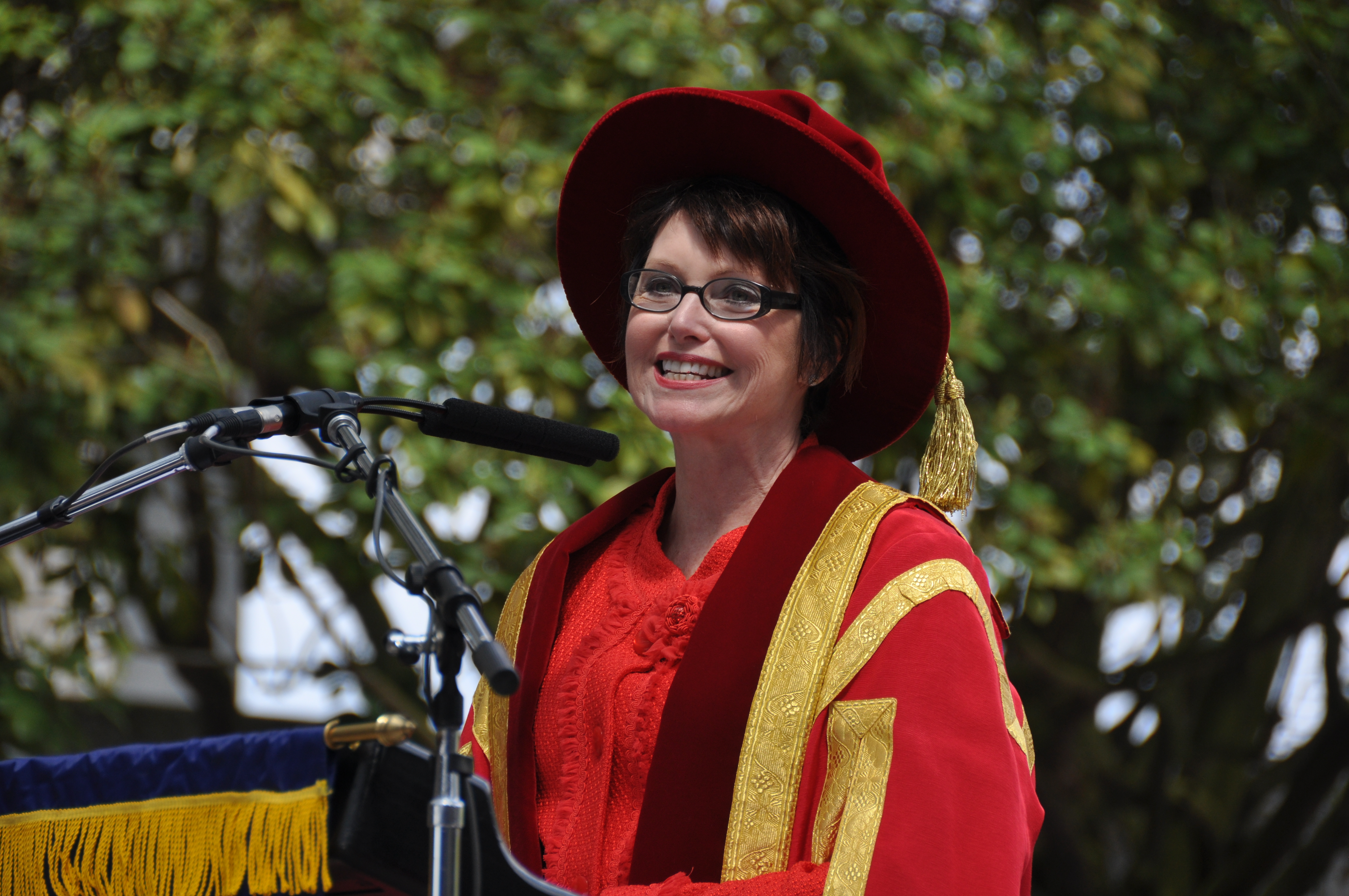
- Taylor being installed as Chancellor of Simon Fraser University in 2011

15th Chancellor of Victoria University, Toronto
- In office 2017–2020
- President: William R. Robins
- Preceded by: Wendy Marion Cecil
- Succeeded by: Nick Saul

Member of the British Columbia Legislative Assembly for Vancouver-Langara
- In office May 17, 2005 – December 18, 2008
- Preceded by: Val Anderson
- Succeeded by: Moira Stilwell

Minister of Finance of British Columbia
- In office June 16, 2005 – June 23, 2008
- Premier: Gordon Campbell
- Preceded by: Colin Hansen
- Succeeded by: Colin Hansen

Personal details
- Born: November 16, 1945 (age 80) Toronto, Ontario
- Party: BC Liberal Party
- Spouse: Art Phillips (deceased)
- Occupation: Journalist, politician, school chancellor

Carole Taylor OC OBC (born Carol Goss, November 16, 1945) is a Canadian school chancellor, journalist and former politician. She also served as the Chancellor of Simon Fraser University from June 2011 until June 2014. She previously served as British Columbia's Minister of Finance from 2005 until 2008 in the government of BC Liberal premier Gordon Campbell.

== TV career ==
Taylor was Miss Toronto 1964, and co-hosted CFTO-TV's After Four, a show for teenagers. She later appeared on several other CFTO shows, including Toronto Today, Topic, and her own Carole Taylor Show. She and Percy Saltzman were the first co-hosts of Canada AM when the show premiered on CTV in 1972. She has also been the host of W-FIVE and Pacific Report. Her career in journalism lasted for over 20 years.

== Political life ==
In Vancouver, she served as an independent member of Vancouver City Council from 1986 to 1990. She served as chair of the Vancouver Board of Trade from 2001 to 2002.

She was chair of the Canadian Broadcasting Corporation from July 16, 2001, until March 14, 2005, when she resigned to seek the nomination of the British Columbia Liberal Party in that province's 2005 election. On May 17, 2005, she was elected to Legislative Assembly of British Columbia in the 2005 election as the member representing Vancouver-Langara. On June 16, 2005, she was named Minister of Finance.

As the Minister of Finance, she signed up 100% of all BC public sector contracts before they were set to expire. Perhaps her most controversial achievement was the introduction of the first carbon tax in North America.

On November 30, 2007, she announced that she would not be running for re-election in the 2009 election. In one of her last acts as Finance Minister, Carole Taylor ended the corporate capital tax on banks—$100 million a year in government revenue. Upon leaving government, Taylor joined the TD Bank board where she stood to earn $145,000 to $300,000 per year. She was courted to run for mayor of Vancouver in the 2008 municipal election; however, she announced on January 8, 2008, that she would not run.

On December 18, 2008, she announced her resignation from the Legislative Assembly after accepting an appointment to a federal Ministry of Finance advisory panel.

According to Wikipedia she is also a member of The Trilateral Commission although this claim is not referenced.

== Personal life ==
She is the widow of former Vancouver mayor Art Phillips.

== Education ==
Carole Taylor graduated from Weston Collegiate Institute in 1964. She later attended Victoria University at the University of Toronto and graduated with a BA in English in 1967.

== Awards ==
- Doctor of Laws honoris causa – Justice Institute of British Columbia, 2009

Order of precedence
Preceded by Murray Farmer, Chancellor of University of Victoria	Order of precedence in British Columbia as of 2011	Succeeded by Nil – Last on the list
