= Sindi Hawkins =

Canadian politician and nurse (1958–2010)

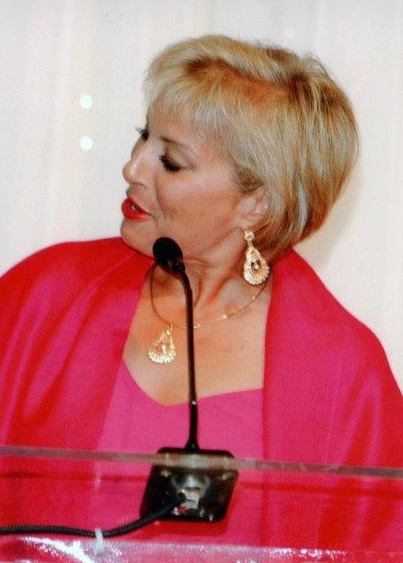
- Sindi Hawkins in 2008

Member of the British Columbia Legislative Assembly for Kelowna-Mission Okanagan West (1996-2001)
- In office May 28, 1996 – May 12, 2009
- Preceded by: Cliff Serwa
- Succeeded by: Steve Thomson

Minister of Health Planning of British Columbia
- In office June 5, 2001 – January 26, 2004
- Premier: Gordon Campbell
- Preceded by: Position established
- Succeeded by: Position abolished

Minister of State for Intergovernmental Relations of British Columbia
- In office January 26, 2004 – June 16, 2005
- Premier: Gordon Campbell
- Preceded by: Greg Halsey-Brandt
- Succeeded by: John van Dongen

Personal details
- Born: Satinder Kaur Ahluwalia; September 15, 1958 New Delhi, India
- Died: September 21, 2010 (aged 52) Calgary, Alberta
- Party: BC Liberal
- Spouse: Ralph Hawkins (divorced)
- Education: University of Calgary
- Profession: Nurse

Satinder Kaur "Sindi" Hawkins (née Ahluwalia; September 15, 1958 – September 21, 2010) was a Canadian politician who served as a member of the Legislative Assembly (MLA) of British Columbia, representing Okanagan West from 1996 to 2001 and Kelowna-Mission from 2001 to 2009. A caucus member of the British Columbia Liberal Party, she served in the cabinet of Premier Gordon Campbell as Minister of Health Planning from 2001 to 2004, and Minister of State for Intergovernmental Relations from 2004 to 2005. She was the first Punjabi woman elected to a Canadian legislature, and the first Indo-Canadian woman provincial cabinet minister.

== Early life and career ==
She was born Satinder Kaur Ahluwalia in New Delhi; her father Manohar Singh Ahluwalia was a communications officer under Prime Minister Jawaharlal Nehru. She moved to Canada with her family at age 5, settling in Sturgis, Saskatchewan. After graduating high school, she moved to Saskatoon and studied at the Kelsey Institute, receiving a diploma in nursing in 1981. While in Saskatoon she met her husband Ralph Hawkins; the two divorced in the 1990s.

She attended the School of Nursing of Foothills Hospital and the University of Calgary, graduating with a BN in 1988, and eventually became head nurse at the Tom Baker Cancer Centre in Calgary. She also held a post-graduate certificate in neuroscience nursing from the Montreal Neurological Hospital, becoming one of the first nurses in Canada to be certified in the discipline by the Canadian Nurses Association, and served as head nurse of neurosurgery at Foothills Hospital. Hawkins then earned a law degree from the University of Calgary in 1994, was called to the British Columbia Bar in 1995, and set up her own company as a lawyer with an interest in medical-legal issues.

== Politics ==
Hawkins ran as a BC Liberal candidate in the 1996 provincial election, and was elected MLA in the riding of Okanagan West. While the Liberals were the official opposition, she served as critic for health, and for employment and investment.

She was re-elected in 2001 in the redistributed riding of Kelowna-Mission by a margin of 12,285 votes, and was appointed to the cabinet that June by Premier Gordon Campbell to serve as Minister of Health Planning. In that role she was responsible for a long-term strategy for training more doctors and nurses in British Columbia. As a result, the province added medical school campuses at the University of Northern British Columbia in Prince George, the University of Victoria, and at UBC Okanagan in Kelowna. Her position was abolished in a January 2004 cabinet shuffle, and she was re-assigned as Minister of State for Intergovernmental Relations.

After winning re-election in 2005 by 5,638 votes, Hawkins was named Deputy Speaker of the Legislature that September.

== Cancer diagnosis, death ==
In 2004, Hawkins was diagnosed with leukemia and waged a high-profile battle with the illness; she was saved as a result of a bone marrow transplant from her sister. Hawkins campaigned for cancer research and bone marrow donation awareness. The cancer recurred in late 2007, and she underwent another bone marrow transplant and chemotherapy. On November 17, 2008, Hawkins announced that she would not run for re-election in 2009.

She began treatment for leukemia for the third time in March 2009. She died on September 21, 2010 at her eldest sister's home in Calgary, a week after her 52nd birthday. In her honour, the cancer centre in Kelowna was renamed the BC Cancer Agency Sindi Ahluwalia Hawkins Centre for the Southern Interior.
