= Val Anderson =

Canadian politician (1929–2006)

Member of the British Columbia Legislative Assembly for Vancouver-Langara
- In office October 17, 1991 – May 17, 2005
- Succeeded by: Carole Taylor

Personal details
- Born: February 14, 1929 Saskatoon, Saskatchewan
- Died: March 30, 2006 (aged 77) British Columbia, Canada
- Party: BC Liberal Party

Val Anderson (1929–2006) was a Canadian politician. He was first elected to the Legislative Assembly of British Columbia in the 1991 general election, as a candidate of the BC Liberal Party. He was reelected in 1996 and 2001. He was, however, unsuccessful candidate in the 1986 provincial election in the riding of Vancouver East.

In his youth, Anderson was a member of the Saskatchewan Older Boys' Parliament (now the Saskatchewan Youth Parliament).

He earned a Bachelor of Arts degree from the University of Saskatchewan and a Bachelor of Divinity from St. Andrew's College. He had a Master of Theology degree from Princeton Theological Seminary and completed two years on a doctoral program at Boston School of Theology.

Prior to serving as a Member of the Legislative Assembly (MLA), Anderson was a minister of the United Church of Canada and a former professor at the Vancouver School of Theology. Additionally, he was coordinator and editor of Canadian Multi Faith Action.

Anderson was active in community work. He was the founder and chair of the Vancouver Food Bank and the Pacific Youth and Family Addiction Service Society. He received the Good Neighbour Award in 1990, along with honors from the Social Justice Foundation of BC.

When first elected, Anderson served as the Deputy Critic for Social Services. Additionally, he served on the Government Caucus Committee on Communities & Safety, the Legislative Select Standing Committees on Aboriginal Affairs and Health, and the Multicultural Committee. He had previously served as a member of the Legislative Select Standing Committee on Parliamentary Reform, Ethical Conduct.

Anderson died on 30 March 2006 after a long battle with bowel cancer.

Preceded by Riding did not exist	MLA for Vancouver-Langara; 1991–2005	Succeeded by Carole Taylor
