= Michael Lee (Canadian politician) =

Canadian politician

- 李耀華
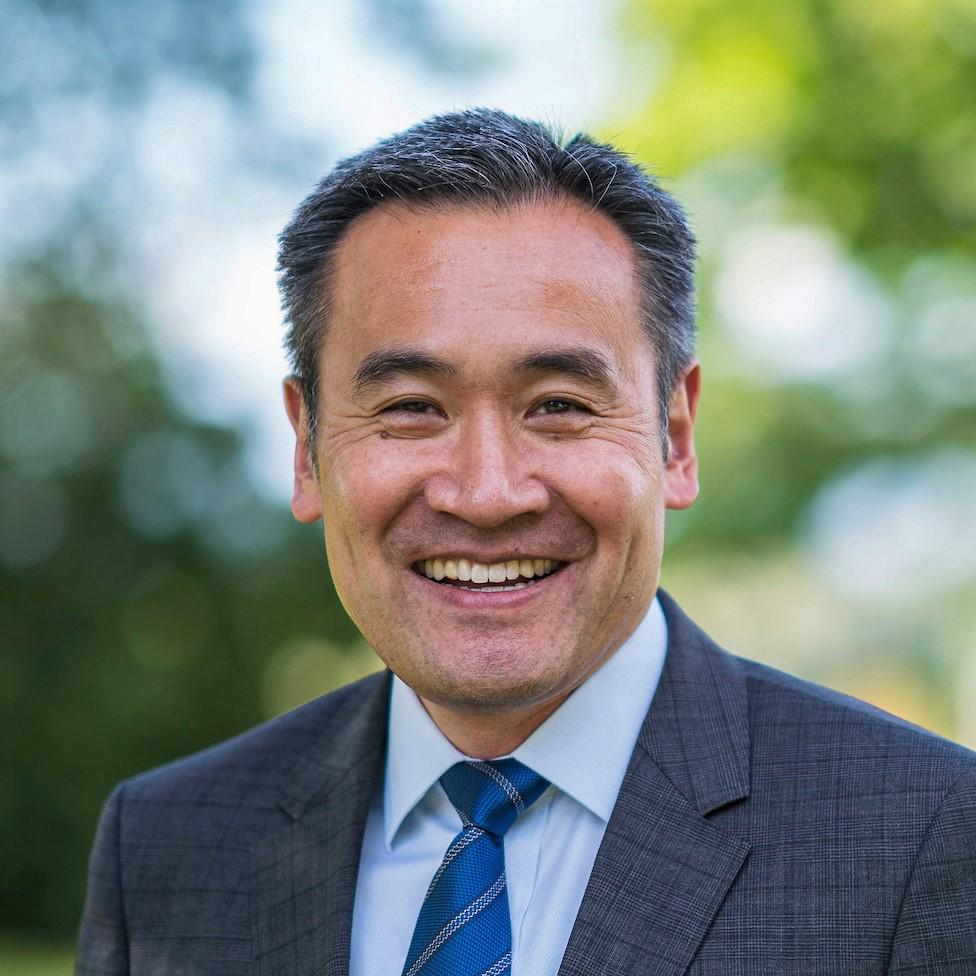

Member of the British Columbia Legislative Assembly for Vancouver-Langara
- In office May 9, 2017 – October 19, 2024
- Preceded by: Moira Stilwell
- Succeeded by: Sunita Dhir

Personal details
- Born: 1964 or 1965 (age 61–62) Vancouver, British Columbia, Canada
- Party: BC United
- Spouse: Christina Yan-Lee
- Education: University of Victoria; University of British Columbia
- Profession: Lawyer

Michael Lee
- Traditional Chinese: 李耀華
- Simplified Chinese: 李耀华
Transcriptions
Standard Mandarin
- Hanyu Pinyin: Lǐ Yàohuá
Yue: Cantonese
- Jyutping: Lei5 Jiu6 Waa4

Michael Lee (Chinese: 李耀華; born 1964 or 1965) is a Canadian politician who represented the electoral district of Vancouver-Langara in the Legislative Assembly of British Columbia from 2017 until 2024. A member of the BC United caucus, he served as its Critic for Indigenous Relations and Reconciliation. He ran for the party's leadership in 2018 and 2022.

== Background ==
Born in Vancouver, Lee is the son of immigrants from Hong Kong. His mother and father worked as a nurse and a pharmacist respectively. He attended the University of British Columbia, graduating with a Bachelor of Science in biology in 1986, Bachelor of Arts (Hons) in political science in 1989, and Master of Arts in political science with a focus on environmental regulations in 1992. He subsequently attained a law degree from the University of Victoria Faculty of Law, then practised business law in the resource sector, eventually becoming partner at Lawson Lundell LLP.

Lee is married with three young adult children.

== Political career ==
Lee worked as an assistant to former prime minister Kim Campbell during her time as Minister of Justice and Minister of National Defence, and was a youth organizer for the Progressive Conservatives. He also assisted in Tung Chan's successful campaign for Vancouver City Council in the 1990 municipal election.

He joined the British Columbia Liberal Party in 2002, serving as its membership chair at one point. He then ran for the Liberals in the 2017 provincial election, in which he was elected member of the Legislative Assembly (MLA) for Vancouver-Langara for the first time. He was re-elected MLA in the 2020 provincial election. During his time in the legislature, Lee has served as the Official Opposition Critic for Transportation, Infrastructure and TransLink; Official Opposition Critic for Justice; and Official Opposition Co-Critic for Indigenous Relations.

In September 2017, Lee announced he would run for the leadership of the BC Liberals. Despite winning the most votes over the first four rounds, he finished in third place behind winner Andrew Wilkinson and runner-up Dianne Watts.

On June 9, 2021, Lee announced he was running again for the leadership of the BC Liberals. This time he finished third behind winner Kevin Falcon and runner-up Ellis Ross on the fifth ballot.

On July 11, 2024, Lee announced that he would not be seeking re-election and instead be returning to the private sector at the end of his current term in office.

== Other activities ==
Lee has served as the past chair of the board of directors of Arts Umbrella, and Alumni UBC, the University of British Columbia alumni organization. He has also served as a past vice-chair and board member of Science World British Columbia, S.U.C.C.E.S.S., and Leadership Vancouver. Lee is a past board member of the YMCA of Greater Vancouver Foundation, the Justice Education Society of BC, Sustainable Cities International, and the Downtown Vancouver Business Improvement Association.

== Electoral record ==
2020 British Columbia general election: Vancouver-Langara
Party	Candidate	Votes	%	±%	Expenditures
Liberal	Michael Lee	9,888	48.51	+1.05	$58,300.21
New Democratic	Tesicca Chi-Ying Truong	8,431	41.36	+3.30	$42,051.83
Green	Stephanie Hendy	1,840	9.03	−4.64	$2,420.05
Libertarian	Paul Matthews	224	1.10	–	$0.00
Total valid votes		20,383	99.12	–	
Total rejected ballots		180	0.88	+0.23	
Turnout		20,563	49.45	−6.99	
Registered voters		41,581			
Liberal hold		Swing		−1.12	
Source: Elections BC

2017 British Columbia general election: Vancouver-Langara
Party	Candidate	Votes	%	±%	Expenditures
Liberal	Michael Lee	10,047	47.46	−5.14	$57,579
New Democratic	James Wang	8,058	38.06	−0.22	$76,064
Green	Janet Rhoda Fraser	2,894	13.67	+8.25	$6,721
Your Political Party	Surinder Singh Trehan	172	0.81	–	$6,699
Total valid votes		21,171	100.00	–	
Total rejected ballots		138	0.65	−0.23	
Turnout		21,309	56.44	+5.92	
Registered voters		37,754			
Source: Elections BC
