= 2017 British Columbian government formation =

2017 cabinet formation in British Columbia

- Date: May 9 – July 18, 2017
- Location: Victoria, British Columbia, Canada
- Cause: Hung parliament following the 2017 general election
- Participants: Christy Clark (premier, Liberal leader); John Horgan (NDP leader); Andrew Weaver (Green leader); Judith Guichon (lieutenant governor)
- Outcome: Resignation of Christy Clark as premier; Premiership of John Horgan; Horgan ministry; 2018 Liberal Party leadership election

The events leading up to the formation of the government of British Columbia took place between May 9 and July 18, 2017, following the 41st British Columbia general election. Neither the incumbent Liberal Party or the New Democratic Party, the two main parties in the province's legislature, were able to win a majority threshold of 44 seats, resulting in a hung parliament and uncertainty as to who would form government. By convention, the incumbent Liberals, led by Premier Christy Clark, continued to govern despite being one seat short of a parliamentary majority. Both the Liberals and the New Democrats attempted to persuade the Green Party to use their balance of power to either support or defeat the Clark government. The Green Party ultimately entered into a confidence and supply agreement with the New Democrats to support a New Democratic government led by John Horgan in exchange for the government's support of some Green Party campaign interests, such as electoral reform.

== Timeline of events ==
- April 11, 2017 – The 40th Parliament of British Columbia is dissolved, beginning the 2017 British Columbia general election campaign.
- May 9, 2017 – The 2017 British Columbia general election is held. After preliminary results, a minority government is projected. The BC Liberals are projected to win 43 seats, the BC NDP projected to win 41 seats, and the BC Greens projected to win 3 seats.
- May 22, 2017 – Elections BC begins counting absentee ballots.
- May 24, 2017 – Absentee ballot counting and result verification in each riding is completed. No seats change hands.
- May 25, 2017 – The Green Party (which holds the balance of power) begins negotiating with both the Liberals and the NDP to potentially create a confidence and supply or coalition agreement.
- May 29, 2017 – John Horgan, the leader of the NDP, and Andrew Weaver, the leader of the Greens, announce that their parties have reached a confidence and supply agreement. The agreement maintains that the NDP will govern the province with support from the Greens in exchange for certain Green policy priorities, including a referendum on electoral reform.
- June 22, 2017 – The 41st Parliament of British Columbia is opened. Christy Clark's throne speech is delivered in the Legislative Assembly.
- June 28, 2017 – Horgan introduces an amendment to the throne speech stating that the Legislative Assembly has lost confidence in Clark's Liberal government.
- June 29, 2017 – The motion of no confidence passes. Defeated, Clark requests a dissolution of the Legislature and a snap election, which is denied by the lieutenant governor.
- July 18, 2017 – Horgan is sworn in as the 36th premier of British Columbia.

== General election ==
2017 BC provincial election
- 87 seats in the Legislative Assembly; 44 seats needed for a majority
| Party | Leader | Vote % | Seats | +/– |
|---|---|---|---|---|
| Liberal | Christy Clark | 40.37 | 43 | −6 |
| New Democratic | John Horgan | 40.29 | 41 | +7 |
| Green | Andrew Weaver | 16.83 | 3 | +2 |
This lists parties that won seats. See the complete results below.
| Parliament before | Elected parliament |
|---|---|
| Liberal majority | Hung parliament |

The 2017 British Columbia general election took place on May 9 to fill the 87 seats of the British Columbia Legislative Assembly. By the end of the night, no party had won a majority, with the incumbent Liberals leading and holding 43 seats, one short of the required 44 seat majority threshold. As absentee ballots still had to be counted, which had the potential to flip some of the closer constituency elections, no winner was projected. Absentee ballot counting and some electoral recounts occurred up until May 24, but despite the close margins, there were no changes to the seat count reported on May 9, leaving the legislature with 43 Liberal seats, 41 New Democratic seats, and 3 Green seats. Technically, the Liberals had a plurality of seats but were in a precarious position as the two opposition parties together outnumbered them in the legislature by one seat.

== Initial statements and negotiations ==
On the night of the election, Christy Clark made a victory speech of sorts, acknowledging that despite winning the popular vote and a plurality of seats, their mandate was weaker, and they would have to collaborate with the other parties to satisfy the British Columbian electorate. Andrew Weaver, whose Green Party now held the balance of power, stated that he would negotiate with both parties in hopes that the next government would be supportive of some of the Green Party's initiatives. At around 12:30 am on May 10, John Horgan stated that "we've waited 16 years for a new government and we have to ask you to wait a little bit longer", confident that he would be able to defeat a minority Liberal government in a hung parliament. On May 29, Horgan and Weaver announced that they had reached a confidence and supply agreement where the Green Party would support an NDP government on budgets and matters of confidence. Despite the announcement, Clark did not resign and argued that it was her duty to attempt to maintain confidence of the Legislative Assembly, although admitting she would likely be unsuccessful.

During this time, who would become the next speaker of the Legislative Assembly was subject to speculation. The Legislature must elect a speaker before any other business, including the speech from the throne, can take place. However, as the speaker must be an MLA but only votes in the event of a tie, it would be disadvantageous for either a Liberal or NDP member to become the speaker, as it would effectively reduce the size of their caucus and make it more difficult for their party to maintain control of the Legislature. On June 14, the Liberals said they would put forward a speaker, but suggested the person would not stay in the role if their government was defeated.

== First session of the Legislative Assembly ==
Non-confidence vote results
| Caucus | Yes | No | Abst. |
|---|---|---|---|
| Total | 44 | 42 | 1 |
| █ Liberal | 0 | 42 | 1 (Note: Steve Thomson, the speaker of the assembly, did not cast a vote.) |
| █ New Democratic | 41 | 0 | 0 |
| █ Green | 3 | 0 | 0 |

The 41st Parliament of British Columbia was first convened on June 22. Steve Thomson, a Liberal, was acclaimed as Speaker by unanimous consent. Later that day, Lieutenant Governor of British Columbia Judith Guichon delivered the throne speech on behalf of Clark's government. The speech mentioned 48 initiatives that the Liberal government were planning to work towards, 30 of which were not part of the Liberal's campaign platform. This drew criticism from several former BC Liberal politicians, who saw the move as a cheap attempt to stay in power by pandering to the opposition parties, rather than sticking with the Liberal's electoral promises.

On June 28, John Horgan introduced a motion of no confidence against the Liberal government. It passed the next day by a vote of 44 to 42. All Liberal MLAs (except Thomson, who, as Speaker, abstained) voted against the motion, while all NDP and Green MLAs voted in favour of defeating the government.

Upon her government's defeat, Christy Clark requested that the lieutenant governor dissolve parliament so another election could be held. Despite Clark initially claiming that she would not seek another immediate election, she argued that no party could form a stable government with a one-seat margin in the legislature. Clark argued that if the NDP made one of its members speaker, they would have to frequently use their casting vote to break 43-43 ties. Guichon refused the request and granted John Horgan a chance to form government instead. Horgan's cabinet was sworn in on July 18, with Horgan becoming the 36th premier of British Columbia. Ten days later, Clark resigned as the BC Liberal party leader, with Rich Coleman being appointed as the interim leader.

== Aftermath ==
Following the defeat of the Liberal government on June 29, Thomson resigned as Speaker, leaving the house without a permanent speaker for the remainder of the legislative session. To avoid reducing their caucus by electing a New Democratic or Green speaker, NDP House Leader Mike Farnworth approached Liberal MLA Darryl Plecas, a critic of Christy Clark's handling of the transfer of power, to become the speaker. Plecas agreed and was elected Speaker on September 8 during the first meeting of the second legislative session. One day later, the BC Liberals expelled Plecas from their caucus, with Coleman claiming that he had betrayed his constituents and his Liberal colleagues. Plecas sat as an independent for the remainder of the parliamentary term.

Judith Guichon delivered a throne speech on behalf of the NDP government on September 8, 2017, outlining several priorities that were agreed upon by the NDP and the Greens in their confidence and supply agreement, including campaign finance reform, electoral reform, and launching an innovation commission to encourage investments in technology.

On February 8, 2018, the BC Liberals held their leadership election to replace Christy Clark, which was won by Andrew Wilkinson, the MLA for Vancouver-Quilchena.

In October 2019, Andrew Weaver left the Green Party to sit as an independent, citing a family health issue and personal matters, although he did not withdraw his confidence in the NDP government.

The Horgan ministry went on to govern the province from July 2017 until October 2020, when Horgan advised the lieutenant governor to call a snap election, arguing that the NDP needed a clearer mandate to continue governing through the COVID-19 pandemic. Horgan was criticized by some for calling the election early, as it violated the terms of the confidence and supply agreement with the Greens, who did not want an election to be called until the fixed-election date of October 16, 2021. Despite this, the general election held on October 24, 2020, resulted in a NDP majority government, with the party winning a record 57 seats (65.5%) in the legislative assembly.

== See also ==
- 1941 British Columbian government formation
