= Central Fraser Valley (electoral district) =

Defunct provincial electoral district in British Columbia, Canada

Central Fraser Valley was a provincial electoral district in the Canadian province of British Columbia from 1979 to 1986.

== Electoral history ==
Note: Winners in each election are in bold.

32nd British Columbia election, 1979
Party	Candidate	Votes	%	±	Expenditures
New Democratic	Jan Bakker	4,653	25.88%		unknown
Progressive Conservative	Eva Viola Barton	1,362	7.57%		unknown
Social Credit	**William Samuel Ritchie**	**11,967**	**66.55%**	–	unknown
Total valid votes		17,982	100.00%		
Total rejected ballots		279			
Turnout		%			

33rd British Columbia election, 1983
Party	Candidate	Votes	%	±	Expenditures
New Democrat	Harry Wilfred Fontaine	6,628	25.05%		unknown
Progressive Conservative	James Alexander McNeil	3,399	12.85%		unknown
Social Credit	**William Samuel Ritchie**	16,032	60.59%	–	unknown
Liberal	Jacob Victor Suderman	399	1.51%	–	unknown
Total valid votes		26,458	100.00%		
Total rejected ballots		419			
Turnout		%			

34th British Columbia election, 1986^{1}
Party	Candidate	Votes	%	±	Expenditures
New Democratic	Violet Bergen	6,805	13.44%		unknown
Social Credit	**Harry de Jong**	**15,900**	**31.41%**	–	unknown
Social Credit	**Peter Albert Dueck**	**16,961**	**33.51%**	–	unknown
Progressive Conservative	James Alexander McNeil	4,900	9.68%		unknown
New Democratic	J. Steven Mohr	6,052	11.96%		unknown
Total valid votes		50,618	100.00%		
Total rejected ballots		627			
Turnout		%			
^{1} Seat increased to two members from one.

== See also ==
- List of British Columbia provincial electoral districts
- Canadian provincial electoral districts
