= Vancouver-Langara =

Provincial electoral district in British Columbia, Canada

British Columbia electoral district
- Interactive map of riding boundaries

Provincial electoral district
- Legislature: Legislative Assembly of British Columbia
MLA
Jaime Stein
Conservative
- First contested: 1991
- Last contested: 2026

Demographics
- Population (2021): 55,724
- Area (km²): 12
- Pop. density (per km²): 4,643.7
- Census division: Metro Vancouver
- Census subdivision: Vancouver (part)

Vancouver-Langara is a provincial electoral district for the Legislative Assembly of British Columbia.

Created under the 1991 British Columbia electoral redistribution, the district was first contested in the 1991 general election. It was created from parts of Vancouver South.

== Demographics ==
Population, 2021	55,724
Area (km^{2})	12
Pop. Density (people per km^{2})	4,643
Source: BC Electoral Boundaries Commission

== Geography ==
This riding takes in neighbourhoods in south-central Vancouver, such as Marpole, Sunset and Oakridge. It is the most diverse provincial riding in Vancouver, with visible minorities making up 79% of the population.

== History ==
The riding was held by Moira Stilwell from 2009 to 2017, representing the BC Liberals. She was appointed Minister of Advanced Education and Labour Market Development in June 2009.

Stilwell's predecessor was Carole Taylor, former chair of the CBC and former Vancouver City Councillor. She was first elected in 2005 and appointed the Minister of Finance. She resigned on December 18, 2008.

From 2017 to 2024, the riding was represented by Michael Lee of BC United.

== Members of the Legislative Assembly ==
This riding has elected the following members of the Legislative Assembly:

Assembly	Years	Member	Party
Vancouver-Langara; Riding created from Vancouver South
35th	1991–1996	Val Anderson	Liberal
36th	1996–2001	Val Anderson	Liberal
37th	2001–2005	Val Anderson	Liberal
38th	2005–2008	Carole Taylor	Liberal
39th	2009–2013	Moira Stilwell	Liberal
40th	2013–2017	Moira Stilwell	Liberal
41st	2017–2020	Michael Lee	Liberal
42nd	2020–2023	Michael Lee	Liberal
42nd	2023–2024	Michael Lee	BC United
43rd	2024–2026	Sunita Dhir	New Democratic
44th	2026–present	Jaime Stein	Conservative

== Election results ==
2026 British Columbia general election
Party	Candidate	Votes	%	±%	Expenditures
Conservative	Jaime Stein	7,161	50.5	+4.5	
New Democratic	Sunita Dhir	5,530	39.0	-9.4	
Green	John Atoyebi	1,118	7.9	+2.4	
CentreBC	Alan Beesley	362	2.6	-	
Total valid votes		14,171			
Total rejected ballots					
Turnout					
Registered voters					
Conservative gain from New Democratic		Swing		+11.5	
Source: Elections BC

2024 British Columbia general election
Party	Candidate	Votes	%	±%	Expenditures
New Democratic	Sunita Dhir	8,506	48.43%	+4.33	
Conservative	Bryan Breguet	8,087	46.05%	–	
Green	Scottford Price	969	5.52%	-2.88	
Total valid votes		17,562	–		
Total rejected ballots		39	0.22%		
Turnout		17,601	51.83%		
Registered voters		33,961			
New Democratic notional gain from BC United		Swing		–	
Source: Elections BC

2020 provincial election redistributed results
Party	%
Liberal	46.4
New Democratic	44.1
Green	8.4
Libertarian	1.1

2020 British Columbia general election
Party	Candidate	Votes	%	±%	Expenditures
Liberal	Michael Lee	9,888	48.51	+1.05	$58,300.21
New Democratic	Tesicca Chi-Ying Truong	8,431	41.36	+3.30	$42,051.83
Green	Stephanie Hendy	1,840	9.03	−4.64	$2,420.05
Libertarian	Paul Matthews	224	1.10	–	$0.00
Total valid votes		20,383	99.12	–	
Total rejected ballots		180	0.88	+0.23	
Turnout		20,563	49.45	−6.99	
Registered voters		41,581			
Liberal hold		Swing		−1.12	
Source: Elections BC

2017 British Columbia general election
Party	Candidate	Votes	%	±%	Expenditures
Liberal	Michael Lee	10,047	47.46	−5.14	$57,579
New Democratic	James Wang	8,058	38.06	−0.22	$76,064
Green	Janet Rhoda Fraser	2,894	13.67	+8.25	$6,721
Your Political Party	Surinder Singh Trehan	172	0.81	–	$6,699
Total valid votes		21,171	100.00	–	
Total rejected ballots		138	0.65	−0.23	
Turnout		21,309	56.44	+5.92	
Registered voters		37,754			
Source: Elections BC

2013 British Columbia general election
Party	Candidate	Votes	%
Liberal	Moira Stilwell	10,234	52.60
New Democratic	George Chow	7,447	38.28
Green	Regan-Heng Zhang	1,055	5.42
Conservative	Gurjinder Bains	674	3.46
Platinum	Espavo Sozo	45	0.23
Total valid votes		19,455	100.00
Total rejected ballots		172	0.88
Turnout		19,627	50.52
Source: Elections BC

2009 British Columbia general election
Party	Candidate	Votes	%	Expenditures
Liberal	Moira Stilwell	10,615	58.87	$89,931
New Democratic	Helesia Luke	6,340	35.16	$19,002
Green	J-M Toriel	1,075	5.97	$948
Total valid votes		18,030	100	
Total rejected ballots		167	0.92	
Turnout		18,197	47.71	
Source: Elections BC

2005 British Columbia general election
Party	Candidate	Votes	%	±%	Expenditures
Liberal	Carole Taylor	11,181	56.55	▼10.36	$78,828
New Democratic	Anita Romaniuk	6,456	32.65	▲15.65	$9,044
Green	Doug Warkentin	1,584	8.01	▼3.38	$815
Marijuana	Mark Gueffroy	214	1.08	▼2.73	$100
Independent	Christopher De Wilde	185	0.94	N/A	$100
Work Less	Charlie Latimer	152	0.77	New	$100
Total valid votes		19,772	100.00		
Total rejected ballots		183	0.93		
Turnout		19,955	53.51		
Liberal hold		Swing		-13.01	

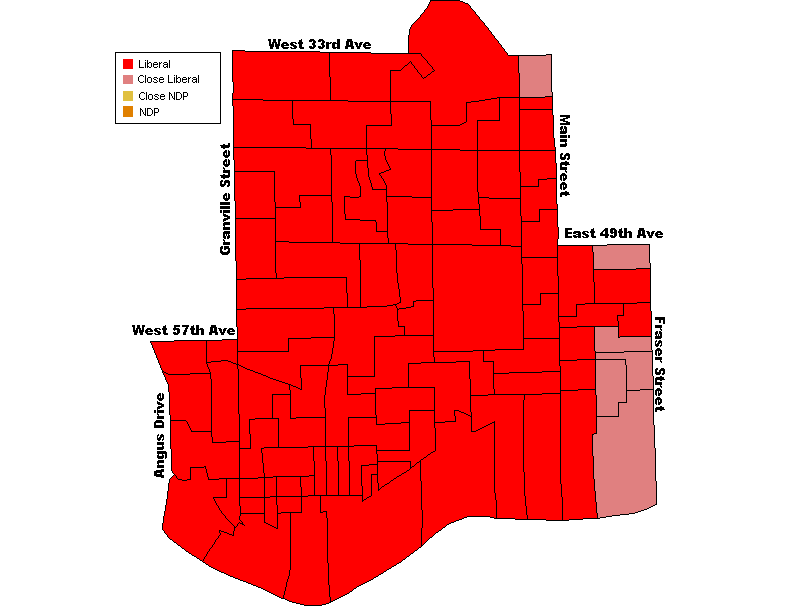
Popular vote by voting area in 2001

2001 British Columbia general election
Party	Candidate	Votes	%	±%	Expenditures
Liberal	Val Anderson	11,800	66.90	▲6.71	$29,498
New Democratic	Peter G. Prontzos	2,999	17.00	▼13.07	$2,596
Green	Doug Warkentin	2,009	11.39	▲9.55	$2,347
Marijuana	Anthony Campbell	673	3.82	New	$394
Independent	Joe Young	337	0.60	N/A	$362
People's Front	Michael Hill	51	0.29	New	$118
Total valid votes		17,637	100.00		
Total rejected ballots		203	1.15		
Turnout		17,840	67.38		
Liberal hold		Swing		+9.89	

1996 British Columbia general election
Party	Candidate	Votes	%	±%	Expenditures
Liberal	Val Anderson	11,038	60.20	▲23.25	$25,864
New Democratic	Ragini Rankin	5,515	30.08	▼4.49	$29,984
Progressive Democrat	Philip Read	839	27.42	New	$488
Reform	Christie Jung	519	2.83	New	$7,749
Green	Michael Airton	337	1.84	▲1.15	$100
Natural Law	Jerry Zen-Jih Chang	75	0.38	New	$118
Total valid votes		18,337	100.00		
Total rejected ballots		177	0.96		
Turnout		18,514	68.66		
Liberal hold		Swing		+13.87	

1991 British Columbia general election
Party	Candidate	Votes	%	Expenditures
Liberal	Val Anderson	7,241	36.95	$13,737
New Democratic	Peter M. Kendall	6,774	34.57	$25,805
Social Credit	Russell G. Fraser	5,374	27.42	$50,387
Green	Kamala J. Todd	134	0.88	$32
Conservative	Malcolm A. Weatherston	75	0.38	
Total valid votes		19,598	100.00	
Total rejected ballots		373	1.87	
Turnout		19,971	72.64	

== See also ==
- List of British Columbia provincial electoral districts
- Canadian provincial electoral districts
