= Peter Albert Dueck =

Canadian politician

Member of the British Columbia Legislative Assembly for Matsqui Central Fraser Valley (1986-1991)
- In office October 22, 1986 – November 30, 1993 Serving with Harry de Jong (1986-1991)
- Preceded by: William Samuel Ritchie
- Succeeded by: Mike de Jong

Personal details
- Born: July 5, 1923 Aliessovo, Orenburg, Soviet Union
- Died: February 19, 2015 (aged 91) British Columbia, Canada
- Party: Social Credit Party of British Columbia
- Spouse: Helen Goerz
- Children: Edward, Gerald, Larraine, Leonard
- Parent: Jacob P. Dueck
- Occupation: Real estate agent, Automotives dealer

Peter Albert Dueck (July 5, 1923 – February 19, 2015) was a politician and cabinet minister in the Canadian province of British Columbia.

He was an elected Member of the Legislative Assembly from 1986 to 1993 for the ridings of Central Fraser Valley and Matsqui, as a member of the Social Credit Party and later as an independent. Dueck served as a cabinet minister under premiers Bill Vander Zalm and Rita Johnston.

== Early life and career ==
Dueck was born in Aliessovo, Orenburg, USSR to Susanna (Dueck) Dueck and Jacob P. Dueck. He moved to a farm at Coaldale, Alberta at three years of age when his parents immigrated to Canada in 1926. He and his wife Helen moved to Abbotsford, BC where he co-founded MSA Motors car dealership in 1951. He later operated real estate and insurance firms.

== Political career ==
Dueck began his political career in 1978 as an alderman and deputy mayor for the Municipality of Matsqui. He turned to provincial politics in October 1986, when he was elected to the B.C. Legislature alongside Harry de Jong in the dual-member riding of Central Fraser Valley.

Dueck was one of five Socred ministers, along with Jack Kempf, Cliff Michael, Bill Reid and Bud Smith, who resigned when the party was accused of misconduct after the Fantasy Garden scandal affected Socred leader Bill Vander Zalm.

=== Health ministry ===
Dueck was Minister of Health when there was public debate about provincial provision of abortion services due to the legalization of abortion by the Supreme Court of Canada and also the provincial response to the rising number of HIV/AIDS cases. He resigned from cabinet on May 30, 1990, amidst a growing expenses scandal in his ministry related to the deputy minister, Stan Dubas. Dueck denied knowledge but accepted responsibility.

=== Advanced education ===
Dueck returned to cabinet on May 29, 1991, now headed by Rita Johnston. After an RCMP investigation cleared him of any wrongdoing in the expenses scandal, Johnston invited him back to cabinet. As Minister of Advanced Education, he announced in July 1991 the upgrade to university-college status for the Fraser Valley College in Abbotsford that later became the University of the Fraser Valley.

=== Re-election and resignation ===
In 1991, the dual-member riding was split up and Dueck was elected in the newly created riding of Matsqui. Dueck and de Jong were the only Socreds to win seats in the Fraser Valley.

Dueck became an independent MLA in February 1992, then resigned in November 1993 which created a by-election opportunity for new Socred leader Grace McCarthy to gain a seat in the legislature. Instead, the byelection saw rookie Liberal candidate and future cabinet minister Mike de Jong defeat McCarthy.

== Election results ==
34th British Columbia election, 1986^{1}
Party	Candidate	Votes	%	±	Expenditures
New Democratic	Violet Bergen	6,805	13.44%		unknown
Social Credit	Harry H. De Jong	15,900	31.41%	–	unknown
Social Credit	Peter Albert Dueck	16,961	33.51%	–	unknown
Progressive Conservative	James Alexander McNeil	4,900	9.68%		unknown
New Democratic	J. Steven Mohr	6,052	11.96%		unknown
Total valid votes		50,618	100.00%		
Total rejected ballots		627			
Turnout		%			
^{1} Seat increased to two members from one.
