= Kelowna-Mission =

Provincial electoral district in British Columbia, Canada

British Columbia electoral district
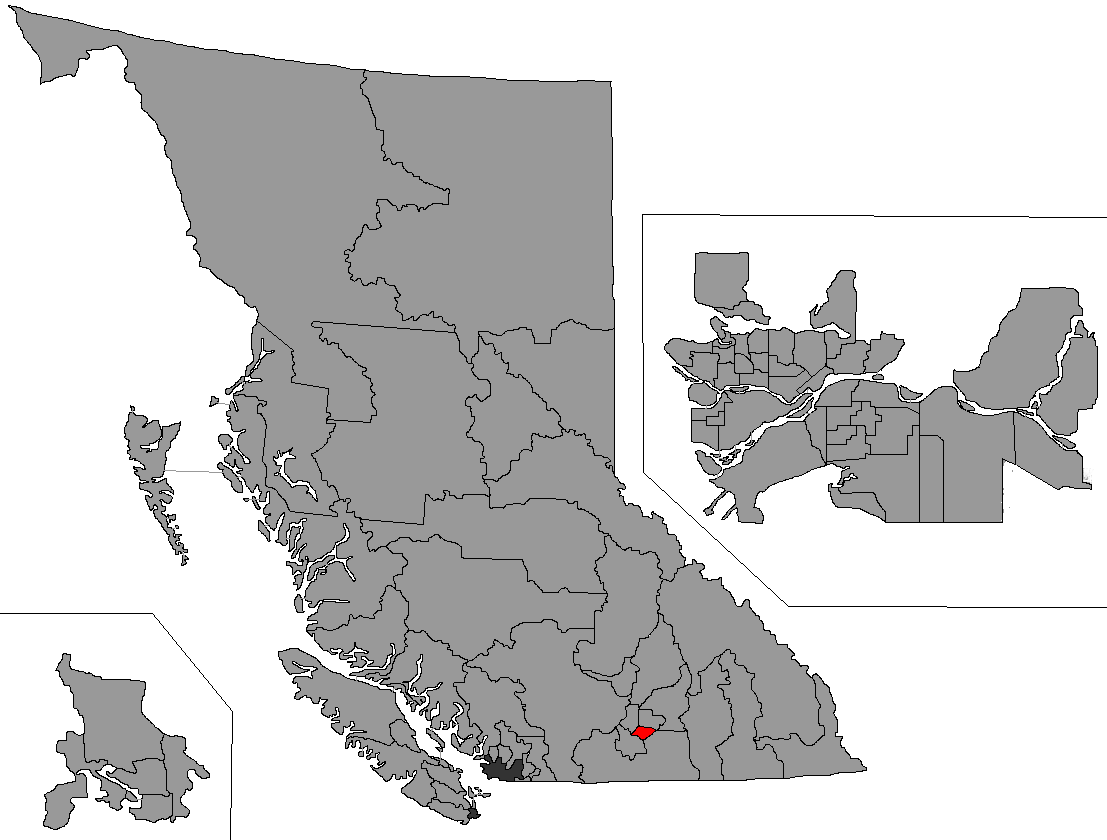

Provincial electoral district
- Legislature: Legislative Assembly of British Columbia
MLA
Gavin Dew
Conservative
- First contested: 2001
- Last contested: 2026

Demographics
- Population (2001): 55,040
- Area (km²): 172
- Pop. density (per km²): 320
- Census division: Regional District of Central Okanagan
- Census subdivision: Kelowna

Kelowna-Mission is a provincial electoral district for the Legislative Assembly of British Columbia, Canada. The district's name was changed from Okanagan West to Kelowna-Mission in the 1999 redistribution.

== Demographics ==
Population, 2001	55,040
Population change, 1996–2001	4.9%
Area (km^{2})	172
Population density (people per km^{2})	321

== Geography ==
As of the 2020 provincial election, Kelowna-Mission comprises the southeastern portion of the Regional District of Central Okanagan. This includes the southern area of the city of Kelowna. It is located in southern British Columbia.

== Members of the Legislative Assembly ==
Kelowna-Mission's MLA is Gavin Dew. He was first elected to represent the riding in the 2024 provincial election. He is a member of the BC Conservatives.

Prior to Gavin Dew, the MLA were Renee Merrifield and Hon. Steve Thomson respectively, the latter was the former executive director of the B.C. Agriculture Council. He was first elected to represent the riding in the 2009 provincial election, and was a member of the British Columbia Liberal Party.

Thomson was appointed Minister for Agriculture and Lands on June 10, 2009. He was elected to represent the riding of Kelowna-Mission on May 12, 2009.

Assembly	Years	Member	Party
Okanagan West; Riding created from Okanagan South
35th	1991–1996	Cliff Serwa	Social Credit
36th	1996–2001	Sindi Hawkins	Liberal
Kelowna-Mission
37th	2001–2005	Sindi Hawkins	Liberal
38th	2005–2009	Sindi Hawkins	Liberal
39th	2009–2013	Steve Thomson	Liberal
40th	2013–2017	Steve Thomson	Liberal
41st	2017–2020	Steve Thomson	Liberal
42nd	2020–2023	Renee Merrifield	Liberal
42nd	2023–2024	Renee Merrifield	BC United
43rd	2024–2026	Gavin Dew	Conservative
44th	2026–present	Gavin Dew	Conservative

== Election results ==
2026 British Columbia general election
Party	Candidate	Votes	%	±%	Expenditures
Conservative	Gavin Dew	13,590	58.68	+7.19	
New Democratic	Miriam Rycroft	6,427	27.75	-4.86	
Green	Saoirse MacKinnon	2,354	10.16	+5.22	
OneBC	Abraham Nordine	757	3.27	-	
Total valid votes		23,128	99.87		
Total rejected ballots		31	0.13		
Turnout					
Registered voters					
Conservative hold		Swing		+6.02	
Source: Elections BC

2024 British Columbia general election
Party	Candidate	Votes	%	±%	Expenditures
Conservative	Gavin Dew	14,071	51.49	–	$65,434.45
New Democratic	Harpreet Badohal	8,913	32.61	+1.4	$15,920.83
Unaffiliated	Ashley Ramsay	2,996	10.96	–	$8,727.88
Green	Billy Young	1,349	4.94	-12.1	$0.00
Total valid votes/expense limit		27,329	99.84	–	$71,700.08
Total rejected ballots		43	0.16	–	
Turnout		27,372	60.00	–	
Registered voters		45,617			
Conservative notional gain from BC United		Swing		N/A (Note: Swing cannot be calculated as BC United did not run a candidate in this riding.)	
Source: Elections BC

2020 provincial election redistributed results
Party	%
Liberal	51.8
New Democratic	31.2
Green	17.0

2020 British Columbia general election
Party	Candidate	Votes	%	±%	Expenditures
Liberal	Renee Merrifield	13,483	50.76	−6.88	$35,080.20
New Democratic	Krystal Smith	8,605	32.39	+11.36	$2,956.31
Green	Amanda Poon	4,476	16.85	+2.75	$9,613.90
Total valid votes		26,564	100.00	–	
Total rejected ballots					
Turnout					
Registered voters					
Source: Elections BC

2017 British Columbia general election
Party	Candidate	Votes	%	±%	Expenditures
Liberal	Steve Thomson	15,041	57.18	+0.32	$53,316
New Democratic	Harwinder Sandhu	5,720	21.24	−4.6	$13,757
Green	Rainer Wilkins	3,836	14.24	–	$18
Conservative	Charles Hardy	1,976	7.34	−5.33	$8,095
Total valid votes		26,933	100.00	–	
Total rejected ballots		112	0.42	−0.24	
Turnout		27,045	57.67	+4.09	
Registered voters		46,898			
Source: Elections BC

2013 British Columbia general election
Party	Candidate	Votes	%	±%	Expenditures
Liberal	Steve Thomson	13,687	56.86	+2.96	$78,163
New Democratic	Tish Lakes	6,221	25.84	−0.23	$28,693
Conservative	Mike McLoughlin	3,051	12.67	+0.81	$30,353
No Affiliation	Dayleen Van Ryswyk	1,113	4.62	–	$12,350
Total valid votes		24,072	100.00		
Total rejected ballots		161	0.66		
Turnout		24,233	53.58		
Source: Elections BC

B.C. General Election 2009 Kelowna-Mission
Party	Candidate	Votes	%	±	Expenditures
Liberal	Steve Thomson	11,506	53.90		$74,868
NDP	Tisha Kalmanovich	5,566	26.07		$21,149
Conservative	Mark Thompson	2,531	11.86		$9,931
Green	Crystal Wariach	1,563	7.32	–	$5,137
Independent	Silverado Socrates	130	0.61		$250
Refederation	Daniel Thorburn	51	0.24	–	$360
Total valid votes		21,347	100		
Total rejected ballots		115	0.54		
Turnout		21,462	50.68		

B.C. General Election 2005: Kelowna-Mission
Party	Candidate	Votes	%	±	Expenditures
Liberal	Sindi Hawkins	13,827	53.72%		$ 51,979
NDP	Nicki Hokazono	8,189	31.82%		$33,490
Green	Paddy Weston	3,308	12.85%	–	$ 2,700
Marijuana	Shilo Lavallee	320	1.24%		$0
Communist	Steve Roebuck	94	0.37%	N/A	$2,957
Total valid votes		25,738	100.00%		
Total rejected ballots		217	0.84%		
Turnout		25,955	57.00%		

B.C. General Election 2001: Kelowna-Mission
Party	Candidate	Votes	%	±	Expenditures
Liberal	Sindi Hawkins	15,351	64.60%		$35,275
NDP	Assunta Rosal	3,066	12.90%		$9,609
Green	Angela Reid	2,588	10.89%	–	$514
Unity	Paul Vogan	1,674	7.05%		$2,835
Marijuana	Kelly Nichol	787	3.31%		$4,065
Action	Grant Baudais	296	1.25%		$225
Total valid votes		23,762	100.00%		
Total rejected ballots		102	0.43%		
Turnout		23,864	67.56%		

== See also ==
- List of British Columbia provincial electoral districts
- Canadian provincial electoral districts

Legislative Assembly of British Columbia
Preceded by Richmond East	Constituency represented by the speaker June 22–29, 2017	Succeeded by Abbotsford South
