= Abbotsford South =

Provincial electoral district in British Columbia, Canada

British Columbia electoral district
- Interactive map of riding boundaries

Provincial electoral district
- Legislature: Legislative Assembly of British Columbia
MLA
Bruce Banman
Conservative
- District created: 2008
- First contested: 2009
- Last contested: 2026

Demographics
- Population (2021): 60,624
- Area (km²): 174
- Pop. density (per km²): 348.4
- Census division: Fraser Valley Regional District
- Census subdivision: Abbotsford

Abbotsford South is a provincial electoral district for the Legislative Assembly of British Columbia.

Established under the 2008 British Columbia electoral redistribution, it came into effect upon the 2009 British Columbia general election. It was created from parts of Abbotsford-Clayburn.

== Demographics ==
Population, 2021	60,624
Area (km^{2})	174
Pop. Density (people per km^{2})	348
Source: BC Electoral Boundaries Commission

== Geography ==
Located in Abbotsford, the district comprises the city centre and the neighbourhoods of Aberdeen, Poplar and Kilgard, as well as the community of Huntingdon. It is bordered by the Canada–United States border to the south and the city's eastern municipal boundary to the east, extending west to Bradner Road. Its northern boundary generally follows Highway 1.

== Members of the Legislative Assembly ==
This riding has elected the following members of the Legislative Assembly:

Assembly	Years	Member	Party
Abbotsford South; Riding created from Abbotsford-Clayburn
39th	2009–2012	John van Dongen	Liberal
39th	2012–2012	John van Dongen	Conservative
39th	2012–2013	John van Dongen	Independent
40th	2013–2017	Darryl Plecas	Liberal
41st	2017–2017	Darryl Plecas	Liberal
41st	2017–2020	Darryl Plecas	Independent
42nd	2020–2023	Bruce Banman	Liberal
42nd	2023–2023	Bruce Banman	BC United
42nd	2023–2024	Bruce Banman	Conservative
43rd	2024–2026	Bruce Banman	Conservative
43rd	2026–2026	Bruce Banman	Independent
43rd	2026–2026 (Note: Rejoined the Conservatives after dissolution.)	Bruce Banman	CentreBC
44th	2026–present	Bruce Banman	Conservative

== Election results ==
2026 British Columbia general election
** Preliminary results — Not yet official **
Party	Candidate	Votes	%	±%	Expenditures
Conservative	Bruce Banman	11,023	63.5		
New Democratic	Leah Ballantyne	5,201	29.9		
OneBC	Robin Roy	1,145	6.6		
Total valid votes					
Total rejected ballots					
Turnout					
Registered voters					
Source: Elections BC

2024 British Columbia general election
Party	Candidate	Votes	%	±%	Expenditures
Conservative	Bruce Banman	13,053	61.61	+59.2	$38,201.55
New Democratic	Sarah Kooner	7,454	35.18	+1.0	$11,353.64
Independent	Amandeep Singh	681	3.21	–	$1,680.00
Total valid votes/expense limit		21,188	99.75	–	$71,700.08
Total rejected ballots		54	0.25	–	
Turnout		21,242	51.72	–	
Registered voters		41,068			
Conservative notional gain from BC United		Swing		N/A (Note: Swing cannot be calculated as BC United did not run a candidate in this riding.)	
Source: Elections BC

2020 provincial election redistributed results
Party	%
Liberal	45.1
New Democratic	34.2
Green	11.1
Conservative	2.4

2020 British Columbia general election
Party	Candidate	Votes	%	±%	Expenditures
Liberal	Bruce Banman	9,730	44.69	−7.79	$44,289.90
New Democratic	Inder Johal	7,706	35.39	+7.30	$729.55
Green	Arid Flavelle	2,617	12.02	−2.98	$1,251.04
Christian Heritage	Laura-Lynn Thompson	1,720	7.90	+3.67	$0.00
Total valid votes		21,773	100.00	–	
Total rejected ballots		210	0.96	+0.18	
Turnout		21,983	48.46	−6.25	
Registered voters		45,365			
Liberal gain from Independent		Swing		−7.55	
Source: Elections BC

2017 British Columbia general election
Party	Candidate	Votes	%	±%	Expenditures
Liberal	Darryl Plecas	11,683	52.48	+4.74	$64,989
New Democratic	Jasleen Arora	6,297	28.29	+7.28	$2,892
Green	William Aird Flavelle	3,338	15.00	–	$1,673
Christian Heritage	Ron Gray	942	4.23	–	$686
Total valid votes		22,260	100.00		
Total rejected ballots		174	0.78		
Turnout		22,434	54.71		
Liberal hold		Swing		+5.08	
Source: Elections BC

2013 British Columbia general election
Party	Candidate	Votes	%	±%
Liberal	Darryl Plecas	9,564	47.74	−10.73
Independent	John van Dongen	5,587	27.89	–30.58
New Democratic	Lakhvinder Jhaj	4,210	21.01	–4.64
Marijuana	Steve Finlay	417	2.08	–
Excalibur	Patricia Smith	256	1.28	–
Total valid votes		20,032	100.00	
Total rejected ballots		202	1.00	
Turnout		20,234	55.77	
Liberal hold		Swing		
Net change for van Dongen is in comparison to his 2009 vote percentage. Net change for Plecas is in comparison to the 2009 Liberal vote percentage; in other words the same basis as van Dongen.
Source: Elections BC

2009 British Columbia general election
Party	Candidate	Votes	%
Liberal	John van Dongen	9,566	58.47
New Democratic	Bonnie Rai	4,197	25.65
Green	Daniel Bryce	1,244	7.61
Conservative	Gurcharan Dhaliwal	1,019	6.23
Independent	Tim Felger	334	2.04
Total valid votes		16,360	100.00
Total rejected ballots		205	1.25
Turnout		16,565	48.75
Registered voters		33,979	
Liberal hold		Swing	
Source: Elections BC

== See also ==
- List of British Columbia provincial electoral districts
- Canadian provincial electoral districts

Legislative Assembly of British Columbia
Preceded by Kelowna-Mission	Constituency represented by the speaker 2017–2020	Succeeded by Burnaby-Edmonds
