= John van Dongen =

Canadian politician (born 1949)

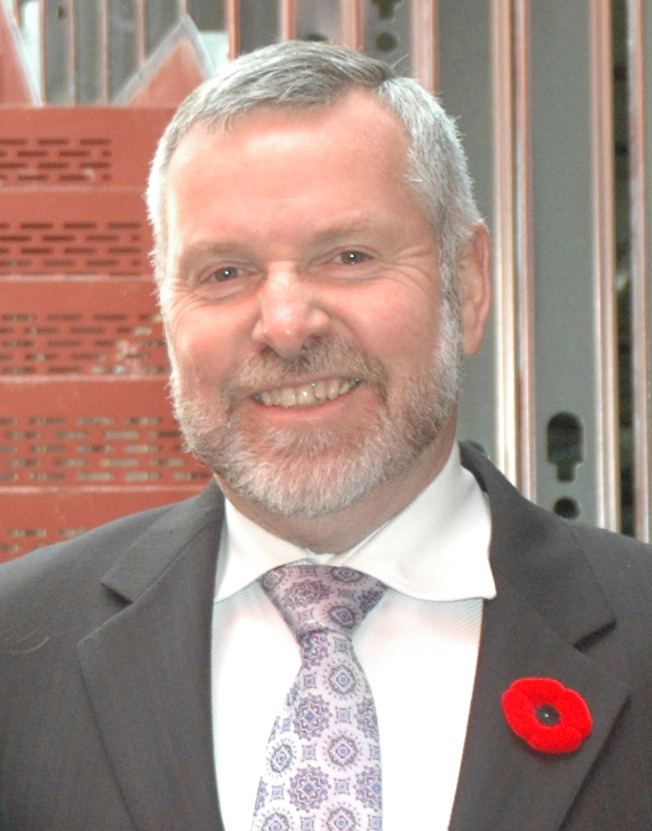

Member of the British Columbia Legislative Assembly for Abbotsford South Abbotsford-Clayburn (2001–2009) Abbotsford (1995–2001)
- In office May 3, 1995 – May 14, 2013
- Preceded by: Harry de Jong
- Succeeded by: Darryl Plecas

Minister of Agriculture, Food and Fisheries of British Columbia
- In office June 5, 2001 – January 28, 2003
- Premier: Gordon Campbell
- Preceded by: Ed Conroy
- Succeeded by: Stan Hagen
- In office April 3, 2003 – June 16, 2005
- Premier: Gordon Campbell
- Preceded by: Stan Hagen
- Succeeded by: Pat Bell

Minister of State for Intergovernmental Relations of British Columbia
- In office June 16, 2005 – June 23, 2008
- Premier: Gordon Campbell
- Preceded by: Sindi Hawkins
- Succeeded by: Joan McIntyre

Minister of Public Safety and Solicitor General of British Columbia
- In office April 1, 2008 – April 27, 2009
- Premier: Gordon Campbell
- Preceded by: John Les
- Succeeded by: Rich Coleman

Personal details
- Born: December 13, 1949 (age 76) Vancouver, British Columbia
- Party: BC Liberals (1995–2012); BC Conservatives (2012); Independent (since 2012)
- Spouse(s): Karen van Dongen (divorced) Sherri Wacker
- Education: University of British Columbia
- Occupation: farmer

John van Dongen (born December 13, 1949) is a Canadian politician who formerly served as a Member of the Legislative Assembly (MLA) of British Columbia, representing the riding of Abbotsford from 1995 to 2001, Abbotsford-Clayburn from 2001 to 2009, and Abbotsford South from 2009 to 2013. Part of the British Columbia Liberal Party caucus from 1995 to 2012, he served in several cabinet posts under Premier Gordon Campbell. He briefly sat in the legislature as a member of the BC Conservatives in 2012, before leaving that party later that year to serve out the remainder of his term as an independent politician.

== Background ==
John van Dongen was born in 1949 as the eldest of seven children, months after his parents immigrated to Canada from the Netherlands. They initially operated a dairy farm in Pitt Meadows, British Columbia before moving to Delta. He studied agricultural economics at the University of British Columbia, graduating with a Bachelor of Science degree.

He started his dairy farm in Dewdney in 1975 before moving it to Matsqui (now part of Abbotsford), and in 1979 won election as member of the board of the Fraser Valley Milk Producers' Association. He proceeded to serve on the boards of the B.C. Dairy Foundation, Agrifoods International Co-operative (Dairyland Canada), B.C. Federation of Dairymen's Association and the federal Farm Debt Review Board.

He was formerly married to Karen, with whom he has two sons. He had since married Sherri Wacker, his former constituency assistant.

== Politics ==
Following the resignation of Harry de Jong as MLA for Abbotsford in 1994, van Dongen ran in the 1995 by-election as a BC Liberal candidate, and was elected to the legislature. He was re-elected in 1996, 2001, 2005, and 2009. While the Liberals were in opposition, he served as agriculture and fisheries critic.

With the Liberals gaining power in 2001, he was named to the cabinet by Premier Gordon Campbell as Minister of Agriculture, Food and Fisheries. He was removed from the post in January 2003 while under investigation by the Royal Canadian Mounted Police regarding a decision to terminate a government probe into a salmon farm, but was reinstated that April.

After winning re-election in 2005, he was re-assigned Minister of State for Intergovernmental Relations, serving in that role until June 2008. He was named Minister of Public Safety and Solicitor General in April 2008, following the resignation of John Les from that post.

On April 24, 2009, van Dongen announced that the BC Office of the Superintendent of Motor Vehicles, a department for which he is responsible in the legislature, had suspended his driver's licence for a period of four months. In an interview with CBC Radio van Dongen said the suspension was a result of his being cited twice in one year for driving in excess of 41 km/h above the posted speed limit. Van Dongen had featured prominently in anti-speeding advertising campaigns for the provincial government. Three days later, van Dongen resigned as Minister of Public Safety and Solicitor General.

He stayed on as the Liberal candidate for the new riding of Abbotsford South in the 2009 provincial election, and was re-elected MLA. He was subsequently appointed party whip, and continued in his roles as Member of the Parliamentary Committee on Finance and Government Services, and Chair of the Caucus Committee on Government Restructuring. In 2010, he was appointed as the Chair of the Parliamentary Committee to Appoint a Chief Electoral Officer for BC.

On March 26, 2012, van Dongen announced he was leaving the BC Liberal Party to sit as the only BC Conservative Party MLA in the legislature. He cited the leadership of Christy Clark, who replaced Campbell as premier and party leader in 2011, as a factor in his departure from the Liberals. He then announced his resignation from the Conservative Party on September 22, 2012, and sat for the remainder of the 39th Parliament as an independent MLA.

He ran in the May 2013 provincial election as an independent candidate, and lost to Darryl Plecas of the Liberal Party.

== Election results ==
2013 British Columbia general election: Abbotsford South
| Party | Candidate | Votes | % | ±% |
|---|---|---|---|---|
| Liberal | Darryl Plecas | 9,564 | 47.74 | −10.73 |
| Independent | John van Dongen | 5,587 | 27.89 | –30.58 |
| New Democratic | Lakhvinder Jhaj | 4,210 | 21.01 | –4.64 |
| Marijuana | Steve Finlay | 417 | 2.08 | – |
| Excalibur | Patricia Smith | 256 | 1.28 | – |
| Total valid votes | | 20,032 | 100.00 | |
| Total rejected ballots | | 202 | 1.00 | |
| Turnout | | 20,234 | 55.77 | |
| Liberal hold | | Swing | | |
Net change for van Dongen is in comparison to his 2009 vote percentage. Net change for Plecas is in comparison to the 2009 Liberal vote percentage; in other words the same basis as van Dongen.
Source: Elections BC

2009 British Columbia general election: Abbotsford South
| Party | Candidate | Votes | % |
|---|---|---|---|
| Liberal | John van Dongen | 9,566 | 58.47 |
| New Democratic | Bonnie Rai | 4,197 | 25.65 |
| Green | Daniel Bryce | 1,244 | 7.61 |
| Conservative | Gurcharan Dhaliwal | 1,019 | 6.23 |
| Independent | Tim Felger | 334 | 2.04 |
| Total valid votes | | 16,360 | 100.00 |
| Total rejected ballots | | 205 | 1.25 |
| Turnout | | 16,565 | 48.75 |
| Registered voters | | 33,979 | |
| Liberal hold | | Swing | |
Source: Elections BC
