= Harry de Jong =

Canadian politician (1932–2014)

Harry De Jong

Member of the British Columbia Legislative Assembly for Abbotsford Central Fraser Valley (1986-1991)
- In office October 22, 1986 – November 1, 1994 Serving with Peter Albert Dueck (1986-1991)
- Preceded by: William Samuel Ritchie
- Succeeded by: John van Dongen

Personal details
- Born: March 25, 1932 Echten, Friesland, Netherlands
- Died: February 6, 2014 (aged 81) Chilliwack, British Columbia, Canada
- Party: Social Credit Party of British Columbia

Hans De Jong (March 25, 1932 – February 6, 2014) was a Canadian politician. He served in the Legislative Assembly of British Columbia from 1986 to 1994, as a Social Credit member for the constituencies of Central Fraser Valley and Abbotsford.

== Biography ==
In 1947, after World War II, he immigrated to Canada with his parents and siblings. They settled in the Abbotsford area and established themselves in farming. In 1950, de Jong met his wife, Ann. They were married in 1954 and started their lives together on a dairy farm in Deroche where de Jong successfully built his farming business. In the spring of 1962 they moved to Matsqui and continued dairy farming. They had five children.

== Political career ==
In 1971, de Jong ran for political office and served as an alderman until 1975 and then Mayor (1975–1987) for the District of Matsqui. In 1986, de Jong was elected MLA for the Social Credit Party. He served in Victoria for eight years including a time as Minister of Agriculture and Fisheries. In 2013, de Jong was awarded the Queen’s Diamond Jubilee Medal for his service to the community.
