= 42nd Parliament of British Columbia =

Canadian provincial legislature (2020–2024)

- Majority parliament
- Dec. 7, 2020 – Sep. 21, 2024

Parliament leaders
- Premier: John Horgan; Jul. 18, 2017 – Nov. 18, 2022
- David Eby; Nov. 18, 2022 – present
- Cabinets: Horgan (2nd); Eby (1st)
- Leader of the Opposition: Shirley Bond; Nov. 23, 2020 – May. 16, 2022
- Kevin Falcon; May. 16, 2022 – Oct. 19, 2024

Party caucuses
- Government: New Democratic Party
- Opposition: BC United
- Recognized: Conservative Party
- Green Party

Legislative Assembly
- Seating arrangements of the Legislative Assembly
- Speaker of the Assembly: Raj Chouhan; Dec. 7, 2020 – present
- Government House leader: Mike Farnworth; Jul. 18, 2017 – Dec. 7, 2022
- Ravi Kahlon; Dec. 7, 2022 – Nov. 18, 2024
- Opposition House leader: Todd Stone; Dec. 7, 2020 – Sep. 21, 2024
- Members: 87 MLA seats

Sovereign
- Monarch: Elizabeth II; Feb. 6, 1952 – Sep. 8, 2022
- Charles III; Sep. 8, 2022 – present
- Lieutenant governor: Janet Austin; Apr. 24, 2018 – Jan. 30, 2025

Sessions
- 1st session December 8, 2020 – April 12, 2021
- 2nd session April 13, 2021 – February 8, 2022
- 3rd session February 9, 2022 – February 6, 2023
- 4th session February 7, 2023 – September 21, 2024
← 41st	→ 43rd

The 42nd Parliament of British Columbia was chosen in the 2020 British Columbia general election. All 87 seats were up for election.

The 41st Parliament of British Columbia was dissolved on September 21, 2020. The 42nd Parliament convened for its first session on December 7, 2020.

== Party standings ==
Standings in the 42nd British Columbia Parliament
Affiliation	House members	
Affiliation	2020 election results	Dissolution
New Democratic	57	55
BC United	28	20
Conservative	0	8
Green	2	2
Independent	0	2
Total seats	87	

Changes in seats held (2020–2024)
Seat	Before				Change		
Seat	Date	Member	Party	Reason	Date	Member	Party
Vancouver-Quilchena	February 7, 2022	Andrew Wilkinson	█ Liberal	Resigned	April 30, 2022	Kevin Falcon	█ Liberal
Surrey South	April 30, 2022	Stephanie Cadieux	█ Liberal	Resigned	September 10, 2022	Elenore Sturko	█ Liberal
Nechako Lakes	August 18, 2022	John Rustad	█ Liberal	Removed from caucus			█ Independent
Nechako Lakes	February 16, 2023	John Rustad	█ Independent	Crossed the floor			█ Conservative
Vancouver-Mount Pleasant	February 22, 2023	Melanie Mark	█ New Democratic	Resigned	June 24, 2023	Joan Phillip	█ New Democratic
Langford-Juan de Fuca	March 31, 2023	John Horgan	█ New Democratic	Resigned	June 24, 2023	Ravi Parmar	█ New Democratic
→ BC Liberals become BC United (April 12, 2023)
Abbotsford South	September 13, 2023	Bruce Banman	█ BC United	Crossed the floor			█ Conservative
Parksville-Qualicum	September 17, 2023	Adam Walker	█ New Democratic	Removed from caucus			█ Independent
Coquitlam-Maillardville	March 6, 2024	Selina Robinson	█ New Democratic	Left caucus			█ Independent
Cariboo-Chilcotin	May 31, 2024	Lorne Doerkson	█ BC United	Crossed the floor			█ Conservative
Surrey South	June 3, 2024	Elenore Sturko	█ BC United	Crossed the floor			█ Conservative
Richmond North Centre	July 29, 2024	Teresa Wat	█ BC United	Crossed the floor			█ Conservative
Delta South	September 3, 2024	Ian Paton	█ BC United	Crossed the floor			█ Conservative
Kamloops-North Thompson	September 3, 2024	Peter Milobar	█ BC United	Crossed the floor			█ Conservative
Surrey-White Rock	September 3, 2024	Trevor Halford	█ BC United	Crossed the floor			█ Conservative

== Election and appointments ==
The members of the legislative assembly were elected in the 42nd general election, held on October 24, 2020. The election resulted in an absolute majority for the BC NDP, and after a judicial recount in West Vancouver-Sea to Sky the final results had 57 BC NDP members, 28 BC Liberals, and 2 BC Greens being certified. As leader of the BC NDP, John Horgan continued from the previous parliament as premier. Even though BC Liberal leader Andrew Wilkinson won his riding in Vancouver-Quilchena, he resigned as leader of the Opposition prior to the new parliament commencing, with Shirley Bond assuming that position and being interim leader of the BC Liberals. In replacing members of his Executive Council that had retired, Horgan added newly elected MLAs Jennifer Whiteside as minister of Education, Murray Rankin as minister of Indigenous Relations, and Josie Osborne as minister of Municipal Affairs, as well as Nathan Cullen as minister of state for Lands and Natural Resources. Continuing in their roles from the previous parliament, Adrian Dix continued as minister of Health, David Eby as attorney general, George Heyman as minister of Environment, Harry Bains as minister of Labour, Lana Popham as minister of Agriculture, and Mike Farnworth as solicitor general.

== First session ==
The first session of the 42nd parliament began on December 17, 2020, with the speech from the throne delivered by Lieutenant Governor Janet Austin on behalf of Premier Horgan and the BC NDP government. The first session only lasted four months, with all bills receiving royal assent by the end of March. Among the legislation adopted, the Firearm Violence Prevention Act (Bill 4) repealed and replaced the Firearm Act and included new measures as recommended in the 2017 report from a previous parliament's Illegal Firearms Task Force, such as a prohibition on the sale of imitation and low-velocity guns to youth. Bill 5 created the position of the Fairness Officer at ICBC to replace the corporation's Fairness Commissioner; Bill 8 brought the Real Estate Council of BC and the Office of the Superintendent of Real Estate under the regulatory authority of the BC Financial Services Authority; and Bill 9 amended how local government elections are conducted by regulating activities during a defined pre-campaign period, limiting sponsorship contributions and creating a registry of elector organizations.

== Second session ==
The second session began on April 12, 2021, with a new speech from the throne delivered by Lieutenant Governor Austin. There were no changes to the membership of the Executive Council, though Mike Farnworth was named deputy premier in October after Horgan was diagnosed with throat cancer. Budget measures were implemented in Bill 4 and included freezing the carbon tax for one year, creating the BC Recovery Benefit as a one-time payment of $500 per individual on income assistance, creating the temporary Increased Employment Incentive program for employers to hire new employees, extending the book publishing tax credit by 5 years, and increasing the tobacco tax. COVID-related legislation included a new entitlement for employees to receive paid leave to receive a vaccination against COVID-19, prohibiting until July 2023 any conduct that disrupts access to COVID-19 vaccination sites or hospitals with emergency rooms, making permanent several temporary measures allowing electronic local government council meetings, and extending the COVID-19 Related Measures Act to December 31, 2022.

New acts adopted with all-party support included the Accessible British Columbia Act, to allow accessibility-related regulations to be implemented affecting the built environment, delivery of government services, and in the health and education sectors; and the Early Childhood Educators Act, to create oversight of early childhood educators. With all-party support, the Early Learning and Child Care Act repealed and replaced the Child Care BC Act and the Child Care Subsidy Act. With the BC Liberal Party voting to oppose, the InBC Investment Corp. Act was adopted to create a new Crown corporation to administer a new small business investment fund.

Significant amendments to existing legislation, with all-party support, included adding "Indigenous identity" to the BC Human Rights Code and adding "single-use product" (i.e. plastics) to the list of packaging materials that may be regulated or prohibited. On division, with the BC Liberal Party opposed, the Electoral Boundaries Commission Act was amended to increase the number of electoral districts from 87 to 93 and remove the provisions that required a certain number to be located in the North, the Cariboo-Thompson and the Columbia-Kootenay regions despite population factors; and forestry-related legislation was amended to require forestry companies to publicly disclose where operations will occur, replace forest stewardship plans with forest landscape plans with a new set of objectives, require licence holders maintain inventories of ecosystems, recreation-visual resources, reduce annual allowable cuts for purposes of redistribution to small businesses and create a new designation for non-timber production purpose. With both Liberals and Green Party MLAs voting against, the Freedom of Information and Protection of Privacy Act was amended to allow data-hosting outside of BC and allow disclosure of personal information outside Canada and to create a fee to apply for a freedom-of-information request.

== Officeholders ==
=== Speaker ===
- Speaker of the Legislative Assembly: Raj Chouhan, NDP (December 7, 2020 – present)

=== Other chair occupants ===
- Deputy speaker: Spencer Chandra Herbert, NDP (December 7, 2020 – present)
- Assistant deputy speaker: Jackie Tegart, Liberal (February 7, 2022 – present)
- Deputy chair, Committee of the Whole: Ronna-Rae Leonard, NDP (December 7, 2020 – present)

=== Leaders ===
- Premier of British Columbia:
  - John Horgan, NDP (July 18, 2017 – November 18, 2022)
  - David Eby, NDP (November 18, 2022 – present)
- Leader of the Opposition:
  - Andrew Wilkinson, Liberal (February 3, 2018 – November 23, 2020)
  - Shirley Bond, Liberal (interim; November 23, 2020 – February 5, 2022)
  - Kevin Falcon, Liberal (February 5, 2022 – April 11, 2023)
  - Kevin Falcon, United (April 12, 2023 – present)
- Green Party leader:
  - Sonia Furstenau (September 14, 2020 – present)
- Conservative Party leader:
  - John Rustad

=== House leaders ===
- Government House Leader: Ravi Kahlon, NDP
- Opposition House Leader: Todd Stone, Liberal

== Members of the 42nd Parliament ==
- The name in bold and italics, with "††", is the premier
- The names in bold, with "†", are cabinet ministers and ministers of state
- The name in italics, with "‡" is the leader of the Official Opposition
- The names in italics are party leaders
- The name with "*" is the Speaker of the Assembly

Member	Party	Electoral district	First elected / previously elected	Term number
**Pam Alexis** †	New Democratic	Abbotsford-Mission	2020	1
Bruce Banman	Liberal	Abbotsford South	2020	1
Bruce Banman	United	Abbotsford South	2020	1
Bruce Banman	Conservative (Note: Was elected as a member of the BC Liberal Party and subsequently crossed the floor)	Abbotsford South	2020	1
Mike de Jong	Liberal	Abbotsford West	1994	8
Mike de Jong	United	Abbotsford West	1994	8
Roly Russell	New Democratic	Boundary-Similkameen	2020	1
**Anne Kang** †	New Democratic	Burnaby-Deer Lake	2017	2
Raj Chouhan *	New Democratic	Burnaby-Edmonds	2005	5
Katrina Chen	New Democratic	Burnaby-Lougheed	2017	2
Janet Routledge	New Democratic	Burnaby North	2017	2
Lorne Doerkson	Liberal	Cariboo-Chilcotin	2020	1
Lorne Doerkson	United	Cariboo-Chilcotin	2020	1
Lorne Doerkson	Conservative	Cariboo-Chilcotin	2020	1
Coralee Oakes	Liberal	Cariboo North	2013	3
Coralee Oakes	United	Cariboo North	2013	3
**Dan Coulter** †	New Democratic	Chilliwack	2020	1
Kelli Paddon	New Democratic	Chilliwack-Kent	2020	1
Doug Clovechok	Liberal	Columbia River-Revelstoke	2017	2
Doug Clovechok	United	Columbia River-Revelstoke	2017	2
Fin Donnelly	New Democratic	Coquitlam-Burke Mountain	2020	1
Selina Robinson	New Democratic	Coquitlam-Maillardville	2013	3
Selina Robinson	Independent (Note: Elected as member of the NDP, resigned from caucus on March 6, 2024)	Coquitlam-Maillardville	2013	3
Ronna-Rae Leonard	New Democratic	Courtenay-Comox	2017	2
Sonia Furstenau	Green	Cowichan Valley	2017	2
**Ravi Kahlon** †	New Democratic	Delta North	2017	2
Ian Paton	Liberal	Delta South	2017	2
Ian Paton	United	Delta South	2017	2
Ian Paton	Conservative	Delta South	2017	2
**Mitzi Dean** †	New Democratic	Esquimalt-Metchosin	2017	2
Jackie Tegart	Liberal	Fraser-Nicola	2013	3
Jackie Tegart	United	Fraser-Nicola	2013	3
Peter Milobar	Liberal	Kamloops-North Thompson	2017	2
Peter Milobar	United	Kamloops-North Thompson	2017	2
Peter Milobar	Conservative	Kamloops-North Thompson	2017	2
Todd Stone	Liberal	Kamloops-South Thompson	2013	3
Todd Stone	United	Kamloops-South Thompson	2013	3
Norm Letnick	Liberal	Kelowna-Lake Country	2009	4
Norm Letnick	United	Kelowna-Lake Country	2009	4
Renee Merrifield	Liberal	Kelowna-Mission	2020	1
Renee Merrifield	United	Kelowna-Mission	2020	1
Ben Stewart	Liberal	Kelowna West	2009, 2018	4*
Ben Stewart	United	Kelowna West	2009, 2018	4*
Tom Shypitka	Liberal	Kootenay East	2017	2
Tom Shypitka	United	Kootenay East	2017	2
**Katrine Conroy** †	New Democratic	Kootenay West	2005	5
**John Horgan** ‡ (to March 1, 2023)	New Democratic	Langford-Juan de Fuca	2005	5
Ravi Parmar (from June 24, 2023)	New Democratic	Langford-Juan de Fuca	2023	1
**Andrew Mercier** †	New Democratic	Langley	2020	1
Megan Dykeman	New Democratic	Langley East	2020	1
Bob D'Eith	New Democratic	Maple Ridge-Mission	2017	2
**Lisa Beare** †	New Democratic	Maple Ridge-Pitt Meadows	2017	2
**Josie Osborne** †	New Democratic	Mid Island-Pacific Rim	2020	1
**Sheila Malcolmson** †	New Democratic	Nanaimo	2019	2
Doug Routley	New Democratic	Nanaimo-North Cowichan	2005	5
John Rustad	Liberal	Nechako Lakes	2005	5
John Rustad	Independent	Nechako Lakes	2005	5
John Rustad	Conservative	Nechako Lakes	2005	5
Brittny Anderson	New Democratic	Nelson-Creston	2020	1
**Jennifer Whiteside** †	New Democratic	New Westminster	2020	1
Jennifer Rice	New Democratic	North Coast	2013	3
Michele Babchuk	New Democratic	North Island	2020	1
**Bowinn Ma** †	New Democratic	North Vancouver-Lonsdale	2017	2
Susie Chant	New Democratic	North Vancouver-Seymour	2020	1
**Murray Rankin** †	New Democratic	Oak Bay-Gordon Head	2020	1
Adam Walker	New Democratic	Parksville-Qualicum	2020	1
Adam Walker	Independent (Note: Elected as member of the NDP, removed from caucus following an internal investigation.)	Parksville-Qualicum	2020	1
Dan Davies	Liberal	Peace River North	2017	2
Dan Davies	United	Peace River North	2017	2
Mike Bernier	Liberal	Peace River South	2013	3
Mike Bernier	United	Peace River South	2013	3
Dan Ashton	Liberal	Penticton	2013	3
Dan Ashton	United	Penticton	2013	3
**Mike Farnworth** †	New Democratic	Port Coquitlam	1991, 2005	7*
Rick Glumac	New Democratic	Port Moody-Coquitlam	2017	2
**Nicholas Simons** †	New Democratic	Powell River-Sunshine Coast	2005	5
Mike Morris	Liberal	Prince George-Mackenzie	2013	3
Mike Morris	United	Prince George-Mackenzie	2013	3
Shirley Bond	Liberal	Prince George-Valemount	2001	6
Shirley Bond	United	Prince George-Valemount	2001	6
Teresa Wat	Liberal	Richmond North Centre	2013	3
Teresa Wat	United	Richmond North Centre	2013	3
Teresa Wat	Conservative	Richmond North Centre	2013	3
Aman Singh	New Democratic	Richmond-Queensborough	2020	1
Henry Yao	New Democratic	Richmond South Centre	2020	1
Kelly Greene	New Democratic	Richmond-Steveston	2020	1
Adam Olsen	Green	Saanich North and the Islands	2017	2
**Lana Popham** †	New Democratic	Saanich South	2009	4
Greg Kyllo	Liberal	Shuswap	2013	3
Greg Kyllo	United	Shuswap	2013	3
Ellis Ross	Liberal	Skeena	2017	2
Ellis Ross	United	Skeena	2017	2
**Nathan Cullen** †	New Democratic	Stikine	2020	1
Mike Starchuk	New Democratic	Surrey-Cloverdale	2020	1
**Jagrup Brar** †	New Democratic	Surrey-Fleetwood	2004, 2017	5*
**Rachna Singh** †	New Democratic	Surrey-Green Timbers	2017	2
Garry Begg	New Democratic	Surrey-Guildford	2017	2
**Harry Bains** †	New Democratic	Surrey-Newton	2005	5
Jinny Sims	New Democratic	Surrey-Panorama	2017	2
Stephanie Cadieux (to April 30, 2022)	Liberal	Surrey South	2009	4
Elenore Sturko (from September 10, 2022)	Liberal	Surrey South	2022	1
Elenore Sturko (from September 10, 2022)	United	Surrey South	2022	1
Elenore Sturko (from September 10, 2022)	Conservative	Surrey South	2022	1
**Bruce Ralston** †	New Democratic	Surrey-Whalley	2005	5
Trevor Halford	Liberal	Surrey-White Rock	2020	1
Trevor Halford	United	Surrey-White Rock	2020	1
Trevor Halford	Conservative	Surrey-White Rock	2020	1
**George Heyman** †	New Democratic	Vancouver-Fairview	2013	3
**Brenda Bailey** †	New Democratic	Vancouver-False Creek	2020	1
George Chow	New Democratic	Vancouver-Fraserview	2017	2
**Niki Sharma** †	New Democratic	Vancouver-Hastings	2020	1
Mable Elmore	New Democratic	Vancouver-Kensington	2009	4
**Adrian Dix** †	New Democratic	Vancouver-Kingsway	2005	5
Michael Lee	Liberal	Vancouver-Langara	2017	2
Michael Lee	United	Vancouver-Langara	2017	2
**Melanie Mark** † (to April 14, 2023)	New Democratic	Vancouver-Mount Pleasant	2016	3
Joan Phillip (from June 24, 2023)	New Democratic	Vancouver-Mount Pleasant	2023	1
**David Eby** † †	New Democratic	Vancouver-Point Grey	2013	3
Andrew Wilkinson †† (to February 17, 2022)	Liberal	Vancouver-Quilchena	2013	3
Kevin Falcon ‡ (from April 30, 2022)	Liberal	Vancouver-Quilchena	2001, (Note: Surrey-Cloverdale) 2022	4*
Kevin Falcon ‡ (from April 30, 2022)	United	Vancouver-Quilchena	2001, 2022	4*
Spencer Chandra Herbert	New Democratic	Vancouver-West End	2008	5
Harwinder Sandhu	New Democratic	Vernon-Monashee	2020	1
**Grace Lore** †	New Democratic	Victoria-Beacon Hill	2020	1
**Rob Fleming** †	New Democratic	Victoria-Swan Lake	2005	5
Karin Kirkpatrick	Liberal	West Vancouver-Capilano	2020	1
Karin Kirkpatrick	United	West Vancouver-Capilano	2020	1
Jordan Sturdy	Liberal	West Vancouver-Sea to Sky	2013	3
Jordan Sturdy	United	West Vancouver-Sea to Sky	2013	3

== By-elections ==
- 2022 Vancouver-Quilchena provincial by-election
- 2022 Surrey South provincial by-election
- 2023 Langford-Juan de Fuca provincial by-election
- 2023 Vancouver-Mount Pleasant provincial by-election
