= Dana Lajeunesse =

Canadian politician

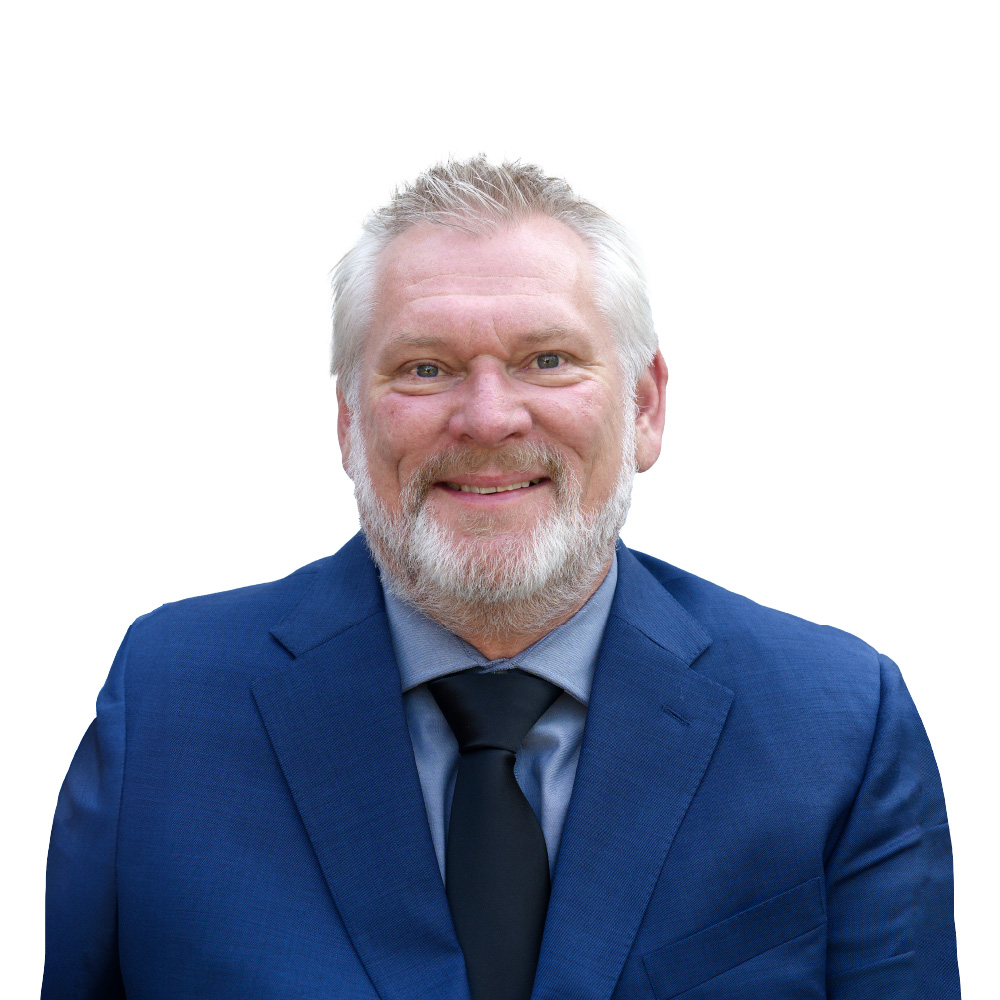
- Campaign portrait, 2024

Parliamentary Secretary for Accessibility of British Columbia
- Incumbent
- Assumed office November 18, 2024
- Premier: David Eby
- Preceded by: Susie Chant

Member of the British Columbia Legislative Assembly for Juan de Fuca-Malahat
- In office October 19, 2024 – October 24, 2026
- Preceded by: Constituency established
- Succeeded by: Mike Hicks

Member of the District of Sooke Municipal Council
- In office September 30, 2019 – November 7, 2024

Personal details
- Party: New Democratic

Dana Lajeunesse is a Canadian politician who served as a member of the Legislative Assembly of British Columbia (MLA) representing the electoral district of Juan de Fuca-Malahat from 2024 to 2026. He is a member of the New Democratic Party.

== Early life and education ==
Born and raised in Jordan River, British Columbia, Lajeunesse worked in the forestry industry until a workplace accident left him a wheelchair user. He later retrained in mechanical engineering at Camosun College, where he subsequently worked as an engineering technician and instructor.

== Political career ==
Lajeunesse served on the council of the District of Sooke from 2019 until his election to the Legislative Assembly.

He was elected to the Legislative Assembly of British Columbia in the 2024 provincial election. Due to a narrow margin of victory, the result was not confirmed until a judicial recount concluded more than a week after election day.

== Electoral history ==
2024 British Columbia general election: Juan de Fuca-Malahat
| Party | Candidate | Votes | % | ±% | Expenditures |
|---|---|---|---|---|---|
| New Democratic | Dana Lajeunesse | 9,308 | 38.79 | -13.4 | $46,931.79 |
| Conservative | Marina Sapozhnikov | 9,167 | 38.20 | – | $18,521.77 |
| Green | David Evans | 5,522 | 23.01 | -10.4 | $31,663.56 |
| Total valid votes/expense limit | | 23,997 | 99.87 | – | $71,700.08 |
| Total rejected ballots | | 32 | 0.13 | – | |
| Turnout | | 24,029 | 64.81 | – | |
| Registered voters | | 37,078 | | | |
| New Democratic notional hold | | Swing | | -25.8 | |
Source: Elections BC

== See also ==
- 43rd Parliament of British Columbia
