= Ravi Parmar =

Canadian politician

Ravi Parmar MLA
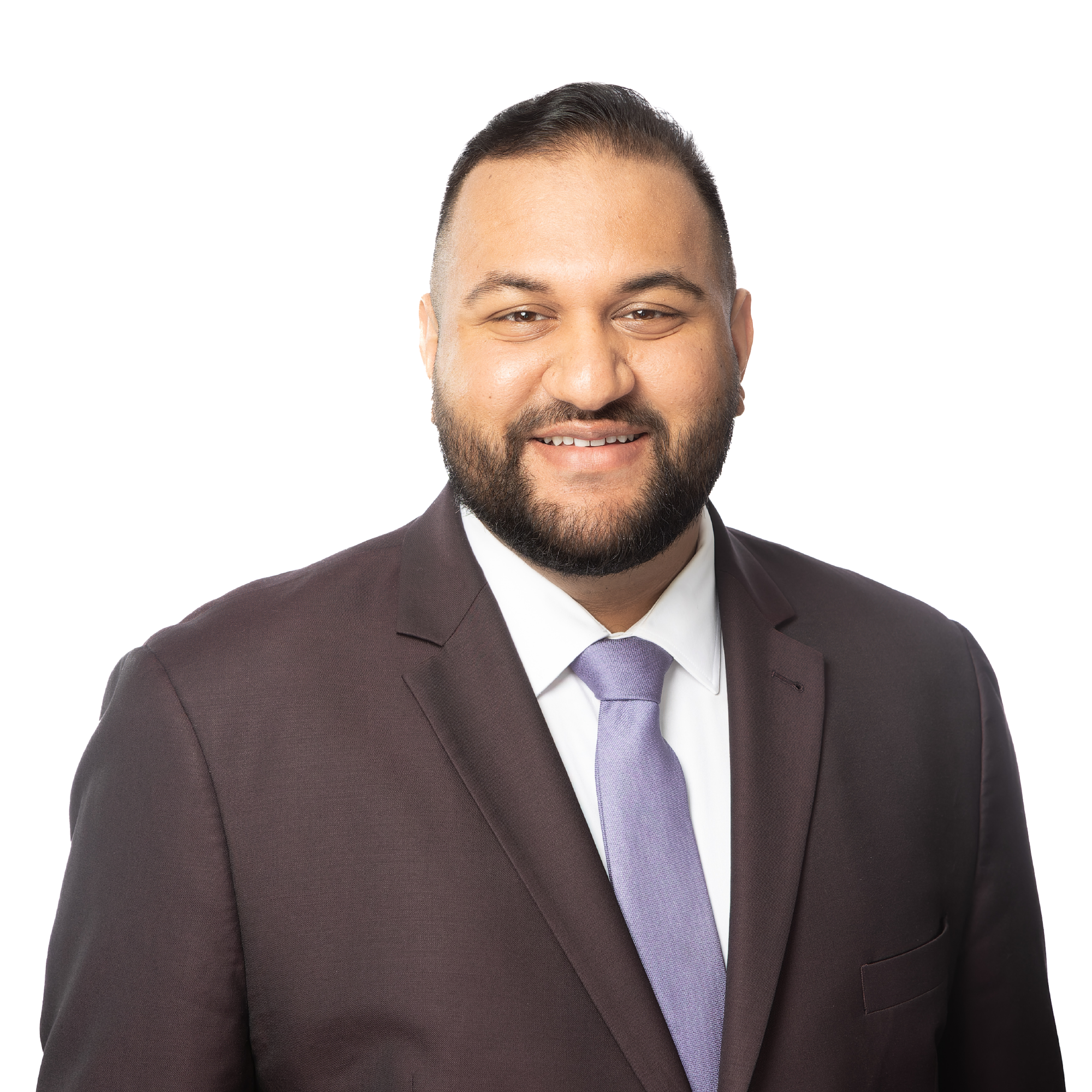
- Parmar in 2023

Minister of Forests of British Columbia
- In office November 18, 2024 – November 20, 2026
- Premier: David Eby
- Preceded by: Bruce Ralston
- Succeeded by: Kiel Giddens

Parliamentary Secretary for International Credentials of British Columbia
- In office February 20, 2024 – September 21, 2024
- Premier: David Eby
- Preceded by: George Chow
- Succeeded by: Sunita Dhir

Member of the British Columbia Legislative Assembly for Langford-Highlands Langford-Juan de Fuca (2023–2024)
- Incumbent
- Assumed office June 24, 2023
- Preceded by: John Horgan

Personal details
- Born: November 15, 1994 (age 32)
- Party: BC NDP
- Education: University of Victoria

Ravi Singh Parmar MLA (born November 15, 1994) is a Canadian politician who has served as a member of the Legislative Assembly of British Columbia (MLA) since winning a by-election in 2023. A member of the New Democratic Party, he succeeded former premier John Horgan in the electoral district of Langford-Juan de Fuca until its redistribution in 2024, after which he was re-elected in Langford-Highlands. Currently, he is the youngest MLA in British Columbia. He also served as the Minister of Forests for British Columbia.

Prior to provincial politics, Parmar served as a School District 62 Sooke Board Trustee from 2014 to 2017, before becoming Board Chair. Parmar also worked as a Ministerial Advisor and Chief of Staff to various provincial ministers, including the Minister of Jobs, Economic Recovery, and Innovation and the Minister of Forests.

== Early life and education ==
In the early 1990s, Parmar's parents immigrated to Canada from their home country of India. Both his mother and father worked in the healthcare sector while raising Parmar and his two younger siblings in the city of Langford, British Columbia. Both parents experienced severe job insecurity due to the active privatization of the healthcare sector, resulting in difficult times for the family. Parmar cites this as his inspiration for entering government and politics.

In 2005, while in middle school, Parmar wrote an extra credit class assignment on that year's provincial election. For this project, he had reached out to then-MLA John Horgan to invite him to his class. Horgan obliged, igniting a longstanding mentor-mentee relationship between the two that persisted for years to come.

Parmar got his earnest start in community politics while still a teenager. He attended Belmont Secondary School where he authored a student petition and led a campus-wide walkout, both as means to get two new secondary schools approved for the West Shore region. The movement was successful, and the two schools came in the form of Royal Bay Secondary School in Colwood and an updated Belmont Secondary School on Langford Lake Road.

After graduating from Belmont, Parmar went on to study Political Science at the University of Victoria, earning his Bachelor of Arts. It was during his post-secondary studies that Parmar was first elected to the Sooke School District 62 Board of Education as a Trustee. At the time of his election to the Board in 2014 he was only 20 years old. Parmar ran on the promise that he would bring to this role the perspective of a recent consumer of the public education system.

Two years later Parmar was elected Chair of the Board. His priority as Chair was the opening of new schools in the western communities. During his tenure a 2,600 seat expansion of the local school system occurred. These seats came via the newly constructed PEXSISEṈ Elementary School and Centre Mountain Lellum Middle School, both of which are situated in the West Hills area of Langford.

Parmar had his first formal entry into government work, serving under former Premier John Horgan as a constituency assistant in his MLA office and as a campaign manager for several BC NDP candidates.

== Early career ==
Following his graduation, Parmar went on to work for the Government of British Columbia in various capacities. Most notably he was Chief of Staff to the Minister of Jobs, Economic Recovery, and Innovation, at the time Ravi Kahlon. Parmar was a key architect of the Stronger BC Economic Plan, which aimed to support small business and recuperate BC's economy following the COVID-19 pandemic.

Parmar's central role with Minister Kahlon came following work across various other ministries, including a position as Senior Ministerial Advisor in the Office of the Minister of Forests. During his time with Forests, Parmar worked closely with then-Minister Doug Donaldson on the development and rollout of BC's Mass Timber Action Plan.

== Political career ==
In March 2023 after announcing his intention to step down as MLA, Premier, and BC NDP Party Leader, then-Premier John Horgan formally resigned from his seat as MLA for Langford-Juan de Fuca. A by-election to fill the now vacant seat was thereafter called by succeeding Premier David Eby. Parmar won the nomination to run as John Horgan's replacement, as the BC NDP candidate for the riding.

On June 24, 2023, Parmar was successful in the by-election, winning 53% of the vote. He thus became the MLA for the riding of Langford-Juan de Fuca, the youngest in British Columbia. One month later on July 28, he was officially sworn in as MLA alongside fellow BC NDP by-election victor Joan Phillip.

In February 2024, Parmar was officially appointed to be Parliamentary Secretary for International Credentials with the Ministry of Post-Secondary Education and Future Skills, serving alongside Minister Lisa Beare. In this role, Parmar led the implementation of the BC Government's International Credentials Recognition Act, intended to streamline the pathway for professionals to enter the BC labour force with non-Canadian professional qualifications. Premier David Eby additionally assigned him to oversee the intake of international students in BC, with Parmar becoming an advocate for those seeking educational opportunities within the province. His culminated with the implementation of BC's International Education Framework.

Parmar was acclaimed in June 2024 to seek re-election in the new electoral district of Langford-Highlands, as the BC NDP candidate and incumbent MLA. . As candidate, he successfully held onto his seat in the 2024 British Columbia general election, receiving 11 444 of 22,062 votes.

Following the 2024 provincial election, in November, David Eby unveiled his newly configured Cabinet for BC. As part of the new council, Parmar was appointed Minister of Forests, taking over from retired Minister Bruce Ralston.

In 2025, Minister Parmar was appointed Chair of the Council of Canadian Forest Ministers. He led the Council through a tumultuous period centred around President Donald Trump's new tariffs on Canadian wood products and ongoing Canada–United States softwood lumber dispute. His tenure came to a close in June of 2026, at the Council of Canadian Forest Ministers Conference hosted in Langford, BC.

== Electoral history ==
2026 British Columbia general election: Langford-Highlands
Party	Candidate	Votes	%	±%	Expenditures
New Democratic	Ravi Parmar	9,522	44.67		
Conservative	Cindy Scott	8,260	38.75		
Green	Christopher Moon	2,810	13.18		
CentreBC	Sean Flynn	476	2.23	—	
Christian Heritage	Christian McCay	123	0.58	—	
Independent	Alex Thurlborn	105	0.49	—	
Total valid votes		21,296	99.92		
Total rejected ballots		18	0.08		
Turnout		21,314			
Registered voters					
New Democratic hold		Swing		−4.29	
Source: Elections BC

2024 British Columbia general election: Langford-Highlands
Party	Candidate	Votes	%	±%	Expenditures
New Democratic	Ravi Parmar	11,444	51.87	-15.1	$34,290.05
Conservative	Mike Harris	8,251	37.40	–	$51,484.01
Green	Erin Cassels	2,368	10.73	-5.3	$4,501.47
Total valid votes/expense limit		22,063	99.88	–	$71,700.08
Total rejected ballots		27	0.12	–	
Turnout		22,090	59.08	–	
Registered voters		37,389			
New Democratic notional hold		Swing		-26.3	
Source: Elections BC

British Columbia provincial by-election, June 24, 2023: Langford-Juan de Fuca Resignation of John Horgan
Party	Candidate	Votes	%	±%	Expenditures
New Democratic	Ravi Parmar	7,279	53.39	–14.50	$45,877.13
Conservative	Mike Harris	2,702	19.82	New	$13,528.90
Green	Camille Currie	2,405	17.64	+0.97	$63,446.56
BC United	Elena Lawson	1,173	8.60	–6.35	$63,827.41
Communist	Tyson Riel Strandlund	74	0.54	+0.05	$361.96
Total valid votes/expenses limit		13,633	99.97	—	$69,086.25
Total rejected ballots		4	0.03	–0.43	
Turnout		13,637	26.46	–28.89	
Registered voters		52,019			
New Democratic hold		Swing		–17.01	
Source: Elections BC

== See also ==
- 42nd Parliament of British Columbia
