= 2014 British Columbia New Democratic Party leadership election =

Canadian political party leadership election

- May 4, 2014
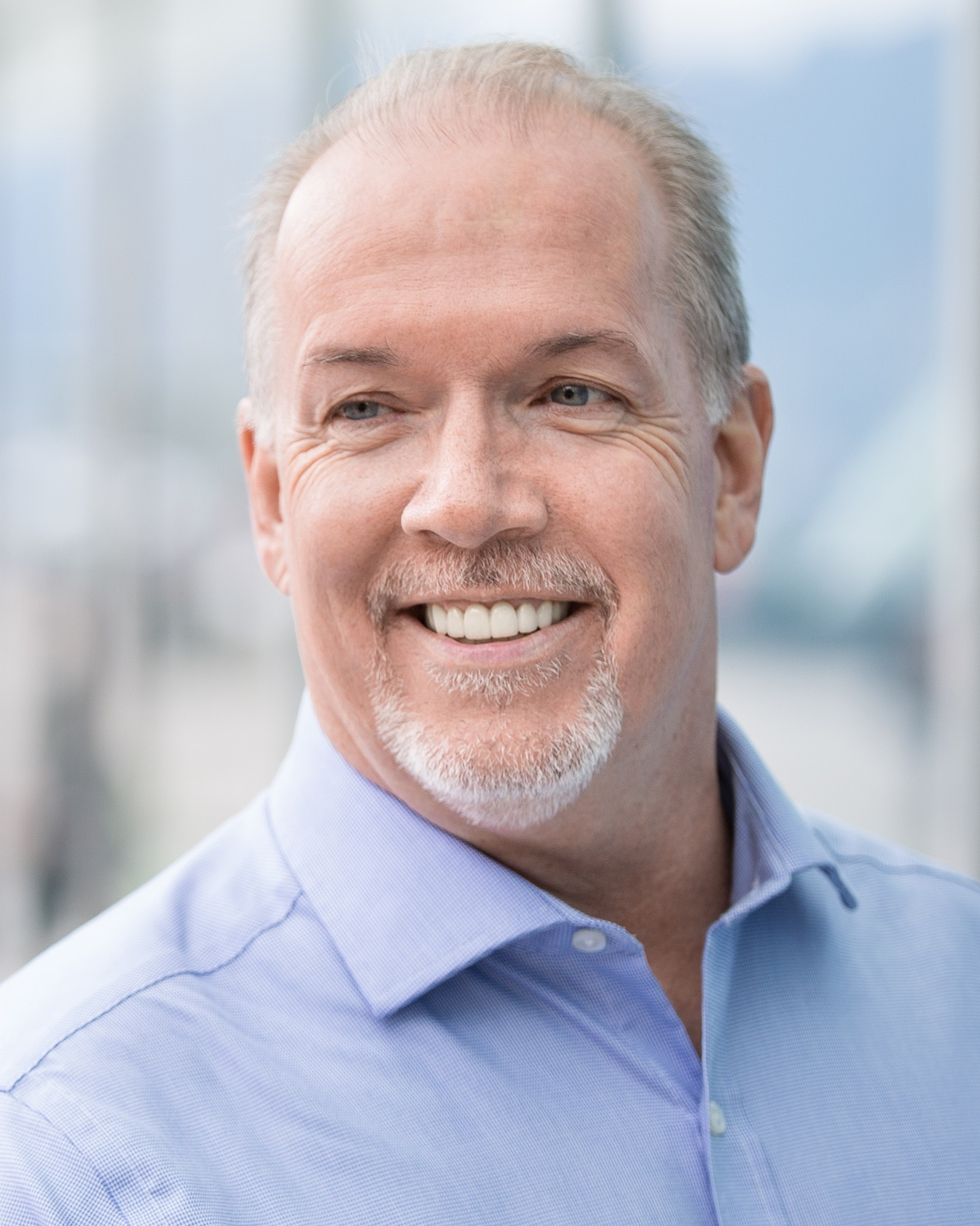
Candidate	John Horgan
First ballot	Acclaimed
Leader before election
Adrian Dix
Elected Leader
John Horgan

2014 British Columbia New Democratic Party leadership election
- Date: May 4, 2014
- Resigning leader: Adrian Dix
- Won by: John Horgan
- Ballots: 0 (acclamation)
- Candidates: 1
- Entrance fee: $25,000
- Spending limit: $350,000

In 2014, the British Columbia New Democratic Party scheduled a leadership election to select a new leader. The contest was called following Adrian Dix's resignation announcement on September 18, 2013, several months after the party's unexpected defeat in the 2013 election after pre-campaign polls had shown the NDP ahead by as much as 20 points. The election was to be held from September 24 to 27, with the results announced on September 28; however, as John Horgan was the only candidate to be officially nominated by the deadline of May 1, 2014, at 5 pm, he was acclaimed leader.

The party set the entrance fee for candidates at $25,000 and a spending maximum of $350,000.

The leadership vote was to be conducted by preferential ballot cast via internet and telephone, with all party members being eligible to vote. The voting was to occur from September 24 to 27, with the results announced on September 28. Unlike the previous leadership election, which was also conducted on a "one member, one vote" basis, members would not have had the option of voting at the convention itself or on a live ballot-by-ballot basis but could only cast a preferential ballot and do so by internet or phone.

The deadline for candidates to be nominated was May 1, 2014. The deadline to join the NDP and be eligible to vote was to be June 26, 2014.

== Timeline ==
- May 14, 2013 – NDP fails to win provincial election, dropping by two seats, despite having led the Liberals in polling prior to the election campaign.
- September 18, 2013 – Adrian Dix announces his decision to resign as leader once his successor is chosen.
- January 18–19, 2014 – NDP executive decides on rules and timeline for leadership election to be held September 28, 2014.
- March 2, 2014 – NDP Finance Critic Mike Farnworth announces his candidacy.
- March 17, 2014 – NDP Education Critic John Horgan declares his candidacy.
- April 8, 2014 – Farnworth withdraws, endorses Horgan.
- May 1, 2014 – Deadline for candidates to be nominated; Horgan acclaimed NDP leader.
- May 4, 2014 – Horgan officially inaugurated as NDP leader.

== Candidates ==
=== John Horgan ===
MLA for Juan de Fuca since 2005, Horgan had been Opposition Critic for Education and, until his candidacy was announced, he was Opposition Energy Critic (2006–2014) and Opposition House Leader (2011–2014). Horgan ran in the 2011 leadership election, placing third.

Support from caucus members: Carole James, Harry Bains, Mable Elmore, David Eby, Michelle Mungall, Selina Robinson, Sue Hammell, Maurine Karagianis, Bill Routley, Raj Chouhan Robin Austin, Judy Darcy, Kathy Corrigan, Scott Fraser, Jane Shin, Claire Trevena
Support from federal caucus members: Fin Donnelly
Support from former caucus members: Dawn Black, Joe Trasolini
Date candidacy declared: March 17, 2014
Policies:

== Withdrawn candidates ==
=== Mike Farnworth ===
Farnworth was MLA for Port Coquitlam (1991–2001, 2005–present), Opposition Finance Critic, former Minister of Municipal Affairs and Housing (1997–98), Minister of Employment and Investment and Minister Responsible for Housing (1998–2000), Minister of Health and Minister Responsible for Seniors (2000), and Minister Social Development and Economic Security (2000–01). He placed second in the 2011 leadership election.

Support from caucus members: Lana Popham, Doug Donaldson, Norm Macdonald
Support from federal caucus members:
Support from former caucus members:
Date candidacy declared: March 2, 2014
Date withdrawn: April 8, 2014
Reason: Farnworth withdrew, conceding that he could not beat Horgan, who had amassed the support of over half the NDP's 34-member caucus. He had not officially registered his candidacy prior to deciding not to run.

== Potential candidates who declined to run ==
MLAs Rob Fleming, David Eby, Judy Darcy and George Heyman, federal MPs Kennedy Stewart, Nathan Cullen, Fin Donnelly and Peter Julian, mayors Derek Corrigan and Gregor Robertson and Vancouver School Board chairperson Patti Bacchus all announced that they will not be candidates for the party leadership.
