= Langford-Highlands =

Provincial electoral district in British Columbia, Canada

British Columbia electoral district
- Location in Greater Victoria

Provincial electoral district
- Legislature: Legislative Assembly of British Columbia
MLA
Ravi Parmar
New Democratic
- District created: 2021
- First contested: 2024
- Last contested: 2026

Langford-Highlands is a provincial electoral district for the Legislative Assembly of British Columbia, Canada. Created under the 2021 British Columbia electoral redistribution, the riding was first contested in the 2024 British Columbia general election. It was mostly created out of Langford-Juan de Fuca plus a small part of Esquimalt-Metchosin.

== Geography ==
The district is located in Greater Victoria's Western Communities and is coterminal with the municipal boundaries of the city of Langford and the District of Highlands.

== Members of the Legislative Assembly ==
Assembly	Years	Member	Party
Langford-Highlands; Riding created from Esquimalt-Metchosin and Langford-Juan de Fuca
43rd	2024–2026	Ravi Parmar	New Democratic
44th	2026–present	Ravi Parmar	New Democratic

== Election results ==
2026 British Columbia general election
Party	Candidate	Votes	%	±%	Expenditures
New Democratic	Ravi Parmar	8,737	44.72	-7.15	
Conservative	Cindy Scott	7,588	38.84	+1.44	
Green	Christopher Moon	2,550	13.05	+2.32	
CentreBC	Sean Flynn	430	2.20	–	
Christian Heritage	Christian McCay	115	0.59	–	
Independent	Alex Thurlborn	99	0.51	–	
Total valid votes		19,519	99.91		
Total rejected ballots		17	0.09		
Turnout					
Registered voters					
New Democratic hold		Swing		-4.29	
Source: Elections BC

2024 British Columbia general election
Party	Candidate	Votes	%	±%	Expenditures
New Democratic	Ravi Parmar	11,444	51.87	-15.1	$34,290.05
Conservative	Mike Harris	8,251	37.40	–	$51,484.01
Green	Erin Cassels	2,368	10.73	-5.3	$4,501.47
Total valid votes/expense limit		22,063	99.88	–	$71,700.08
Total rejected ballots		27	0.12	–	
Turnout		22,090	59.08	–	
Registered voters		37,389			
New Democratic notional hold		Swing		-26.3	
Source: Elections BC

2020 provincial election redistributed results
Party	%
New Democratic	67.0
Liberal	16.5
Green	16.0

== See also ==
- List of British Columbia provincial electoral districts
- Canadian provincial electoral districts
