= Juan de Fuca-Malahat =

Provincial electoral district in British Columbia, Canada

British Columbia electoral district
- Interactive map of riding boundaries

Provincial electoral district
- Legislature: Legislative Assembly of British Columbia
MLA
Mike Hicks
Conservative
- District created: 2023
- First contested: 2024
- Last contested: 2026

Demographics
- Population (2021): 44,980
- Area (km²): 3,116
- Pop. density (per km²): 14.4
- Census division(s): Capital, Cowichan Valley
- Census subdivision(s): Metchosin, Sooke, Becher Bay, Cowichan, Malahat, T'Sou-ke

Juan de Fuca-Malahat is a provincial electoral district in British Columbia that has been represented in the Legislative Assembly of British Columbia since 2024.

Created under the 2021 British Columbia electoral redistribution, it has near-identical boundaries to the former electoral district of Malahat-Juan de Fuca, which existed from 1991 to 2009.

== Geography ==
The district comprises the southern tip of Vancouver Island, including the communities of Sooke, Metchosin, Malahat, Shawnigan Lake, Cobble Hill, and Mill Bay, and extending east as far as Port Renfrew. It is bounded by the Saanich Inlet and Trans-Canada Highway to the east, and the Strait of Juan de Fuca to the south.

== Demographics ==
Population, 2021	44,980
Area (km^{2})	3,116
Pop. density (people per km^{2})	14
Source: BC Electoral Boundaries Commission

== History ==
Malahat-Juan de Fuca was created prior to the 1991 election from parts of Esquimalt-Port Renfrew and Cowichan-Malahat, and it was contested from 1991 to 2009. The district was abolished in the 2008 British Columbia electoral redistribution, with its territory being allocated between Juan de Fuca and Cowichan Valley.

The riding was re-established in 2023 as one of six new electoral districts in the province following the results of the 2021 British Columbia electoral redistribution. It was created out of parts of Langford-Juan de Fuca, Cowichan Valley and Esquimalt-Metchosin.

== Members of the Legislative Assembly ==
This district has elected the following members of the Legislative Assembly:

Assembly	Years	Member	Party
Malahat-Juan de Fuca; Riding created from Cowichan-Malahat and Esquimalt-Port Renfrew
35th	1991–1996	Rick Kasper	New Democratic
36th	1996–2001	Rick Kasper	New Democratic
36th	2001–2001	Rick Kasper	Independent
37th	2001–2005	Brian Kerr	Liberal
38th	2005–2009	John Horgan	New Democratic
Riding dissolved into Juan de Fuca and Cowichan Valley
Juan de Fuca-Malahat; Riding re-created from Cowichan Valley, Esquimalt-Metchosin, and Langford-Juan de Fuca
43rd	2024–2026	Dana Lajeunesse	New Democratic
44th	2026–present	Mike Hicks	Conservative

== Election results ==
=== Juan de Fuca-Malahat ===
2026 British Columbia general election
The 2026 general election will be held on October 24.
Party	Candidate	Votes	%	±%	Expenditures
Christian Heritage	Jeff Brown				
Green	David Evans				
OneBC	Shane Friesen				
Conservative	Mike Hicks				
New Democratic	Dana Lajeunesse				
Total valid votes					
Total rejected ballots					
Turnout					
Registered voters					
Source: Elections BC

2024 British Columbia general election
Party	Candidate	Votes	%	±%	Expenditures
New Democratic	Dana Lajeunesse	9,308	38.79	-13.4	$46,931.79
Conservative	Marina Sapozhnikov	9,167	38.20	–	$18,521.77
Green	David Evans	5,522	23.01	-10.4	$31,663.56
Total valid votes/expense limit		23,997	99.87	–	$71,700.08
Total rejected ballots		32	0.13	–	
Turnout		24,029	64.81	–	
Registered voters		37,078			
New Democratic notional hold		Swing		-25.8	
Source: Elections BC

2020 provincial election redistributed results
Party	%
New Democratic	52.2
Green	33.4
Liberal	14.0

=== Malahat-Juan de Fuca ===
B.C. General Election 1991: Malahat-Juan de Fuca
Party	Candidate	Votes	%	±	Expenditures
NDP	Rick Kasper	8,579	44.18%		$50,715
Liberal	Tom Morino	7,639	39.34%		$8,288
Social Credit	R. E. Bob Clark	2,628	13.53%	–	$38,891
Green	Beverley A. Holden	380	1.96%	–	$2,481
Western Canada Concept	Richard (Dick) Lewers	125	0.64%		$16
Human Race	Louis J. Lesosky	68	0.35%		$12
Total valid votes		19,419	100.00%		
Total rejected ballots		432	2.18%		
Turnout		19,851	76.82%		

B.C. General Election 1996: Malahat-Juan de Fuca
Party	Candidate	Votes	%	±	Expenditures
NDP	Rick Kasper	10,686	48.63%		$40,758
Liberal	Mike Elcock	7,556	34.39%		$43,672
Reform	Bill Cools	1,887	8.59%		$19,769
Progressive Democrat	Donna Launay	1,061	4.83%	–	$100
Green	Beverley Holden	601	2.74%	–	$150
Independent	Louis James Lesosky	98	0.45%		$124
Western Canada Concept	Dode French	84	0.38%		$100
Total valid votes		21,973	100.00%		
Total rejected ballots		106	0.48%		
Turnout		22,079	72.91%		

B.C. General Election 2001: Malahat-Juan de Fuca
Party	Candidate	Votes	%	±	Expenditures
Liberal	Brian Kerr	9,676	42.26%		$49,752
Independent	Rick Kasper	5,164	22.56%		$31,524
NDP	Richard Hughes	3,687	16.10%		$34,924
Green	Stephen Bradley	3,275	14.31%	–	$7,152
Marijuana	Ron Anderton	547	2.39%		$100
Unity	Julie L. M. Mander	323	1.41%		$3,071
Conservative	Susan Power	222	0.97%		
Total valid votes		22,894	100.00%		
Total rejected ballots		93	0.41%		
Turnout		22,987	73.57%		

2005 British Columbia general election: Malahat-Juan de Fuca
Party	Candidate	Votes	%	Expenditures
New Democratic	John Horgan	12,460	46.09	$42,953
Liberal	Cathy Basskin	10,528	38.94	$24,538
Green	Steven Hurdle	2,610	9.65	$1,488
Democratic Reform	Tom Morino	1,256	4.65	$2,775
Western Canada Concept	Pattie O'Brien	180	0.67	$100
Total valid votes		27,034	100	
Total rejected ballots		128	0.47	
Turnout		27,162	69.57	

== See also ==
- List of British Columbia provincial electoral districts
- Canadian provincial electoral districts
