= Brian Kerr (politician) =

Canadian politician

Member of the British Columbia Legislative Assembly for Malahat-Juan de Fuca
- In office May 16, 2001 – May 17, 2005
- Preceded by: Rick Kasper
- Succeeded by: John Horgan

Personal details
- Born: 1945 (age 80–81)
- Party: BC Liberal
- Occupation: Politician; businessman

Brian Kerr is Canadian retired politician and businessman who served as a member of the Legislative Assembly of British Columbia, representing the riding of Malahat-Juan de Fuca from 2001 to 2005.
