= Rick Kasper =

Canadian politician

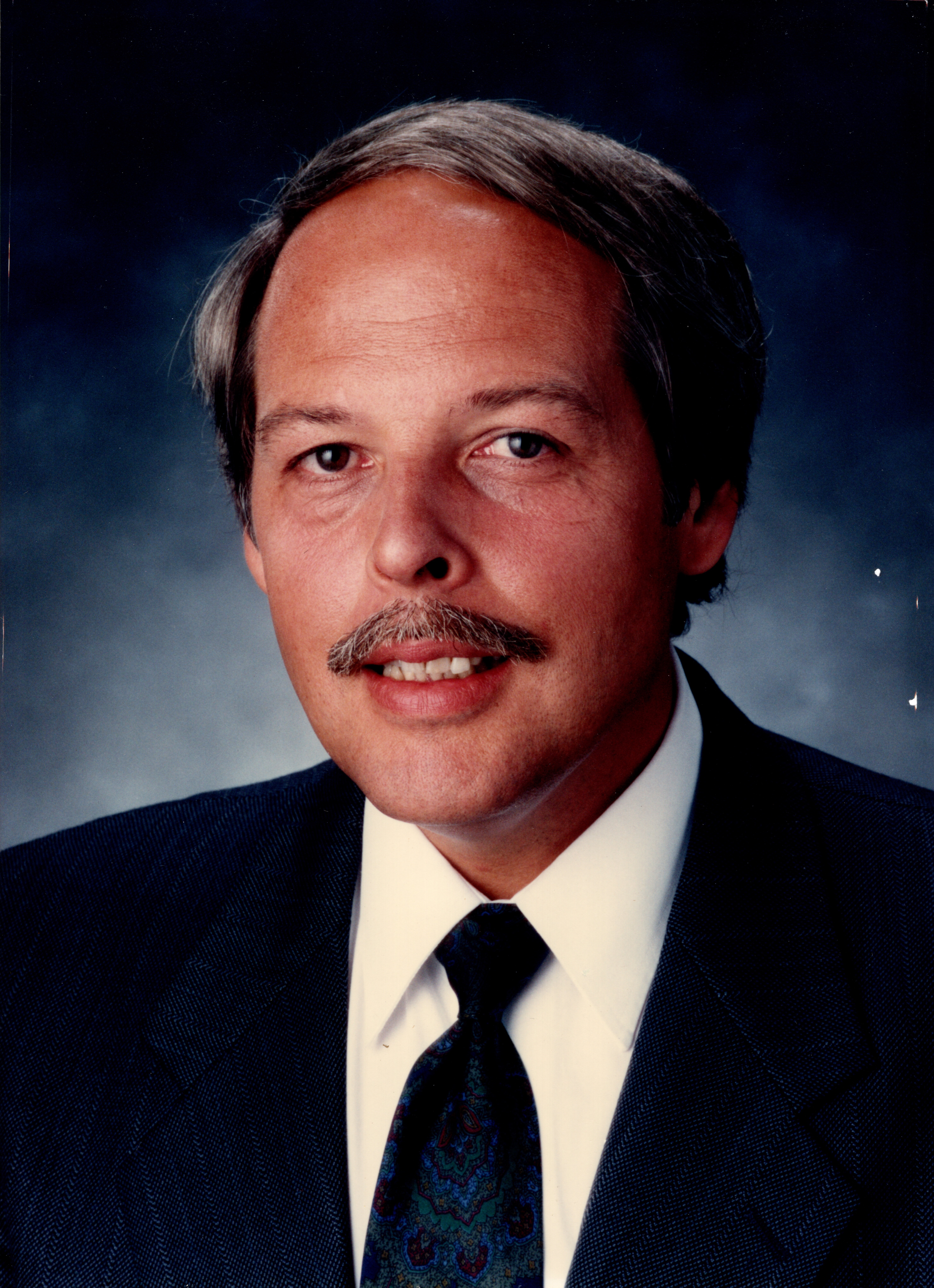

Member of the British Columbia Legislative Assembly for Malahat-Juan de Fuca
- In office October 17, 1991 – April 18, 2001
- Preceded by: Riding established
- Succeeded by: Brian Kerr

Personal details
- Party: Independent (2000–present)
- Other political affiliations: New Democratic (until 2000)

Rick F. G. Kasper (born 1951 or 1952) is a Canadian retired politician, bricklayer, and stonemason who served as a member of the Legislative Assembly of British Columbia (MLA), represented the riding of Malahat-Juan de Fuca from 1991 to 2001. Initially a member of the New Democratic Party (NDP), he later left the party and sat as an independent in 2000.

== Early life and career ==
Kasper studied at the Pacific Vocational Institute and became a bricklayer. He later became a member of the Capital Regional District board, representing Langford for nine years.

Kasper ran in the 1991 British Columbia general election as a member of the BC NDP in the riding of Malahat-Juan de Fuca. During his time in office he served as parliamentary secretary to several ministers. Kasper was later defeated by Brian Kerr when he ran for reelection as an independent in 2001.

After his time in provincial politics, Kasper served as municipal councillor for Sooke from 2005 to 2008 and was elected again in 2011.
