= Mike Hicks (Canadian politician) =

Canadian politician

Mike Hicks MLA

Member of the British Columbia Legislative Assembly for Juan de Fuca-Malahat
- Incumbent
- Assumed office October 24, 2026
- Preceded by: Dana Lajeunesse

Personal details
- Party: BC Conservative

Mike Hicks MLA is a Canadian politician who has served as a member of the Legislative Assembly of British Columbia (MLA) representing the electoral district of Juan de Fuca-Malahat since 2026. A member of the Conservative Party, he previously served as a director on the Capital Regional District.

== Political career ==
Before entering provincial politics, Hicks was served as a director on the Capital Regional District.

Hicks ran as the Conservative Party candidate to run in the electoral district of Juan de Fuca-Malahat during the 2026 provincial election. He went on to defeat incumbent New Democratic MLA Dana Lajeunesse.

== Electoral history ==
2026 British Columbia general election: Juan de Fuca-Malahat
** Preliminary results — Not yet official **
Party	Candidate	Votes	%	±%
Conservative	Mike Hicks	9,246	41.62	+3.42
New Democratic	Dana Lajeunesse	8,478	38.16	-0.63
Green	David Evans	3,880	17.46	-5.55
OneBC	Shane Friesen	553	2.49	
Christian Heritage	Jeff Brown	60	0.27	
Total valid votes		22,217	99.91	
Total rejected ballots		19	0.09	-0.05
Turnout		22,236		
Registered voters				
Source: Elections BC
Conservative gain from New Democratic		Swing		+2.02
