= 2023 Langford-Juan de Fuca provincial by-election =

Provincial by-election in British Columbia, Canada

2023 Langford-Juan de Fuca by-election
- June 24, 2023

Riding of Langford-Juan de Fuca
- Turnout: 26.46% (▼28.89 pp)
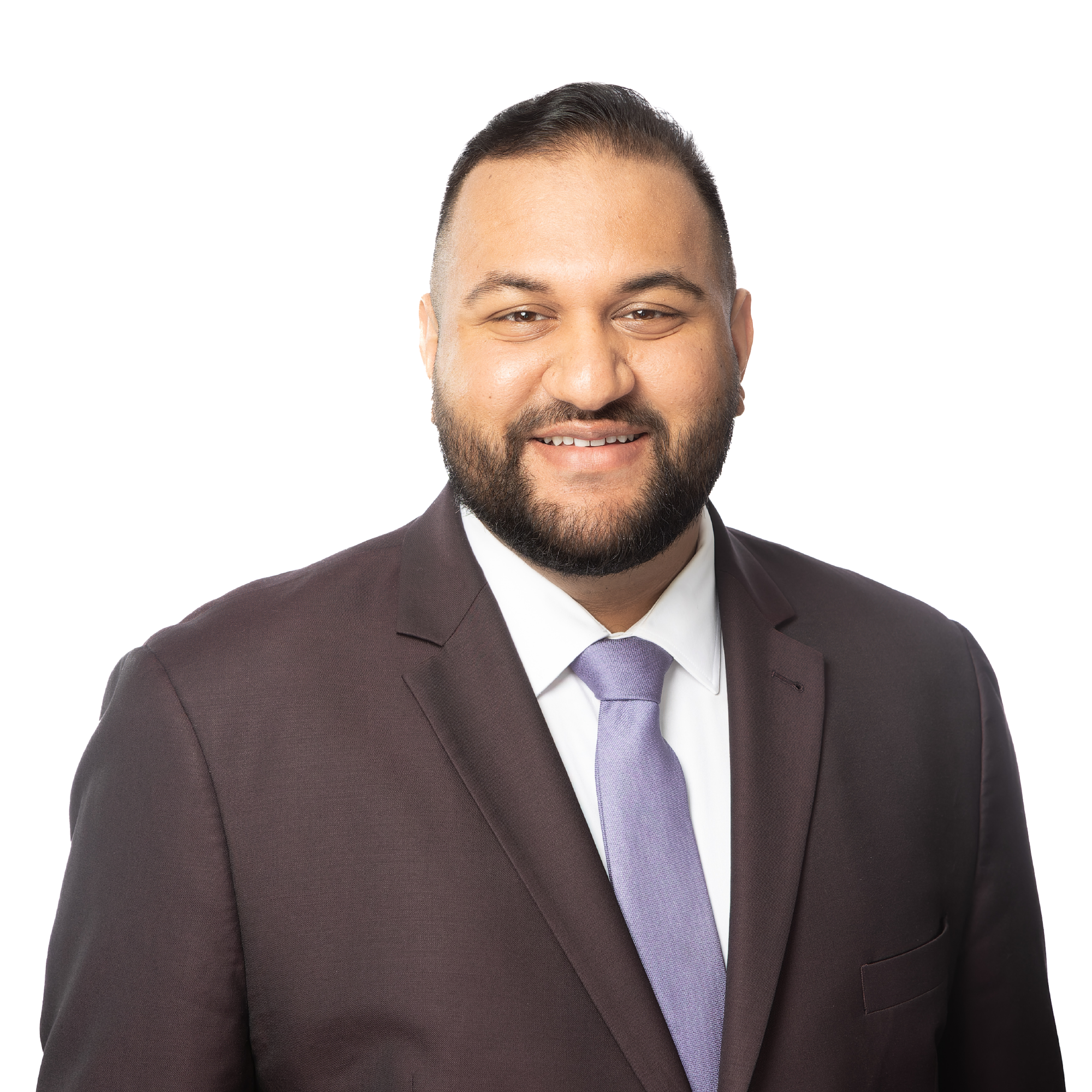
	First party	Second party
		CON
Candidate	Ravi Parmar	Mike Harris
Party	New Democratic	Conservative
Last election	67.89%	Did not run
Popular vote	7,279	2,702
Percentage	53.39%	19.82%
Swing	▼14.50 pp	N/A
	Third party	Fourth party
	GRN	BCU
Candidate	Camille Currie	Elena Lawson
Party	Green	BC United
Last election	16.67%	14.95%
Popular vote	2,405	1,173
Percentage	17.64%	8.60%
Swing	▲0.97 pp	▼6.35 pp
MLA before election
John Horgan
New Democratic
Elected MLA
Ravi Parmar
New Democratic

A by-election was held in the provincial riding of Langford-Juan de Fuca in British Columbia on June 24, 2023, to elect a new member of the Legislative Assembly of British Columbia following the resignation of NDP premier John Horgan. Advance voting was held June 16 to 21.

The by-election was held on the same day as one in Vancouver-Mount Pleasant.

== Background ==
New Democratic MLA John Horgan had represented Langford-Juan de Fuca in the Legislative Assembly since the 2005 provincial election and served as Premier of British Columbia from 2017 to 2022. He was re-elected in 2020.

Following his resignation as premier due to health concerns, Horgan announced on February 9, 2023, that he would resign as an MLA and retire from politics. Horgan's resignation took effect on March 31, 2023, creating a vacancy in the riding.

On May 27, 2023, Premier David Eby called the by-election for June 24, 2023, alongside a by-election in Vancouver-Mount Pleasant.

== Constituency ==
Located on the south coast of Vancouver Island, along the Strait of Juan de Fuca, the district comprised the western communities of the Capital Regional District, including Langford, Sooke and Highlands.

== Candidates ==
- Camille Currie (Green), founder and president of BC Health Care Matters
- Mike Harris (Conservative), real estate agent
- Elena Lawson (United), autism advocate
- Ravi Parmar (New Democrat), Sooke School District chair
- Tyson Riel Strandlund (Communist), non-profit regional director

== Result ==
British Columbia provincial by-election, June 24, 2023: Langford-Juan de Fuca Resignation of John Horgan
Party	Candidate	Votes	%	±%	Expenditures
New Democratic	Ravi Parmar	7,279	53.39	–14.50	$45,877.13
Conservative	Mike Harris	2,702	19.82	New	$13,528.90
Green	Camille Currie	2,405	17.64	+0.97	$63,446.56
BC United	Elena Lawson	1,173	8.60	–6.35	$63,827.41
Communist	Tyson Riel Strandlund	74	0.54	+0.05	$361.96
Total valid votes/expenses limit		13,633	99.97	—	$69,086.25
Total rejected ballots		4	0.03	–0.43	
Turnout		13,637	26.46	–28.89	
Registered voters		52,019			
New Democratic hold		Swing		–17.01	
Source: Elections BC

== Previous result ==
2020 British Columbia general election: Langford-Juan de Fuca
Party	Candidate	Votes	%	±%	Expenditures
New Democratic	John Horgan	18,073	67.89	+15.14	$29,254.09
Green	Gord Baird	4,437	16.67	−2.46	$15,772.59
Liberal	Kelly Darwin	3,980	14.95	−11.15	$3,601.34
Communist	Tyson Riel Strandlund	130	0.49	–	$123.40
Total valid votes		26,620	99.54	–	
Total rejected ballots		122	0.46	+0.03	
Turnout		26,742	55.35	–6.76	
Registered voters		48,316			
New Democratic hold		Swing		+8.80	
Source: Elections BC

== See also ==
- List of British Columbia by-elections
