= Langford-Juan de Fuca =

Former provincial electoral district in British Columbia

British Columbia electoral district
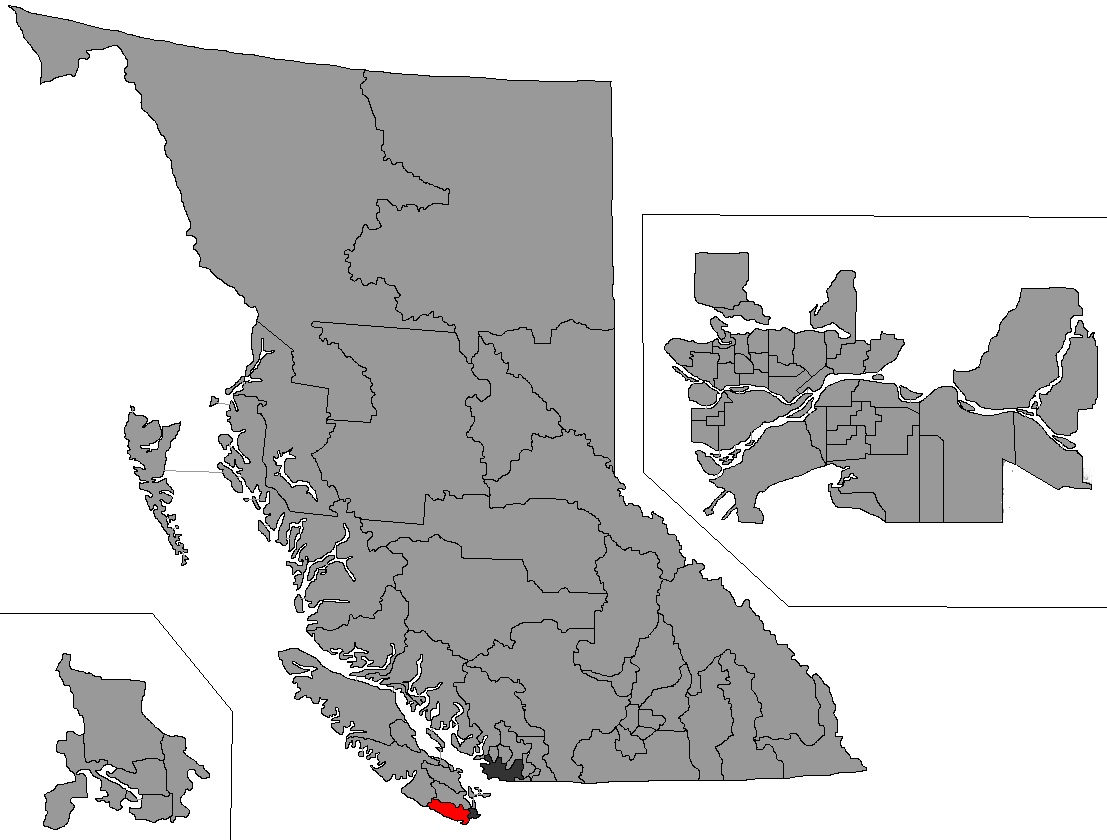

Defunct provincial electoral district
- Legislature: Legislative Assembly of British Columbia
- District created: 2008
- District abolished: 2024
- First contested: 2009
- Last contested: 2023

Demographics
- Population (2014): 51,782
- Area (km²): 2,447
- Census division: Capital
- Census subdivision(s): Gordon River 2, Highlands, Juan de Fuca, Langford, Sooke, T'Soo-ke

Langford-Juan de Fuca (name from 2017 to 2024) or Juan de Fuca (name from 2009 to 2017) is a former provincial electoral district for the Legislative Assembly of British Columbia in Canada. It was located on the south coast of Vancouver Island, along the Juan de Fuca Strait. It contains the western Victoria suburbs of Langford, Sooke and Highlands.

== History ==
The electoral district of Juan de Fuca was created in the 2008 redistribution out of the ridings of Malahat-Juan de Fuca and Esquimalt-Metchosin. It was first contested in the 2009 general election, in which New Democrat John Horgan was elected MLA.

It was renamed Langford-Juan de Fuca in the 2015 redistribution and lost some territory to Esquimalt-Metchosin.

A by-election to replace John Horgan took place June 24, 2023.

Under the 2021 British Columbia electoral redistribution that took effect for the 2024 election, the electoral boundaries of Greater Victoria's Western Communities were substantially realigned to add a new district. Langford-Juan de Fuca was divided, with Sooke and the Juan de Fuca communities redistributed to the new district of Juan de Fuca-Malahat while the majority of the district's population in Langford and Highlands redistributed to the new district of Langford-Highlands.

== MLAs ==
Langford-Juan de Fuca
Assembly	Years	Member	Party
Juan de Fuca; Riding created from Malahat-Juan de Fuca and Esquimalt-Metchosin
39th	2009–2013	John Horgan	New Democratic
40th	2013–2017	John Horgan	New Democratic
Langford-Juan de Fuca
41st	2017–2020	John Horgan	New Democratic
42nd	2020–2023	John Horgan	New Democratic
42nd	2023–2024	Ravi Parmar	New Democratic

== Election results ==
=== Langford-Juan de Fuca ===
British Columbia provincial by-election, June 24, 2023 Resignation of John Horgan
Party	Candidate	Votes	%	±%	Expenditures
New Democratic	Ravi Parmar	7,279	53.39	–14.50	$45,877.13
Conservative	Mike Harris	2,702	19.82	New	$13,528.90
Green	Camille Currie	2,405	17.64	+0.97	$63,446.56
BC United	Elena Lawson	1,173	8.60	–6.35	$63,827.41
Communist	Tyson Riel Strandlund	74	0.54	+0.05	$361.96
Total valid votes/expenses limit		13,633	99.97	—	$69,086.25
Total rejected ballots		4	0.03	–0.43	
Turnout		13,637	26.46	–28.89	
Registered voters		52,019			
New Democratic hold		Swing		–17.01	
Source: Elections BC

2020 British Columbia general election
Party	Candidate	Votes	%	±%	Expenditures
New Democratic	John Horgan	18,073	67.89	+15.14	$29,254.09
Green	Gord Baird	4,437	16.67	−2.46	$15,772.59
Liberal	Kelly Darwin	3,980	14.95	−11.15	$3,601.34
Communist	Tyson Riel Strandlund	130	0.49	–	$123.40
Total valid votes		26,620	99.54	–	
Total rejected ballots		122	0.46	+0.03	
Turnout		26,742	55.35	–6.76	
Registered voters		48,316			
New Democratic hold		Swing		+8.80	
Source: Elections BC

2017 British Columbia general election
Party	Candidate	Votes	%	±%	Expenditures
New Democratic	John Horgan	13,224	52.75	-0.56	$57,955
Liberal	Cathy Noel	6,544	26.11	-4.66	$59,254
Green	Brendan Ralfs	4,795	19.13	+3.22	$5,406
Libertarian	Scott Burton	262	1.05		$202
Vancouver Island Party	Willie Nelson	242	0.97		$0
Total valid votes		25,067	99.57		
Total rejected ballots		108	0.43	+0.04	
Turnout		25,175	62.11	+4.04	
Registered voters		40,532			
New Democratic hold		Swing		+2.05	
Source: Elections BC

=== Juan de Fuca ===
2013 British Columbia general election: Juan de Fuca
Party	Candidate	Votes	%	±%	Expenditures
New Democratic	John Horgan	12,338	53.32	−3.89	$97,977
Liberal	Kerrie Reay	7,120	30.77	−3.33	$19,846
Green	Carlos Serra	3,682	15.91	+7.23	$812
Total valid votes		23,140	99.61		
Total rejected ballots		91	0.39	-0.14	
Turnout		23,231	58.07	-1.79	
Registered voters		40,002			
New Democratic hold		Swing		-0.28	
Source: Elections BC

2009 British Columbia general election: Juan de Fuca
Party	Candidate	Votes	%	Expenditures
New Democratic	John Horgan	11,520	57.21	$73,822
Liberal	Jody Twa	6,866	34.10	$149,286
Green	James Powell	1,749	8.69	$1,635
Total valid votes		20,135	99.47	
Total rejected ballots		107	0.53	
Turnout		20,242	59.87	
Registered voters		33,812		

Legislative Assembly of British Columbia
Preceded by Westside-Kelowna	Constituency represented by the premier 2017–2022	Succeeded by Vancouver-Point Grey
