= Janet Austin =

Lieutenant Governor of British Columbia from 2018 to 2025

The Honourable Janet Austin OBC
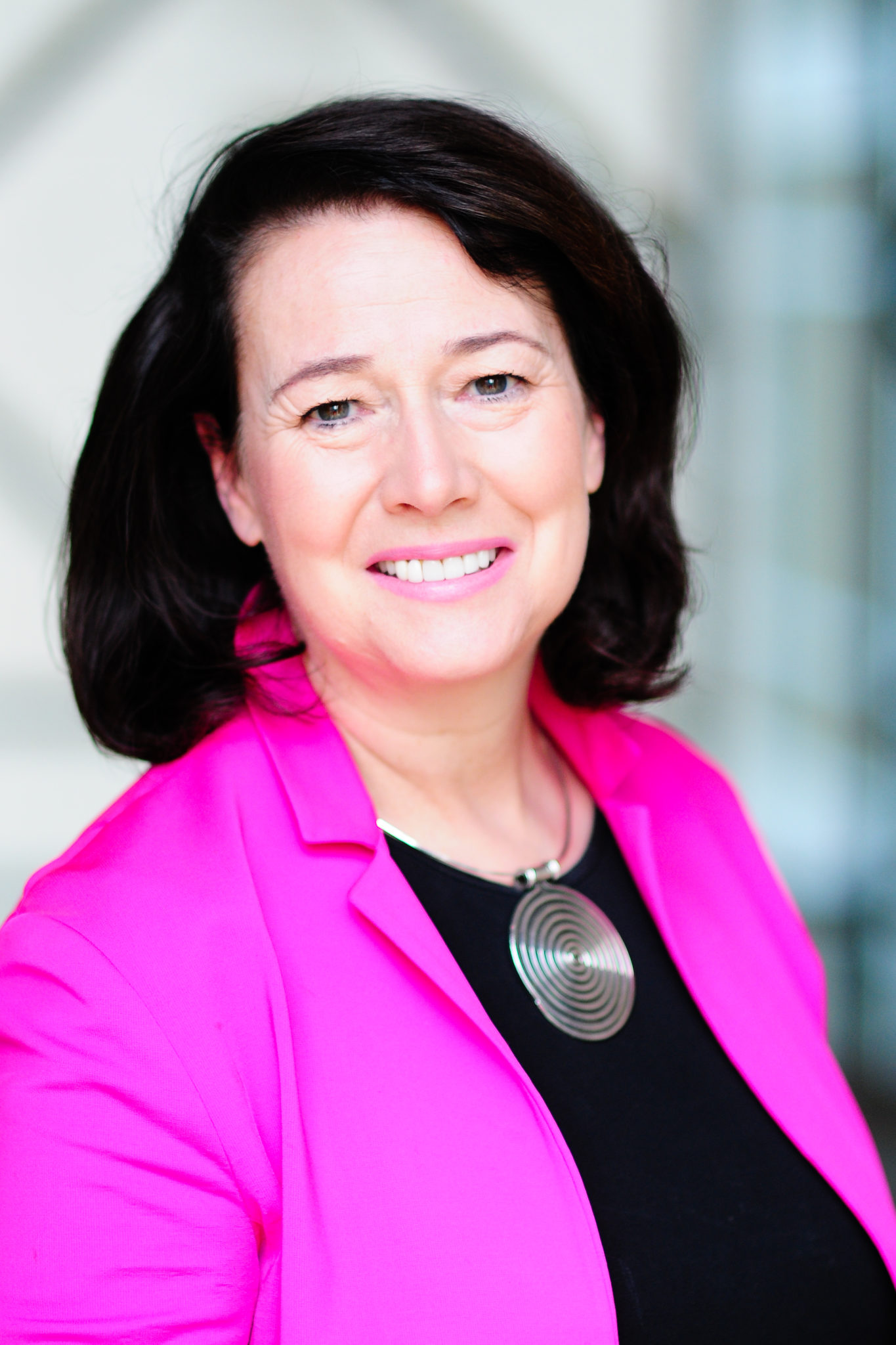
- Austin in 2014

30th Lieutenant Governor of British Columbia
- In office April 24, 2018 – January 30, 2025
- Monarchs: Elizabeth II; Charles III
- Governors General: Julie Payette; Mary Simon
- Premier: John Horgan; David Eby
- Preceded by: Judith Guichon
- Succeeded by: Wendy Lisogar-Cocchia

Personal details
- Born: 1956 or 1957 (age 69–70) Calgary, Alberta, Canada
- Spouse: Ashley Chester
- Education: University of Calgary

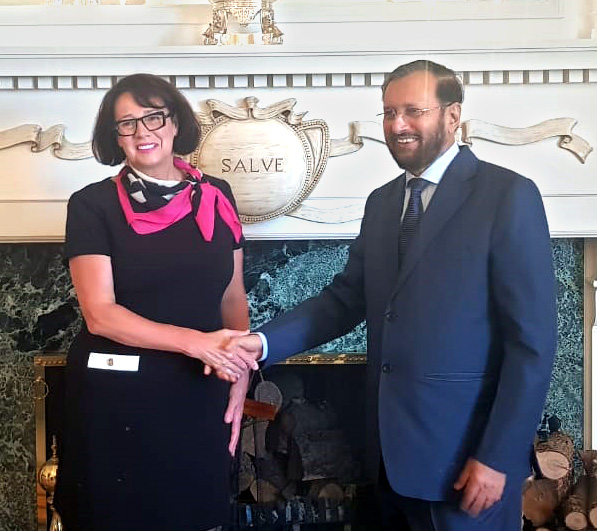
Austin meeting the Indian politician Prakash Javadekar in 2018

Janet Edna Merivale Austin OBC (born 1956 or 1957) was the 30th lieutenant governor of British Columbia, having served from 2018 to 2025. She was the viceregal representative of Queen Elizabeth II and King Charles III in the province of British Columbia.

Austin was appointed by Governor General Julie Payette, on the advice of Prime Minister Justin Trudeau.

She is also a former nonprofit sector executive and public servant who spent 15 years as CEO of YWCA Metro Vancouver, as well serving on the boards of the Council for Early Child Development, the Women's Health Research Institute and the Dr. Peter AIDS Foundation.

== Honours ==

Ribbon	Description	Notes	Refs.
	Order of British Columbia		
	Queen Elizabeth II Golden Jubilee Medal	Canadian version	
	Queen Elizabeth II Diamond Jubilee Medal	Canadian version	
	King Charles III Coronation Medal	Canadian version	
	Doctor of Laws, honoris causa	Royal Roads University	

Coat of arms of Janet Austin
Crest Issuant from a wreath of dwarf poinciana flowers proper, a demi-lion Or charged on its shoulder with three gouttes de poix and holding in its dexter paw a Latin cross erablé Gules; Escutcheon Azure on a chevron engrailed between three Latin crosses Or, three roses Gules barbed Vert seeded Or; Motto MENS CONSCIA RECTI (A Mind Conscious Of Rectitude)
