= John Horgan =

Premier of British Columbia from 2017 to 2022

- Horgan in 2017

Ambassador of Canada to Germany
- In office December 8, 2023 – November 12, 2024
- Appointed by: Mary Simon
- Prime Minister: Justin Trudeau
- Preceded by: Stéphane Dion (2022)
- Succeeded by: Vera Alexander (2025)

36th Premier of British Columbia
- In office July 18, 2017 – November 18, 2022
- Monarchs: Elizabeth II; Charles III
- Lieutenant Governor: Judith Guichon; Janet Austin
- Deputy: Carole James; Mike Farnworth
- Preceded by: Christy Clark
- Succeeded by: David Eby
Other political and leadership positions
Leader of the Opposition of British Columbia
In office May 4, 2014 – July 18, 2017
Preceded by	Adrian Dix
Succeeded by	Christy Clark
Leader of the British Columbia New Democratic Party
In office May 4, 2014 – October 21, 2022
Preceded by	Adrian Dix
Succeeded by	David Eby
Chair of the Council of the Federation
In office September 16, 2021 – September 27, 2022
Preceded by	Brian Pallister
Succeeded by	Heather Stefanson

Member of the Legislative Assembly for Langford-Juan de Fuca (2017–2023); Juan de Fuca (2009–2017); Malahat-Juan de Fuca (2005–2009)
- In office May 17, 2005 – March 31, 2023
- Preceded by: Brian Kerr
- Succeeded by: Ravi Parmar

Personal details
- Born: John Joseph Horgan; August 7, 1959 Victoria, British Columbia, Canada
- Died: November 12, 2024 (aged 65) Victoria, British Columbia, Canada
- Citizenship: Canada; Ireland
- Party: New Democratic
- Spouse: Ellie Horgan (m. 1984)
- Children: 2
- Education: Trent University (BA, 1983); University of Sydney (MA, 1986)
- Occupation: Diplomat; politician; consultant

John Joseph Horgan (August 7, 1959 – November 12, 2024) was a Canadian politician and diplomat who served as the 36th premier of British Columbia from 2017 to 2022 and the ambassador of Canada to Germany from 2023 to 2024. He led the British Columbia New Democratic Party from 2014 to 2022, guiding the party to government after 16 years in opposition. A member of the Legislative Assembly of British Columbia (MLA) from 2005 to 2023, he represented the riding of Langford-Juan de Fuca.

Horgan was born and raised in Victoria, British Columbia. He attended Reynolds Secondary School in Saanich, before moving to Peterborough, Ontario, to attend Trent University, where he met his wife, Ellie, and graduated with a Bachelor of Arts in 1983. Horgan studied in Australia at the University of Sydney, earning a master's in history in 1986 before he returned to Canada to work in politics and public policy. Horgan was elected to the BC Legislative Assembly in 2005.

In June 2006, he was appointed the Opposition critic for energy and mines in NDP leader Carole James's shadow cabinet, having previously served as the Opposition critic for education. In January 2011, he announced his candidacy for leadership of the BC NDP in the 2011 leadership election, finishing third. Following the leadership election, he was appointed the Official Opposition critic for Energy, and Opposition house leader.

On March 17, 2014, he announced his candidacy in the 2014 leadership election, with the slogan "Real Leadership. For All BC". During the campaign, he talked at length about the necessity of balancing the need for jobs and resource development while protecting British Columbia's natural environment. Horgan was acclaimed to the position on May 1, 2014, and was officially inaugurated as party leader on May 5, 2014.

In the 2017 provincial election held on May 9, 2017, Premier Christy Clark's BC Liberal government was reduced to 43 seats, one seat short of a majority. On May 29, 2017, it was announced that the NDP and Green Party of British Columbia had reached a confidence and supply agreement in which the Greens would support an NDP minority government for four years. After the legislature was recalled, Clark sought its confidence in the Liberal government. Following a non-confidence motion on June 29, 2017, which was won (44–42) by the combined votes of the NDP and Green members, Lieutenant Governor Judith Guichon turned down Clark's request for a snap election and invited the NDP to form a minority government. Subsequently, Horgan succeeded Clark as the premier of British Columbia. Horgan was the province's first NDP premier since Ujjal Dosanjh in 2001.

On September 21, 2020, Horgan called a snap election that was held on October 24. On November 8, with the final vote count completed, the NDP won a record 57 seats with the highest share of the popular vote in the party's history and formed a majority government for the first time since the 1996 general election. The election result made Horgan British Columbia's first two-term NDP premier. During his second term, Horgan became the longest serving BC NDP premier in the province's history.

On June 28, 2022, Horgan announced that he would be stepping down as premier and NDP leader once a new leader had been chosen. Horgan was succeeded by David Eby on November 18, 2022. On November 1, 2023, Prime Minister Justin Trudeau announced that Horgan would be appointed Canada's ambassador to Germany. Horgan presented his credentials to the German president on December 8. He served in the position until his death from cancer in November 2024.

== Early life and career ==
Horgan was born on August 7, 1959, in Victoria, British Columbia, Canada, the son of Alice May (née Clutterbuck) and Pat Horgan. Horgan was 18 months old when his father died, and he and his three siblings were raised by their mother. He worked multiple jobs to save money for university, including at a pulp mill in Ocean Falls. Horgan met his wife Ellie Horgan in 1979 while studying at Trent University in Peterborough, Ontario. They have two sons together. In 1983, Horgan earned a Bachelor of Arts from Trent.

He waited tables at the Keg in Victoria before earning his master's degree in history from the University of Sydney in 1986. Returning to Canada he went to Ottawa and worked as a legislative assistant to James Manly and later to Lynn Hunter. Horgan returned to Victoria in 1991 and became ministerial assistant to Dave Zirnhelt. In 1993, he was named analyst in the Policy Coordination Branch of the Ministry of Government Services, and in 1996, director at the Cabinet Policy and Communications Secretariat, Ministry of Finance and Corporate Relations. His positions from 1991 through 1998 saw him assume increasing responsibilities within government, including lead negotiator on the Columbia Basin Trust and as a participant on teams for the Columbia River Treaty and Land Use Plans. In 1998, he worked as a director in the Crown Corporations Secretariat before going on to work at Columbia Power as director of Corporate Affairs, focusing on getting Keenleyside and Brilliant dams repowered. In 1999, he was appointed chief of staff in the office of Premier Dan Miller. His last job in government was at the level of associate deputy minister working in the Ministry of Finance on energy projects. Following the change of government in 2001, Horgan created a small business that focused on policy, management, research and government liaison work. He formed a consulting company called IdeaWorks, along with former deputy minister Nancy Thompson, former NDP caucus research director Mary O'Donoghue, and two former NDP bureaucrats—Ian Reid and John Heaney—with whom he worked in the Ministry of Management Services in the 1990s, overseeing the expansion of gambling across the province. IdeaWorks was credited with developing a sophisticated campaign in 2003 by which they were successful in convincing Vancouver City Council to lift a moratorium on slot machines. In 2008, Horgan was diagnosed with bladder cancer; he was eventually declared cancer free after surgery and treatment.

== Early years as MLA (2005–2014) ==
=== 38th Parliament ===
As the 2005 provincial election was approaching, the 45-year-old Horgan won the NDP nomination against Julie Thomas of Shawnigan Lake in the riding of Malahat-Juan de Fuca. The incumbent MLA Brian Kerr was not seeking re-election, so in the general election Horgan faced BC Liberal Cathy Basskin of Cowichan Bay, Democratic Reform BC party leader Tom Morino, Green Party candidate Steven Hurdle, and Western Canada Concept candidate Pattie O'Brien. Though Horgan won his riding, the NDP under Carole James's leadership formed the Official Opposition to the BC Liberals who formed a majority government.

Horgan was named to the NDP front bench as its education critic. He criticized the government's 2005 Teachers' Collective Agreement Act which legislated teachers into a new contract (which was later overturned after 11 years of litigation by the Supreme Court of Canada on the basis of violating the Canadian Constitution), after several months of unsuccessful collective bargaining, as "[inflaming] an already volatile situation". In June 2006, Horgan was named energy and mines critic. Horgan called for the BC Oil and Gas Commission to provide more transparent reporting after it was reported that its annual 97 percent compliance rating was near-perfect, despite 2,500 known infractions, the majority of which were rated major or serious. Following a sudden sharp increase in gasoline prices in early 2007, Horgan introduced the Retail Petroleum Consumer Protection Act as a private member bill which, if passed, would have put gasoline prices under the jurisdiction of the BC Utilities Commission, the same as electricity and natural gas. The bill was supported by an 18,000-signature petition and elicited editorial responses from Minister Neufeld and Christy Clark.

In January 2007, Horgan accused Premier Gordon Campbell of conflict-of-interest due to his owning of shares of Alcan while signing an order-in-council approving an agreement between Alcan and BC Hydro (part of the BC Liberals attempt to privatize electricity generation in BC) which was subsequently overturned by the Utilities Commission as being not in the public interest. The Ethics Commissioner cleared Campbell of wrongdoing but made a recommendation that cabinet ministers and other senior officials place their assets in blind trusts. Horgan subsequently introduced this recommendation as the private member bill Members' Conflict of Interest Amendment Act in the third and fourth sessions and a similar but more comprehensive bill, in line with the Federal Accountability Act, but they were not advanced beyond first reading.

In 2007, following a legislative amendment that immediately increased MLA salaries by 29%, Horgan, along with all other NDP MLAs, donated the increase to charities in his riding, such as hospices and food banks, for the remainder of the 38th Parliament.

=== 39th Parliament ===
Horgan was acclaimed as the NDP candidate for the 2009 election in the Juan de Fuca riding. He defeated Colwood mayor Jody Twa of the BC Liberals and Metchosin farmer James Powell of the Green Party. In the 39th Parliament, the NDP again formed the Official Opposition to the BC Liberals, who formed their third consecutive majority government. Party leader Carole James kept Horgan as Energy and Mines critic. Horgan was critical of the government overturning the BC Utilities Commission's decision on obtaining electricity from independent power producers and exempting the Site C dam and the northwest transmission line projects from Utilities Commission review, arguing that the projects were not in the public interest. Horgan linked the government's imposition of private IPP electricity purchasing agreements on BC Hydro and the exemption of BC Utilities Commission review of major public projects (including the smart meter implementation program) to increases in BC Hydro rates. Horgan responded to the government's energy plan with an editorial to which Minister Blair Lekstrom responded. Horgan presented to the legislature a declaration of opposition to the Site C project, as signed by Peace River area residents and First Nations.

During criticism of party leader Carole James, Horgan remained loyal by refusing to join in the criticism. Following her resignation, the 51-year-old Horgan put himself forward as a leadership candidate for the NDP. He campaigned on policy platforms including a comprehensive review of taxation under a Fair Tax Commission, expanding the carbon tax to include the exempted large industrial emitters, getting the Evergreen Line and light rail to the Western Communities built, implementing the recommendations of the Select Standing Committee on Aquaculture, continuing the ban on North Coast tanker traffic and offshore oil exploration, and introducing the Endangered Species Act. He was endorsed by Robin Austin, Gary Coons, Kathy Corrigan, Scott Fraser, Maurine Karagianis, Bill Routley, Shane Simpson, and Claire Trevena, as well as Harry Lali and Nicholas Simons after they dropped out of the race. Opinion polling placed Horgan third behind Adrian Dix and Mike Farnworth, but being seen as a suitable compromise candidate between the party's preferred stronger candidate of Dix and the more likable Farnworth. Dix went on to win and assigned Horgan back to the role of critic for the Ministry of Energy, Mines and Petroleum Resources which Doug Donaldson had overseen during the leadership election, as well as adding house leader to his duties.

== Leader of the Opposition (2014–2017) ==
=== 40th Parliament ===
In the 2013 election Horgan again won the Juan de Fuca riding, this time against BC Liberal candidate and Sooke councillor Kerrie Reay and Green Party candidate Carlos Serra. On the local level, his campaign focused on transportation issues and regional growth while on the provincial campaign he promised a comprehensive review of BC Hydro, in particular its debt load, commitments to independent power producers, and future infrastructure requirements, and advocated a market-driven approach to creating a liquefied natural gas industry, in contrast to the BC Liberal approach, at the time, of presenting expressions of interest as committed future revenue. The NDP were favoured to win the general election but, while Horgan won his riding, the party again formed the Official Opposition with Horgan returning to his role as critic for the energy portfolio in the 40th Parliament. Shortly after the election, Horgan and Minister of Energy and Mines Bill Bennett exchanged op-eds regarding new BC Hydro rate increases and cost overruns in the Northwest Transmission line project.

In September 2013, Dix announced his resignation as NDP leader and both Horgan and Farnsworth were immediately considered front-runners to replace him. A month later Horgan stated his intention not to run and encouraged the younger NDP MLAs, such as David Eby, Spencer Chandra Herbert and Rob Fleming, to enter the leadership race. However, by January 2014 only Mike Farnworth announced an intention to run. With Farnworth formally declaring his candidacy in early March 2014, Horgan was urged to reconsider. The 54-year old Horgan announced his candidacy on March 17 backed by Carole James, Maurine Karagianis and Bill Routley. David Eby and Michelle Mungall endorsed him and co-chaired his campaign and within a week 15 MLAs endorsed him. In early April, with Horgan receiving further endorsements from Dawn Black, Joe Trasolini and Fin Donnelly – all figures from Farnworth's Tri-Cities-area, Farnworth withdrew from the leadership race, leaving Horgan the sole candidate. After the deadline for nominations passed on May 1, Horgan was acclaimed leader of the BC NDP and became the leader of the Opposition. He appointed Farnsworth as opposition house leader, with Mungall as his deputy and critic of social development, and split his old position of critic position into three parts divided between Norm Macdonald as critic of energy and mines, Bruce Ralston on natural gas, Dix on BC Hydro, as well as charging the younger MLAs with significant portfolios, like Rob Fleming with education, Spencer Chandra Herbert with environment, and David Eby with eight specific critic responsibilities.

Just prior to becoming leader, the parliament's second session, Horgan introduced two private member bills, the Standing Committee Reform Act, 2014 (Bill M-203) that would have expanded the scope of their terms of reference and required they be appointed at the beginning of each parliament with membership in proportion to party standings, and the Parliamentary Calendar Act, 2014 (Bill M-204) that would have legislated that the parliament must convene in the Spring and Fall of each year. After he became leader, these two bills were re-introduced by NDP critic on democratic reform Gary Holman in the fourth session (2015). As leader, Horgan introduced three bills, all in the fifth session: the Hydro Affordability Act, 2016 (Bill M-206) that would allow the Utilities Commission to require a utility to offer a 'lifeline rate' to low-income households, the Speculator Tracking and Housing Affordability Fund Act, 2016 (Bill M-209) that would have allowed participating jurisdictions that levy a 2% property tax on residential properties held vacant for use in affordable housing initiatives, and Campaign Finance Reform Act, 2016 (Bill M-213) that would ban corporations and unions from making financial political contributions and require the chief electoral officer review and provide recommendations regarding the financing of the political process. In the sixth session, Horgan introduced the Get Big Money Out of Politics Act, 2017 which would ban union and corporate donations to political campaigns, prohibit political contributions from foreigners, and prohibit the premier and ministers from receiving second salaries.

== Premier of British Columbia (2017–2022) ==
=== 41st Parliament ===
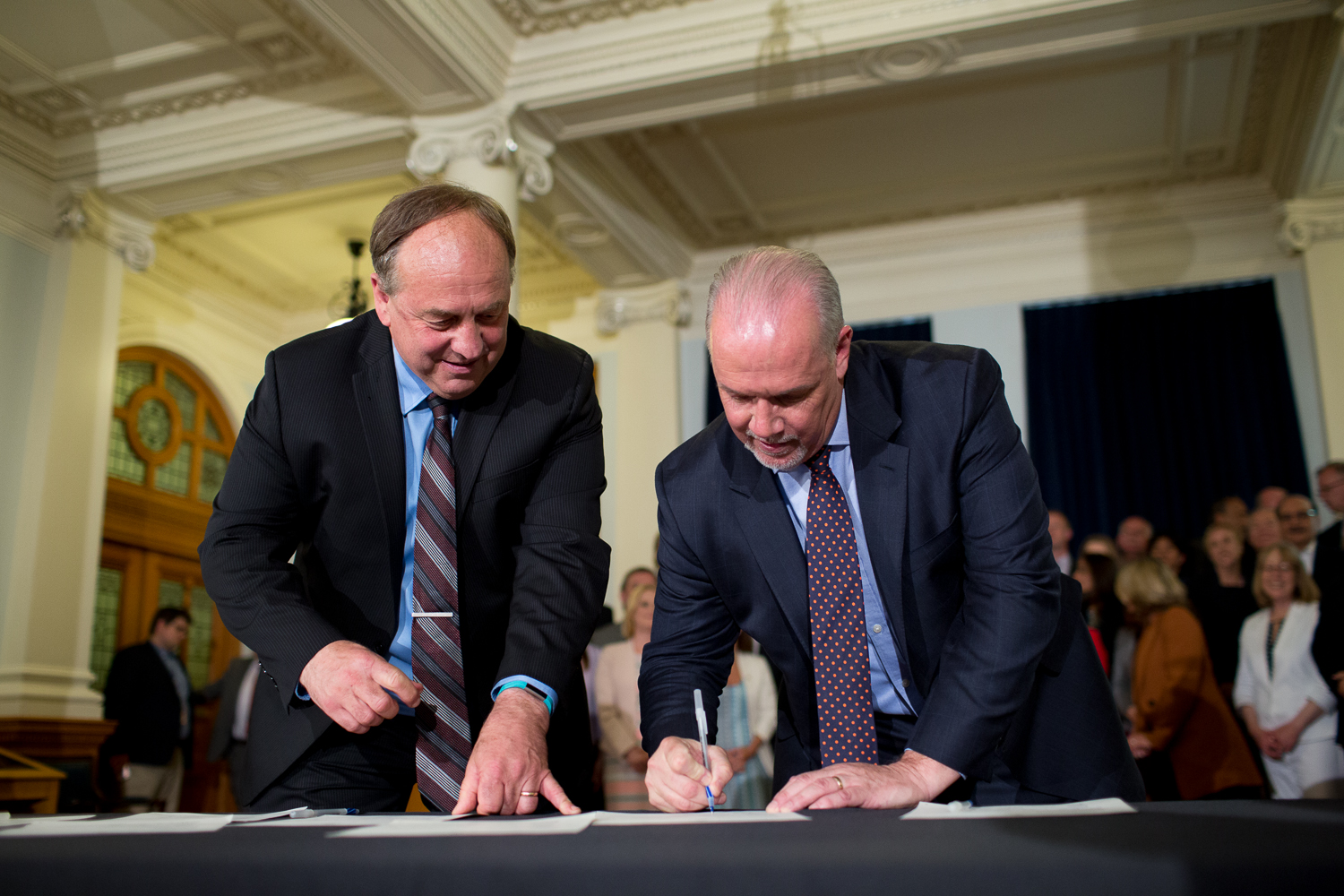
Green Party leader Andrew Weaver and Horgan sign the confidence and supply agreement.

In the 2017 general election, Horgan sought re-election in the Langford-Juan de Fuca riding. His opponents included BC Liberal candidate Cathy Noel, BC Green candidate Brendan Ralfs, as well as Scott Burton of the BC Libertarian Party and Willie Nelson of the newly formed Vancouver Island Party. In his capacity as party leader, Horgan spent much of the campaign travelling the province endorsing local candidates. He engaged in debates with the BC Liberal and BC Green leaders, namely Christy Clark and Andrew Weaver. Despite initially leading in the polls, his party ultimately secured only 41 seats, relegating them to the role of Official Opposition, while the BC Liberals and BC Green Party won 43 and 3 seats respectively. Horgan and Weaver, however, struck a confidence-and-supply agreement (which both parties' caucuses endorsed), giving the NDP–Green coalition one more seat than the Liberals.

Clark did not resign, arguing she had a constitutional duty to test Parliament's confidence as the incumbent premier. Clark initiated the first session of the 41st Parliament of British Columbia on June 22. On June 28, Horgan introduced a no-confidence motion as an amendment to the Speech from the Throne. With both the NDP and the BC Greens, who held 41 seats and 3 seats respectively, voting for the amendment, it was passed on a 44 to 42 vote. The passage of the no-confidence motion marked the first time that a BC government has been defeated in the legislature. Clark then asked Lieutenant Governor Judith Guichon to dissolve parliament and call a new election, despite having previously stated that she would not make such a request and would resign as premier if her party lost a no-confidence vote. She argued that the NDP could not provide stable government because it needed to appoint one of its members as Speaker, and that person would have to frequently use their vote to break 43 to 43 ties. Guichon rejected this argument and instead invited Horgan to form government. The Horgan ministry was duly sworn in on July 18, 2017.

With Clark resigning her seat in August and Liberal MLA Darryl Plecas agreeing to take the Speaker's post in September (for which he was subsequently expelled from his party), along with the BC Green votes in confidence motions, Horgan was able to continue in office by one seat without requiring the Speaker to cast a tie-breaking vote. The 41st Parliament would convene for five sessions of variable lengths between June 22, 2017, and September 21, 2020, before Horgan called a snap election.

On December 7, 2017, Horgan announced that, following a review and despite his earlier opposition, the NDP government had decided to continue with construction of the Site C hydroelectric power plant. Horgan cited the review conducted by the BC Utilities Commission, which found that the cost to taxpayers of continuing with the project would be less than that of cancelling the project. Horgan emphasized that the NDP would not have chosen to start the project.

In 2019, BC became the first Canadian province to start bringing its legislation in alliance with the United Nations' Declaration on the Rights of Indigenous Peoples (UNDRIP) by implementing the Declaration on the Rights of Indigenous Peoples Act. After passing the legislation, the government began working with the Assembly of First Nations, First Nations Summit and Union of British Columbia Indian Chiefs, headed by First Nations Chiefs of BC, to employ UNDRIP principles. The legislation was originally put forth by Minister of Indigenous Relations and Reconciliation Scott Fraser. The Legislative Assembly of British Columbia noted that the purposes the act were as follows: (a) to affirm the application of the Declaration to the laws of British Columbia; (b) to contribute to the implementation of the Declaration; (c) to support the affirmation of, and develop relationships with, Indigenous governing bodies. As of November 2019, the BC government had committed to putting almost CA$100 million per year aside for First Nations communities, for them to invest in their own self-governance and cultural revitalization; the province has also dedicated $50 million to invest in First Nations language revitalization. Additionally, the government implemented Grand Chief Edward John's recommendations to decrease the number of Indigenous children taken from homes and put in care.

By January 1, 2020, Horgan fulfilled a campaign promise to eliminate monthly medical service plan fees for individuals. The fee revenue was replaced with a payroll tax, paid solely by employers, not exceeding 1.95 percent of an employer's total remuneration (with an exemption for employers whose total remuneration did not exceed $500,000, hence exempting many small businesses from the tax).

=== 42nd Parliament ===
Elections in British Columbia must be held at least every four years, but the lieutenant governor has the right to dissolve Parliament early (in practice only ever on the advice of the premier). On September 21, 2020, Horgan asked Lieutenant Governor Janet Austin for an early election, ending the NDP-Green confidence and supply agreement that had allowed the NDP-Green coalition to form government following the 2017 election. In accordance with provincial constitutional practice, Austin granted the request, setting an election for October 24. It was the first snap election in the province since 1986.

Horgan led the BC NDP to a decisive victory with 57 seats—the most the party had ever won in a provincial election, and the first time since 1996 that the NDP had won government in its own right. Several campaign issues were focused on, including whether or not to end the monopoly on car insurance held by the province's public insurer ICBC or to switch to a no-fault model.

On March 3, 2021, Horgan introduced Bill 9, the Local Elections Statutes Amendment Act 2021, a piece of legislation that regulated municipal elections in the province with regard to campaign financing and spending. It required all elector organizations (local municipal parties) to register and publish financial statements (including campaign financing and spending) with Elections BC. The bill was intended to improve transparency in municipal elections. The bill became law, coming into force for municipal elections on or after October 1, 2022.

On September 16, 2021, Horgan was selected to chair the Council of the Federation, a body composed of Canada's provincial and territorial premiers.

On October 28, 2021, it was announced that Horgan had discovered a growth in his throat that required surgery. As a result, he appointed Mike Farnworth as deputy premier. Horgan underwent "successful" surgery on October 29, 2021. Six days later, Horgan announced that the growth was malignant. He said that he would require radiation treatment, and that he anticipated "a full recovery". He also said he planned to continue on as premier, and that he would take part in meetings virtually, but that Farnworth or other ministers might attend in-person at events on his behalf.

From January 1, 2022, onwards, legislation introduced in 2021 required a minimum of five paid sick days per year for all employees covered by the BC Employment Standards Act (ESA). This made BC the first province in Canada to implement legislation requiring employers to provide employees with paid sick leave and was part of the province's response to the COVID-19 pandemic.

On June 28, 2022, Horgan announced that he would be stepping down as premier and NDP party leader once a new leader had been chosen to replace him for health reasons. He had been diagnosed with throat cancer in 2021. On February 9, 2023, Horgan announced that he would resign as an MLA that March and retire from politics. The by-election to replace him was held on June 24, 2023, which saw the NDP candidate Ravi Parmar win with 53.35% of the vote.

On October 18, 2022, Horgan introduced Bill 22 to reform the freedom of information (FOI) law. It excluded access to metadata, allowed agencies to disregard an FOI request if it were excessively broad, and allowed them to charge an application fee. BC's information commissioner noted that in the six months following its passing, the number of media FOI requests had dropped by 80%. The NDP government under Horgan's successor, David Eby, has not repealed the fees.

== Post-political career ==
Horgan's resignation as an MLA took effect on March 31, 2023. Shortly afterwards, The Globe and Mail reported that he would join the board of Elk Valley Resources, a new subsidiary of Teck Resources that produces metallurgical coal, pending shareholder approval. However, Teck ultimately decided against splitting its coal and metal businesses and the appointment did not happen.

He was appointed by Justin Trudeau to be the next ambassador to Germany on November 1, 2023. He went on leave from the position in June 2024 after being diagnosed with cancer for a third time.

== Personal life and death ==
Horgan was married to Ellie, and they had two sons. He died from thyroid cancer at the Royal Jubilee Hospital in Victoria, on November 12, 2024, at the age of 65.

== Electoral results ==
2020 British Columbia general election: Langford-Juan de Fuca
Party	Candidate	Votes	%	±%	Expenditures
New Democratic	John Horgan	18,073	67.89	+15.14	$29,254.09
Green	Gord Baird	4,437	16.67	−2.46	$15,772.59
Liberal	Kelly Darwin	3,980	14.95	−11.15	$3,601.34
Communist	Tyson Riel Strandlund	130	0.49	–	$123.40
Total valid votes		26,620	99.54	–	
Total rejected ballots		122	0.46	+0.03	
Turnout		26,742	55.35	–6.76	
Registered voters		48,316			
New Democratic hold		Swing		+8.80	
Source: Elections BC

2017 British Columbia general election: Langford-Juan de Fuca
Party	Candidate	Votes	%	±%	Expenditures
New Democratic	John Horgan	13,224	52.75	-0.56	$57,955
Liberal	Cathy Noel	6,544	26.11	-4.66	$59,254
Green	Brendan Ralfs	4,795	19.13	+3.22	$5,406
Libertarian	Scott Burton	262	1.05		$202
Vancouver Island Party	Willie Nelson	242	0.97		$0
Total valid votes		25,067	99.57		
Total rejected ballots		108	0.43	+0.04	
Turnout		25,175	62.11	+4.04	
Registered voters		40,532			
New Democratic hold		Swing		+2.05	
Source: Elections BC

2013 British Columbia general election: Juan de Fuca
Party	Candidate	Votes	%	±%	Expenditures
New Democratic	John Horgan	12,338	53.32	−3.89	$97,977
Liberal	Kerrie Reay	7,120	30.77	−3.33	$19,846
Green	Carlos Serra	3,682	15.91	+7.23	$812
Total valid votes		23,140	99.61		
Total rejected ballots		91	0.39	-0.14	
Turnout		23,231	58.07	-1.79	
Registered voters		40,002			
New Democratic hold		Swing		-0.28	
Source: Elections BC

2011 British Columbia New Democratic Party leadership election
Candidate	First ballot		Second ballot		Third ballot	
Candidate	Votes	Percent	Votes	Percent	Votes	Percent
Adrian Dix	7,638	38.2%	7,748	39.3%	9,772	51.8%
Mike Farnworth	6,979	34.9%	6,951	35.2%	9,095	48.2%
John Horgan	4,844	24.2%	5,034	25.5%		
Dana Larsen	531	2.7%				

2009 British Columbia general election: Juan de Fuca
Party	Candidate	Votes	%	Expenditures
New Democratic	John Horgan	11,520	57.21	$73,822
Liberal	Jody Twa	6,866	34.10	$149,286
Green	James Powell	1,749	8.69	$1,635
Total valid votes		20,135	99.47	
Total rejected ballots		107	0.53	
Turnout		20,242	59.87	
Registered voters		33,812		

2005 British Columbia general election: Malahat-Juan de Fuca
Party	Candidate	Votes	%	Expenditures
New Democratic	John Horgan	12,460	46.09	$42,953
Liberal	Cathy Basskin	10,528	38.94	$24,538
Green	Steven Hurdle	2,610	9.65	$1,488
Democratic Reform	Tom Morino	1,256	4.65	$2,775
Western Canada Concept	Pattie O'Brien	180	0.67	$100
Total valid votes		27,034	100	
Total rejected ballots		128	0.47	
Turnout		27,162	69.57	

Diplomatic posts
Preceded by Isabelle Poupart (acting)	Ambassador to Germany; 2023–2024	Succeeded by TBD
