= David Eby =

Premier of British Columbia from 2022 to 2026

David Eby KC MLA
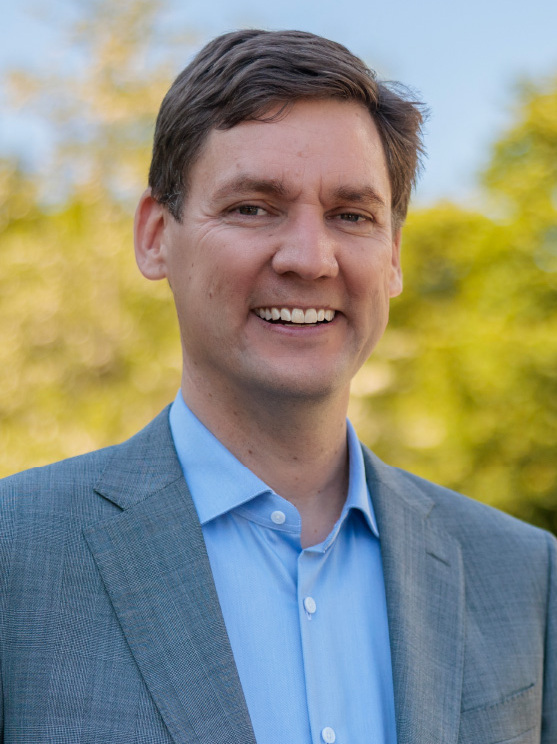
- Campaign portrait, 2024

37th Premier of British Columbia
- In office November 18, 2022 – November 20, 2026
- Monarch: Charles III
- Lieutenant Governor: Janet Austin; Wendy Lisogar-Cocchia
- Deputy: Mike Farnworth; Niki Sharma
- Preceded by: John Horgan
- Succeeded by: Lorne Doerkson

Leader of the British Columbia New Democratic Party
- In office October 21, 2022 – October 29, 2026
- Preceded by: John Horgan
- Succeeded by: Jennifer Whiteside (interim)

Attorney General of British Columbia
- In office July 18, 2017 – July 19, 2022
- Premier: John Horgan
- Preceded by: Andrew Wilkinson
- Succeeded by: Murray Rankin (acting)

Minister Responsible for Housing of British Columbia
- In office November 26, 2020 – July 19, 2022
- Premier: John Horgan
- Preceded by: Selina Robinson (Minister of Municipal Affairs and Housing)
- Succeeded by: Murray Rankin

Member of the British Columbia Legislative Assembly for Vancouver-Point Grey
- Incumbent
- Assumed office May 14, 2013
- Preceded by: Christy Clark

Personal details
- Born: David Robert Patrick Eby; July 21, 1976 (age 50) Kitchener, Ontario, Canada
- Party: New Democratic
- Spouse: Cailey Lynch
- Children: 3
- Education: University of Waterloo (BA); Dalhousie University (LLB)
- Profession: Lawyer

David Robert Patrick Eby (/ˈiːbi/; born July 21, 1976) is a Canadian politician and lawyer who served as the 37th premier of British Columbia and leader of the New Democratic Party from 2022 to 2026. He has represented the electoral district of Vancouver-Point Grey in the Legislative Assembly since 2013.

Eby began his legal career with a focus on civil rights and social justice issues, working at the Pivot Legal Society from 2005 to 2008. He then became the executive director of the British Columbia Civil Liberties Association (BCCLA), serving from 2008 to 2012. During this period, Eby gained recognition for his advocacy on civil liberties and legal reforms, establishing himself as a prominent figure in British Columbia's legal community. He also served as president of the Canadian HIV/AIDS Legal Network.

In 2013, Eby was elected to the provincial legislature, representing Vancouver-Point Grey, unseating Christy Clark, the incumbent Premier of British Columbia at the time. During his tenure, Eby focused on the issues of housing affordability, public safety, and legal reforms. In 2017, he was appointed attorney general in Premier John Horgan's cabinet, where he contributed to policies aimed at addressing housing affordability, money laundering, and electoral reform.

In 2022, Eby became leader of the NDP following the resignation of Premier Horgan, who stepped down due to health concerns. Eby was elected party leader by acclamation and was sworn in as premier on November 18, 2022. In the 2024 provincial election, he led the NDP as they held on to a narrow majority, securing 47 seats and forming a third consecutive NDP government.

Eby called a snap election on October 24, 2026, nearly two years ahead of schedule. The election resulted in a victory for the Conservative Party, reducing the NDP to the Official Opposition with only 27 seats. It marked the first time since the 1975 provincial election that a governing party in British Columbia had called an early election and lost. Eby subsequently announced his resignation as party leader on election night.

== Early life and career ==
David Robert Patrick Eby was born in 1976 in Kitchener, Ontario. His father, Brian, was a personal injury lawyer and his mother, Laura, was a teacher, and later an elementary school principal. The eldest of four children, he has a sister, Meaghan, and two brothers named Matthew and Patrick. As a teenager, he took his brother to protest against the treatment of circus elephants. He was president of the student council at St. Mary's High School in his final year.

He studied English at the University of Waterloo and worked for a communications firm after graduation. In 2004, he graduated from the Schulich School of Law in Halifax, Nova Scotia. He articled for the Department of Justice Canada and was called to the bar in June 2005.

He worked at Pivot Legal Society from 2005 to 2008 in Vancouver's Downtown Eastside before becoming the executive director of the British Columbia Civil Liberties Association (BCCLA) from 2008 until 2012. He is the author of The Arrest Handbook: A Guide to Your Rights, published by the BCCLA.

He served as president of the Canadian HIV/AIDS Legal Network and as a research associate with the Canadian Centre for Policy Alternatives.

== Early political career (2008–2017) ==
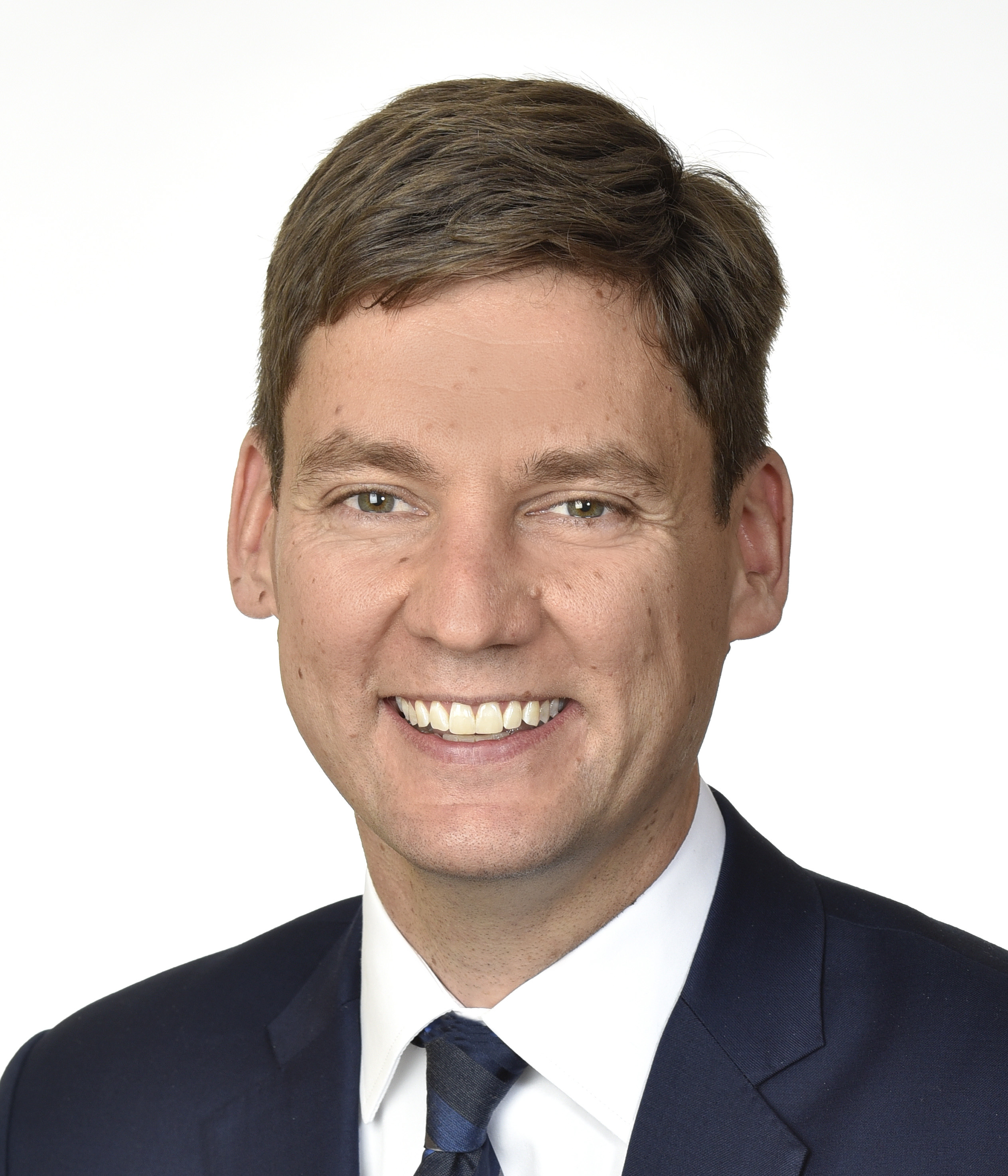
BC NDP MLA portrait, 2016

In 2008, Eby sought a Vancouver city council nomination from Vision Vancouver, but was unsuccessful.

In 2011, Eby stood as the NDP candidate in the by-election for Vancouver-Point Grey. The riding had been vacated by former premier Gordon Campbell and was being contested by newly sworn in premier Christy Clark, of the BC Liberal Party, who did not hold a seat in the legislature. Eby placed a close second, only 595 votes behind Clark. Two years later, ahead of the 2013 general election, he again sought the NDP nomination in Vancouver-Point Grey for a rematch against Clark. On election day, Eby defeated Clark in a rare instance of a premier being unseated despite their party winning re-election.

After his election as MLA, Eby was named to the NDP shadow cabinet as critic for advanced education. Eby strongly considered standing in the 2014 British Columbia New Democratic Party leadership election, but declined after learning his then-fiancée was pregnant. He then served as campaign co-chair of John Horgan's successful leadership bid. Later that year, Eby was named the critic for tourism, housing, gaming and liquor policy. As housing critic, he called for an inquiry into Vancouver's real estate market over a practice called "shadow flipping", suggesting it was being done as part of tax avoidance and money laundering. He also uncovered several instances of high-value property being purchased by buyers listed as students and homemakers, and called for an investigation into whether banks were enabling speculation by not verifying income.

In 2016, former NDP premier Glen Clark described Eby as "the future of the NDP".

== Attorney General of British Columbia (2017–2022) ==
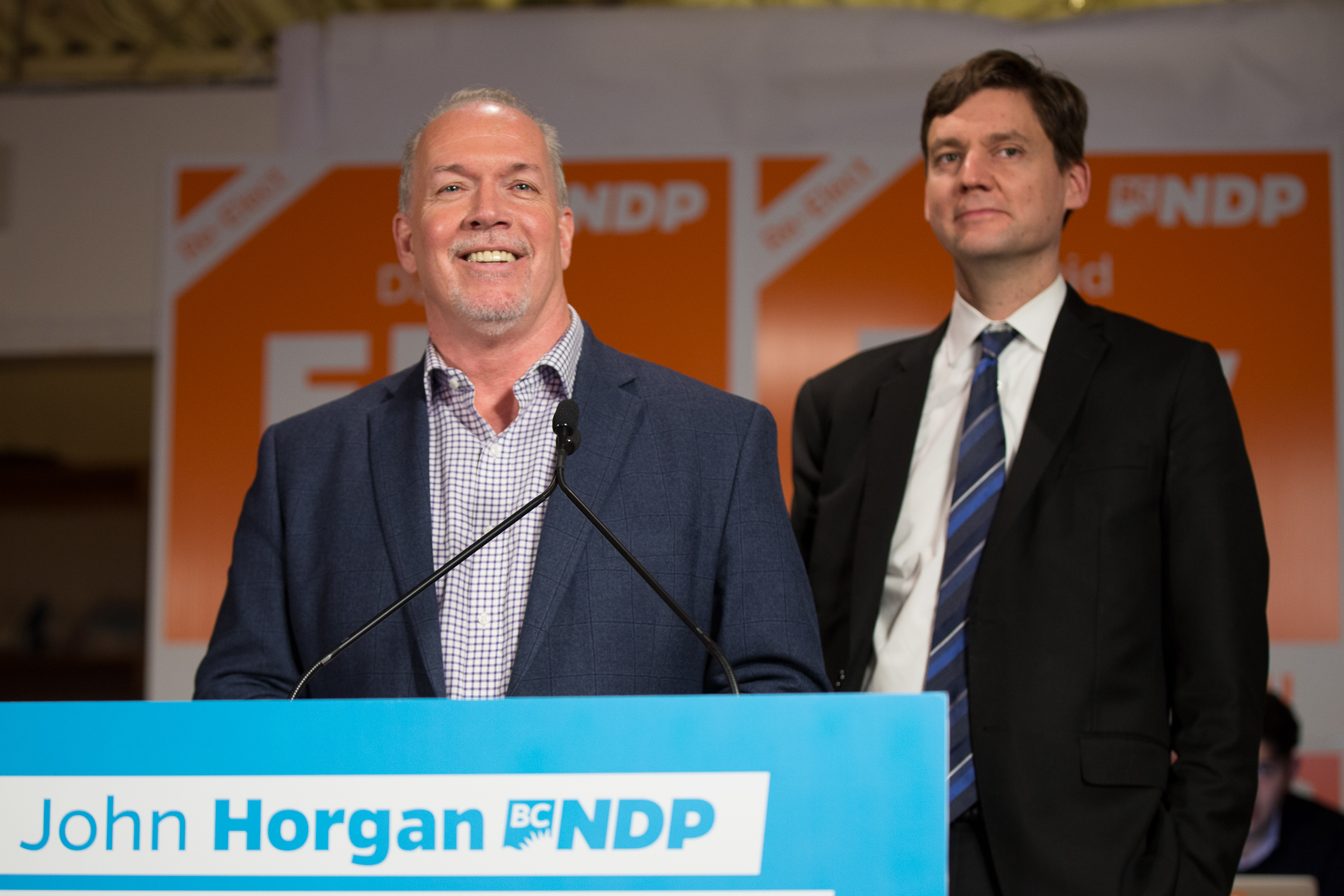
John Horgan and Eby in 2017

Following the 2017 British Columbia election, which saw the NDP form government with the support of the Green Party, Eby was appointed to the cabinet of John Horgan as attorney general. He additionally became minister responsible for liquor, gambling and the Insurance Corporation of British Columbia (ICBC).

During Eby's tenure, British Columbia passed anti-SLAPP legislation. BC briefly had similar legislation in 2001, enacted by the then-incumbent NDP government that year before being repealed by the subsequent Liberal government. The new law was stronger than the previous version, removing the requirement to prove the person suing had bad intentions and needing only to show that being sued negatively impacted their ability to express an opinion on a matter of public interest. Josh Paterson, the executive director of the BC Civil Liberties Association, said the law should be "the model that other provinces should seek to copy."

In 2018, Maclean's described Eby's workload as "handl[ing] every live grenade in BC politics."

On July 19, 2022, Eby stepped down from cabinet in order to stand in the 2022 British Columbia New Democratic Party leadership election.

=== ICBC reform ===
On July 24, 2017, Eby released a report by accounting firm Ernst & Young that concluded that ICBC was in a poor financial situation. The report found the problem to lie in "the rising number and size of claims, larger cash settlements for minor injuries, and more claims costs going towards legal representation than to claimants", and that without significant reform, premiums for drivers would have to rise by almost 30% in two years to avoid significant losses. Over the next few months, Eby enacted measures to help tackle the issue, including a 6.4% rate increase, red light cameras at high-collision intersections, and a pilot program to eliminate distracted driving.

In January 2018, ICBC projected a net loss of $1.3 billion by the end of the current fiscal year. The following day, Eby described ICBC as a "financial dumpster fire" due to the "reckless decisions" and negligence of the previous Liberal government. Eby promised "major reforms to make ICBC financially viable again" would be announced shortly, but ruled out a switch to a no-fault insurance system.

In February 2018, the government announced several major changes to accident coverage. Payments for soft-injury claims were capped, medical benefits and wage loss payments were doubled, common treatments became pre-approved, and payouts changed from a lump-sum to a "care-based model" to cover costs on an as-needed basis. ICBC also changed its dispute resolution mechanism to a new civil resolution system to reduce legal costs. The changes were estimated to save $1 billion a year, though Eby did not rule out a future rate increase.

In September 2018, a new method of calculating insurance premiums came into effect that was more heavily weighted towards driving experience and crash history, and overall determined more by driver than vehicle. The change was expected to be revenue neutral, with two-thirds of drivers seeing their rates reduced but the remaining third of riskier drivers paying substantially more.

In February 2019, ICBC reported a net loss of $860 million in the first nine months of the fiscal year. The corporation blamed the loss on the escalating cost of insurance claims, and Eby said that reports from expert witnesses – some files including as much as six medical experts – were driving the costs. Later in February, Eby announced a cap on expert witnesses, to a maximum of three. On October 24, 2019, the Supreme Court of British Columbia struck down the cap, finding it "infringe[d] on the court's core jurisdiction to control its process". The province did not appeal and instead pursued new legislation to limit the number of expert reports while allowing for judicial discretion on whether additional experts are needed.

In February 2020, Eby announced that ICBC would be moving to a no-fault system. The change limited the types of collision where an ICBC customer can go to court for damage, with disputes instead being handled through the Civil Resolution Tribunal. The change to a no-fault system was justified as dramatically reducing the legal costs of ICBC, quickening payment of benefits, and lowering premiums. The announcement was criticized by the Trial Lawyers Association of BC. The introduction of no-fault insurance came despite Eby having previously ruled it out; Eby justified his change of mind by saying he previously "had too much confidence that the legal system could change more quickly than it actually can." After having been told by ICBC officials that a cap on injury costs would save $1 billion annually but still wasn't enough to prevent a 36% rate increase over the next five years, Eby was convinced the existing set-up was unsustainable. Premier Horgan gave his approval in December 2019.

The government's 2020 budget projected an $86 million surplus for ICBC in the 2020/21 fiscal year, growing to $191 million by 2022/2023. It was the first posted surplus for the corporation since 2015/16. In March 2020, Eby announced plans to introduce legislation to ensure ICBC's profits would remain in the corporation, used to reduce premiums or increase benefits, and prevent governments using it to cover other expenses – a practice Eby had previously criticized the Liberal government for, and that he said had contributed to ICBC's poor financial state.

Later in March 2020, the government announced that the maximum payout for serious disabling injuries would rise from $300,000 to $7.5 million. The move was to be financed by further moving disputes from court to the civil resolution tribunal, expected to save $1.5 billion in legal fees. The legislation was challenged by the Trial Lawyers Association of BC, and on March 3, 2021, the BC Supreme Court struck down the rules. It found that the government's decision to move the determination of accident claims out of the court system to its own tribunals was unconstitutional, and rejected the government's argument that injury cases were clogging the court system. The government appealed the decision, and on May 17, 2022, the BC Court of Appeal reversed the lower court's decision and sided with the government.

=== Investigation into money laundering ===
Upon being appointed minister, Eby was surprised to discover that the scale of money laundering in the province was much larger than he had believed. He found it "incomprehensible that the previous government had not done more to reduce the risk of money laundering and criminal activity in BC gambling facilities". On September 28, 2017, the government officially launched an investigation into the breadth of money laundering being done in the province's casinos. Eby hired Peter German, a former deputy commissioner of the RCMP and Correctional Service Canada and the author of Canada's leading anti-money-laundering law textbook, to lead the investigation. German's 2018 report found that over $100 million of dirty money had been cleaned in BC due to "a collective system failure".

On May 8, 2019, a report by an expert panel on dirty money found that $7.4 billion was laundered in BC in the previous year, with $5.3 billion going through real estate transactions. A week later, on May 15, the government announced a public inquiry into money laundering, to be headed by BC Supreme Court justice Austin Cullen. The inquiry would look into real estate, gaming, financial institutions and the corporate and professional sectors. On June 14, 2022, Cullen's final report was released. It concluded that the federal anti-money laundering regime was not effective, and that the province needed to develop its own system and tools in order to combat the problem. Cullen said that while it is impossible to come up with an exact figure, he estimated that the amount of money laundered in the province was in the billions. He also found no evidence of corruption among previous gaming ministers, and that they had tried to address the issue but admitted that they could have done more.

=== Electoral reform ===
As part of the deal with the Greens, the NDP government committed to holding a referendum on electoral reform. On October 4, 2017, Eby announced that the referendum would be conducted by mail ballot by the end of November 2018 and would require a simple province-wide majority to be approved. Between November 2017 and February 2018, Eby conducted public consultation on what questions should be on the ballot. On May 30, Eby announced that the ballot would be two questions: the first asking whether to change from the current first-past-the-post (FPTP) system to a proportional representation (PR) system, and the second asking voters to pick between three different models: dual-member proportional, mixed-member proportional and rural-urban proportional. On December 20, 2018, Elections BC announced that 61.3 percent of ballots voted to keep FPTP.

In a post-referendum interview, Eby explained that the two-question ballot was the result of the public consultations, and reflected a lack of consensus on an alternative system. He admitted surprise at how decisive the result was, but did not think any form of PR would have won in a single-ballot referendum, and concluded, "It does not seem to me British Columbians were in favour of changing the system. They seem happy with the system we have."

=== Housing ===
After the 2020 election, Eby was given the additional role of minister responsible for housing.

In an interview with the Times Colonist in February 2021, Eby outlined his goal to move everyone living in Victoria's parks into shelter by the end of March, and everyone living in Vancouver's Strathcona Park into shelter by the end of April. While this would require "an array of responses" that included temporary pod-like housing, Eby clarified that permanent housing was the end goal. The government later signed deals with the cities of Victoria and Vancouver to this effect.

As minister, Eby vigorously pushed for more homeless shelters, lobbying municipal governments and politicians to approve zoning plans and permit extensions ahead of their votes. Eby's actions drew criticism from some municipal politicians, such as the mayors of Cranbrook and Penticton, but he defended his approach: "I would be incredibly negligent in not [speaking] to municipal leaders that are voting on vitally important projects to prevent entrenched encampments in their communities."

Eby faced notable conflict with the City of Penticton. On March 2, 2021, the Penticton city council voted unanimously to deny a temporary-use permit to BC Housing that the agency needed to continue to run an emergency winter homeless shelter past March 31. Eby called the news "profoundly troubling", and noted that the council had assured him that they would grant the permit. Eby further said it was important to keep the shelter open until the agency built an additional supportive housing unit. Two weeks later, on March 18, Eby announced that the government would be using its power of paramountcy to overrule the council. That July, Penticton officially filed with the BC Supreme Court to challenge the provincial government's use of paramountcy powers.

In 2021, the BC government hired accounting firm Ernst & Young to conduct an independent probe of the BC Housing agency; their report, completed in May 2022, found the agency had inadequate oversight, and that unclear roles and responsibilities potentially impacted its ability to manage risks. Following the public release of the report, Eby dismissed the agency's board of commissioners. In July, he ordered a forensic audit of BC Housing.

== Premier of British Columbia (2022–2026) ==
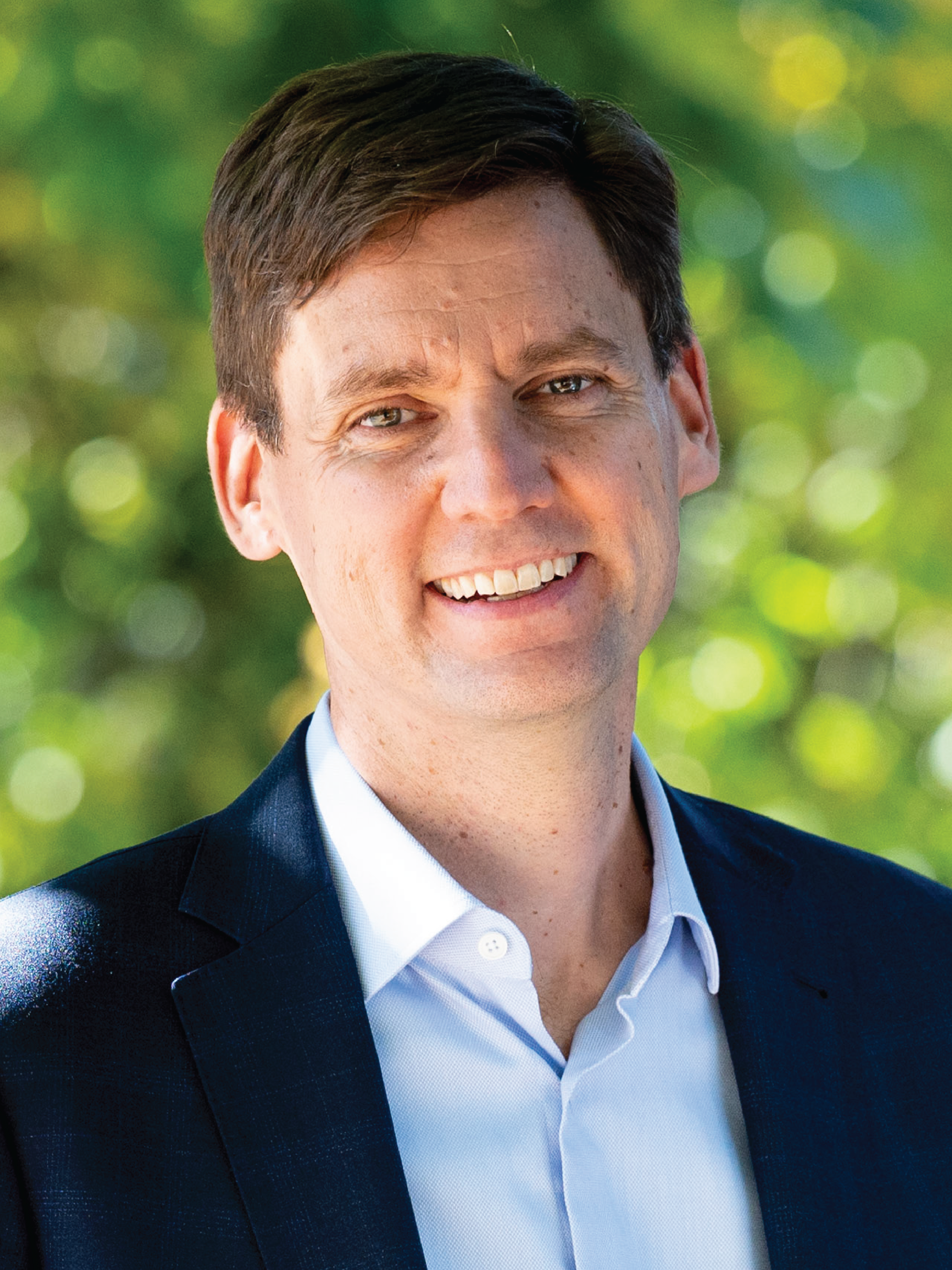
Eby in 2022, one day before his swearing in as premier.

=== NDP leadership campaign ===
In his 2022 leadership campaign, Eby advocated multiple solutions to the province's housing crisis. To combat flipping, Eby proposed a tax on the sale of residences that are sold within two years of being purchased.

Eby was endorsed by 48 of his caucus colleagues. On October 20, 2022, Eby won the leadership race by default after the disqualification of Anjali Appadurai, his only challenger. One source from within the party alleged the disqualification was "a pattern that reflected what...is the party’s “pervasive culture of cheating” to boost preferred candidates. He was declared the leader of the BC New Democratic Party and premier-designate of British Columbia on October 21, 2022.

=== Tenure ===
Eby was sworn in on November 18, 2022, in a ceremony led by the Musqueam First Nation.

As premier, Eby outlined housing, public safety and health care as his priorities. Immediately after being sworn in, he announced two tax credits – a one-time credit for electricity bills and a new BC Affordability Credit for low-to-medium income families – to help deal with affordability concerns. Eby also announced in December 2022 that he would direct ICBC to freeze basic auto insurance rates for two years.

In March 2023, an attempt to recall Eby as MLA over the termination of unvaccinated health care workers failed, with the recall petition falling short of the required number of signatures for a recall election.

Eby led the party into the 2024 provincial election, where the NDP won a third term in government and a second consecutive majority government, but with a net loss of eight seats. Shortly after the election, a confidence and supply agreement with the BC Greens was announced to ensure stability despite the narrow majority. In February 2026, the BC Greens decided not to renew the agreement.

In November 2025, Alberta Premier Danielle Smith reached a deal with Prime Minister Mark Carney to build an oil pipeline from Alberta to the British Columbia Coast. This proposal is opposed by Eby and most local First Nations, with Eby criticizing Carney for a lack of consultation.

Following the 2026 Tumbler Ridge shooting, a throne speech by the Eby government was cancelled and replaced with tributes to the victims.

In 2019, Horgan's NDP government passed the Declaration on the Rights of Indigenous Peoples Act (DRIPA), making the province the first jurisdiction in Canada to formally adopt the United Nations' Declaration on the Rights of Indigenous Peoples (UNDRIP). In 2025, DRIPA was cited in two landmark court cases: Cowichan Tribes v. Canada, which granted Aboriginal title over an privately-held land in south Richmond; and Gitxaała v. British Columbia, which found that the province's claims for mineral rights was inconsistent with DRIPA. The rulings created uncertainty regarding the validity of property rights. Eby criticized the ruling, saying it puts the courts, rather than the government, in the "driver's seat" of reconciliation and vowed to amend DRIPA. In 2026, Eby proposed suspending parts of the act for up to three years, in order to give time for the Supreme Court of Canada to hear the Gitxaała case, which was criticized by Indigenous leaders. Amid pressure from First Nations leaders and criticism within caucus, in April 2026, Eby abandoned his proposal and pledged to develop a new approach with Indigenous leaders.

On September 22, 2026, after much speculation, Eby called for a snap election to be held on October 24, 2026, citing concerns about the ongoing trade war between Canada and the United States. On election night, the NDP was defeated by the opposition Conservative Party, and Eby announced his resignation as NDP leader.

==== Cost of living ====
Two years away from a statutory election, Eby inherited a government facing critical issues, including housing affordability, inflation, health care concerns, public safety, and natural resource debates. His government's first budget included $6.4 billion over three years for health care, a $400 income-tested tax credit for renters, and increased income assistance, disability assistance, and family benefit payments.

Upon the swearing-in of his cabinet, Eby established a standalone housing ministry, appointing Ravi Kahlon as housing minister. In April 2023, Eby and Kahlon announced a new provincial housing plan, including province-wide zoning changes to permit multi-family homes, thousands of new student housing and social housing units, 10,000 transit-oriented homes, and a tax on house flipping.

In August 2023, Eby wrote to the Bank of Canada requesting a freeze on interest rate increases, which were contributing to high mortgage payments in British Columbia.

In September 2023, Eby's government announced that the province's maximum permitted rent increase for 2024 would be 3.5%, above the previous 2% but below Canada's inflation rate.

==== Economy ====
In May 2023, as the province's long-critical forestry sector faced curtailments and closures of sawmills, Eby announced a new focus on value-added lumber products, citing the inability to continue relying on high-volume raw log exports “as the province has in the past. Under the StrongerBC post-secondary education initiative, 1,800 forestry workers will be provided job training to help shift toward value-added products like mass timber.

In June 2023, Eby led a trade mission to Japan, South Korea, and Singapore with the aim of reducing the risk of British Columbia's reliance on China as its second-largest national trading partner.

In 2025, he signed agreements with other provinces and territories to reduce interprovincial trade barriers in the midst of the United States trade war with Canada. In January 2026, he visited India in a trade mission, seeking more investment into British Columbia.

The government's 2026 provincial budget forecasted a record deficit of over $13 billion and implemented public sector job cuts over three years. Following the budget release in February 2026, independent ratings agencies S&P & Moody's downgraded B.C.'s credit rating, marking the fifth credit downgrade in four years. Interim B.C. Conservative leader Trevor Halford was stated as saying this downgrade "puts provincial finances at risk, because of the growing interest costs."

==== Public safety ====
In June 2023, after issuing a new bail directive requiring Crown prosecutors to seek jail for alleged violent criminals unless public safety can be reasonably assured by bail conditions, Eby expressed disappointment that federal bail reform legislation was not passed before Parliament's summer break. A September 2023 stabbing attack by a Forensic Psychiatric Hospital patient in Vancouver's Chinatown prompted Eby to order a review into how the patient, previously found not criminally responsible for murder, was granted an unescorted day pass.

In August 2023, Eby announced a province-wide state of emergency as communities like West Kelowna, Kelowna, Lake Country, and the Shuswap were threatened by fast-moving wildfires. The 2023 wildfire season saw more than 400 structures destroyed across British Columbia. Eby and emergency management minister Bowinn Ma announced in September 2023 that they would establish a task force to make recommendations for future wildfire responses, such as increasing volunteer recruitment and providing more effective support for evacuees.

In mid-September, Eby announced that the province would begin to open facilities that would provide involuntary care under the Mental Health Act, allowing healthcare professionals to hold and treat individuals for a mental disorder against their will. This policy targeted people suffering with addictions, brain injury, and other mental-health issues. Eby also announced that his government would expand mental-health capacity at hospitals in BC by building more than 140 new beds and modernizing 280 existing ones.

==== Immigration ====
In December 2023, Eby stated that immigration is beneficial to the province, but that the province will need the federal government to help support the increasing number of people. In an interview with CBC, the Premier stated:

The numbers are such that we can’t support these folks. We're seeing significant exploitation of international students and temporary residents by employers, by landlords. We can't control the number of people coming in at the provincial level. The only way we're going to be able to get our hands around this exploitation issue is if we work with the federal government.

==== Education ====
In 2024, Eby announced a ban on the use of smartphones and tablets in BC Schools.

“We know that beyond just the impact on socialization, kids having access to apps with algorithms that feed them constantly, more enticing, more extreme content has an impact on their health,” he said.

==== Healthcare ====
In March 2023, Eby announced that prescription contraceptives would be provided free of charge beginning on April 1, 2023. The Canadian Society of Obstetricians and Gynecologists praised the decision.

On June 1, 2023, the BC government expanded the scope of practice for pharmacists. British Columbia pharmacists are now allowed to prescribe treatment for 21 minor ailments. Eby says this will free up doctors and hospitals for those with more complex care.

Toward the end of 2023, Eby's government adopted the International Credentials Recognition Act making it easier for foreign-trained doctors and nurses to work in British Columbia. This law entered into force on November 8, 2023.

In 2024, Eby was publicly accused by Richmond city councillor and former police officer Kash Heed of interfering with the healthcare decision to open an overdose prevention site near the city's hospital during a public health emergency.

== Personal life ==
Eby's wife, Cailey Lynch, is a former registered nurse who later studied medicine at UBC and is now a family doctor. They have three children. Eby has been a vegetarian since he was 14 after reading Diet for a New America.

== Elections ==
2026 British Columbia general election: Vancouver-Point Grey
| Party | Candidate | Votes | % | ±% | Expenditures |
|---|---|---|---|---|---|
| New Democratic | David Eby | 8,794 | 42.94 | −13.83 | |
| Conservative | Alex McMillan | 8,050 | 39.30 | +4.79 | |
| Green | Beatrice Sharpe | 2,876 | 14.04 | +5.32 | |
| CentreBC | Michael Davis | 737 | 3.60 | — | |
| Total valid votes / expenses limit | | 20,457 | 99.88 | | |
| Total rejected ballots | | 24 | 0.12 | | |
| Turnout | | 20,481 | | | |
| Registered voters | | TBA | | | |
| New Democratic hold | | Swing | | −9.31 | |
Source: Elections BC

2024 British Columbia general election: Vancouver-Point Grey
| Party | Candidate | Votes | % | ±% | Expenditures |
|---|---|---|---|---|---|
| New Democratic | David Eby | 12,538 | 56.77 | +7.2 | $47,403.30 |
| Conservative | Paul Ratchford | 7,622 | 34.51 | – | $61,135.35 |
| Green | Devyani Singh | 1,925 | 8.72 | –8.9 | $5,135.78 |
| Total valid votes / expenses limit | | 22,085 | 100.00 | – | $71,700.08 |
| Total rejected ballots | | 40 | 0.18 | – | |
| Turnout | | 22,125 | 63.43 | – | |
| Registered voters | | 34,880 | | | |
| New Democratic notional hold | | Swing | | – | |
Note: Change in percentage based on 2020 redistributed results.
Source: Elections BC

2020 British Columbia general election: Vancouver-Point Grey
| Party | Candidate | Votes | % | ±% | Expenditures |
|---|---|---|---|---|---|
| New Democratic | David Eby | 12,602 | 51.32 | −4.62 | $33,547.40 |
| Liberal | Mark Bowen | 7,712 | 31.41 | −1.75 | $36,024.26 |
| Green | Devyani Singh | 4,241 | 17.27 | +7.01 | $0.00 |
| Total valid votes | | 24,555 | 100.00 | – | |
| Total rejected ballots | | 96 | 0.39 | −0.01 | |
| Turnout | | 24,651 | 59.95 | −3.68 | |
| Registered voters | | 41,122 | | | |
| New Democratic hold | | Swing | | −1.44 | |
Source: Elections BC

2017 British Columbia general election: Vancouver-Point Grey
| Party | Candidate | Votes | % | ±% | Expenditures |
|---|---|---|---|---|---|
| New Democratic | David Eby | 14,195 | 55.94 | +8.35 | $72,150 |
| Liberal | James Lombardi | 8,414 | 33.16 | −10.03 | $71,630 |
| Green | Amanda Konkin | 2,604 | 10.26 | +3.49 | $1,525 |
| Independent | Brian Taylor | 85 | 0.34 | – | $0 |
| Your Political Party | David Stall | 77 | 0.30 | – | $368 |
| Total valid votes | | 25,375 | 100.00 | – | |
| Total rejected ballots | | 101 | 0.40 | +0.12 | |
| Turnout | | 25,476 | 63.63 | +4.66 | |
| Registered voters | | 40,037 | | | |
Source: Elections BC

2013 British Columbia general election: Vancouver-Point Grey
| Party | Candidate | Votes | % | ±% |
|---|---|---|---|---|
| New Democratic | David Eby | 11,499 | 47.59 | +2.40 |
| Liberal | Christy Clark | 10,436 | 43.19 | -5.54 |
| Green | Françoise Raunet | 1,636 | 6.77 | +3.35 |
| Conservative | Duane Nickull | 392 | 1.62 | – |
| Independent | William Gibbens | 72 | 0.30 | +0.12 |
| Libertarian | Marisa Palmer | 66 | 0.27 | – |
| Work Less | Hollis Jacob Linschoten | 51 | 0.21 | – |
| Platinum | Bernard Bedu Yankson | 11 | 0.05 | – |
| Total valid votes | | 24,163 | 100.00 | – |
| Total rejected ballots | | 69 | 0.28 | – |
| Turnout | | 24,232 | 58.97 | +20.03 |
| New Democratic gain from Liberal | | Swing | | +3.97 |
Source: Elections BC

British Columbia provincial by-election, May 11, 2011: Vancouver-Point Grey Resignation of Gordon Campbell
| Party | Candidate | Votes | % | ±% | Expenditures |
|---|---|---|---|---|---|
| Liberal | Christy Clark | 7,757 | 48.73 | -1.65 | $98,448 |
| New Democratic | David Eby | 7,193 | 45.19 | +4.91 | $77,889 |
| Green | Françoise Raunet | 545 | 3.42 | -5.36 | $309 |
| First | Danielle Alie | 379 | 2.38 | – | $35,785 |
| Independent | William Gibbens | 28 | 0.18 | – | $388 |
| Independent | Eddie Petrossian | 16 | 0.10 | – | $321 |
| Total valid votes | | 15,918 | 100 | – | |
| Total rejected ballots | | 33 | 0.21 | – | |
| Turnout | | 15,951 | 38.94 | -17.04 | |
| Liberal hold | | Swing | | -3.28 | |

== See also ==
- List of University of Waterloo people

British Columbia provincial government of John Horgan
Cabinet post (1)
| Predecessor | Office | Successor |
|---|---|---|
| Andrew Wilkinson | Minister of Justice and Attorney General of British Columbia; July 18, 2017 – July 19, 2022 | Murray Rankin |
Order of precedence
| Preceded by Christy Clark as 35th Premier of British Columbia | Order of precedence in British Columbia as of November 2026 | Succeeded by Teresa Wat as Speaker of the Legislative Assembly of British Columbia |
