= Qualicum =

Qualicum may refer to:

== Vancouver Island, British Columbia, Canada ==
- Qualicum Beach, a town
  - Qualicum College 1935–1970
- Qualicum Bay, a settlement
- Qualicum First Nation, a First Nations band government
- Qualicum River, or Big Qualicum River

== Ottawa, Ontario, Canada ==
- Qualicum-Graham Park, or Qualicum, a suburban neighbourhood
