= H. R. Milner =

Canadian lawyer and businessman (1889-1975)

Horatio Ray Milner CC QC
- Born: 27 March 1889; Sackville, New Brunswick, Canada
- Died: 24 May 1975 (aged 86); Qualicum, British Columbia, Canada
- Resting place: Saint Joachims Cemetery, Edmonton
- Education: King's College (B.A., 1909); Dalhousie University (LL.B., 1911)
- Political party: Progressive Conservative Party of Canada
- Spouses: Catherine Bury (m. 1919; died 1952) Veronica Villiers (m. 1954)
- Military career
- Allegiance: Canada
- Branch: Canadian Militia; Canadian Expeditionary Force
- Service years: 1916–1919
- Rank: Lieutenant
- Unit: 26th Battalion (New Brunswick), CEF
- Conflicts: World War I

Horatio Ray Milner CC QC (27 March 1889 – 24 May 1975) was a Canadian lawyer and businessman. Milner is known for his extensive involvement in the Canadian oil and gas industry, having served as the president of several major natural gas companies. His law practice, which ended as Fraser Milner Casgrain, was one of the group that merged in 2013 to form Dentons, the world's fifth largest firm.

== Biography ==
=== Early life ===
Milner was born in Sackville, New Brunswick, the son of lawyer, newspaper publisher and historian William Cochrane Milner (1846–1939) and his wife Sarah Althea Smith (1858–1932). He had one sibling, William Binney Milner (1891-1975). Milner was educated at King's Collegiate School in Windsor, Nova Scotia. He then entered King's College in Halifax, Nova Scotia, graduating Bachelor of Arts in 1909, and then entered law school at Dalhousie University, graduating Bachelor of Laws in 1911. Later in life, from 1957 to 1963 Milner served as the Chancellor of King's. Milner was called to the Nova Scotia Bar in 1911. At the time he graduated there was little demand in the Maritimes for lawyers. Partly due to a bronchial condition, his aunt urged him to move west. Milner arrived in Edmonton in 1912 and joined the firm Hyndman and Hyndman. That year he was called to the Alberta Bar.

=== War ===
Having previously served as a provisional lieutenant in the 101st Regiment "Edmonton Fusiliers" of the Non-Permanent Active Militia, on 5 February 1916 Milner was given a commission at the rank of captain in the 194th Battalion in the Canadian Expeditionary Force. Later that year he reverted to lieutenant and transferred to the 26th Battalion (New Brunswick). On 13 October 1916 he set sail aboard HMT Olympic for England. On 30 April 1918, while the battalion was stationed near Blairville, one of the battalion company headquarters was shelled by the Germans. Milner was slightly wounded but remained on duty. On the night of 31 March/1 April, the 26th relieved the 3rd Guards Brigade in the front line trenches near Neuville-Vitasse. Still on the front lines, on 6/7 May the battalion executed a nighttime raid on enemy posts. The raid consisted of four parties each comprising one officer and 21 men. Milner was placed in command of A Company. The raid was successful and resulted in the capture of two prisoners and one light machine gun. However, the enemy set off several bombs during the attack, one of which wounded Milner severely with shrapnel. Two days later the battalion was relieved and moved to Wailly, and Milner was sent to hospital at Rouen. On 23 May he was admitted to the Reading War Hospital in England. At the end of May he was transferred to the Canadian Convalescent Officers' Hospital in Matlock Bath, where he had his left thumb amputated while his right leg continued to heal. He was discharged on 13 August. By September he had been taken on strength again and was appointed an adjutant to the 26th. Following Armistice, on 3 January 1919 he was admitted to 12th Canadian General Hospital in Bramshott with hemoptysis, but was discharged three days later. Milner sailed home to Canada on 22 March 1919 and was decommissioned on 3 April.

=== Post-War career ===
Milner returned to Edmonton after the war and in 1921, age 32, was appointed a King's Counsel. In 1923 he was appointed counsel to Northwestern Utilities Limited, and shortly after took the same position with Canadian Western Natural Gas Limited and Canadian Utilities Limited. In 1932 he was made president of all three companies, holding these titles until 1949. After the creation of Trans-Canada Pipe Lines Limited in 1951, Milner was appointed its vice-president. He stayed in the role until he resigned in 1958.

The H. R. Milner Generating Station near Grande Cache, Alberta, was named for H. R. Milner on its dedication in 1972. Edmonton's Milner Building at 10040 104 Street, completed in 1958, was also named for him. Milner was made a Companion of the Order of Canada in 1969, the year he retired.

For ten years, Milner was the head of the Alberta Conservative Association and he served as the co-chairman for the 1942 Progressive Conservative leadership convention in Winnipeg. In the 1949 federal election Milner ran for the Conservatives in the Edmonton West riding, but lost to Liberal George Prudham.

=== Personal life ===
After he had first moved to Edmonton, Milner met Catherine "Rina" Bury (1887-1952), who at the time was married but estranged from her husband. Not having seen her for several years, in 1918 while recovering in a hospital in England, Milner reunited with Bury, now divorced, who was serving as a nurse. The couple fell in love there and married in 1919. They later had a daughter, Elizabeth (1930-2005). In 1937 the couple wanted to purchase a summer home and decided upon Qualicum Beach on Vancouver Island, a spot where several other Edmonton businessmen had homes. On 14 April 1937 they bought "Long Distance," a home at 2179 West Island Highway. The house had been built between 1929 and 1931 by Hilda Bayley, sister of Brigadier-General Noel Money, and was a bungalow in the style of a Ceylonese tea plantation house. Around 1940 Rina was diagnosed with a hereditary illness and in November 1952 died at age 65.

Sometime before Rina's death, Milner had met Veronica Villiers FitzGerald while on a trip to the United States. Veronica Villiers (1909-1998) was born to Reverend Ernest Amherst Villiers (1863-1933) of the aristocratic Villiers family, and Elaine Augusta Guest (1871-19??). Elaine was the daughter of Ivor Guest, 1st Baron Wimborne, and Lady Cornelia Henrietta Maria Spencer-Churchill, daughter of John Spencer-Churchill, 7th Duke of Marlborough. Veronica had married Desmond FitzGerald, 28th Knight of Glin in January 1929, one month before her 20th birthday. The couple had three children, including a son and heir Desmond (1937-2011). At the time Milner met Veronica, she was on a trip with her ailing husband trying to restore his health. After Desmond FitzGerald died in April 1949 of Tuberculosis, Milner and the now widowed Veronica FitzGerald rekindled their friendship. They married in 1954 when he was 65 and she 45.

The Milners twice hosted at Long Distance members of the Canadian Royal Family. Prince Charles and Princess Diana visited in 1986 and Queen Elizabeth and Prince Philip stayed there for three days in 1987.

Milner died on 24 May 1975 in Qualicum Beach. In 1996, two years before her death, Veronica Milner made a gift of Long Distance to Vancouver Island University. The university now runs the estate as the publicly accessible Milner Gardens & Woodlands as a living laboratory for VIU.
