= It Happened at Lakewood Manor =

1977 television film

- Promotional release poster
- Genre: Horror
- Written by: Guerdon Trueblood
- Directed by: Robert Scheerer
- Starring: Robert Foxworth; Lynda Day George; Bernie Casey; Barry Van Dyke; Karen Lamm; Myrna Loy; Brian Dennehy; Suzanne Somers
- Theme music composer: Kim Richmond
- Country of origin: United States
- Original language: English

Production
- Executive producer: Alan Landsburg
- Producer: Peter Nelson
- Production locations: Qualicum Beach, British Columbia
- Cinematography: Bernie Abramson
- Editor: George Folsey, Jr.
- Running time: 100 minutes
- Production company: Alan Landsburg Productions
- Budget: $1 million

Original release
- Network: ABC
- Release: December 2, 1977

It Happened at Lakewood Manor (also known as Ants or Panic at Lakewood Manor) is a 1977 American made-for-television horror film directed by Robert Scheerer and starring Lynda Day George, Suzanne Somers, Myrna Loy, Brian Dennehy and Bernie Casey. Its plot focuses on several guests staying at an aging mountain resort hotel that becomes overtaken by killer ants. It premiered on December 2, 1977 on ABC.

== Plot ==
During construction at the old, hard-pressed Lakewood Hotel, two workers stumble upon a swarm of ants in a closed section of the building. After discovering the ants to be unusually aggressive and dangerous, the workers attempt to get the warning out, but are accidentally buried alive.

Shortly after, the unscrupulous real estate magnate Anthony Fleming and his partner and mistress Gloria arrive at the hotel, there to haggle with the elderly proprietor, Ethel Adams and her daughter Valerie as they pursue plans to convert Lakewood into a casino. In the meantime, foreman Mike Carr, who is in a relationship with Valerie, and his co-worker and friend Vince find the two missing workers, dead from poisoning. The ants begin to emerge, attacking a boy, then killing a hotel cook, and nearly killing Vince as he and Mike investigate the pit in which their men were buried.

Peggy Kenter, a Board of Health (BOH) inspector and an acquaintance of Carr's, decides to quarantine the hotel, thinking a virus is at work. Mike soon discovers that there is an immense ant nest in the pit, and concludes that these insects are responsible for the attacks. Tom, a BOH researcher, finally discovers that the ants are highly venomous and resistant to insecticides.

By that time, the ants are swarming the hotel by the millions, killing Gloria and Peggy's assistant White and driving Carr, Valerie, Ethel, Fleming, hotel employee Richard and his girlfriend Linda upstairs. Vince alerts the authorities, who attempt to contain the ants with a trench—‌filled first with water, then with burning gasoline after Tom points out that army ants cross streams on bridges built from ant corpses—‌and rescue most of the people trapped inside the hotel. Carr, Valerie and Fleming, the only people remaining, are eventually cornered by the ants; Tom tells them not to move, in order to give the ants no reason to attack them. As the ants begin crawling all over them, Fleming panickedly launches himself from the room's balcony to the swimming pool below in a desperate attempt to escape, but misses the jump and dies in the fall. Shortly afterwards, two suited-up rescuers arrive and take Carr and Valerie to safety.

When they are taken away by the ambulance, Tom assures Carr that such a case will not likely be recurring, as the unique environmental conditions at the hotel estate were vital for the existence of the ants' nest.

== Cast ==
- Robert Foxworth as Mike Carr
- Lynda Day George as Valerie Adams
- Gerald Gordon as Anthony Fleming
- Bernie Casey as Vince
- Barry Van Dyke as Richard Cyril
- Karen Lamm as Linda Howard
- Myrna Loy as Ethel Adams
- Anita Gillette as Peggy Kenter
- Steve Franken as Lionel White
- Brian Dennehy as Fire Chief
- Suzanne Somers as Gloria Henderson
- Bruce French as Tom
- Barbara Brownell as Marjorie
- Stacy Keach Sr. as Doc
- René Enríquez as Luis
- Moosie Drier as Tommy
- Vincent Cobb as Peter
- Jim Storm as Attendant

== Production ==
The location for Lakewood Manor was The College Inn in Qualicum Beach, British Columbia, Canada. Principal photography began on July 12, 1977, with a projected shooting schedule lasting three weeks. At the time, the film had the working title Ants!. The production, whose budget was estimated at $1 million, brought approximately $250,000 in revenue to local businesses in Qualicum.

Stuntman Conrad Palmisano was buried alive for the film (with a garden hose supplying him air); he would later become chairman of the Screen Actors Guild's stunt and safety committee.

== Release ==
It Happened at Lakewood Manor premiered as an ABC Friday Night Movie on December 2, 1977. The film ranked 20th in the top television broadcasts for that week, tied with Little House on the Prairie.

=== Home media ===
It Happened at Lakewood Manor was released as Ants on DVD on February 9, 2014. It was released on blu-ray by Kino Lorber as Ants! on July 5, 2022 with a commentary track by film historian Lee Gambin.

== Reception ==
Ty Scout of the Abilene Reporter-News called the film "a reasonably predictable disaster-horror film" but conceded that it was entertaining.

Writing in Television Fright Films of the 1970s (2015), author David Deal described the film as "hilariously inept in every department: conception, scripting, direction, acting, photography, editing, etc. But it does manage to never be boring, and it is unintentionally funny quite often." In a 2020 retrospective for Film School Rejects, Rob Hunter noted that the film "is never dull throughout its ninety minutes, and scenes of the ants can’t help but raise pulses thanks to an excitable score and the fact that ants make you psychologically itchy."

== Sources ==
- Deal, David (2015). Television Fright Films of the 1970s. Jefferson, North Carolina: McFarland & Company. ISBN 978-0-786-45514-0.
