= Qualicum First Nation =

First Nation reserve in British Columbia, Canada

Qualicum First Nation Band No. 651
- Headquarters: 5850 River Road, Qualicum Beach
- Province: British Columbia

Land
- Main reserve: Qualicum

Qualicum First Nation is a First Nations band government located in Qualicum Bay at the mouth of the Big Qualicum River, near Qualicum Beach on Vancouver Island, British Columbia, Canada.

== Chief and Councillors ==
Position	Name	Term start	Term end	Reference
Chief	Michael Recalma	October 8, 2016	September 8, 2027	
Councillor	Stephen Ross Recalma	August 14, 2025	September 8, 2027	
Councillor	Tanna Weir	October 8, 2016	September 8, 2027	

== Demographics ==
Qualicum First Nation has 128 members. As of 2016 Census, there were 74 individuals living on the reserve.

The Qualicum First Nation campground opens every summer and closes every fall on part of the ocean front property. It is a campsite with ocean views and full R.V hook-ups.

Qualicum First Nation also owns and operates 3 licensed daycare facilities which are open to the public.

== See also ==
- Douglas Treaties
- Qualicum River
