= Noel Money =

Brigadier-General Noel Money CMG DSO* TD
- Born: 17 March 1867; Montreal, Quebec, Canada
- Died: 30 May 1941 (aged 74); Qualicum Beach, British Columbia, Canada
- Military career
- Allegiance: United Kingdom
- Branch: British Army
- Rank: Brigadier-General
- Units: Royal Welsh Fusiliers; Royal Irish Fusiliers; Shropshire Yeomanry
- Commands: 159th (Cheshire) Brigade; Royal Gloucestershire Hussars
- Conflicts: Second Boer War; First World War
- Awards: Companion of the Order of St Michael and St George; Distinguished Service Order & Bar; Territorial Decoration; Mentioned in Despatches
- Other work: Hotelier and golf club owner President Qualicum board of trade

Brigadier-General Noel Ernest Money, CMG, DSO & Bar, TD (17 March 1867 – 30 May 1941) was a senior officer in the British Army during the First World War.

Born in Canada but then educated and residing in England, Money first served in a militia infantry battalion. He transferred to a regular infantry battalion, before resigning and joining the Shropshire Yeomanry. He served in the Second Boer War and the First World War, being appointed a Companion of the Order of St Michael and St George and the Distinguished Service Order and Bar, for a second award.

In later life he returned to Canada becoming a hotelier and golf course owner. He was also the President of his local board of trade.

== Early life ==
Noel Ernest Money was born in Montreal, Canada, on 17 March 1867, the eldest son of Captain Albert William Money of the Royal Canadian Rifle Regiment. The family moved to Weybridge in England and Money was educated at Radley College, and Christ Church, University of Oxford.

== Military career ==
=== Second Boer War ===
In May 1886 Money became a militia officer in the 3rd Battalion Royal Welsh Fusiliers. In November 1888, as a regular army officer, he transferred to the Royal Irish Fusiliers, with the rank of second lieutenant. Then, in October 1891, the then Lieutenant Money resigned his regular commission. However, on 29 December 1899, he joined the yeomanry as a second lieutenant in the Shropshire Yeomanry, and was thus able to volunteer for service in the Second Boer War.

The following year Money was seconded for service with the Imperial Yeomanry, serving in the 13th (Shropshire) company of the 5th Battalion, where he was appointed a lieutenant on 3 February 1900. The company left Liverpool the same day, and arrived in Cape Town the following month. In South Africa he fought in the Transvaal and Cape Colony, in the battles at Venterskroon (7 and 9 August); the action at Lindley (1 July) and Rhenoster River. He also served with the South African Constabulary. During the war he was slightly wounded, and was promoted to temporary rank of captain on 20 October 1900, mentioned in despatches, and made a Companion of the Distinguished Service Order. He also received the two campaign medals, the Queen's South Africa Medal with three clasps, and the King's South Africa Medal with two clasps.

=== Between the wars ===
In April 1902 Money was promoted to lieutenant in the Shropshire Yeomanry, but for his service in South Africa retained the honorary rank of captain in the army. In November 1902, having up to now been a supernumerary officer, he was signed onto the establishment of the Shropshire Yeomanry.

In 1903, Money married Maud Boileau, the second daughter of Edward Wood of Culmington Manor, Shropshire, a High Sheriff of Shropshire. Together they had a son, Gordon, and daughter, Mary. Remaining in the yeomanry he was promoted to captain in April 1906, and major in November 1913.

Before that he had visited Canada, for a fishing trip to northern Ontario and Vancouver Island, where he purchased six lots of land at Qualicum Beach, intending to build a hotel. In February 1914, Money and his family arrived at Qualicum Beach, and he became the managing director of the Merchants Trust and Trading Company Limited and the Qualicum Water Company Limited.

=== First World War ===
Prior to the start of the war, in 1908, the Shropshire Yeomanry was assigned to the Welsh Border Mounted Brigade a constituent of the Territorial Force. A year after the start of the war Money, returned to England and rejoined his regiment. The regiment remained in England until March 1916, when together with the brigade sailed for Egypt. When they arrived the brigade amalgamated with the South Wales Mounted Brigade, to form the 4th Dismounted Brigade. In September 1916, he was promoted to temporary lieutenant-colonel and given command of the Royal Gloucestershire Hussars and two companies of a Territorial Force battalion from the Royal West Kent Regiment then in 1917, Money was awarded a bar, to signify a second award, to the Distinguished Service Order. In February 1918, he was promoted to temporary brigadier-general to command the 159th (Cheshire) Brigade, in the 53rd (Welsh) Division, which under his command captured the Mount of Olives at Jerusalem.

== Later life ==
In December 1918, Money was appointed a Companion of the Order of St Michael and St George, then, in June 1919, he relinquished his temporary rank of brigadier-general, returning to his substantive rank of major, and returned to Qualicum Beach. However, for his service, the following December, he was granted the honorary rank of brigadier-general.

In the early 1920s he purchased the Qualicum Beach Hotel and the nearby Qualicum Beach Golf Club. The hotel during this time had several noted guests, including amongst others; Bob Hope, Bing Crosby, Errol Flynn, Shirley Temple, Spencer Tracy and each Governor General of Canada. From November 1929 to November 1936, Money served as president of the Qualicum Board of Trade.

General Money died, aged 74, on 30 May 1941 and was buried in the graveyard of St Mark's Anglican Church, Qualicum Beach, British Columbia.

== Sources ==
- Bosher, John F. (2010). Imperial Vancouver Island: Who Was Who, 1850–1950. Xlibris Corporation. ISBN 978-1450059626.
- Bosher, John (2012). Vancouver Island in the Empire. Llumina Press. ISBN 978-1605948287.
- James, Brigadier E.A. (1978). British Regiments 1914–18. London: Samson Books. ISBN 0-906304-03-2.
