= Qualicum College =

Private school in Canada

Coordinates: 49.3575°N 124.4270°W

Qualicum College was a former private school located in Qualicum Beach, Canada. The school was founded in 1935 and closed in 1970. It was demolished in 2021.

== History ==
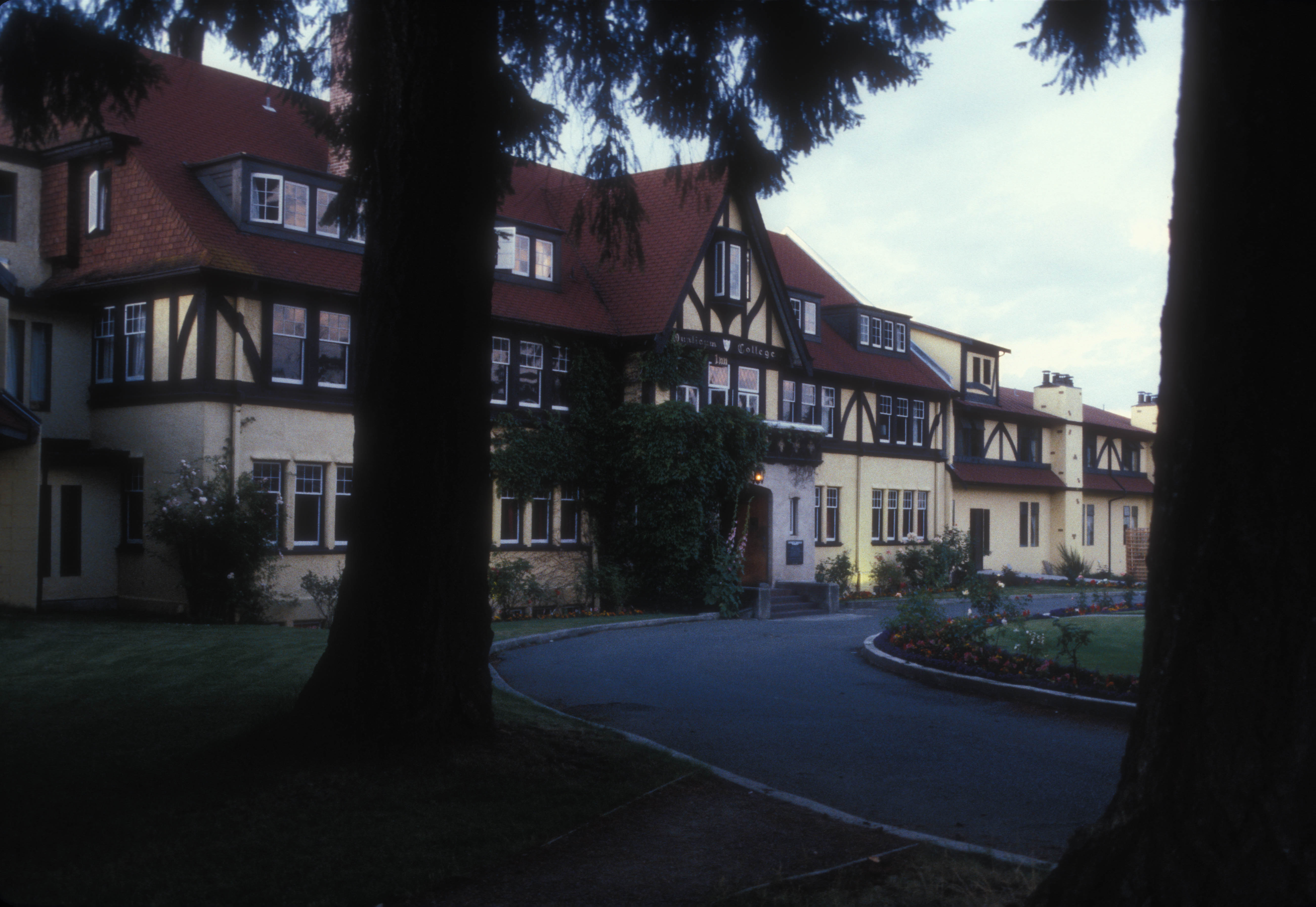
The building in 2008

In the late 1960's, costs increased and enrollment began to decline. While instruction in British Literature was excellent, other studies tended to be rote, aimed at the government exams. Undoubtedly, the increasing irrelevance of the curriculum, along with the use of the cane and other corporeal punishment, led to a decline. Sports participation was universal and passionate, especially in rugby. A military cadet program contributed outings such as war games and camping trips, but detracted from intellectual growth. A proctored three hour long nightly study hall enforced rote learning, however those who used the time to read benefited. In all, these retrograde educational programs became obsolete. Public education was making strides during this era, advances difficult to replicate in a discipline based curriculum. In 1970 the Knight brothers closed the college.

The school's playing fields were subsequently subdivided for a housing estate; the Tudor-style main building was purchased by a group who transformed it into the Qualicum College Inn.

In the mid-1970s, the Inn was the main location for It Happened at Lakewood Manor, a made-for-television film that premiered in December 1977.

The hotel owner had sought permission to redevelop the property as a 90-unit residential condominium in 2007 but the application was withdrawn. Demolition of additions to the building added in the 1970s began in January 2008.

In 2010, the Aboriginal Issues Press at the University of Manitoba published a history on the school.

By 2011, developers began to convert the hotel and surrounding property into Qualicum College Heights, a complex of 40 condominiums.

In 2021, the Qualicum Beach Town Council voted to revoke the heritage status on Qualicum College Heights so that it could be replaced with a replica. Upon completion of the demolition, the land was listed for $6.6 million dollars.
