= Qualicum River =

Coordinates: 49°24′00″N 124°37′00″W

The Qualicum River or Big Qualicum River ("Where the Dog Salmon Run" in the Pentlatch language) is a river on the east coast of Vancouver Island, British Columbia, Canada, flowing northeast from its headwaters in Horne Lake into the Strait of Georgia just south of Qualicum Bay, near the town of Qualicum Beach.

== See also ==
- List of rivers of British Columbia
