= Qualicum Bay =

Settlement in British Columbia, Canada

Coordinates: 49.398°N 124.613°W

Location of Qualicum Bay in British Columbia

Qualicum Bay is a settlement in British Columbia and is served by the coast-spanning Island Highway and the Island Rail Corridor.

== Climate ==
Climate data for Qualicum
Month	Jan	Feb	Mar	Apr	May	Jun	Jul	Aug	Sep	Oct	Nov	Dec	Year
Mean daily maximum °C (°F)	5.7 (42.3)	7.3 (45.1)	9.5 (49.1)	12.7 (54.9)	16.4 (61.5)	19.1 (66.4)	22.0 (71.6)	21.8 (71.2)	18.4 (65.1)	13.0 (55.4)	8.3 (46.9)	5.8 (42.4)	13.3 (55.9)
Mean daily minimum °C (°F)	0.3 (32.5)	0.8 (33.4)	1.6 (34.9)	4 (39)	7.0 (44.6)	9.9 (49.8)	11.6 (52.9)	11.3 (52.3)	8.4 (47.1)	5.2 (41.4)	2.4 (36.3)	0.7 (33.3)	5.2 (41.4)
Average precipitation mm (inches)	190 (7.6)	160 (6.4)	120 (4.7)	69 (2.7)	51 (2)	48 (1.9)	28 (1.1)	36 (1.4)	51 (2)	140 (5.4)	220 (8.6)	200 (7.9)	1,310 (51.7)
Source: Weatherbase

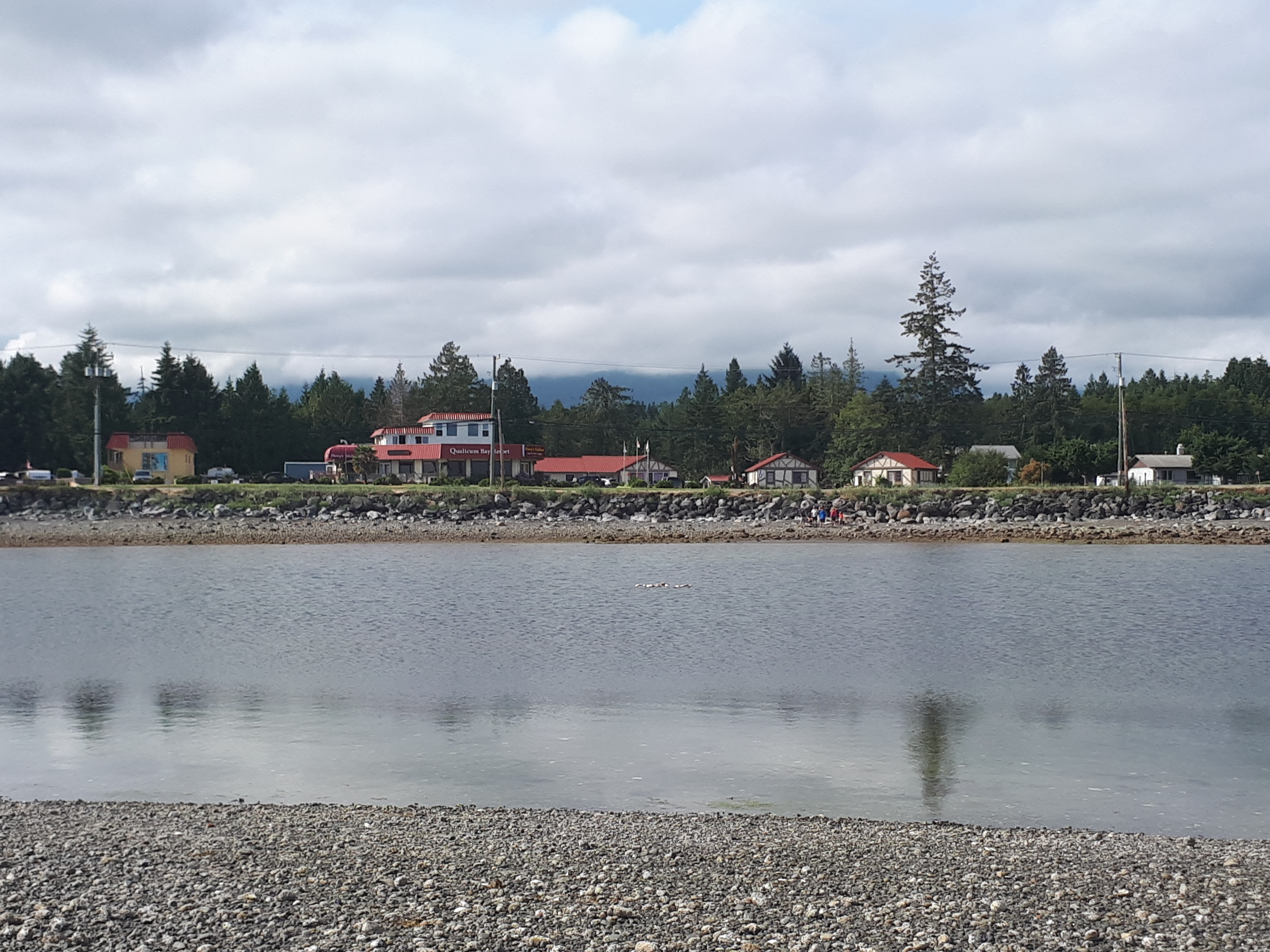
Qualicum Bay Resort at Qualicum Bay

== See also ==
- List of communities in British Columbia
- Qualicum Beach
