= Qualicum Beach =

Town in British Columbia, Canada

- Town
- Town of Qualicum Beach
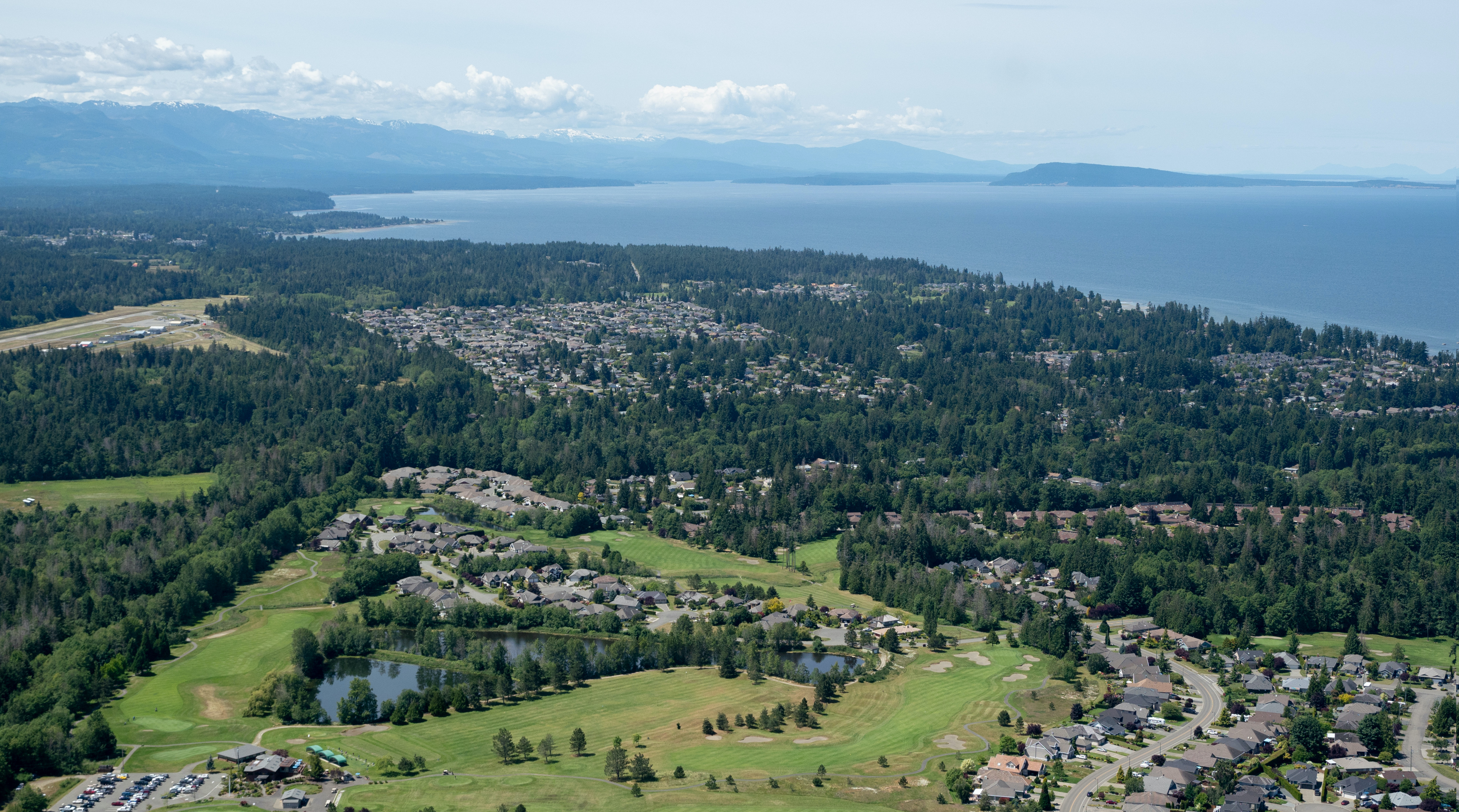
- Aerial view of Qualicum Beach

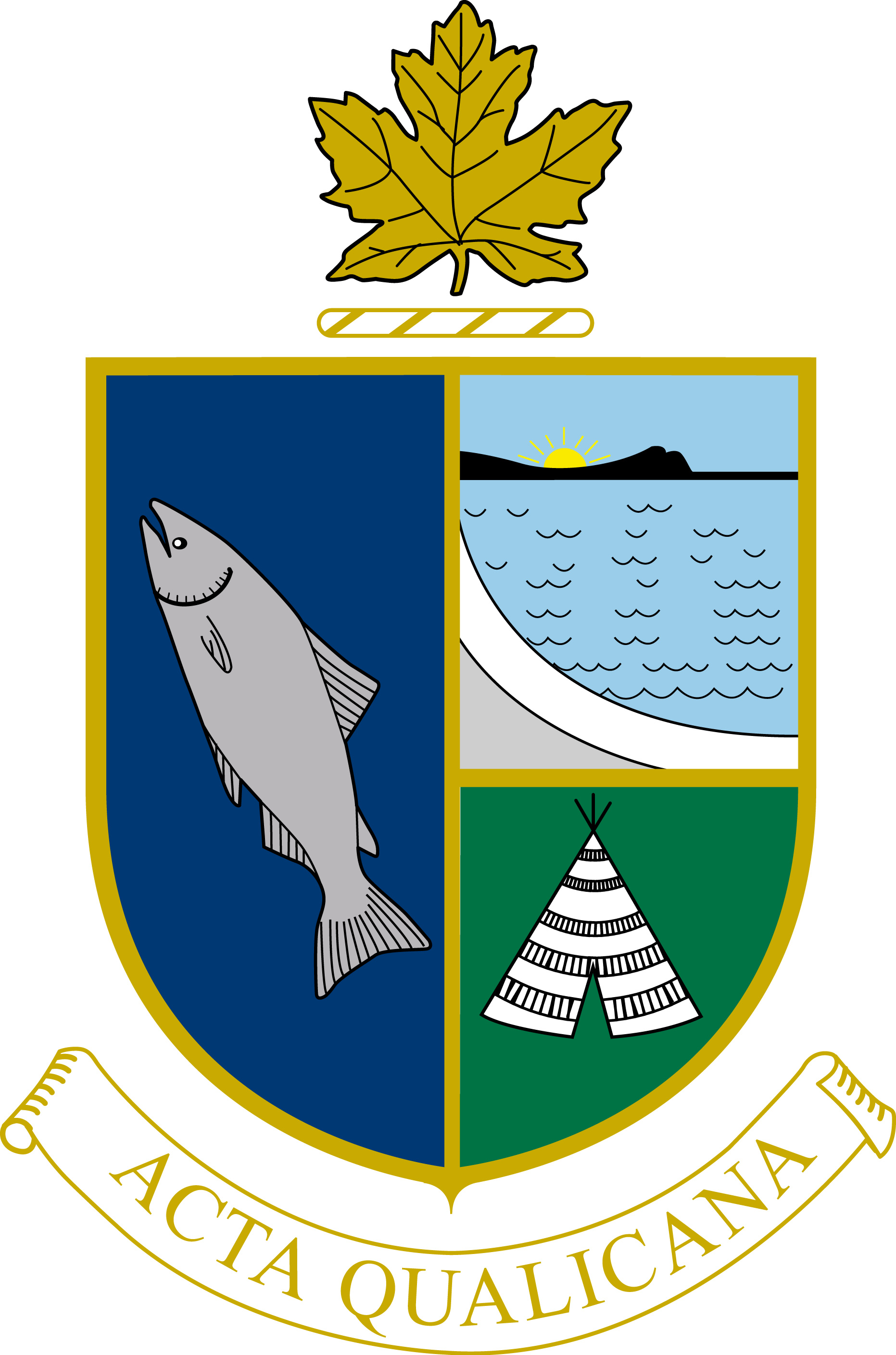

- Location of Qualicum Beach in British Columbia Qualicum Beach (British Columbia)
- Coordinates: 49°21′N 124°26′W
- Country: Canada
- Province: British Columbia
- Regional district: Nanaimo
- Established: As a village: 1943
- As a town: 1983

Government
  - Mayor: Teunis Westbroek
  - Governing body: Qualicum Beach Town Council

Area
  - Total: 17.98 km^{2} (6.94 sq mi)
- Elevation: 8 m (26 ft)

Population (2021)
  - Total: 9,303
  - Density: 517.5/km^{2} (1,340/sq mi)
- Time zone: UTC– 07:00 (PT)
- Forward sortation area: V9K
- Area code: 250
- Website: www.qualicumbeach.com

Qualicum Beach (/ˈkwɒlɪkəm/) is a town located on Vancouver Island, British Columbia, Canada. In the 2021 census, it had a population of 9,303. It is situated at the foot of Mount Arrowsmith, along the Salish Sea on Vancouver Island's northeastern coast.

Qualicum Beach's natural environment and proximity to Victoria and Vancouver have made it a tourist destination, with cottages along the coast. The community is mostly of retirement age, with the oldest average population in Canada with a median age of 65.9 in 2016.

Qualicum Beach is served by the coast-spanning Island Highway, the Island Rail Corridor, a local airport, and a nearby ferry to Lasqueti Island.

== History ==
=== Etymology ===
The name "Qualicum" comes from a Pentlatch term that means "Where the dog salmon (chum salmon) run."

=== Qualicum First Nation ===
Qualicum Beach is located within the traditional territory of the Qualicum First Nation.

People from all over would come to the Qualicum area to gather camas flowers in the spring and chum salmon in the fall. Camas bulbs are sweet tasting and were traded as a delicacy. The traditional diet of the Qualicum First Nation includes clams, including geoducks, butter clams, and horse clams. Pentlatch is the language that was spoken in this area. A large portion of the Qualicum First Nation population was lost due to small pox and war, leading to a loss of the Pentlatch language. Small pox was brought to what is now Canada by French settlers in the 17th century. Additionally, the loss of the Pentlatch language may also be attributed to the residential school system.

=== European settlers ===
In May 1856, Hudson's Bay Company explorer Adam Grant Horne, with a group of aboriginal guides, found a route across Vancouver Island from the Qualicum River to the Alberni Inlet. Horne Lake is named after him.

In 1864, the botanist and explorer Robert Brown led the Vancouver Island Exploring Expedition through the area. He found the area deserted as a result of the small pox epidemic of 1862. The first settlers arrived in the 1880s.

A road was built from Nanaimo to Parksville in 1886 and extended to Qualicum in 1894.

=== The 20th century ===
A school house was built in 1912. The school served as an elementary and secondary school until 1952. The school house was later converted into an arts centre.

A train station was built in 1913. The E&N Railway reached Qualicum in 1914.

H.E. Beasley, a railway official, sponsored the creation of The Merchants Trust and Trading Company which organised the original layout of the town and built the golf links and the Qualicum Beach Hotel in 1913. The Qualicum Beach Hotel was managed by Noel Money. During World War 1 the hotel was used as a hospital, which was visited by the Prince of Wales in 1918. Visitors to the hotel included Shirley Temple, Bing Crosby, and the King of Thailand. The hotel was eventually torn down in 1969. The golf course (Memorial Golf Course) remains and is preserved by the Town of Qualicum Beach.

In 1914, the residence of Noel Money, the Crown Mansion, was built. The Crown Mansion overlooks the town's first golf course, the Memorial Golf Course, and is built in a Georgian Revival style. The Crown Mansion is now protected by the Brown Preservation Society and operates as a hotel.

In the 1920s, Giuseppe Roat, also known as the Hermit of Qualicum Beach, moved to the area. He opened the first museum in Qualicum Beach, called the Crystal Springs Museum of Nature Art. Alongside the museum, Roat also had a spring called Crystal Spring. Visitors could drink from the spring for 25 cents. Roat purchased 75 lots in the area of Qualicum Beach, totalling 44 acres. This land is now what is known as the Hermitage Park subdivision.

In the 1930s, Alexander Duncan McRae and his wife Blaunche built an upscale family retreat, known as Eaglecrest, in Qualicum Beach. Visitors included Princess Elizabeth and the Duke of Edinburgh in 1951. In the late 1960s, Eaglecrest was converted into a resort. A fire in 1969 burnt down the main house. In 1972, the new owners replicated the original house and opened a golf course. In 1981 a fire once again destroyed Eaglecrest.

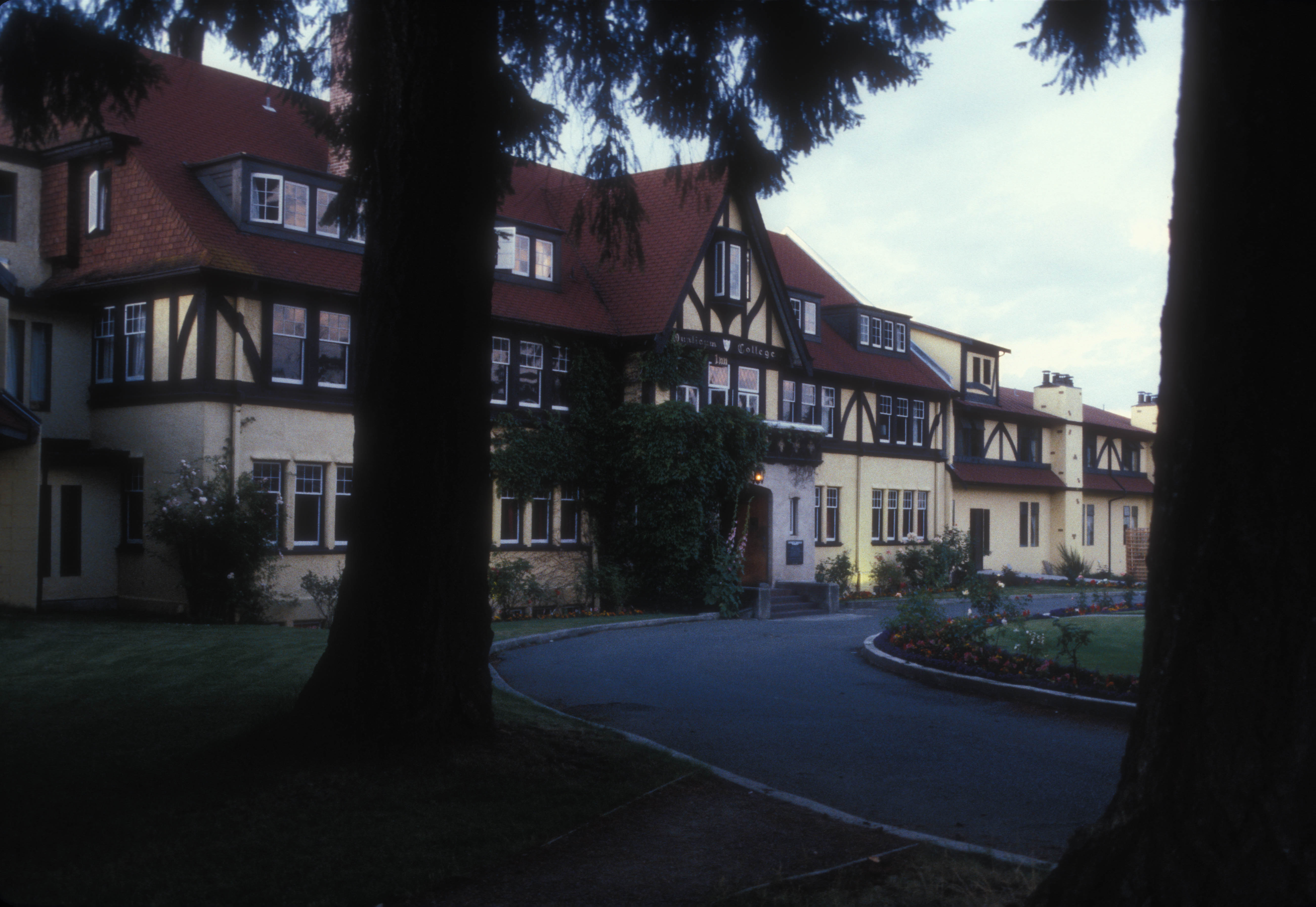
Qualicum College

A private boys' residential school, the Qualicum College, was established in 1935 by Robert Ivan Knight. The school grew through the 1960s, however, attendance diminished with the school closing in 1970. The structure was operated as a hotel for a number of years, however, the college has now been demolished. Its playing fields have been turned into a housing subdivision.

St. Andrews Lodge, a hotel built in a Tudor style, was built in 1938 by Sam Little. The Lodge was especially popular during World War 2 with members of the Canadian armed forces.

Qualicum Beach was officially incorporated as a village on May 5, 1942, and was changed to town status on January 7, 1983.

=== The 21st century ===
In 2002, the town's primary grocery store, Qualicum Foods, was destroyed by a fire. In 2003 a new Qualicum Foods was built. In 2021, Qualicum Beach councillor Teunis Westbroek was sued for allegedly suggesting that the owners of Qualicum Foods burnt down their own store in 2002. In 2023 Westbroek agreed to pay $130,000 to settle the defamation suit and issued a public apology in the local newspaper. Ultimately, Westbroek only paid $2,839 personally. The rest of the settlement was covered by the Town's liability insurance and the Town paid a $10,000 deductible.

In 2007, the Gardens, a long-term care facility, was built in Qualicum Beach. Another retirement home, Berwick, opened in 2019. There are currently 5 retirement homes in Qualicum Beach.

Trains stopped operating in 2011. The station is now used as an office space.

St. Andrews Lodge was purchased by the Town of Qualicum Beach in 2018 with hopes to transform the land into a waterfront park. The Town considered demolishing the Lodge. In late 2020 The St. Andrew Lodge Cultural and Historical Society was formed by local residents, with the goal of saving the Lodge from demolition. They succeeded in this goal, and the Lodge and park is currently being renovated. Qualicum First Nation gifted the new name of "Saahtlam" for the park.

== Demographics ==
In the 2021 Census of Population conducted by Statistics Canada, Qualicum Beach had a population of 9,303 living in 4,435 of its 4,763 total private dwellings, a change of 4% from its 2016 population of 8,943. With a land area of 17.98 km^{2} (6.94 sq mi), it had a population density of 517.4/km^{2} (1,340.1/sq mi) in 2021.

=== Age ===
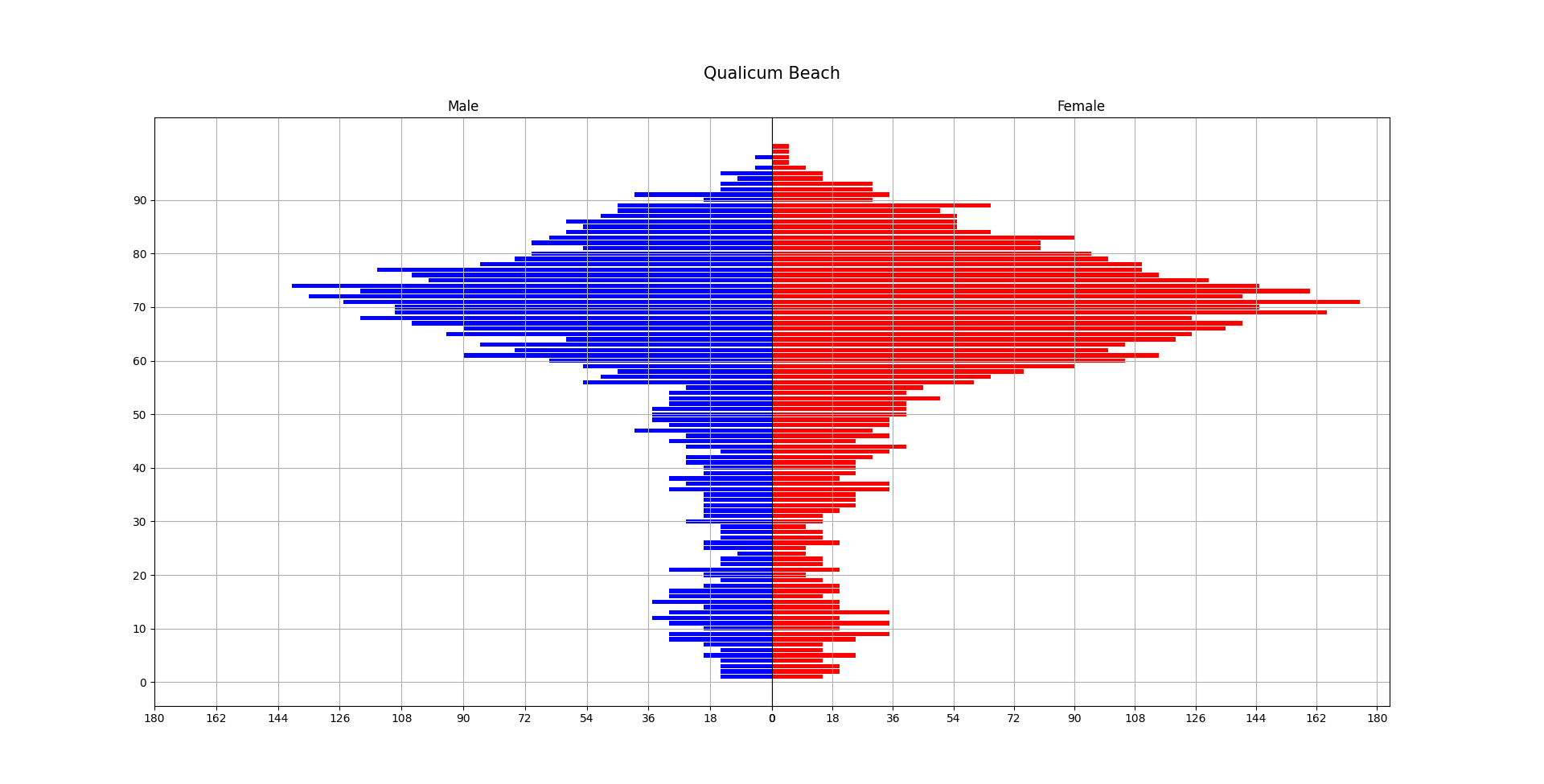
Population Pyramid per 2021 Canadian census

The majority (56.3% in 2021) of residents are 65 years of age or older. The median age in 2021 was 67.5 and the average age was 61.2.

=== Education ===
The majority (92.8% in 2021) of citizens aged 25 to 64 have obtained a high school diploma or equivalency certificate. 64% of citizens have obtained a postsecondary certificate, diploma, or degree.

According to the 2021 census, the most common major fields of study of citizens in Qualicum Beach included:

- Business, management, and public administration (1,130 persons or 37.6%)
- Architecture, engineering, and related trades (895 persons or 29.8%)
- Health and related fields (855 persons or 28.5%)
- Education (635 persons or 21.1%)
- Social and behavioural sciences and law (475 persons or 15.8%)

=== Occupation and Income ===
The median total income of households in 2020 was $76,500.

Of the labour force, 55% work as permanent employees and 32% are self-employed. The remaining hold casual, seasonal, temporary, short-term, or fixed (1 year or more) term positions. As of 2021, 7.7% of the population is unemployed. The majority (65.5% in 2021) of the population is not in the labour force.

According to the 2021 census, the most common occupational categories in Qualicum Beach included:

- Sales and service (705 persons or 25.5%)
- Business, finance, and administration (515 persons or 18.6%)
- Trades, transport, and equipment operators (485 persons or 17.5%)
- Education, law and social, community and government services (300 persons or 10.8%)
- Health (255 persons or 9.2%)
- Natural and applied sciences (210 persons or 7.6%)

=== Ethnicity ===
According to the 2021 census, the ethnic or cultural origin of citizens in Qualicum Beach included:

- English (3,315 persons or 37.8%)
- Irish (1,955 persons or 22.3%)
- Scottish (2,115 persons or 24.1%)
- German (1,040 persons or 11.9%)
- French (770 persons or 8.8%)
- Canadian (735 persons or 8.4%)
- Ukrainian (515 persons or 5.9%)
- Dutch (415 persons or 4.7%)

Panethnic groups in the Town of Qualicum Beach (2001–2021)
Panethnic group	2021		2016		2011		2006		2001	
Panethnic group	Pop.	%	Pop.	%	Pop.	%	Pop.	%	Pop.	%
European (Note: Statistic includes all persons that did not make up part of a visible minority or an indigenous identity.)	8,205	93.5%	8,030	94.42%	7,810	95.07%	7,945	94.87%	6,665	96.32%
Indigenous	280	3.19%	290	3.41%	205	2.5%	155	1.85%	75	1.08%
East Asian (Note: Statistic includes total responses of "Chinese", "Korean", and "Japanese" under visible minority section on census.)	105	1.2%	70	0.82%	75	0.91%	165	1.97%	50	0.72%
Southeast Asian (Note: Statistic includes total responses of "Filipino" and "Southeast Asian" under visible minority section on census.)	80	0.91%	65	0.76%	35	0.43%	35	0.42%	65	0.94%
South Asian	50	0.57%	20	0.24%	30	0.37%	55	0.66%	55	0.79%
African	20	0.23%	20	0.24%	10	0.12%	0	0%	0	0%
Middle Eastern (Note: Statistic includes total responses of "West Asian" and "Arab" under visible minority section on census.)	10	0.11%	0	0%	0	0%	0	0%	10	0.14%
Latin American	0	0%	10	0.12%	25	0.3%	10	0.12%	0	0%
Other/multiracial (Note: Statistic includes total responses of "Visible minority, n.i.e." and "Multiple visible minorities" under visible minority section on census.)	0	0%	20	0.24%	0	0%	15	0.18%	0	0%
Total responses	8,775	94.32%	8,505	95.1%	8,215	94.57%	8,375	98.51%	6,920	99.99%
Total population	9,303	100%	8,943	100%	8,687	100%	8,502	100%	6,921	100%
Note: Totals greater than 100% due to multiple origin responses.

=== Religion ===
According to the 2021 census, religious groups in Qualicum Beach included:

- Irreligion (4,615 persons or 52.6%)
- Christianity (4,015 persons or 45.7%)
- Judaism (30 persons or 0.3%)
- Buddhism (20 persons or 0.2%)
- Islam (20 persons or 0.2%)
- Other (65 persons or 0.7%)

== Politics and government ==
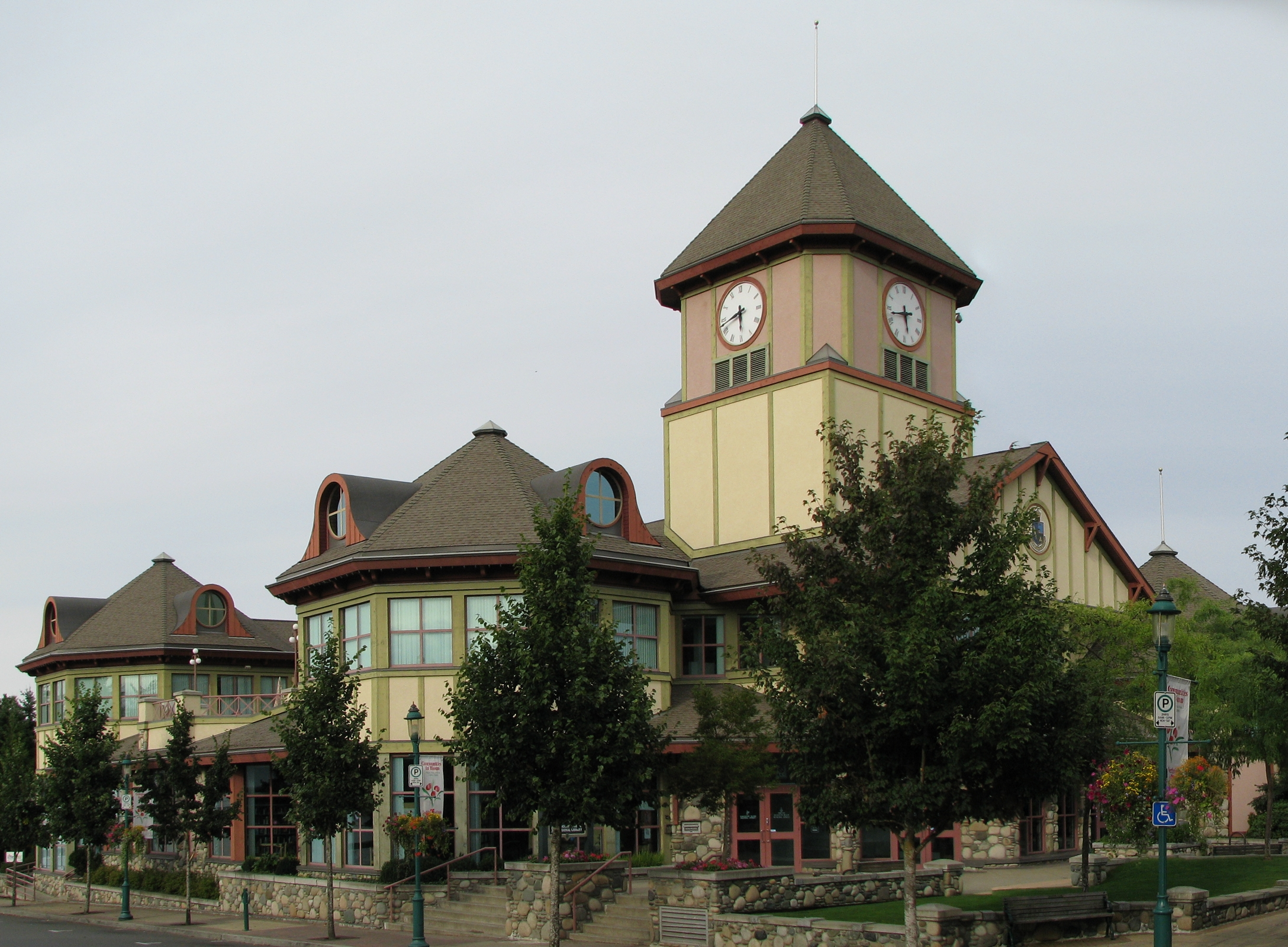
Town Hall, Qualicum Beach

Municipal government of the Town of Qualicum Beach has a council-manager form of government. It is headed by a mayor (who also represents Qualicum Beach on the governing board of the Regional District of Nanaimo) and a four-member council. These positions are filled by at-large elections every four years, as provided by British Columbia law. As of October 2022, the current mayor of Qualicum Beach is Teunis Westbroek. Voter turnout in the 2022 election was 52.53%.

School board trustees, for representation on School District 69 Qualicum, are also elected by residents of the town, the City of Parksville and the surrounding area. The town funds a volunteer fire department, which serves the town and nearby rural communities. The town has a local ambulance station. The nearest full hospital is Nanaimo Regional General Hospital in Nanaimo.

Qualicum Beach is part of the Parksville-Qualicum provincial electoral district. Qualicum Beach is represented by Independent Adam Walker. Walker was dismissed from his position as a parliamentary secretary and removed from the BC NDP caucus following an internal investigation. Federally, Qualicum Beach, in the Courtenay—Alberni riding, is represented in the House of Commons of Canada by NDP member of parliament Gord Johns, who was first elected in 2015.

== Transportation ==
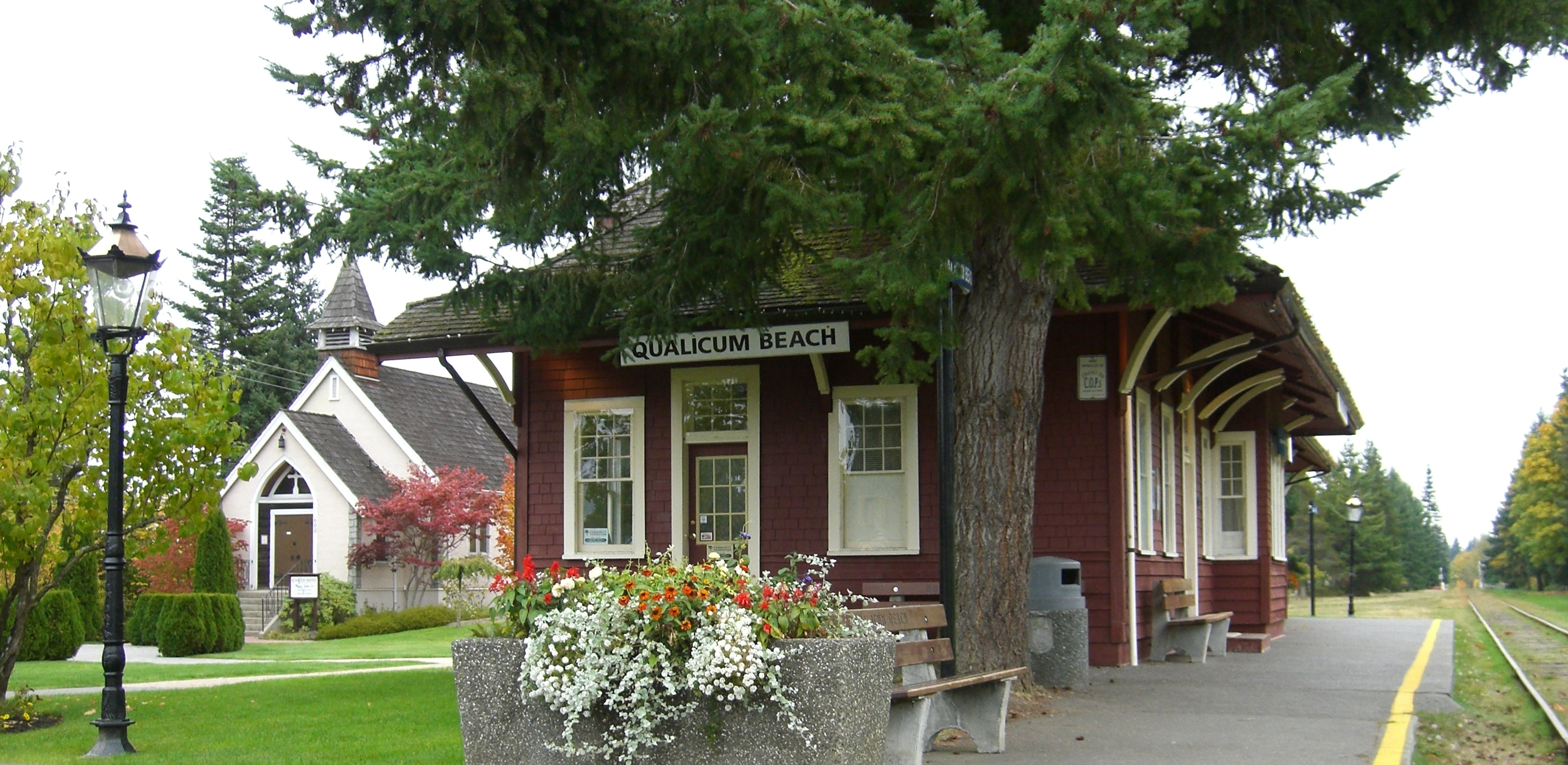
Historic Qualicum Beach Train Station

Highway 19A, runs the length of the town along the shoreline of the Salish Sea. Highway 19 includes a junction with Highway 4, which runs through Cathedral Grove to Port Alberni and Tofino, Ucluelet, Bamfield and the Pacific Rim National Park Reserve on the south-west coast of the Island. Scenic, flight training and charter flights are offered by Qualicum Flight Center. The town has no marina or harbour, however, there is a boat launch for trailered boats. French Creek Harbour is 5 kilometres (3.1 mi) south-east on Highway 19A.

Via Rail's Malahat service served Qualicum Beach station from 1979 until 2011. In 2011, service was suspended indefinitely due to track replacement work. As of 2015, service has not yet resumed.

== Geography ==
The town has an approximate area of 12.45 square kilometres (4.81 sq mi).

Qualicum Beach is on the Nanaimo lowlands, a narrow plain which lies between the Georgia Basin to the northeast and the Beaufort Range (one of the Vancouver Island Ranges) to the south-west. Landforms were significantly changed by the most recent advance of glacial ice about 18,000 to 19,000 years ago.

Marshall-Stevenson Wildlife Sanctuary, in the west end of Qualicum Beach, is a tidal wetlands at the mouth of the Little Qualicum River.

Wildlife include: Black-tailed Deer, Roosevelt elk, black bear, and cougar. With the presence of human population, deer, raccoons and rodents persist.

Soil types in the area, mostly classified as Orthic Dystric Brunisols and Duric Dystric Brunisols, vary from marginal to unsuitable for agriculture. They tend to be loamy sand or gravelly loamy sand. Their fertility is low and they are strongly acidic except in near-shore areas where Native American shell middens provide abundant calcium and organic matter. However, they are suitable for development.

=== Climate ===
The climate is a Mediterranean Climate. The town has cool, wet winters with 80 to 85% of the year's precipitation between October and April. The average annual precipitation is 131 centimetres (52 in). Mean daily temperature ranges from 1 to 3 °C (34 to 37 °F) in January, with cloud and rain from north Pacific air masses dominating the winter weather. High pressure ridges over the mainland can produce easterly air flows, bringing snow and freezing temperatures during winter but do not persist, as moist westerly winds bring above-freezing temperatures. North Pacific high pressure cells influence summer weather, making it warm and dry. July and August have an average precipitation of 27 millimetres (1.1 in) and average maximum temperatures of 23 °C (73 °F).

With the longest freeze-free period in Canada, at 180 days per year, the Nanaimo lowlands area is favourable for agriculture. The area is within the small Coastal Douglas Fir bio-geographic zone, which is considered the mildest climate in Canada. The Vancouver Island Ranges, which includes nearby Mount Arrowsmith, shadows rainfall. This bio-geographic area can also support Garry Oak and Arbutus.

Climate data for Little Qualicum Hatchery
Month	Jan	Feb	Mar	Apr	May	Jun	Jul	Aug	Sep	Oct	Nov	Dec	Year
Record high °C (°F)	15.5 (59.9)	18.5 (65.3)	22.5 (72.5)	25.5 (77.9)	31.5 (88.7)	32.0 (89.6)	34.5 (94.1)	34.0 (93.2)	33.0 (91.4)	23.5 (74.3)	18.5 (65.3)	14.5 (58.1)	34.5 (94.1)
Mean daily maximum °C (°F)	6.4 (43.5)	7.8 (46.0)	10.3 (50.5)	13.3 (55.9)	17.1 (62.8)	19.9 (67.8)	22.9 (73.2)	22.9 (73.2)	19.6 (67.3)	13.6 (56.5)	8.7 (47.7)	5.9 (42.6)	14.0 (57.2)
Mean daily minimum °C (°F)	0.0 (32.0)	−0.4 (31.3)	0.8 (33.4)	2.6 (36.7)	5.8 (42.4)	8.5 (47.3)	10.4 (50.7)	9.7 (49.5)	6.7 (44.1)	4.0 (39.2)	1.6 (34.9)	0.0 (32.0)	4.2 (39.6)
Record low °C (°F)	−14.0 (6.8)	−17.5 (0.5)	−9 (16)	−3.5 (25.7)	−2.0 (28.4)	2.5 (36.5)	4.0 (39.2)	3.0 (37.4)	−2.5 (27.5)	−8.0 (17.6)	−18.0 (−0.4)	−17.5 (0.5)	−18.0 (−0.4)
Average precipitation mm (inches)	167.1 (6.58)	114.0 (4.49)	99.1 (3.90)	64.2 (2.53)	49.1 (1.93)	42.4 (1.67)	22.7 (0.89)	31.8 (1.25)	40.7 (1.60)	113.4 (4.46)	182.3 (7.18)	156.2 (6.15)	1,082.9 (42.63)
Average rainfall mm (inches)	155.5 (6.12)	106.8 (4.20)	94.9 (3.74)	64.2 (2.53)	49.1 (1.93)	42.4 (1.67)	22.7 (0.89)	31.8 (1.25)	40.7 (1.60)	112.9 (4.44)	177.0 (6.97)	149.7 (5.89)	1,047.8 (41.25)
Average snowfall cm (inches)	11.6 (4.6)	7.1 (2.8)	4.2 (1.7)	0.0 (0.0)	0.0 (0.0)	0.0 (0.0)	0.0 (0.0)	0.0 (0.0)	0.0 (0.0)	0.5 (0.2)	5.2 (2.0)	6.5 (2.6)	35.2 (13.9)
Average precipitation days (≥ 0.2 mm)	20.5	16.1	18.3	16.1	13.8	12.1	7.2	7.1	8.8	16.6	21.1	19.1	176.6
Average rainy days (≥ 0.2 mm)	19.3	15.1	17.9	16.1	13.8	12.1	7.2	7.1	8.8	16.5	20.4	18.2	172.4
Average snowy days (≥ 0.2 cm)	2.3	1.7	0.96	0.0	0.0	0.0	0.0	0.0	0.0	0.08	1.4	1.5	7.9
Source: Environment Canada

== Education ==
Qualicum Beach is part of School District 69. There are two elementary schools in Qualicum Beach and one high school. Students in the district can also enroll in distance education through CEAP (Collaborative Education Alternative Program).

=== Kwalikum Secondary School ===
Kwalikum Secondary School (KSS) is the only high school located in Qualicum Beach. Approximately 700 students are enrolled. The school offers programmes such as ROAMS, a leadership programme featuring outdoor guide training; Golf Academy, a year long training programme that covers golf swing instruction, golf etiquette, and course management; a music programme, and athletics. In the past, the school has faced potential closure due to fears of decreasing enrolment.

=== Qualicum Beach Elementary School ===
Qualicum Beach Elementary School is one of two elementary school in Qualicum Beach and has approximately 400 students enrolled. The school offers programmes such as the Mountain Bike Club, featuring weekly treks through woodlands; a Musical Theatre Club, putting on several performances each year; and the STREAM programme, a programme focused on technology and innovation.

=== Arrowview Elementary School ===
Arrowview Elementary School is an elementary school in Qualicum Beach. The school has approximately 300 students.

== Culture, recreation, and leisure ==
=== Events ===
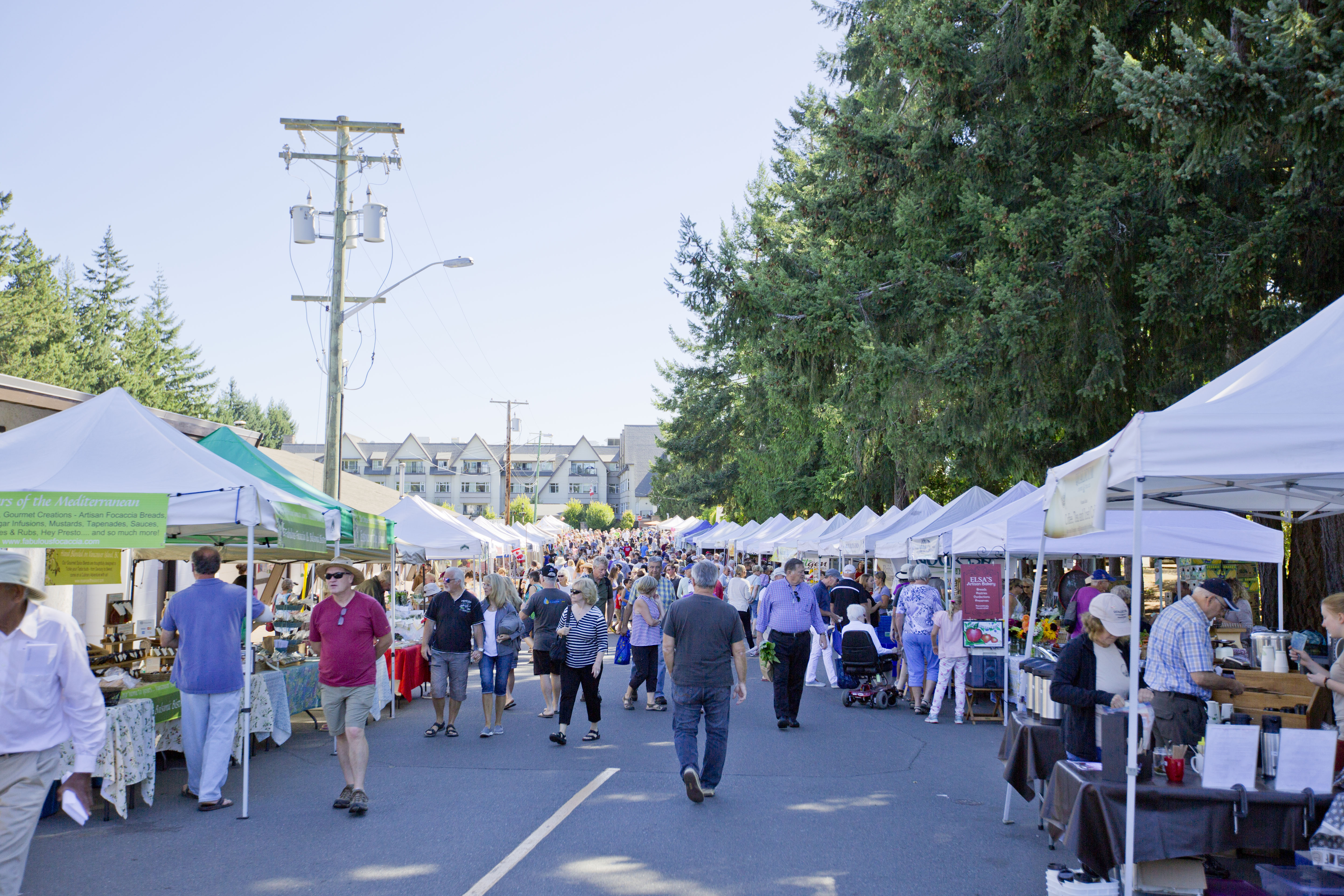
The Farmers Market

==== Farmers Market ====
The Farmers Market takes place every Saturday and is year round. All products must adhere to a "Make it, Bake it, Grow it" policy, meaning that all products are locally made, grown, or baked by the vendors. The first Qualicum Beach Farmers Market took place in 1997, with approximately 20 regular vendors in its first year. The market currently takes place on Veterans Way and features approximately 100 vendors and sees approximately 2,500 visitors each Saturday.

==== Canada Day ====
Each year on July 1, the town of Qualicum Beach and the Royal Canadian Legion hold a Pancake breakfast, parade, and activities around town. The parade usually starts at the Civic Centre goes down Second Avenue. The event was cancelled for two years during the COVID-19 pandemic.

==== Family Day ====
Family Day is an annual event taking place on the last Sunday of May in Qualicum Beach, with each year featuring a unique theme. Activities include a pancake breakfast, a parade, music and other live entertainment.

==== Brant Wildlife Festival ====
The Brant Wildlife Festival is an annual 4 week long event that celebrates nature, in particular the Brant goose. Activities include counting Brant geese, estuary and field station tours, and a film festival.

==== Show & Shine ====
The Seaside Cruizers Car Club hosts an annual Father's day Show 'n Shine day, where vintage and collectible cars are featured. Over 30,000 spectators come to Qualicum Beach per year for the event. Trophies and prizes are handed out, such as "Best Truck", "Best Import", and "People's Choice".

==== Seedy Saturday ====
Seedy Saturday is an annual gardening event in Qualicum Beach run by volunteers. Visitors may swap or purchase seeds and plants, receive gardening advice, and socialise at the Seedy Cafe. The first Seedy Saturday in Qualicum Beach was organised by Joy Smith in 2002. In 2018, the event saw approximately 2700 visitors.

==== Moonlight Madness ====
Moonlight Madness is an annual event that takes place in November. The event features late-night shopping, live music, photos with Santa Claus, and carolers. The event promotes shopping local.

==== Ocean Mile Swim ====
The Ocean Mile Swim is an annual swimming event that has taken place for over 60 years. Prizes are awarded under varying categories such as fastest swimmer and youngest swimmer.

==== Fire and Ice Festival (defunct) ====
The Fire and Ice Festival was an annual event that took place each year in Qualicum Beach. The event featured, concurrently, a chili cook-off contest (the fire) and an ice sculpture contest (the ice). The event took place for 25 years, but was cancelled in 2018 due to a lack of volunteers.

=== Arts ===
==== The Old School House Arts Centre ====
The Old School House (TOSH) is an arts centre located centrally in Qualicum Beach. Originally built as a school in 1912, the school served as an elementary and secondary school until 1952. The building was then used by the Board of Education until 1985. Threatened by demolition, a group of citizens formed a non-profit cultural association to save the building. The building was restored and re-opened in February 1988 as an arts centre. The mission of TOSH Arts Centre is to "foster a vibrants arts centre that promotes and encourages the development of multi-dimensional artists and musicians for the enjoyment of all ages, residents and visitors alike, in Qualicum Beach and throughout central Vancouver Island". TOSH offers workshops, classes, and features several galleries and resident artists.

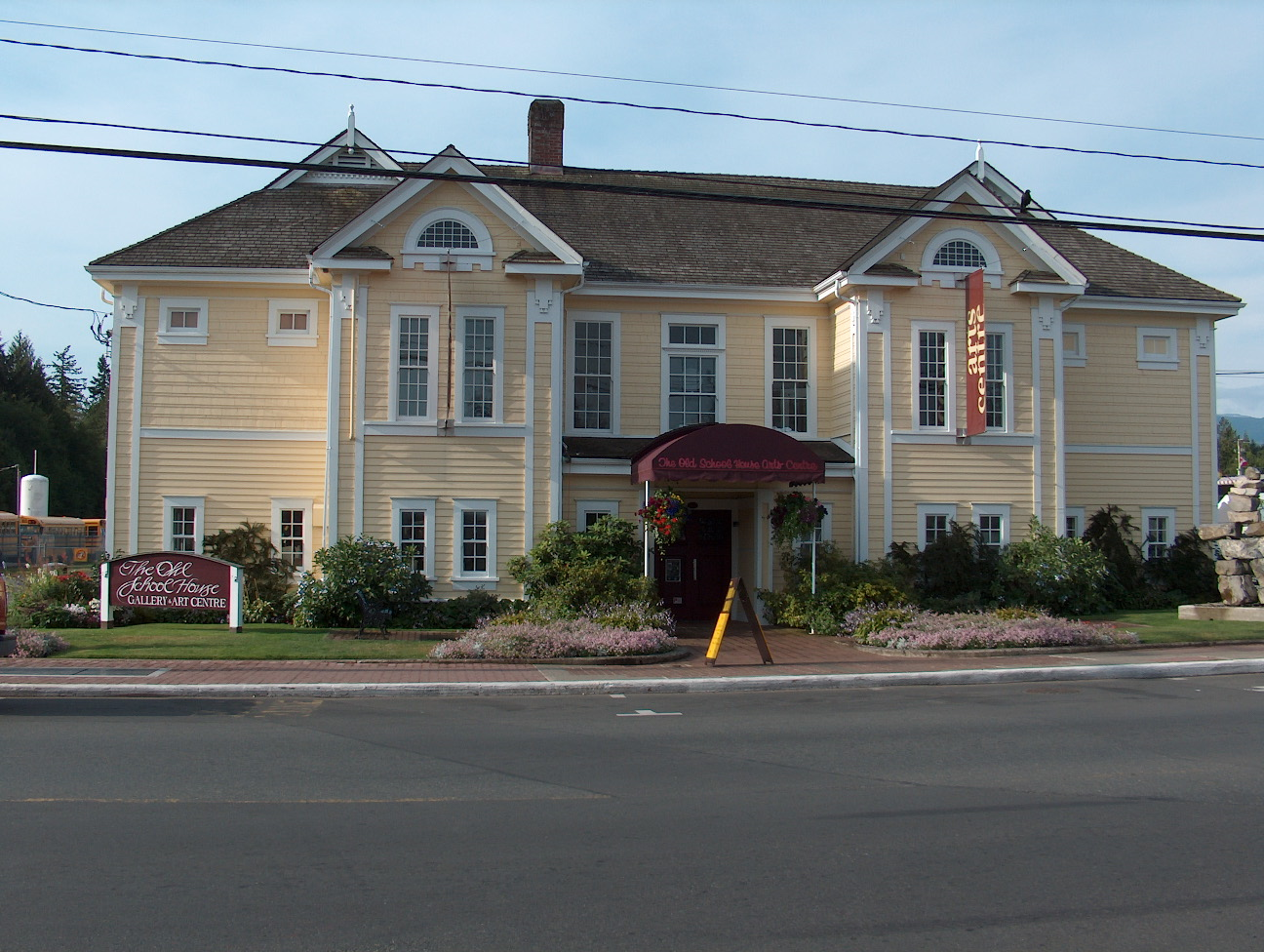
The Old School House

==== Village Theatre ====
The Village Theatre was originally built in 1948 as a movie house, but is currently used for live theatre performances. ECHO Players is a non-profit society that was founded in 1934 and has been active for over 45 years in the Village Theatre. ECHO Players is composed of more than 240 members and produces four main stage shows per season.

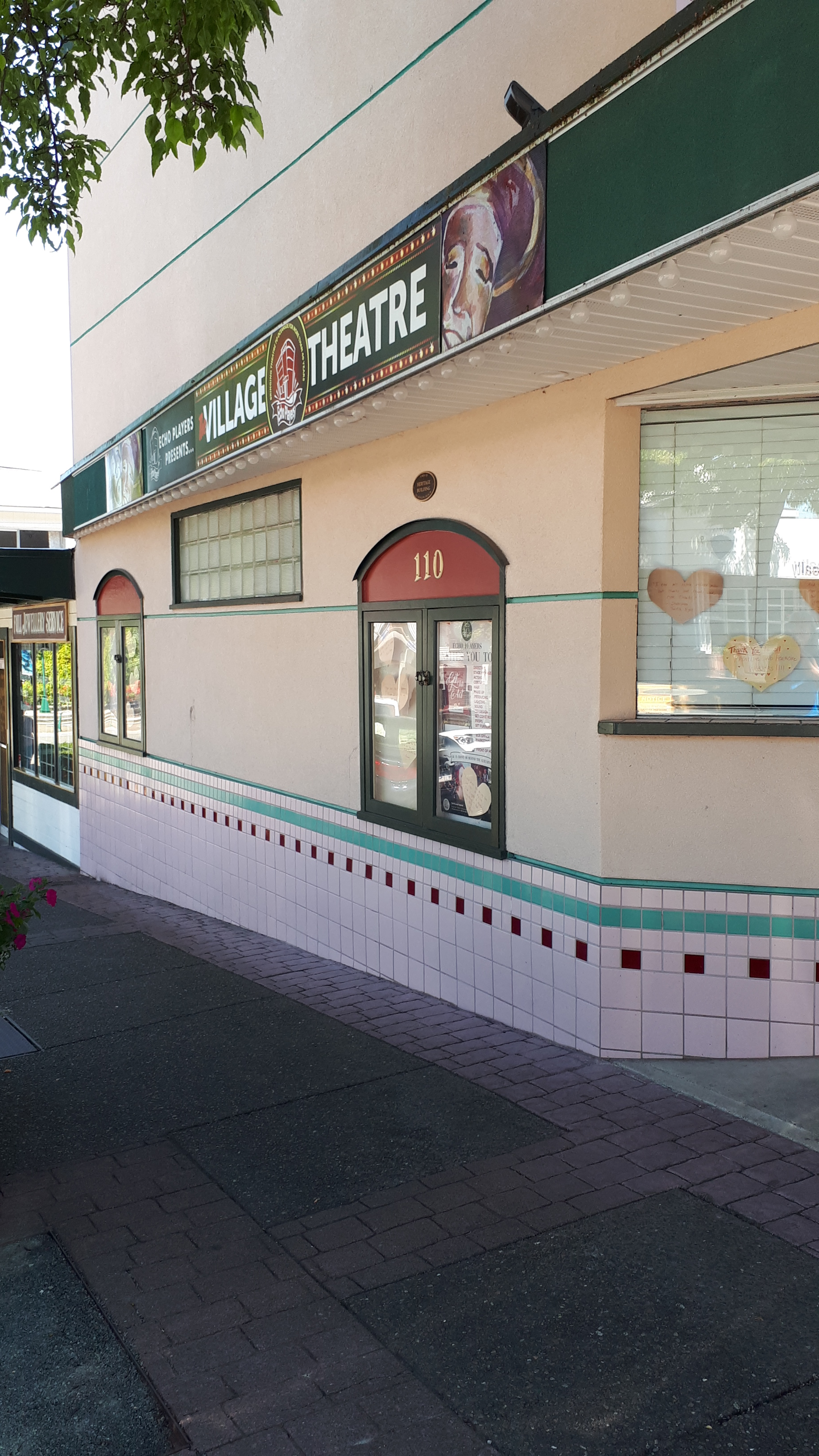
Village Theatre

=== Qualicum Beach Museum ===
The Qualicum Beach Museum was founded in 1982 by Elizabeth Little and is located in a former power generating station. The museum features both permanent as well as temporary exhibits, documenting the history of the town of Qualicum Beach.

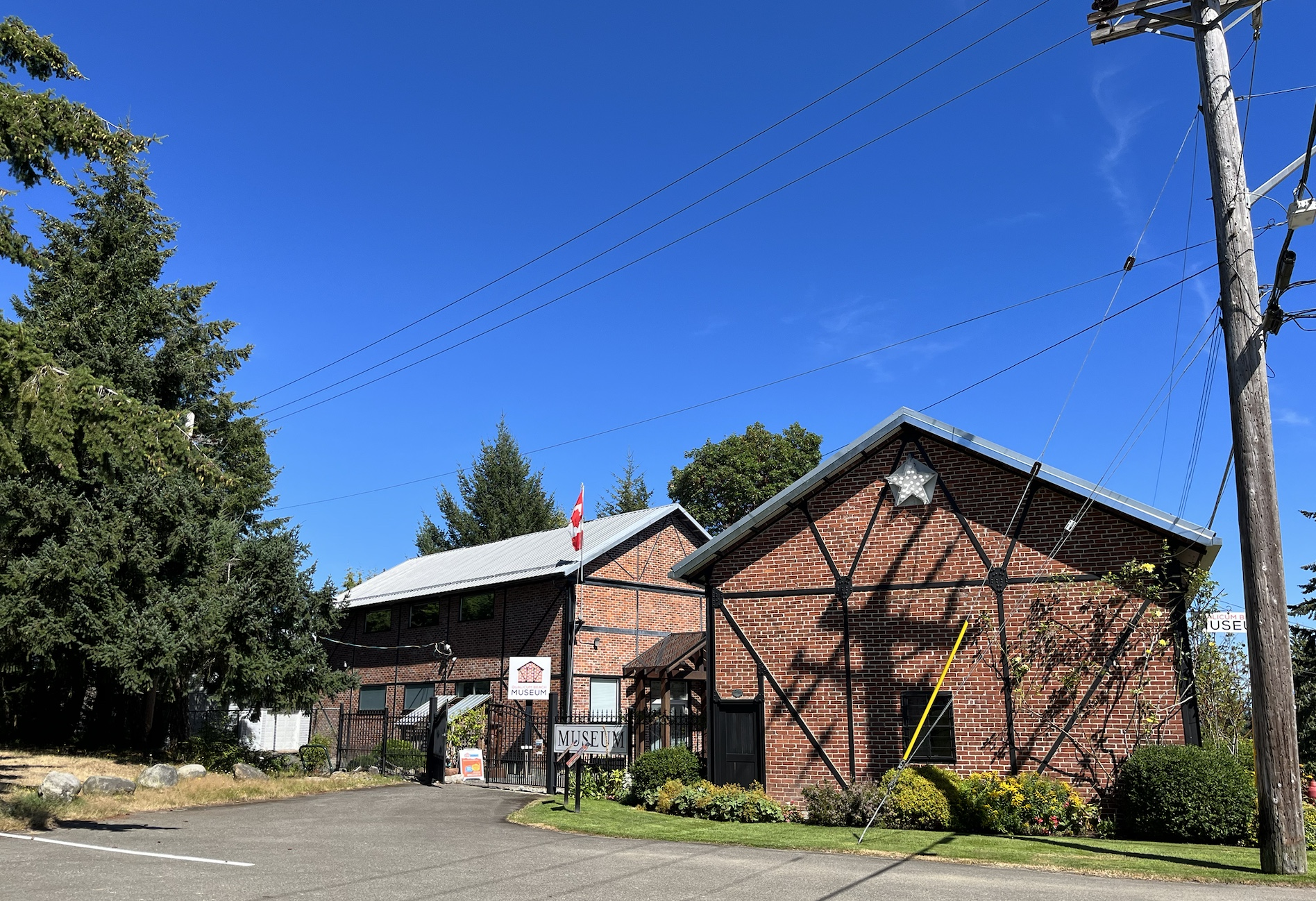
The Qualicum Beach Museum

=== Recreation and leisure ===
==== Milner Gardens ====
Milner Gardens is a 70-acre estate that was previously owned by H.R. Milner. Member of the royal family have visited twice; Prince Charles and Princess Diana visited the gardens in 1986. Prince Philip and Queen Elizabeth stayed in 1987. Vancouver Island University acquired the estate in 1996 and converted the private gardens to a public garden. The gardens feature old growth Douglas firs, cedar trees, and rare rhododendrons.

==== Memorial Golf Course ====
Memorial Golf Course is a public golf course that was opened in 1913. It is the fourth oldest golf course in British Columbia. The course is open year-round.

==== Little Qualicum Falls ====
Little Qualicum Falls is a provincial park and campground near Qualicum Beach. The falls are surrounded by old growth forests. Visitors can walk the trails, swim, and camp at this provincial park.

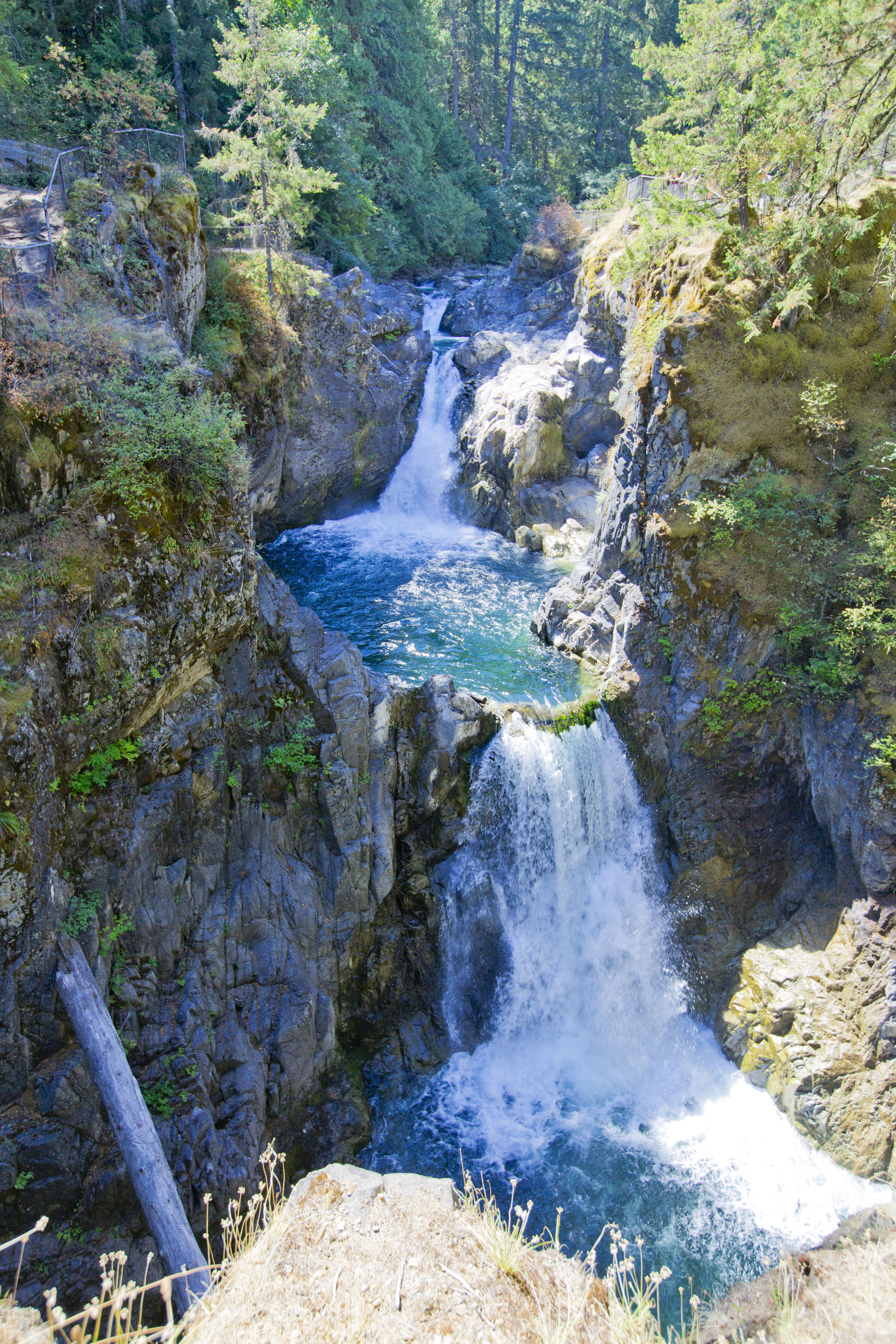
Little Qualicum Falls

==== Parks and other spaces ====
Qualicum Beach has 280 hectares (15% of the town) of Town-owned green spaces and parks:

===== Beach Front Park =====
The park is located along Island Highway 19A and is popular for walking and sunbathing. The park has picnic tables, benches, shade trees, public washrooms, a public boat ramp, and a concession stand.

===== Brant Viewing area =====
The park is located along Island Highway 19A, in the west end of Qualicum Beach. There is a viewing platform that is popular with birdwatchers and photographers. The park has picnic tables and benches.

===== Christleton Park =====
The park is located in the Qualicum Woods neighbourhood. The park has mature native trees, benches, and a children's playground.

===== Community Park =====
The park is located in the west side of downtown Qualicum Beach, by the Ravensong Aquatic Centre and the Civic Centre. The park is over 38 hectares and has a skateboard park, 7 baseball diamonds, a cricket pitch, a children's playground, a BMX track, soccer pitches, an off-leash dog park, walking trails, and public washrooms.

===== Taylor Road Trail =====
The trail is located inside Eagle Ridge Place. There are benches and a nature trail.

===== General Money Park =====
The park is located between Harlech Road and Sunningdale Road West. The Qualicum Beach Train Station is located within the park, as well as a church and steam locomotive. There are benches, flower gardens, a community garden, and fruit trees.

===== Glassford Square =====
The square is located centrally in the town, next to the Public Library and Town Hall. The square features an artisan sculpted marble fountain, benches, and an information kiosk.

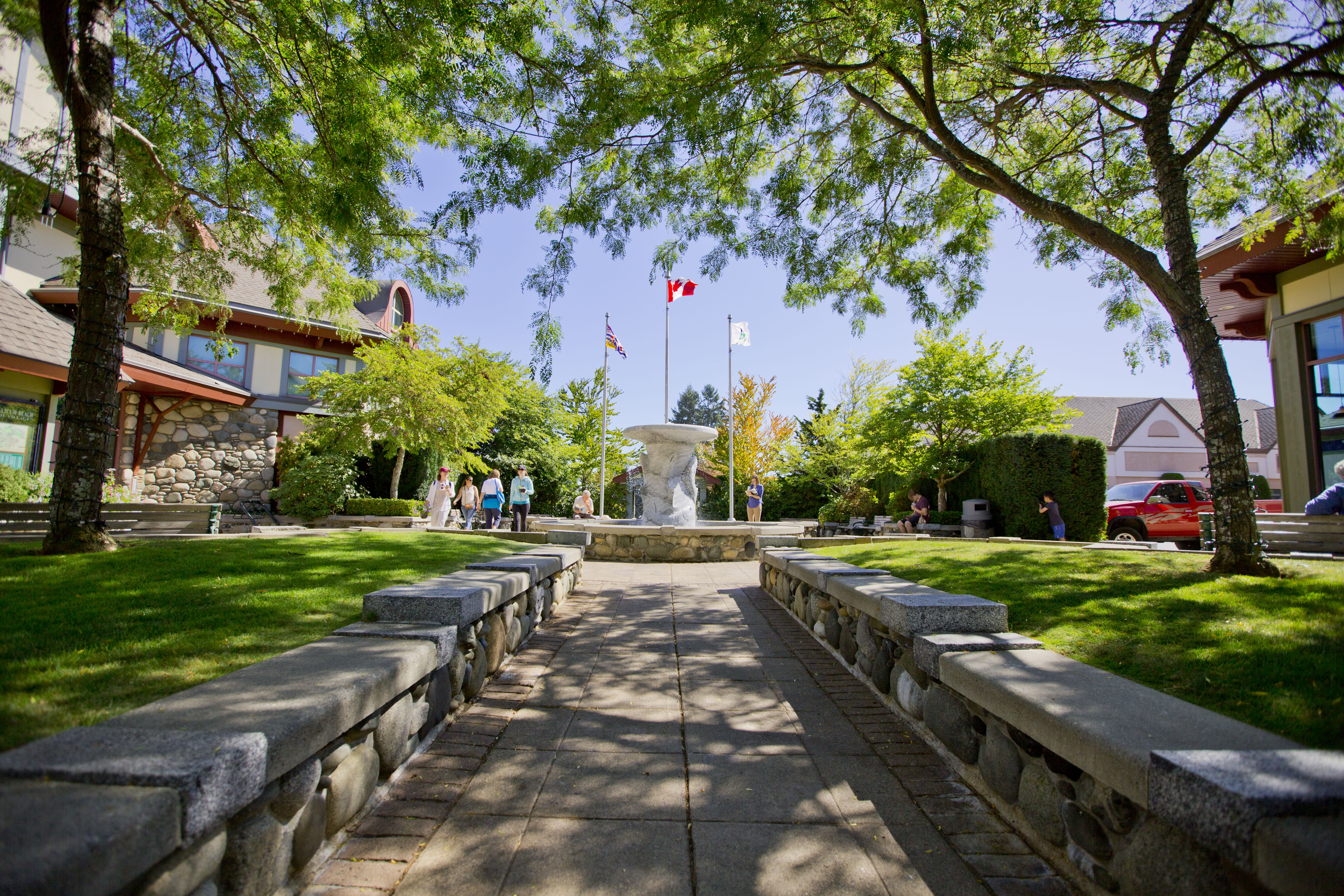
Glassford Square

===== Grandon Creek =====
The park is located in the west part of Qualicum Beach. The park is heavily forested and features a ravine with fish ladders. There are nature trails and benches. The Qualicum Beach Streamkeepers count smolt annually in Grandon Creek and work to improve the habitat.

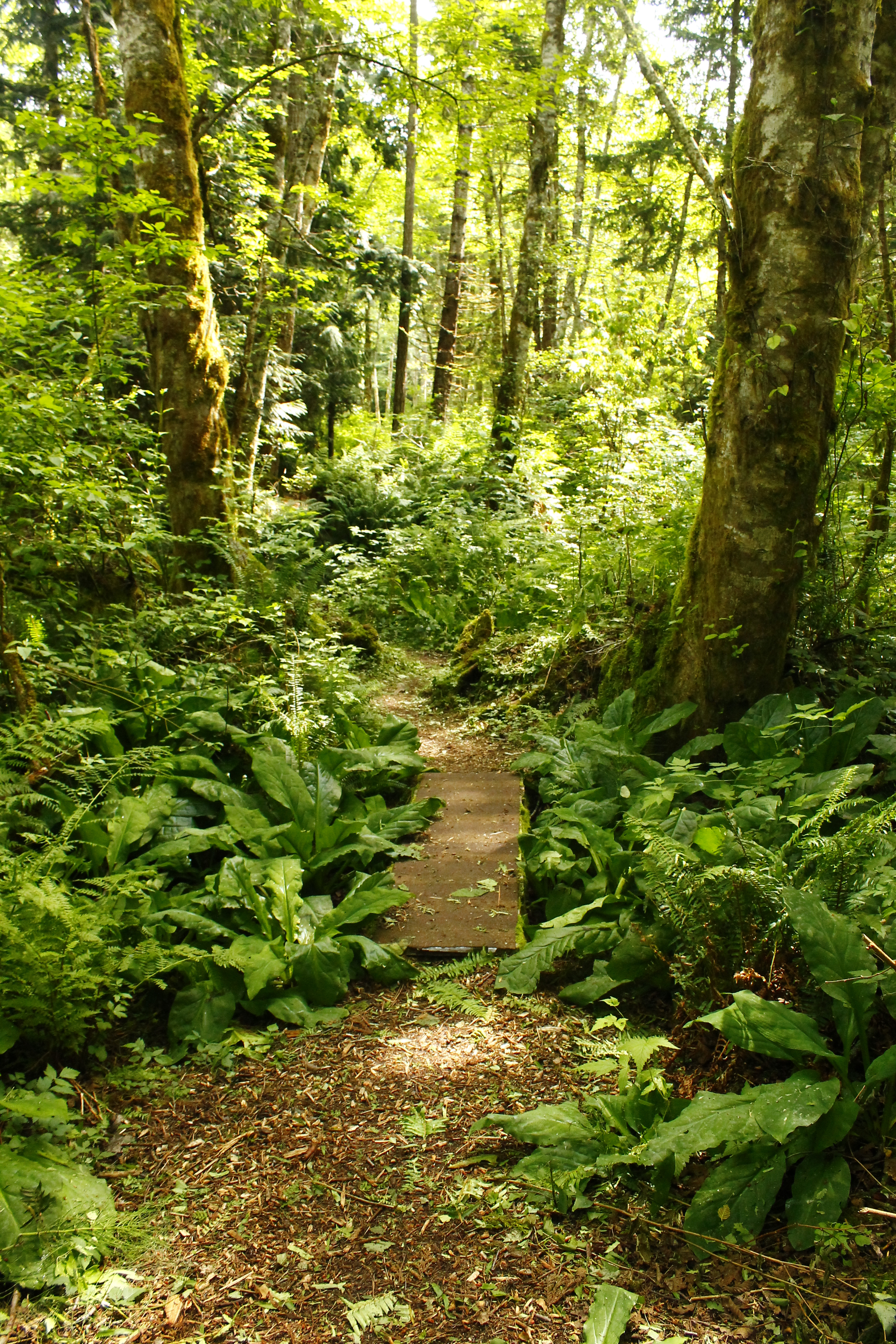
Grandon Creek

===== Heritage Forest =====
Heritage Forest is a 50-acre forest in Qualicum Beach that features pockets of old growth coastal Douglas fir, western red cedar, grand fir, Sitka spruce, and hemlock. Heritage Forest is situated within the Coastal Douglas fir biogeoclimatic zone. This zone is the most biologically diverse forest type in British Columbia. The land was previously owned by General Noel Money and later the Brown Family Trust.

In 1996, plans were in place to subdivide the land into 110 building lots. Anne and Leo Klees and others formed the Brown Property Preservation Society to raise funds to purchase the land and save it from development. In 2004, the group was able to purchase the forest with help from the town of Qualicum Beach. The Heritage Forest represents 20% of all coastal Douglas fir protected forest in British Columbia.

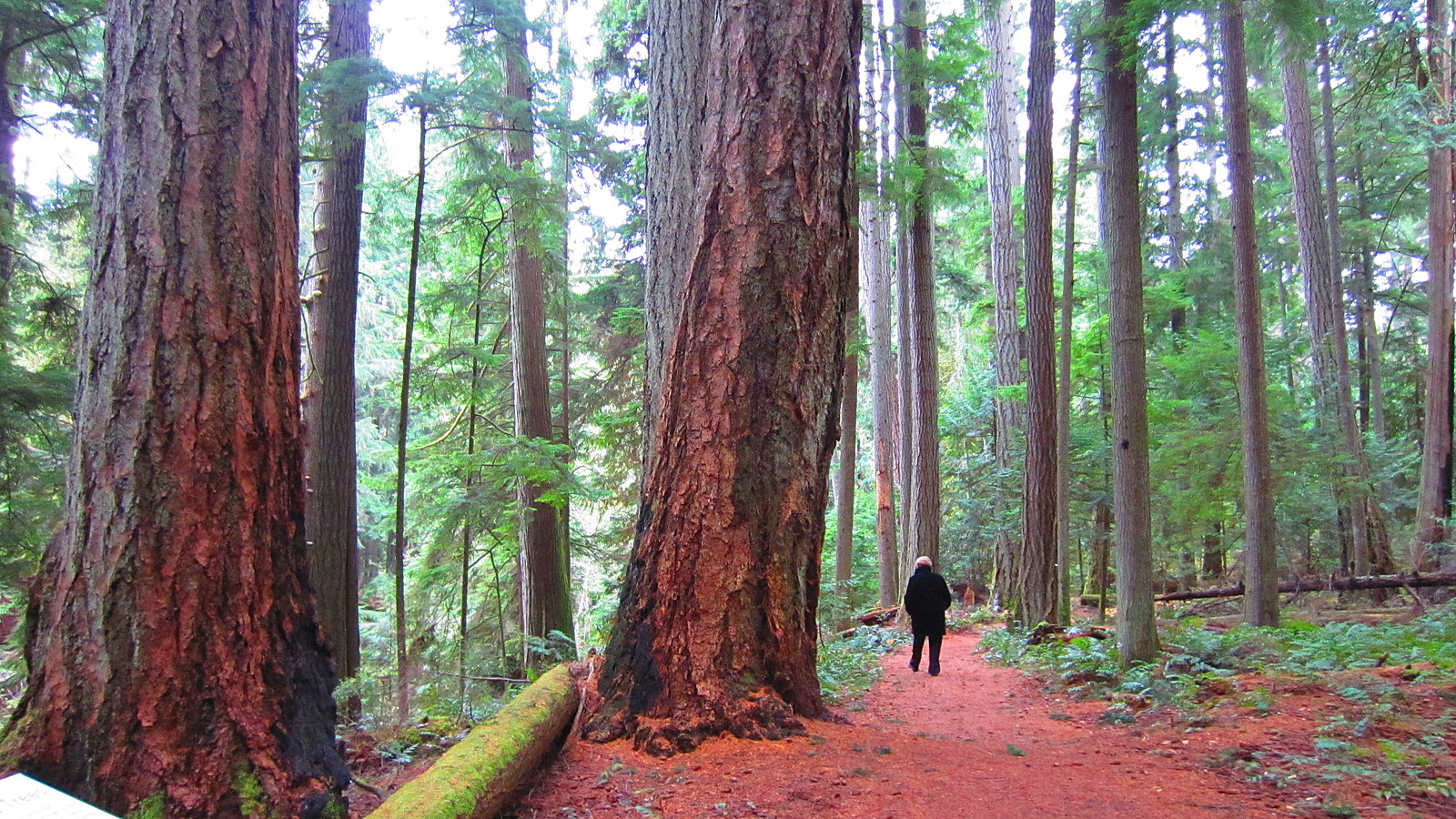
Heritage Forest

===== Jubilee Park =====
The park is located on Island Highway 19A, along the waterfront. The park features benches and picnic tables.

===== Miraloma Park =====
The park is located on Bennett Road. The park is a third of a hectare and features nature trails.

===== Seacrest Park =====
The park is located on Seacrest Place. It functions as a beach access and has benches.

===== Spirit Square =====
The square is located on Memorial Avenue. The square is next to the Community Hall and has sitting areas. The square is often used for events.

===== Yambury Park =====
The park is located on Yambury Road. The park is partially forested and has nature trails. It is a popular spot for dog walking.

== Heritage sites ==
Qualicum Beach has a number of places on the Canadian Register of Historic Places.

List of Historic Places in Qualicum Beach
Name of Heritage Site	Date Constructed	Location
Kinkade Farmstead	1882 to 1884	3567 Island Highway West, Qualicum Beach
Qualicum Beach Train Station	1914	600 Beach Road
Qualicum Beach Community Hall	1933	644 Memorial Avenue, Qualicum Beach
The Old School House [TOSH]	1914	122 Fern Road West, Qualicum Beach
Crown Mansion	1914	292 Crescent Road East, Qualicum Beach
Village Theatre	1948	110 2nd Avenue West, Qualicum Beach
Thrall Residence	1915	124 2nd Avenue West, Qualicum Beach
Qualicum Beach Museum	1930	587 Beach Road, Qualicum Beach
The White House	1913	210 Crescent Road West, Qualicum Beach
St. Mark's Anglican Church	1926	138 Hoylake Road West, Qualicum Beach
Burnham Road Residence	1920s	394 Burnham Road, Qualicum Beach

== Landmarks ==
Site	Location	Remarks
Qualicum College	49.357494°N 124.426968°W	Built in 1935
Public Library and Town Hall Tower	49.347948°N 124.444027°W	Can be seen from around town.
Site of former Eaglecrest Lodge	49.357935°N 124.402506°W	Built by General MacRae.
Heritage Forest	49.35205°N 124.432°W	Brown Property Preservation Society.
Kwalikum Secondary School	49.348444°N 124.433641°W	
Qualicum Beach Airport	49°20′14″N 124°23′38″W	
E and N Railway station	49.349559°N 124.446784°W	

== Image gallery ==
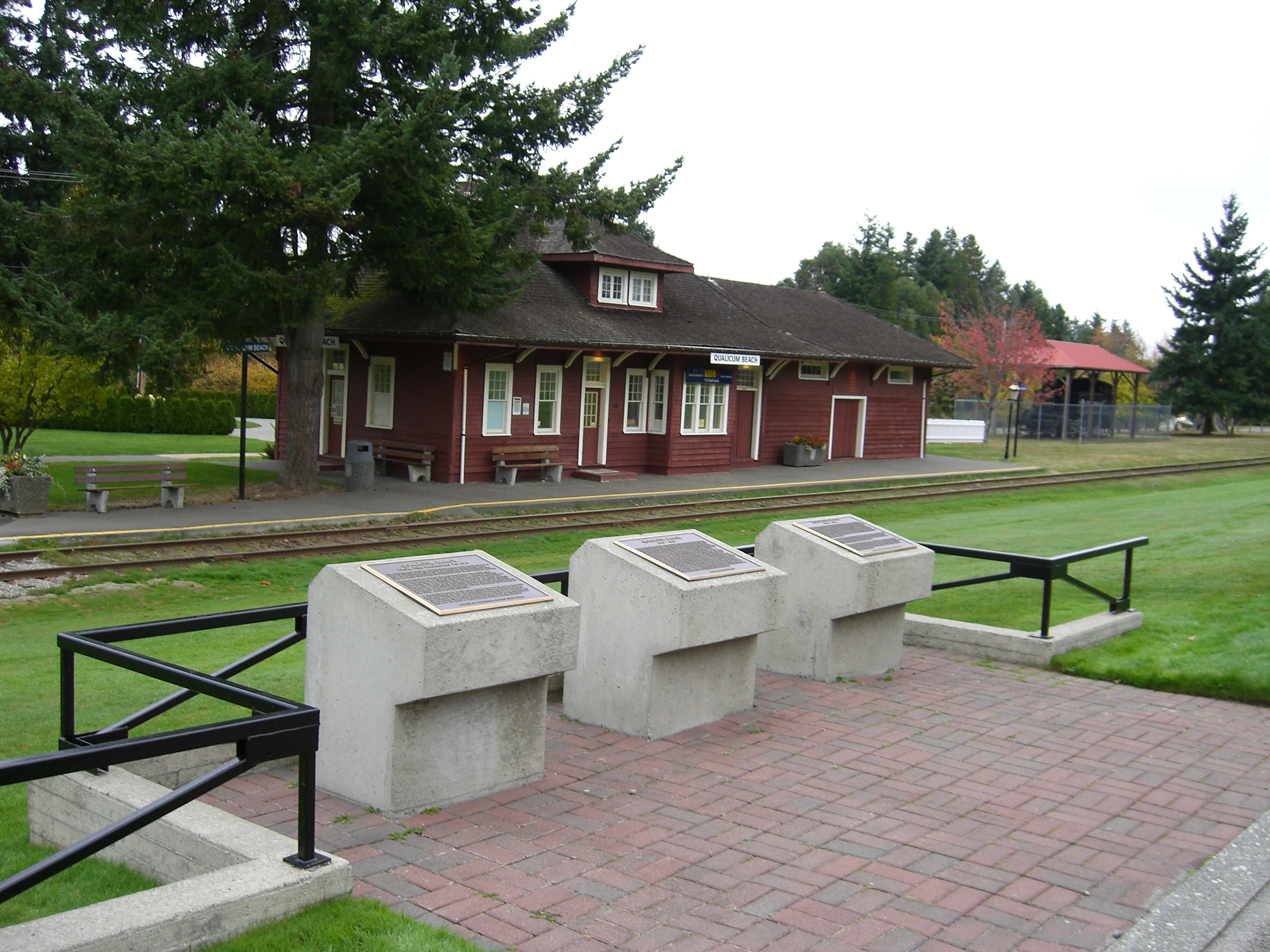
1992 History Monuments, 50th anniversary of Qualicum Beach

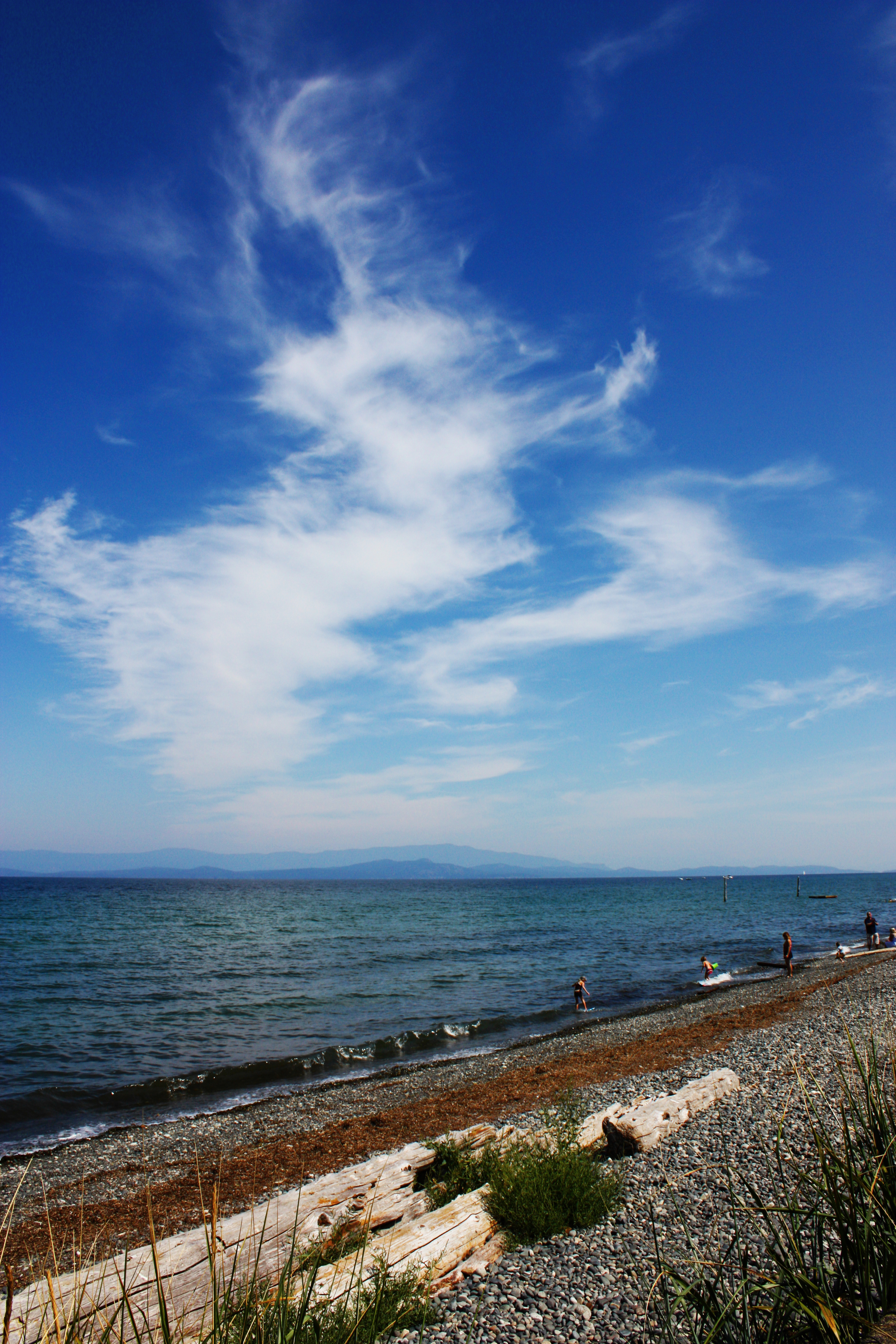
Qualicum Beach

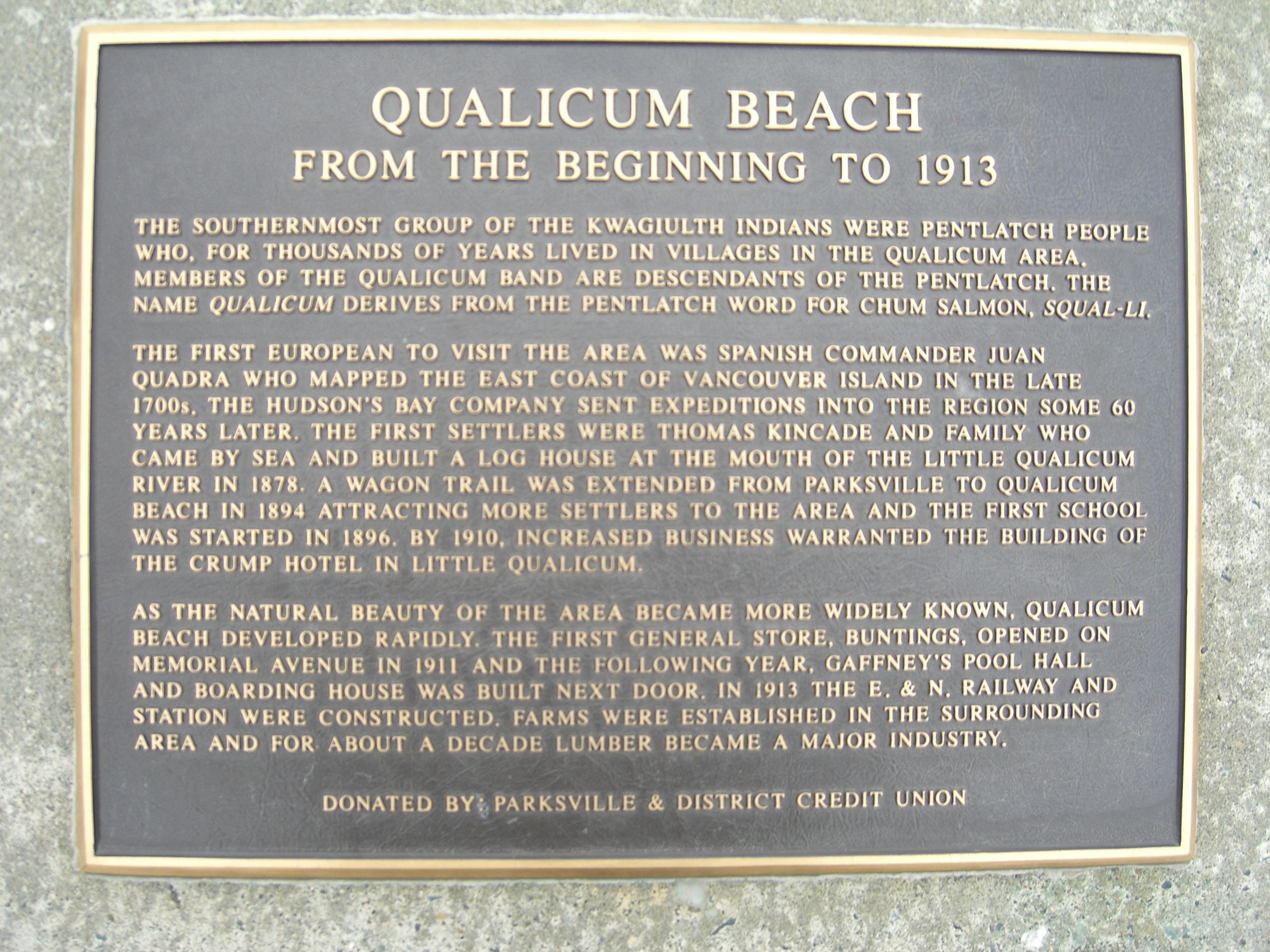
From the beginning to 1913

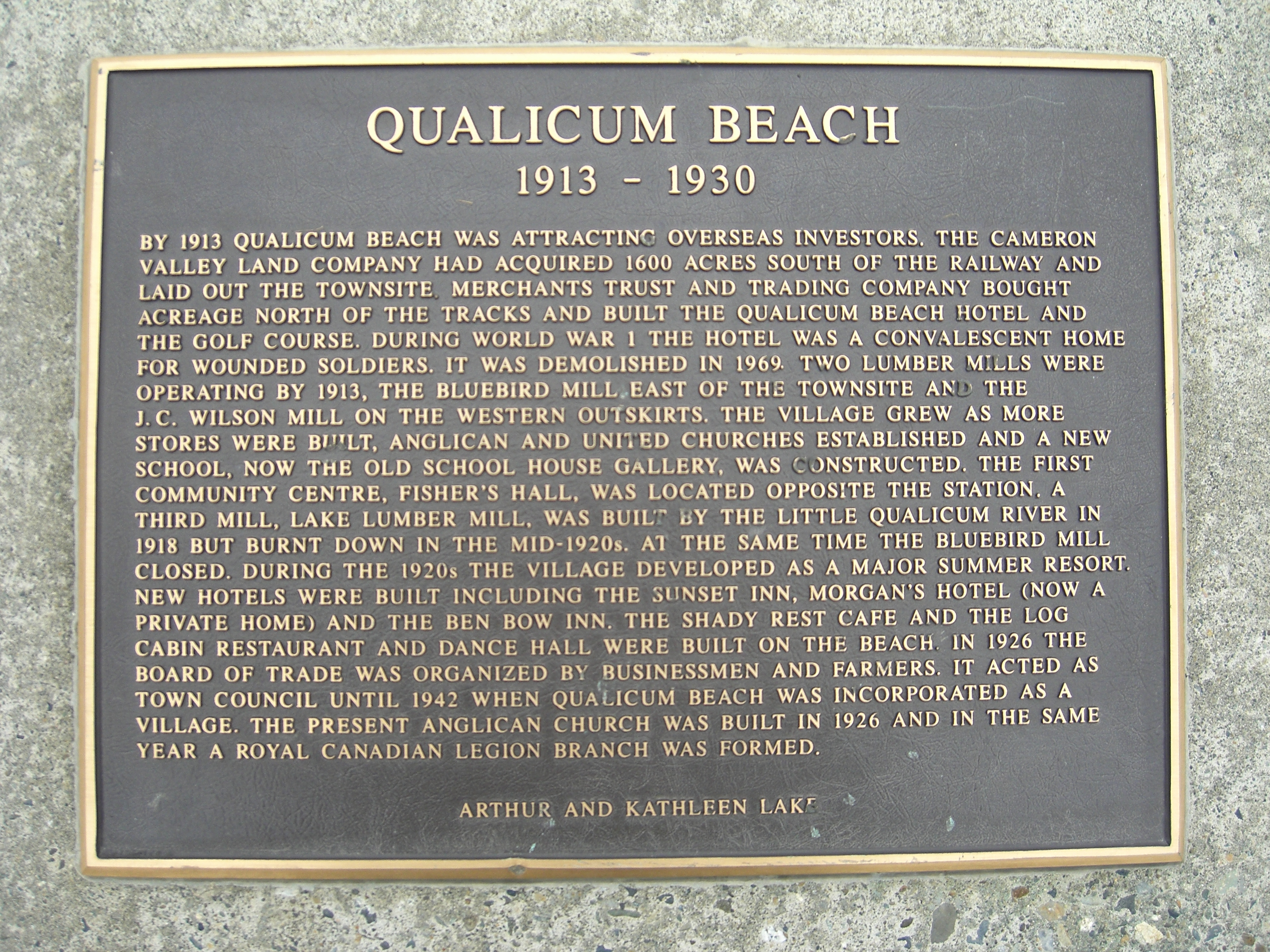
From 1913 to 1930

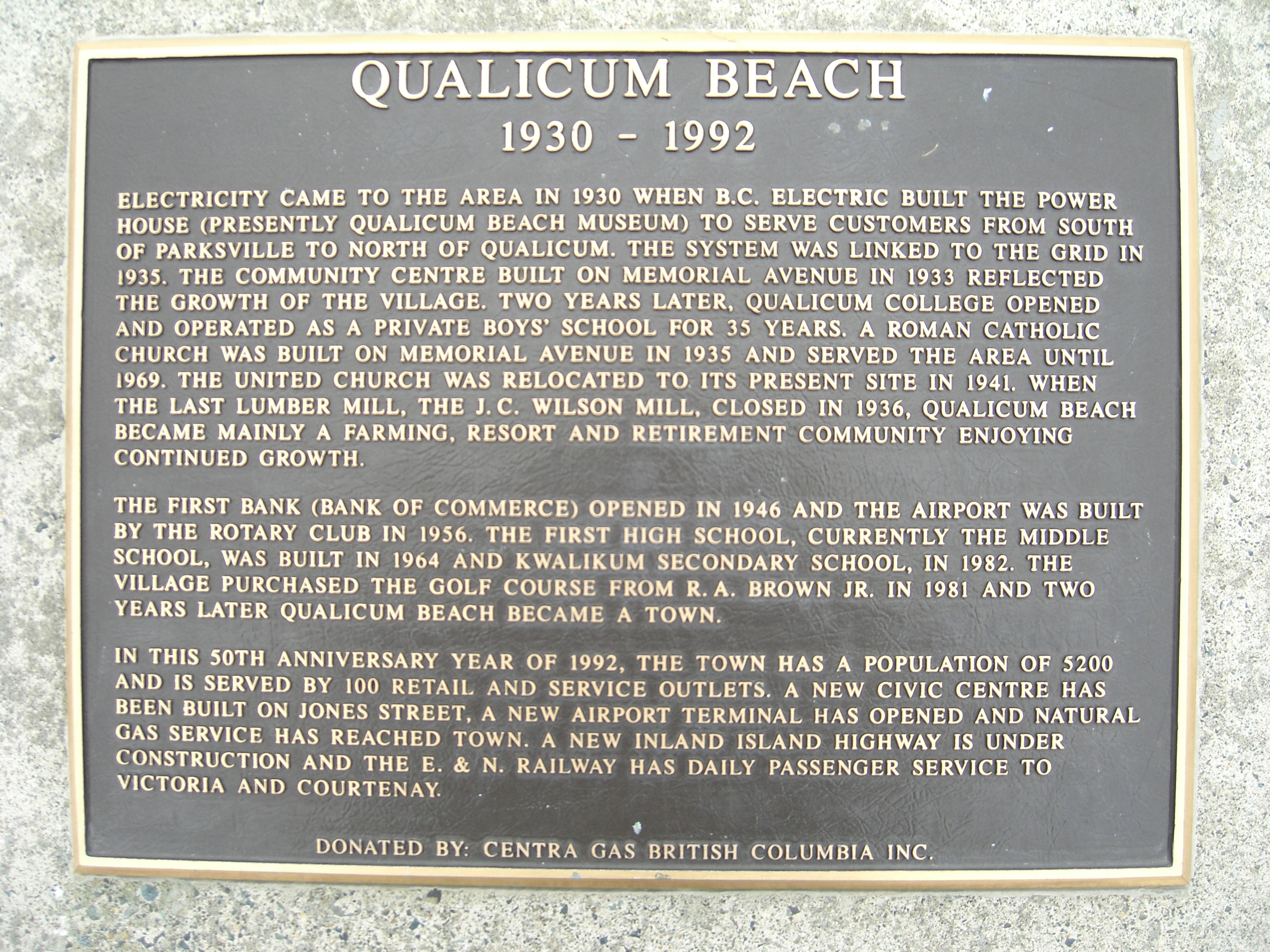
From 1930 to 1992

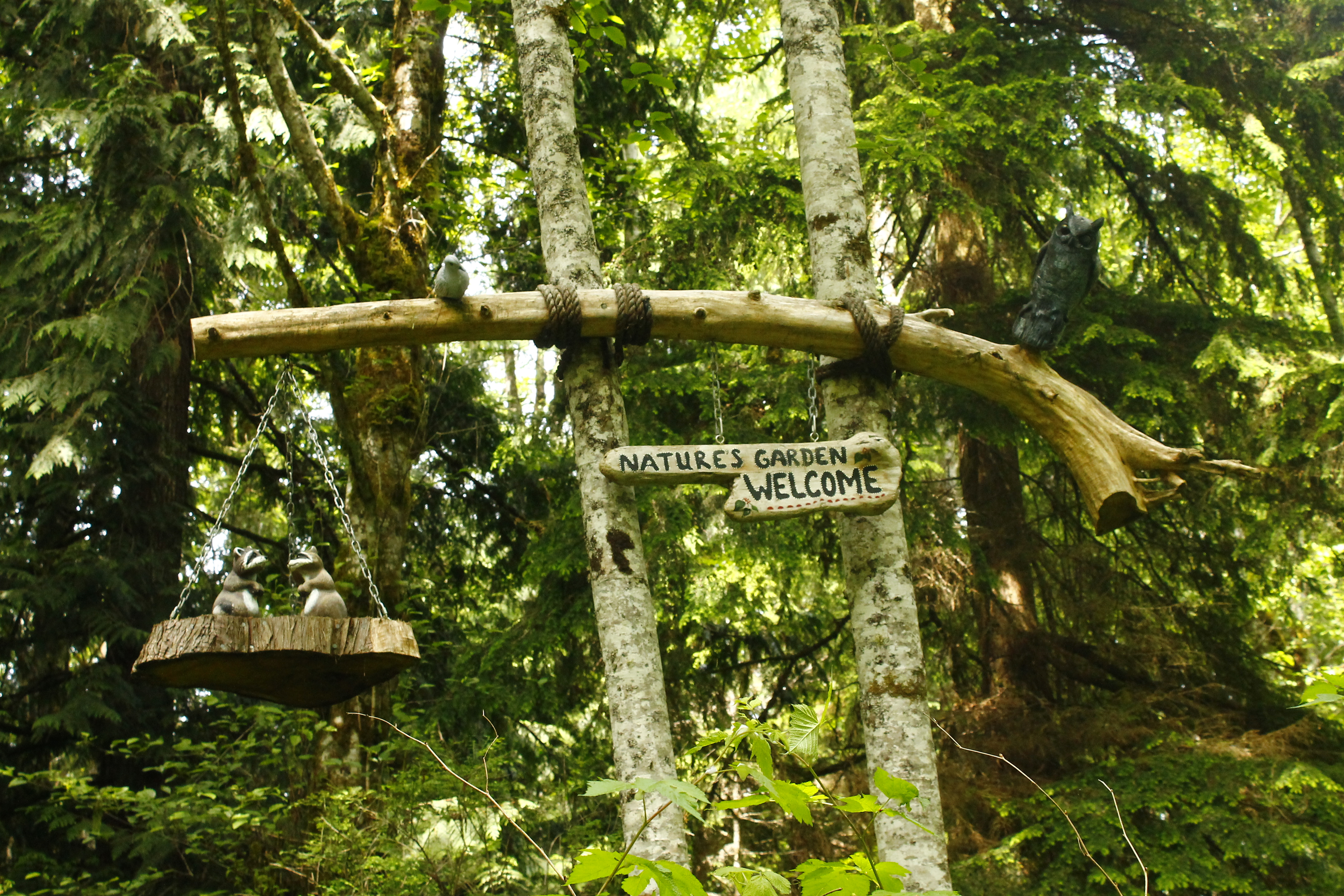
Grandon Creek trail

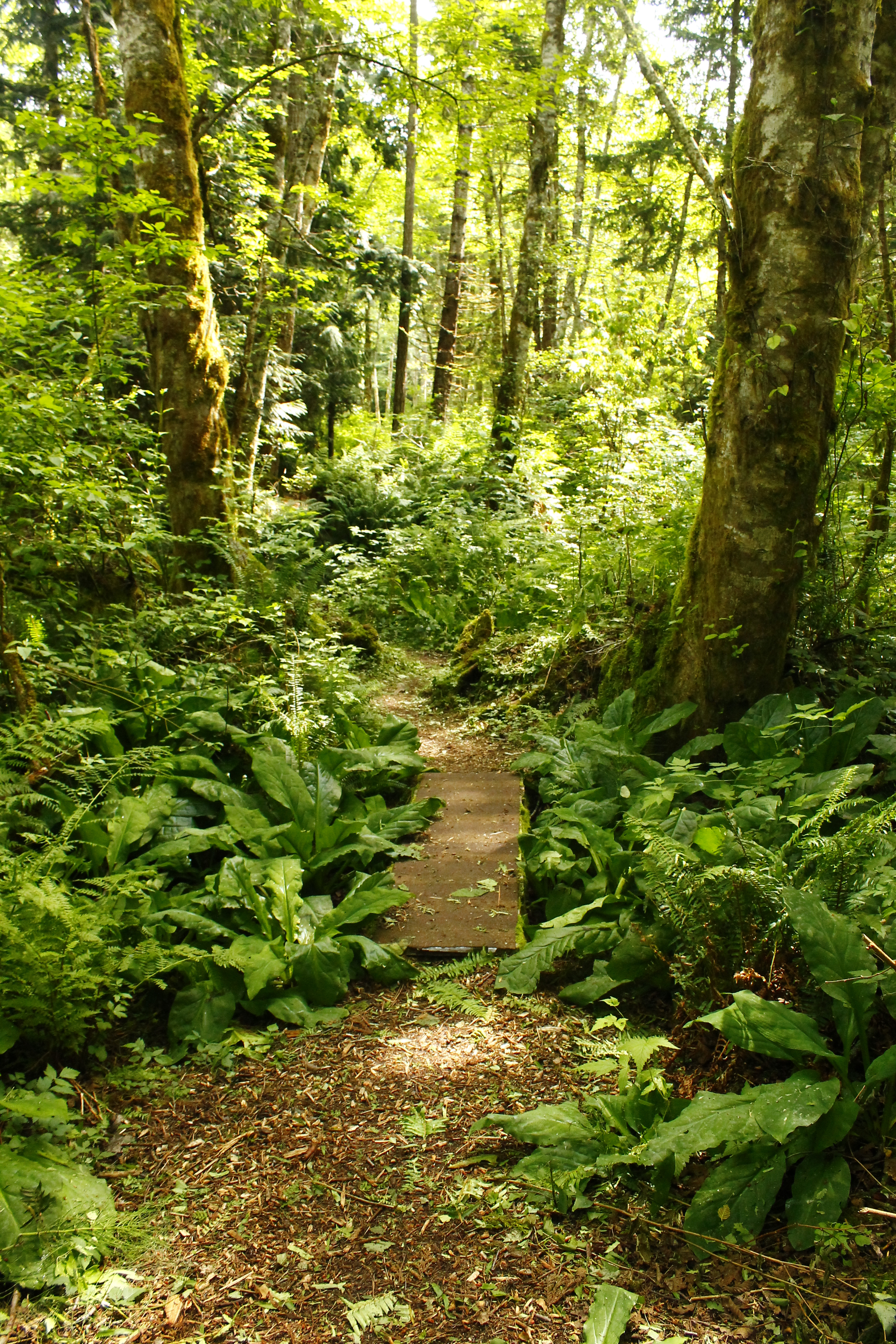
Grandon Creek trail

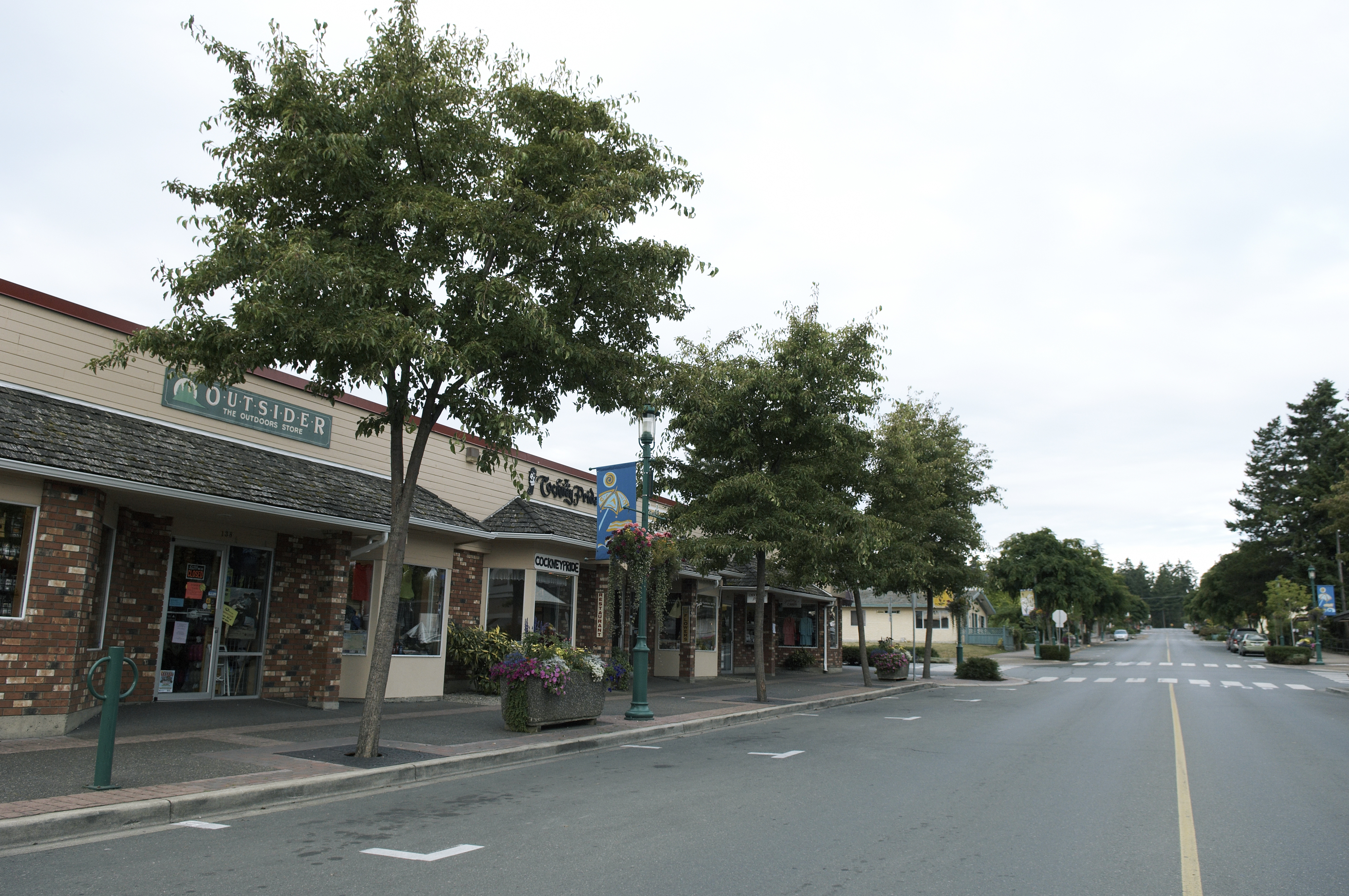
Second Avenue

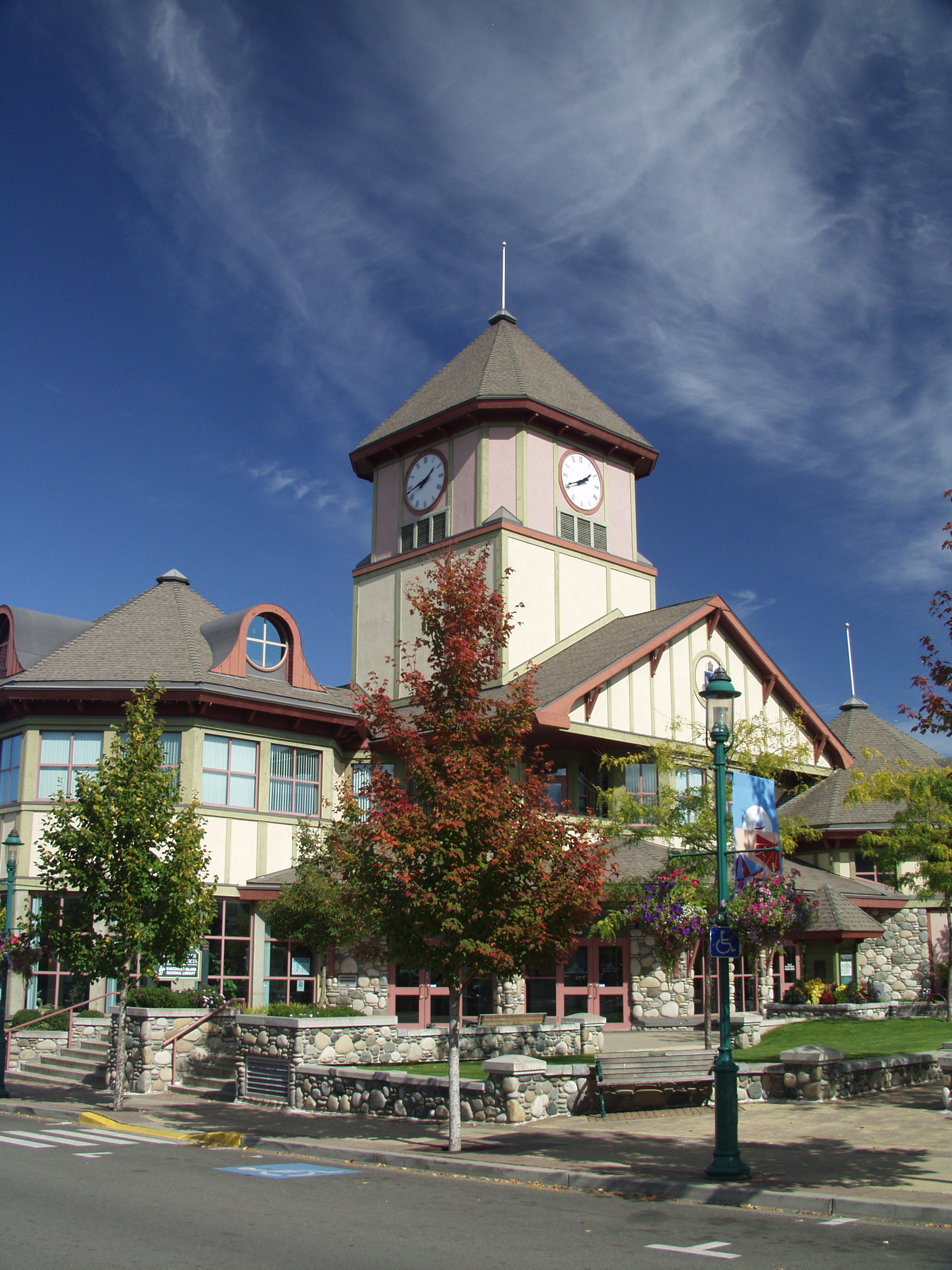
Town Hall and the Library

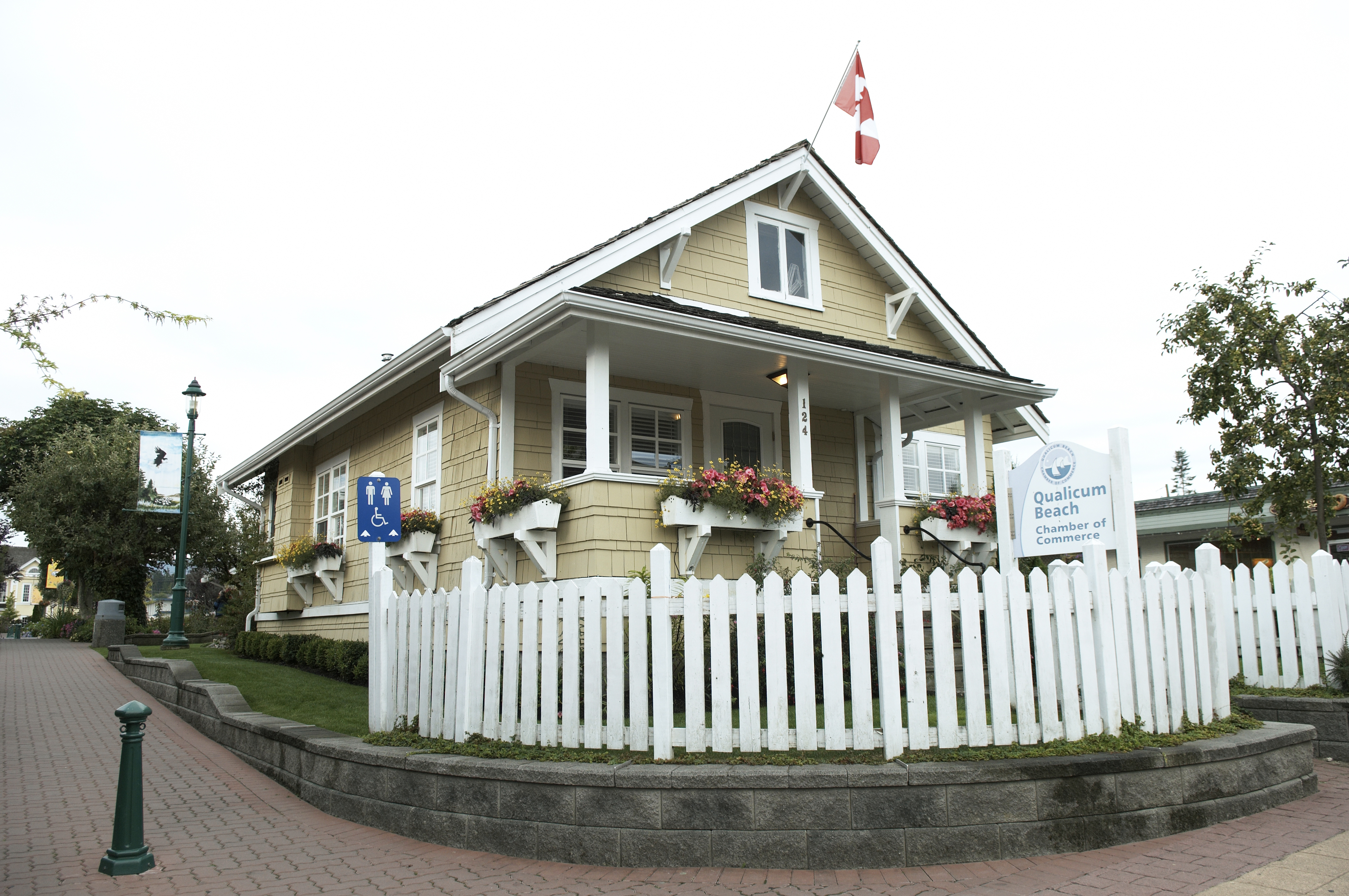
The Thrall Residence

== In popular culture ==
The Hallmark TV series Chesapeake Shores was primarily filmed in Qualicum Beach. The Thrall Residence (also known as the Leigh House) was used as Sally's Café, a frequent filming location throughout the series.

== Notable people ==
- Noel Ernest Money, a British Canadian brigadier-general.
- Coral Eswyn (née Ellinor) Lyster, a British Canadian war bride author who lived in Qualicum Beach.
- Alexander Duncan McRae, a Canadian Politician.
- Horatio Ray Milner, Canadian lawyer and businessman.
- Herbert John Welch, former mayor and politician.
- Harrison Houde, Canadian singer and actor.

== Other ==
=== Freedom of the Town ===
The following people and military units have received the Freedom of the Town of Qualicum Beach.

==== People ====
- Margaret Little in 1998
- James Robert Storey in 2006
- Anna Maria Klees in 2011
- Arthur Norman Skipsey in 2011
- John E. Collins in 2011
- Leo Klees in 2011

==== Military Units ====
- 19 Mission Support Squadron, RCAF: May 7, 2022.

HMS Qualicum was a ship in the Royal Navy named for the community.

=== Serval Escape ===
On October 2, 2022, a pair of Servals escaped from a private residence in Qualicum Beach. A neighbour's pet cat was killed by one of the escaped servals. The first serval was found on October 3, while the second roamed free, killing several ducks, until it was captured on October 9. The incident, among others, prompted the BC SPCA to request a provincial ban on serval cats as pets.

=== Town Crier ===
Qualicum Beach is the only town on Vancouver Island that still has a town crier. Since 2026, Jim Purdon is the town's official town crier, with Mike Garland serving as alternate. From 1999 until 2025, the town's official Town crier was Leonard Mustard.

== See also ==
- General A.D. McRae, who built Eaglecrest.
- Little Qualicum Falls Provincial Park.
- Horne Lake Caves Provincial Park.
- Parksville, British Columbia.
- MacMillan Provincial Park Cathedral Grove
- Qualicum First Nation
- Eswyn Lyster – warbride author
- Englishman River Falls Provincial Park
- Noel Money
