= Results of the 1996 British Columbia general election by riding =

British Columbia election results

The following are the results by riding (electoral district) of the 1996 British Columbia general election held on May 28, 1996.

== Results by riding ==
Electoral district	Candidates						Incumbent
Electoral district	NDP	Liberal	Reform	PDA	Green	Other	Incumbent
Abbotsford	Bruce Temple; 5,405 – 24.69%	John van Dongen; 10,998 – 50.24%	Mark Warawa; 4,086 – 18.67%	Merilyn Anderson; 1,125 – 5.14%	Geoff Berner; 274 – 1.25%		John van Dongen
Alberni	Gerard A. M. Janssen; 7,398 – 52.01%	Gillian Trumper; 5,099 – 35.85%	Vi Hiansen; 823 – 5.79%	Ingrid Helen Rebar; 578 – 4.06%	Andre Sperling; 195 – 1.37%	Karl Angus (Common Sense) 72 – 0.51%; Kathleen Lapeyrouse (NLP) 58 – 0.41%	Gerard A. M. Janssen
Bulkley Valley-Stikine	Bill Goodacre; 4,779 – 37.02%	Pat Beach; 3,726 – 28.87%	Bill Zemenchik; 3,473 – 26.91%	Sharon L. Hartwell; 624 – 4.83%	Stuart Hertzog; 151 – 1.17%	Peter Barendregt (SC); 155 – 1.20%	Jackie Pement
Burnaby-Edmonds	Fred Randall; 9,912 – 46.45%	Judy St. Denis; 8,770 – 41.09%	Carlos Brito; 1,008 – 4.72%	John Schwermer; 1,067 – 5.00%	Eric Hawthorne; 387 – 1.81%		Fred Randall
Burnaby North	Pietro Calendino; 8,926 – 45.47%	Richard T. Lee; 8,160 – 41.57%	Daniela Bosa; 1,081 – 5.51%	Richard A. Y. Lee; 976 – 4.97%	Tom Hetherington; 395 – 2.01%	Derek Nadeau (NLP) 62 – 0.32%; Carlo Nigro (Ltn.) 31 – 0.16%	Barry Jones
Burnaby-Willingdon	Joan Sawicki; 10,501 – 45.54%	John Nuraney; 9,678 – 41.97%	Sunny G. Sodhi; 999 – 4.33%	Thomas Reekie; 1,161 – 5.03%	Joe Keithley; 458 – 1.99%	Peter B. MacDonald (Cons.) 190 – 0.82%; Henriette Toth (NLP) 74 – 0.32%	Joan Sawicki
Cariboo North	Frank Garden; 5,180 – 38.26%	John D. Wilson; 5,533 – 40.87%	Robert Eyford; 2,561 – 18.92%		Phillip Mencero; 168 – 1.24%	Ric Steines (Ltn.); 97 – 0.72%	Frank Garden
Cariboo South	David Zirnhelt; 6,372 – 41.45%	Dave Worthy; 6,050 – 39.35%	Jon Wolbers; 2,684 – 17.46%		Donald Stuart Rennie; 267 – 1.74%		David Zirnhelt
Chilliwack	Rollie Keith; 5,989 – 24.48%	Barry Penner; 9,273 – 37.90%	Bill Wimpney; 3,237 – 13.23%		Steve Kisbey; 232 – 0.95%	Bob Chisholm; 5,736 – 23.44%	Bob Chisholm
Columbia River-Revelstoke	Jim Doyle; 6,264 – 42.52%	Brian Allan McMahon; 5,172 – 35.10%	Steve V. Pinchak; 2,687 – 18.24%	Dave Herman; 282 – 1.91%	Rhonda Smith; 270 – 1.83%	Sonia Stairs (NLP); 58 – 0.39%	Jim Doyle
Comox Valley	Evelyn Gillespie; 13,230 – 42.76%	Bill MacDonald; 10,721 – 34.65%	Delbert Doll; 3,451 – 11.15%	Joe Lawlor; 1,039 – 3.36%	Meaghan Cursons; 1,296 – 4.19%	Alicia Burns 598 – 1.93%; John Krell (FCP) 398 – 1.29%; Angus Ramsey 149 – 0.48%; Hillel Alan Wright 57 – 0.18%	Margaret Lord
Coquitlam-Maillardville	John Cashore; 10,812 – 45.91%	Maxine Wilson; 9,440 – 40.08%	Bev Walsh; 1,434 – 6.09%	Angela Broughton; 1,289 – 5.47%		Rob Gillespie (Ltn.) 224 – 0.95%; Dave Gallagher (SC) 133 – 0.56%; Richard Van Schaik (NLP) 123 – 0.52%; Debra Hicks (Cons.) 96 – 0.41%	John Cashore
Cowichan-Ladysmith	Jan Pullinger; 12,249 – 49.85%	Ray Smith; 7,783 – 31.68%	Tom Walker; 2,434 – 9.91%	Perry James Johnson; 1,459 – 5.94%	Julian West; 645 – 2.63%		Jan Pullinger
Delta North	Norm Lortie; 8,657 – 42.33%	Reni Masi; 9,305 – 45.50%	Gurmant Grewal; 755 – 3.69%	Ross Pike; 1,385 – 6.77%	Angela Chiotakos; 347 – 1.70%		Norm Lortie
Delta South	Lloyd MacDonald; 5,984 – 26.22%	Fred Gingell; 13,415 – 58.78%	Kevin Garvey; 1,371 – 6.01%	Donna M. Tobias; 1,215 – 5.32%	Greg Dickey; 333 – 1.46%	Jim Hessels (FCP) 304 – 1.33%; Fabian Milat (SC) 200 – 0.88%	Fred Gingell
Esquimalt-Metchosin	Moe Sihota; 13,833 – 59.54%	Heather Landon; 6,770 – 29.14%	Scotty Davidson; 1,179 – 5.07%	Ron Whims; 921 – 3.96%	Adam Charlesworth; 376 – 1.62%	Sylvia Danyluk (NLP) 60 – 0.26%; David M. Shebib 58 – 0.25%; Bob O'Neill (Communist) 35 – 0.15%	Moe Sihota
Fort Langley-Aldergrove	Charles Bradford; 7,369 – 29.03%	Rich Coleman; 12,005 – 47.30%	John Twidale; 3,484 – 13.73%	Bob Farquhar; 1,737 – 6.84%	Amy Salmon; 472 – 1.86%	Lila O. Stanford (FCP); 316 – 1.24%	Gary Farrell-Collins
Kamloops	Cathy McGregor; 10,135 – 44.30%	Gur Singh; 9,273 – 40.53%	Joe Leong; 1,721 – 7.52%	Deborah J. Fisher; 1,241 – 5.42%		Ken Endean (SC); 508 – 2.22%	Arthur L. Charbonneau
Kamloops-North Thompson	Fred Jackson; 6,945 – 41.25%	Kevin Krueger; 7,313 – 43.43%	Alan Forseth; 1,710 – 10.16%		Alan Child; 401 – 2.38%	Steve Quinn (SC); 468 – 2.78%	Fred Jackson
Kootenay	Erda Walsh; 6,398 – 38.59%	Ron Tarr; 5,887 – 35.50%	Wilf Hanni; 3,718 – 22.42%		Casey Brennan; 363 – 2.19%	Marko Makar; 215 – 1.30%	Anne Edwards
Langley	Kim Richter; 5,795 – 29.12%	Lynn Stephens; 9,277 – 46.62%	Joe Lopushinsky; 3,224 – 16.20%	Paul MacDonald; 1,195 – 6.00%	Fely Gotia-Walters; 262 – 1.32%	Ian B. Thompson (SC); 148 – 0.74%	Lynn Stephens
Malahat-Juan de Fuca	Rick Kasper; 10,686-48.63%	Mike Elcock; 7,556 – 34.39%	Bill Cools; 1,887 – 8.59%	Donna Launay; 1,061 – 4.83%	Beverley Holden; 601 – 2.74%	Louis James Lesosky 98 – 0.45%; Dode French (WCC) 84 – 0.38%	Rick Kasper
Maple Ridge-Pitt Meadows	Bill Hartley; 12,946 – 46.07%	Ken Stewart; 10,960 – 39.00%	Nick Walsh; 1,470 – 5.23%	Peter Neufeld; 2,011 – 7.16%	Richard Hennick; 464 – 1.65%	Lewis Clarke Dahlby (Ltn.) 158 – 0.56%; Matt Deacon (NLP) 90 – 0.32%	Bill Hartley
Matsqui	Deb Charrois; 5,349 – 24.93%	Michael de Jong; 10,903 – 50.81%	Simon Gibson; 4,405 – 20.53%		Sam Wager; 216 – 1.01%	Kathleen Mary Toth (FCP) 385 – 1.79%; Georgina Wilson (NLP) 199 – 0.93%	Peter A. Dueck
Mission-Kent	Dennis Streifel; 8,232 – 44.16%	Abe Neufeld; 7,112 – 38.15%	Frank Sleigh; 1,618 – 8.68%	Heather Sebastian; 1,243 – 6.67%	Hans Grages; 324 – 1.74%	Chum Richardson; 113 – 0.61%	Dennis Streifel
Nanaimo	Dale Lovick; 11,210 – 48.75%	Gary Richard Korpan; 7,672 – 33.36%	Garry D. Shepp; 1,867 – 8.12%	David J. Weston; 1,337 – 5.81%	Karen M. Shillington; 486 – 2.11%	Vicki Podetz (FCP) 311 – 1.35%; Mark Chase (Ltn.) 113 – 0.49%	Dale Lovick
Nelson-Creston	Corky Evans; 9,179 – 44.90%	Howard Dirks; 6,434 – 31.47%	Brian Dale Gaschnitz; 2,114 – 10.34%		Andy Shadrack; 2,282 – 11.16%	Brian John Zacharias (FCP) 360 – 1.76%; Ruth Anne Taves (NLP) 73 – 0.36%	Corky Evans
New Westminster	Graeme Bowbrick; 10,418 – 46.69%	Helen Sparkes; 8,591 – 38.50%	Brian Stromgren; 1,446 – 6.48%	Craig Sahlin; 1,121 – 5.02%	Michael G. Horn; 488 – 2.19%	Arthur Crossman 142 – 0.64%; George Bauch (NLP) 107 – 0.48%	Anita Hagen
North Coast	Dan Miller; 7,298 – 64.82%	Odd Eidsvik; 2,899 – 25.75%	Clarence Hall; 830 – 7.37%		Patrick Lemaire; 232 – 2.06%		Dan Miller
North Island	Glenn Robertson; 8,385 – 45.80%	Gerry Furney; 6,781 – 37.04%	Dave Jackson; 1,776 – 9.70%	Mark Grenier; 887 – 4.84%	Don Malcolm; 479 – 2.62%		Colin S. Gabelmann
North Vancouver-Lonsdale	David Schreck; 7,151 – 35.56%	Katherine Whittred; 9,325 – 46.37%	Stanley Dzuba; 1,241 – 6.17%	Royston Forsyth; 1,736 – 8.63%	Renee Chalut; 417 – 2.07%	Anthony Jasich (Ltn.) 149 – 0.74%; Sheila Elliott (NLP) 93 – 0.46%	David Schreck
North Vancouver-Seymour	Michelle Kemper; 6,676 – 26.56%	Daniel Jarvis; 14,165 – 56.35%	Caroline Meredith; 1,737 – 6.91%	David Massey; 1,713 – 6.81%	Mark Brooks; 645 – 2.57%	Jonn R. Kunickey (SC) 105 – 0.42%; Bill Tomlinson (Ltn.) 54 – 0.21%; Deborah Rubin (NLP) 44 – 0.18%	Daniel Jarvis
Oak Bay-Gordon Head	Elizabeth Cull; 11,700 – 44.17%	Ida Chong; 12,340 – 46.59%	Paul Yewchuk; 675 – 2.55%	Gordon Henderson; 937 – 3.54%	Lenora Burke; 566 – 2.14%	Alan Idler (FCP) 56 – 0.21%; John Ernest Currie 48 – 0.18%; John vanDyk (SC) 48 – 0.19%; Gary Zak (NLP) 47 – 0.18%; Casey Edge 35 – 0.13%; Nicholas Varzeliotis 35 – 0.13%	Elizabeth Cull
Okanagan-Boundary	Bill Barlee; 6,984 – 38.20%	Bill Barisoff; 7,011 – 38.35%	Garry Mitchell; 2,810 – 15.37%	Kevin Highfield; 775 – 4.24%	David Simm; 356 – 1.95%	Doug Biagioni (SC) 183 – 1.00%; Gregg Wilson (NLP) 163 – 0.89%	Bill Barlee
Okanagan East	Janet Elizabeth Gooch; 5,176 – 21.17%	John Weisbeck; 9,382 – 38.37%	Stamata Andrich; 3,116 – 12.74%	Judi Tyabji; 6,432 – 26.30%	Dave Cursons; 347 – 1.42%		Judi Tyabji
Okanagan-Penticton	Jim Beattie; 9,092 – 36.74%	Rick Thorpe; 10,661 – 43.07%	Loretta Krauter; 2,976 – 12.02%	Johannes L. Thoen; 1,444 – 5.83%	Harry Philip Naegel; 464 – 1.87%	Carol Ross (NLP); 113 – 0.46%	Jim Beattie
Okanagan-Vernon	Howard Brown; 7,497 – 29.95%	April Sanders; 9,776 – 39.06%	Heinz Weiss; 5,356 – 21.40%	Geoff Jell; 1,839 – 7.35%	Jane Peach; 3,34 – 1.33%	Clinton Henry (SC); 227 – 0.91%	Lyall Hanson
Okanagan West	Ken Charlish; 8,281 – 24.46%	Sindi Hawkins; 15,575 – 46.00%	Keith Thompson; 4,858 – 14.35%	Angie March; 4,225 – 12.48%	Damon Klein; 519 – 1.53%	George Lensen (SC); 399 – 1.18%	Clifford Jack Serwa
Parksville-Qualicum	Leonard Krog; 12,976 – 39.72%	Paul Reitsma; 13,459 – 41.19%	Teunis Westbroek; 3,955 – 12.11%	Garner Stone; 1,669 – 5.11%	Mark Robinson; 422 – 1.29%	Cliff Brown (NLP) 110 – 0.34%; David Martin (Common Sense) 81 – 0.25%	Leonard Krog
Peace River North	Brian Churchill; 1,975 – 18.04%	Ben Knutson; 3,137 – 28.66%	Richard Neufeld; 5,299 – 48.41%	Neil Bitterman; 169 – 1.54%		Dave Bodnar (SC) 240 – 2.19%; Brent Hoar 125 – 1.14%	Richard Neufeld
Peace River South	Patrick Michiel; 3,778 – 30.88%	Brian Haddow; 3,774 – 30.85%	Jack Weisgerber; 3,901 – 31.89%	Wade Alexander Allan; 183 – 1.50%	Shane Hartnell; 145 – 1.19%	Aime Girard (SC); 452 – 3.69%	Jack Weisgerber
Port Coquitlam	Mike Farnworth; 14,767 – 46.37%	Irene Barr; 13,310 – 41.80%	Lawrence Glazer; 1,335 – 4.19%	Rick Howard; 1,789 – 5.62%	Debra Eilers; 417 – 1.31%	Stan Mortensen (SC) 124 – 0.39%; Michael Wiebe (Ltn.) 102 – 0.32%	Mike Farnworth
Port Moody-Burnaby Mountain	Jamie Ross; 9,804 – 42.69%	Christy Clark; 10,272 – 44.73%	Diane Friesen; 1,039 – 4.52%	Margaret Connor; 1,408 – 6.13%	Oz Catt; 441 – 1.92%		Barbara E. Copping
Powell River-Sunshine Coast	Bill Forst; 6,088 – 27.57%	Cameron Reid; 3,911 – 17.71%	Don Atkinson; 677 – 3.07%	Gordon Wilson; 10,833 – 49.05%	D. Wendy Young; 518 – 2.35%	Roslyn Griston (Common Sense); 57 – 0.26%	Gordon Wilson
Prince George-Mount Robson	Lois Boone; 4,713 – 40.67%	Lorna Dittmar; 3,764 – 32.48%	Norm Lorenz; 2,076 – 17.92%	Brian Self; 788 – 6.80%	Richard Michael Zammuto; 247 – 2.13%		Lois Boone
Prince George North	Paul Ramsey; 5,837 – 39.58%	Bob Viergever; 4,923 – 33.38%	Ron Hirvi; 2,430 – 16.48%	Adele Graber; 891 – 6.04%	Carolyn Linden; 173 – 1.17%	Ken Benham; 495 – 3.36%	Paul Ramsey
Prince George-Omineca	Chuck Fraser; 5,206 – 34.82%	Paul Nettleton; 5,514 – 36.88%	Ron Ray; 2,998 – 20.05%	Carole Fraser; 1,023 – 6.84%	Todd Edward Romaine; 209 – 1.40%		Len Fox
Richmond Centre	Doug Black; 5,723 – 32.02%	Doug Symons; 9,925 – 55.52%	Shamim Akbar; 614 – 3.43%	Rob Oey; 996 – 5.57%	Manoa Friedson; 235 – 1.31%	Andrew Biernat (SC) 153 – 0.86%; Kerry Pearson (Ltn.) 126 – 0.70%; Joseph Gaudet 65 – 0.36%; Mark McCooey (NLP) 38 – 0.21%	Doug Symons
Richmond East	Balwant Sanghera; 5,763 – 31.40%	Linda Reid; 10,205 – 55.60%	Paula Peterson; 792 – 4.32%	Marc G. Schaper; 1,093 – 5.96%	Kevan Eric Hudson; 235 – 1.28%	Chris O'Toole (SC) 139 – 0.76%; Donald Veld (Cons.) 83 – 0.45%; Carina Shelly (NLP) 43 – 0.23%	Linda Reid
Richmond-Steveston	Gail Paquette; 5,041 – 29.61%	Geoff Plant; 9,643 – 56.65%	Shirley Abraham-Kirk; 556 – 3.27%	Pat Young; 919 – 5.40%	Brian Gold; 188 – 1.10%	Allan Warnke 450 – 2.64%; Gary Cross (Cons.) 99 – 0.58%; Gordon Neuls (SC) 88 – 0.52%; Nancy Stewart (NLP) 38 – 0.22%	Allan Warnke
Rossland-Trail	Ed Conroy; 8,635 – 50.74%	Jim Greene; 5,923 – 34.80%	Phillip Morris; 1,366 – 8.03%	Kathy Plummer; 660 – 3.88%	Clare Greidanus; 434 – 2.55%		Ed Conroy
Saanich North and the Islands	Lynda Laushway; 10,546 – 37.51%	Murray Robert Coell; 13,374 – 47.57%	Ross Imrie; 1,627 – 5.79%	Gary Lundy; 1,533 – 5.45%	Wally du Temple; 898 – 3.19%	Paul Tessier (NLP) 72 – 0.26%; Zino Del Monte (WCC) 63 – 0.22%	Clive Tanner
Saanich South	Andrew Petter; 11,394 – 46.11%	Frank Leonard; 10,867 – 43.98%	Colin Knecht; 676 – 2.74%	Cherie Dealey; 1,198 – 4.85%	Jack Etkin; 343 – 1.39%	Gail Anderson (NLP) 86 – 0.35%; Douglas Christie (WCC) 66 – 0.27%; Ken Wiebe (Ltn.) 40 – 0.16%; Laery Braaten (Common Sense) 38 – 0.15%	Andrew Petter
Shuswap	Calvin White; 7,869 – 31.63%	George Abbott; 8,596 – 34.55%	Colin Mayes; 5,617 – 22.58%	Bev Torrens; 1,325 – 5.33%	Paul Stephen De Felice; 237 – 0.95%	Gordon Campbell 810 – 3.26%; Robert Goss (SC) 221 – 0.89%; Merv Ritchie 204 – 0.82%	Shannon O'Neill
Skeena	Helmut Giesbrecht; 5,353 – 40.34%	Rick Wozney; 4,718 – 35.56%	Andy Burton; 2,744 – 20.68%		Doug Bodnar; 205 – 1.54%	Dave Serry (SC); 249 – 1.88%	Helmut Giesbrecht
Surrey-Cloverdale	Charan Gill; 8,831 – 29.82%	Bonnie McKinnon; 14,297 – 48.27%	Stuart Clark; 2,690 – 9.08%	Philip McCormack; 2,417 – 8.16%	David Walters; 366 – 1.24%	Heather Stilwell (FCP) 709 – 2.39%; Bill Gall (SC) 306 – 1.03%	Ken Jones
Surrey-Green Timbers	Sue Hammell; 10,278 – 50.11%	Bill Phelps; 6,930 – 33.79%	Dominic Darmanin; 1,183 – 5.77%	Gerard Baisch; 1,150 – 5.61%	Romeo De La Pena; 228 – 1.11%	Gerhard Herwig (FCP) 255 – 1.24%; Cliff Blair (Cons.) 179 – 0.87%; Victoria Kedzierski (SC) 114 – 0.56%; Don Knight 101 – 0.49%; George Gidora (Communist) 62 – 0.30%; Ross Ranger (NLP) 32 – 0.16%	Sue Hammell
Surrey-Newton	Penny Priddy; 13,969 – 49.54%	Indra Thind; 9,788 – 34.71%	Liaqat Bajwa; 1,244 – 4.41%	Ian Brown; 1,841 – 6.53%	Maureen A. MacDonald; 340 – 1.21%	Bill Stilwell (FCP) 577 – 2.05%; John Keith Bannister (Cons.) 217 – 0.77%; Neil Maharaj (SC) 174 – 0.62%; Shane Laporte (NLP) 48 – 0.17%	Penny Priddy
Surrey-Whalley	Joan Smallwood; 7,396 – 50.14%	Judy Higginbotham; 4,576 – 31.02%	John Conway; 1,302 – 8.83%	Vlad Marjanovic; 968 – 6.56%	Jens M. Haeusser; 243 – 1.65%	Dora Fehr (SC) 115 – 0.78%; Donald A. Roberts (Ltn.) 82 – 0.56%; Valerie Hubert (NLP) 70 – 0.47%	Joan Smallwood
Surrey-White Rock	David Thompson; 8,215 – 26.43%	Wilf Hurd; 18,039 – 58.04%	David Secord; 2,519 – 8.10%	Ahmad Bajwa; 1,110 – 3.57%	Steve Chitty; 677 – 2.18%	Kathy Burden 295 – 0.95%; Rick Post (SC) 226 – 0.73%	Wilf Hurd
Vancouver-Burrard	Tim Stevenson; 10,646 – 49.70%	Duncan Wilson; 7,975 – 37.23%	Aletta Buday; 671 – 3.13%	Laura McDiarmid; 1,014 – 4.73%	Imtiaz Popat; 563 – 2.63%	John Clarke (Ltn.) 458 – 2.14%; Wayne A. Melvin (NLP) 93 – 0.43%	Emery O. Barnes
Vancouver-Fraserview	Ian Waddell; 8,774 – 45.97%	Gulzar Cheema; 8,394 – 43.98%	Tim Shreeve; 643 – 3.37%	Andy Wong; 815 – 4.27%	Stephen Samuel; 225 – 1.18%	T. Glen Lockhart (SC) 177 – 0.93%; Prince Pabbies (NLP) 57 – 0.30%	Bernie Simpson
Vancouver-Hastings	Joy MacPhail; 9,894 – 54.01%	Raymond Leung; 6,345 – 34.64%	Nazario Matino; 568 – 3.10%	Joe Cafariello; 824 – 4.50%	Irene L. Schmidt; 486 – 2.65%	Carrol Woolsey (SC) 137 – 0.75%; Christian Prekratic (NLP) 64 – 0.35%	Joy MacPhail
Vancouver-Kensington	Ujjal Dosanjh; 9,496 – 50.74%	Gim Huey; 7,608 – 40.65%	Kirk Pankey; 472 – 2.52%	Don Seykens; 537 – 2.87%	Kelly White; 349 – 1.86%	Damon Wong (SC) 135 – 0.72%; Mark Toth (FCP) 119 – 0.64%	Ujjal Dosanjh
Vancouver-Kingsway	Glen Clark; 10,525 – 55.46%	Francis Ho; 6,997 – 36.87%	Graham Norton; 367 – 1.93%	Julia Marks; 518 – 2.73%	Marilyn Hogan; 264 – 1.39%	Randy Eremko (Ltn.) 98 – 0.52%; Patrick S. Saunders (SC) 75 – 0.40%; Protais Haje 69 – 0.36%; Steven R. Beck (NLP) 65 – 0.34%	Glen Clark
Vancouver-Langara	Ragini Rankin; 5,515 – 30.08%	Val J. Anderson; 11,038 – 60.20%	Christie Jung; 519 – 2.83%	Philip Read; 839 – 4.58%	Michael Airton; 337 – 1.84%	Jerry Zen-Jih Chang (NLP); 89 – 0.49%	Val J. Anderson
Vancouver-Little Mountain	Margaret Birrell; 9,390 – 39.20%	Gary Farrell-Collins; 12,036 – 50.25%	David J. Waine; 489 – 2.04%	Ted Philip Badley; 1,062 – 4.43%	Stuart Parker; 714 – 2.98%	Dan Grant 96 – 0.40%; Gerold Kuklinski (SC) 85 – 0.35%; Estelle Brooke (NLP) 82 – 0.34%	Tom Perry
Vancouver-Mount Pleasant	Jenny W. C. Kwan; 11,155 – 64.05%	Anne Beer; 4,243 – 24.36%	Wayne Marsden; 354 – 2.03%	John Spark; 584 – 3.35%	Paul Alexander; 759 – 4.36%	Kimball Cariou (Communist) 121 – 0.69%; John S. W. Kent (NLP) 114 – 0.65%; Agnes Kokko (SC) 86 – 0.49%	Mike Harcourt
Vancouver-Point Grey	Jim Green; 11,074 – 42.81%	Gordon Campbell; 12,637 – 48.86%	Sager Jan; 406 – 1.57%	Allison Mountstevens; 857 – 3.31%	Ralph Maud; 683 – 2.64%	Ron Decter (NLP) 76 – 0.29%; Michael J. P. Moen (Cons.) 70 – 0.27%; E'an P. Rankin (FCP) 62 – 0.24%	Darlene R. Marzari
Vancouver-Quilchena	Roger Boshier; 4,977 – 22.04%	Colin Hansen; 15,509 – 68.68%	Jay Davison; 495 – 2.19%	Richard Chave Sanderson; 827 – 3.66%	Valerie Jerome; 627 – 2.78%	Lorraine Hinton (SC) 91 – 0.40%; Alan Mackenzie Brooke (NLP) 57 – 0.25%	Art Cowie
Victoria-Beacon Hill	Gretchen Brewin; 11,960 – 52.51%	Howard Markson; 7,636 – 33.52%	Ken Conrad; 654 – 2.87%	Richard Fahl; 1,093 – 4.80%	Stephen DeMeulenaere; 1,008 – 4.43%	Lance vanDyk (SC) 96 – 0.42%; Jill Kolbinson (Ltn.) 92 – 0.40%; Sequoia Nathan Maxwell 73 – 0.32%; Cal Danyluk (NLP) 64 – 0.28%; Bob Ward (WCC) 59 – 0.26%; Johnny Douglas (Common Sense) 43 – 0.19%	Gretchen Brewin
Victoria-Hillside	Steve Orcherton; 11,585 – 53.32%	Sheila Orr; 6,862 – 31.58%	Dan Willson; 979 – 4.51%	Gary Beyer; 1,227 – 5.65%	David Scott White; 790 – 3.64%	Erich Peter (WCC) 102 – 0.47%; Andy Guest (NLP) 97 – 0.45%; C. David Randall (Ltn.) 86 – 0.40%	Robin Blencoe
West Vancouver-Capilano	Daniel Reeve; 3,486 – 14.90%	Jeremy Dalton; 16,675 – 71.29%	Ted Shandro; 1,326 – 5.67%	Marina Jurlina; 1,182 – 5.05%	Matthew Ferguson; 461 – 1.97%	Jim Kelley (FCP) 174 – 0.74%; Carolyn Grayson (NLP) 47 – 0.20%; Kurt Pokrandt (Ltn.) 40 – 0.17%	Jeremy Dalton
West Vancouver-Garibaldi	Brenda Broughton; 6,288 – 29.16%	Ted Nebbeling; 12,326 – 57.17%	Jim Mercier; 1,430 – 6.63%	Roland T. French; 693 – 3.21%	Peggy Stortz; 532 – 2.47%	Mike Becker (SC) 98 – 0.45%; Tunya Audain (Ltn.) 91 – 0.42%; Muriel D. E. Down (Cons.) 68 – 0.32%; David Grayson (NLP) 36 – 0.17%	David J. Mitchell
Yale-Lillooet	Harry Lali; 7,081 – 41.06%	Jim Rabbitt; 5,912 – 34.29%	John Calvin Stinson; 3,419 – 19.83%	Richard Bennett; 706 – 4.09%		Ed Vanwoudenberg (FCP); 124 – 0.72%	Harry Lali
