= Justin Sorensen =

Canadian football player (born 1986)

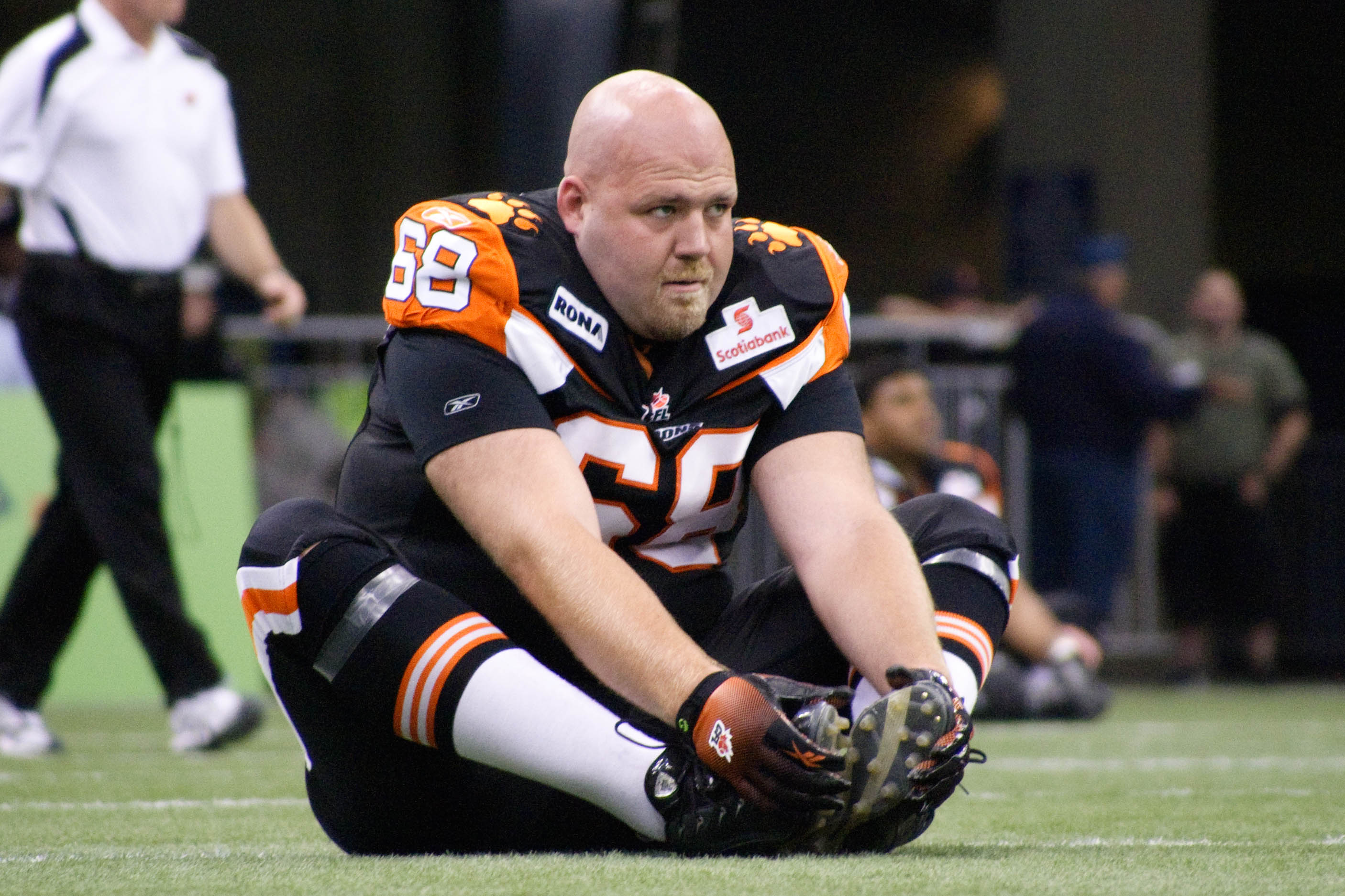
- Sorensen with the BC Lions in 2009

No. 60
- Position: Center

Personal information
- Born: June 8, 1986 (age 40); Parksville, British Columbia, Canada
- Listed height: 6 ft 8 in (2.03 m)
- Listed weight: 310 lb (141 kg)

Career information
- High school: Ballenas
- College: South Carolina
- CFL draft: 2008: 1st round, 5th overall pick

Career history
- 2009–2010: BC Lions
- 2012–2013: Winnipeg Blue Bombers
- 2014–2018: Edmonton Eskimos

Awards and highlights
- Grey Cup champion (2015); CFL West All-Star (2016)
- Stats at CFL.ca

Justin Sorensen (born June 8, 1986) is a Canadian former professional football offensive lineman who played in the Canadian Football League (CFL). He was drafted by the BC Lions in the first round of the 2008 CFL draft and spent two years with the team before joining the Winnipeg Blue Bombers. After two seasons with the Blue Bombers, he signed as a free agent with the Edmonton Eskimos on February 11, 2014. He earned his first Grey Cup championship as a member of the 103rd Grey Cup champion Eskimos, starting at centre in both the West Final and Grey Cup. He played college football for the South Carolina Gamecocks.

Sorensen attended Ballenas Secondary School, where he was co-team captain for the Ballenas Whalers football team. Justin was widely regarded as the top offensive lineman in BC High School Football and received heavy NCAA D1 interest. Justin was a two-way starter as the top offensive tackle in the league and a solid defensive lineman.
