= Carson Rockhill =

Canadian football player (born 1990)

No. 64
- Position: Offensive guard

Personal information
- Born: June 30, 1990 (age 36); Nanaimo, British Columbia, Canada
- Listed height: 6 ft 6 in (1.98 m)
- Listed weight: 284 lb (129 kg)

Career information
- High school: Ballenas (BC)
- University: Calgary
- CFL draft: 2012: 2nd round, 13th overall pick

Career history
- 2013: Edmonton Eskimos
- 2014: Hamilton Tiger-Cats

Carson Giovanni Rockhill (born June 30, 1990) is a Canadian former professional football offensive guard who played one season in the Canadian Football League (CFL) for the Hamilton Tiger-Cats. He was selected by the Tiger-Cats in the 2nd round (13th overall) of the 2012 CFL draft.

== Early life and education ==
Rockhill was born on June 30, 1990, in Nanaimo, British Columbia. He attended Ballenas Secondary School in Parksville, British Columbia, playing offense and defense. Following high school he joined University of Calgary, spending his first season on the football team as a redshirt. During the 2009 off-season, Rockhill represented Canada at the 2009 IFAF Junior World Championship, helping his team earn runner-up honors. As a freshman in 2009, he played in six of eight games, in addition to all four playoff games as an offensive lineman. He appeared in all 12 games the following year, starting one. He earned a starting position in 2011, playing in every game again. Though selected in the second round of the 2012 CFL draft, Rockhill elected to remain with Calgary and finish his education. He played in all eight games as a senior.

== Professional career ==
He was selected in the 2nd round (13th overall) of the 2012 CFL draft by the Hamilton Tiger-Cats, but chose to continue his education. His rights were acquired by the Edmonton Eskimos in a five-player trade in 2013. He was released by Edmonton on June 23, 2013, before playing in any games. He was signed by the Tiger-Cats after being released by the Eskimos. He did not play in 2013. In 2014, Rockhill appeared in three games as a backup offensive lineman before being released.

== Personal life ==
Rockhill's older brother Brandon was also a player for Calgary, and they spent two years playing with the team together.
