= Andrew Marshall (Canadian football) =

Canadian football player (born 1990)

Profile
- Position: Defensive lineman

Personal information
- Born: June 22, 1990 (age 36); Nanoose Bay, British Columbia, Canada
- Listed height: 6 ft 3 in (1.91 m)
- Listed weight: 240 lb (109 kg)

Career information
- High school: Parksville (BC) Ballenas
- University: Simon Fraser

Career history
- 2013: Calgary Stampeders*
- 2013: BC Lions
- 2013–2018: Ottawa Redblacks
- 2019: Edmonton Eskimos
- * Offseason or practice squad member only

Awards and highlights
- Grey Cup champion (2016)
- Stats at CFL.ca

Andrew Marshall (born June 22, 1990) is a Canadian former professional football defensive lineman who played in the Canadian Football League (CFL) for the BC Lions and Ottawa Redblacks. He played CIS football and NCAA football at Simon Fraser University. He was also a member of the Calgary Stampeders and Edmonton Eskimos of the CFL but did not appear in any games for those teams.

== Early life ==
Marshall attended Ballenas Secondary School in Parksville, British Columbia.

== Professional career ==
=== Calgary Stampeders ===
Marshall was signed by the Calgary Stampeders on April 25, 2013. He was released by the Stampeders on June 23, 2013.

=== BC Lions ===
Marshall signed with the BC Lions on July 8, 2013. He played in his first career game on September 27, 2013, against the Winnipeg Blue Bombers.

=== Ottawa Redblacks ===
Marshall was drafted by the Ottawa Redblacks in the third round of the 2013 CFL expansion draft. He played in 82 games from 2014 to 2018 with the club and recorded 12 defensive tackles, 56 special teams tackles, three sacks, one interception, and two forced fumbles over that time. He also played in three Grey Cup games, winning the 104th Grey Cup in 2016. He became a free agent on February 12, 2019.

=== Edmonton Eskimos ===
On February 22, 2019, it was announced that Marshall had signed with the Edmonton Eskimos. He spent the 2019 season on the six-game injury list due to an injury endured in training camp. He was later released on January 17, 2020.
