= Leonard Krog =

Canadian politician & lawyer (born 1953/54)

His Worship Leonard Krog
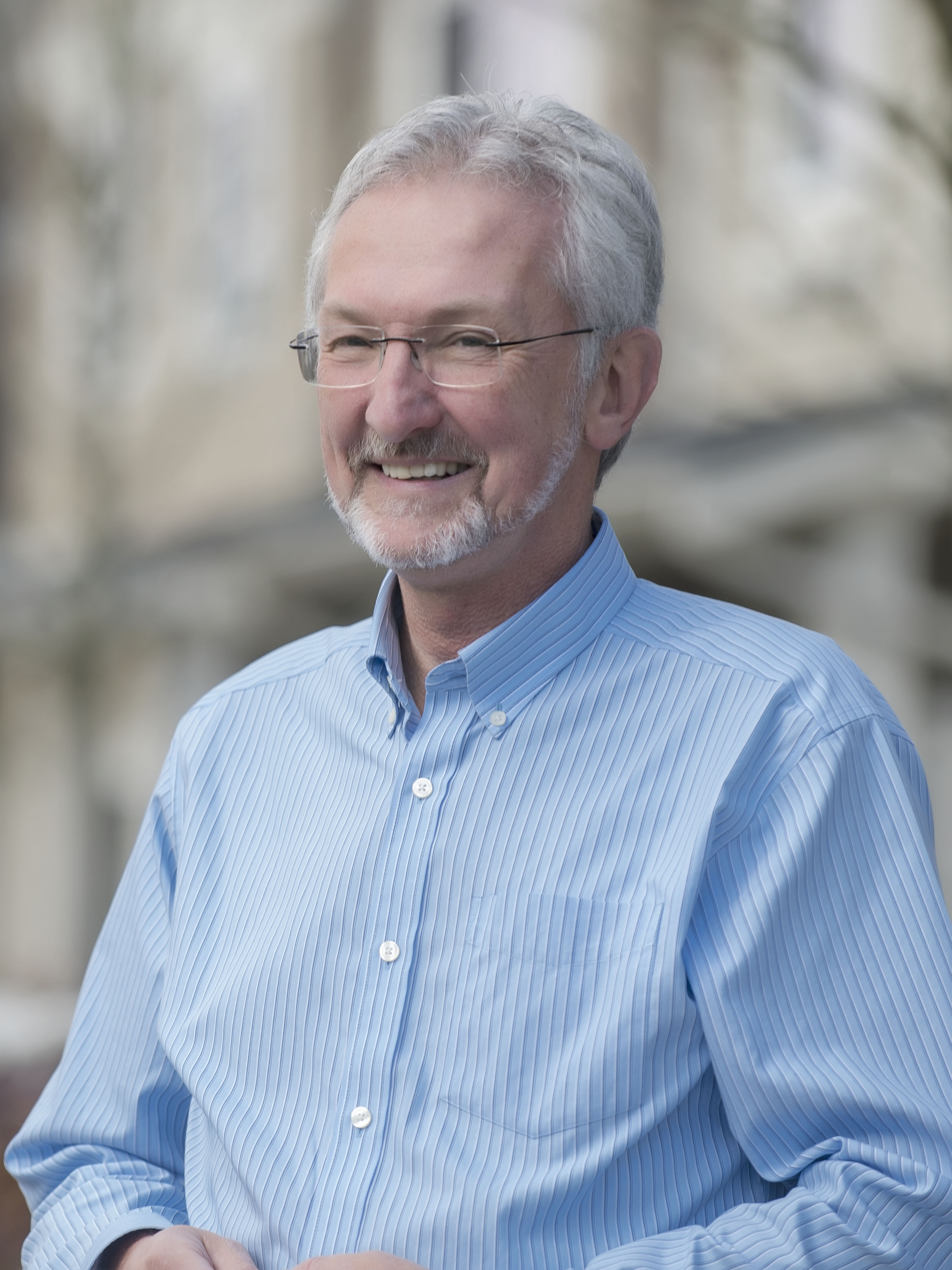

Mayor of Nanaimo
- Incumbent
- Assumed office November 5, 2018
- Preceded by: Bill McKay

Member of the Legislative Assembly of British Columbia
- In office May 17, 2005 – November 30, 2018
- Riding: Nanaimo
- Preceded by: Mike Hunter
- Succeeded by: Sheila Malcolmson
- In office October 17, 1991 – May 28, 1996
- Riding: Parksville-Qualicum
- Preceded by: Riding established
- Succeeded by: Paul Reitsma

Personal details
- Born: 1953 or 1954 (age 72–73) Nanaimo, British Columbia
- Party: Independent (since 2018)
- Other political affiliations: New Democratic (before 2018)
- Spouse: Sharon Krog
- Education: University of British Columbia Faculty of Law
- Profession: Lawyer

Leonard Eugene Krog is a Canadian politician and lawyer in British Columbia, who currently serves as mayor of Nanaimo. He previously served in the provincial legislature on two occasions as a member of the British Columbia New Democratic Party (BC NDP), representing the riding of Parksville-Qualicum from 1991 to 1996, and the riding of Nanaimo from 2005 to 2018.

== Biography ==
Born in Nanaimo, Krog grew up in the community of Coombs as the youngest of four children. His father Doug, a logging contractor, drowned when he was four, after which his mother Eileen returned to teaching. He graduated with a Bachelor of Laws degree from the University of British Columbia Faculty of Law in 1979, and was called to the bar in 1980. He operated a law practice in Nanaimo with his wife Sharon, whom he married in 1973; they have two children together.

Krog was first elected as member of the Legislative Assembly (MLA) for Parksville-Qualicum in the 1991 general election. During that term, he served as a backbencher in the Mike Harcourt NDP government. He ran for re-election in 1996 but was defeated by BC Liberal candidate Paul Reitsma. Following Reitsma's resignation in June 1998, Krog ran for the seat again in the December by-election, but lost to the Liberal's Judith Reid.

He attempted to re-enter the legislature by running for the NDP in the riding of Nanaimo at the 2001 election. However, with the NDP trailing in the polls, he finished second behind Liberal candidate Mike Hunter. While out of the legislature, Krog ran in the 2003 BC NDP leadership election, finishing in second place behind Carole James in the second ballot.

He faced Hunter again in the 2005 election; this time Krog won the seat in Nanaimo. He was subsequently re-elected in the 2009, 2013 and 2017 elections, serving as opposition critic to the Attorney General. When the NDP formed government in 2017, Krog was appointed Government Caucus Chair in the legislature.

On October 20, 2018, he was elected mayor of Nanaimo; he resigned as Nanaimo MLA on November 30 of that year. He handily won re-election in the 2022 mayoral race, and was re-elected in 2026 by a narrower margin.

== Electoral record ==
=== 2026 Nanaimo mayoral election ===
| Party | Mayoral candidate | Votes | % |
|---|---|---|---|
| Independent | Leonard Krog (X) † | 10,368 | 41.08 |
| Independent | Sarah Lovegrove | 8,461 | 33.52 |
| REAL | Anne Marie Dryden | 6,084 | 24.10 |
| Independent | Brunie Brunie | 327 | 1.30 |

=== 2022 Nanaimo mayoral election ===
| Mayoral candidate | Vote | % |
|---|---|---|
| Leonard Krog (X) † | 12,390 | 68.41 |
| Tasha Brown | 4,207 | 23.23 |
| Agnes Provost | 792 | 4.37 |
| Brunie Brunie | 723 | 3.99 |

=== 2018 Nanaimo mayoral election ===
| Mayoral candidate | Vote | % |
|---|---|---|
| Leonard Krog | 20,040 | 73.66 |
| Don H. Hubbard | 6,802 | 25.00 |
| Raymon T. Farmere | 365 | 1.34 |

2017 British Columbia general election: Nanaimo
| Party | Candidate | Votes | % | ±% | Expenditures |
|---|---|---|---|---|---|
| New Democratic | Leonard Krog | 12,746 | 46.54 | +0.83 | $27,486 |
| Liberal | Paris Gaudet | 8,911 | 32.54 | −4.66 | $68,406 |
| Green | Kathleen Harris | 5,454 | 19.91 | +9.31 | $5,042 |
| Libertarian | Bill Walker | 277 | 1.01 | – | $2,583 |
| Total valid votes | | 27,388 | 100.00 | – | |
| Total rejected ballots | | 137 | 0.50 | +0.06 | |
| Turnout | | 27,525 | 62.30 | +4.14 | |
| Registered voters | | 44,184 | | | |
| New Democratic hold | | Swing | | +2.75 | |
Source: Elections BC

2013 British Columbia general election: Nanaimo
| Party | Candidate | Votes | % | ±% | Expenditures |
|---|---|---|---|---|---|
| New Democratic | Leonard Krog | 10,821 | 46.25 | −7.08 | $57,730 |
| Liberal | Walter Douglas Anderson | 8,568 | 36.62 | +0.32 | $37,016 |
| Green | Ian Elliot Gartshore | 2,532 | 10.82 | +1.68 | $5,020 |
| Conservative | Bryce Nelson Crigger | 1,221 | 5.22 | – | $6,297 |
| Independent | Brunie Brunie | 253 | 1.09 | – | $1,339 |
| Total valid votes | | 23,395 | 100.00 | – | |
| Total rejected ballots | | 103 | 0.44 | −0.27 | |
| Turnout | | 23,498 | 57.96 | +0.84 | |
| Registered voters | | 40,545 | | | |
| New Democratic hold | | Swing | | −3.70 | |
Source: Elections BC

2009 British Columbia general election: Nanaimo
| Party | Candidate | Votes | % | ±% |
|---|---|---|---|---|
| New Democratic | Leonard Krog | 11,877 | 53.33 | +7.9 |
| Liberal | Jeet Manhas | 8,086 | 36.31 | -6.2 |
| Green | Dirk Becker | 2,036 | 9.14 | -0.8 |
| Refederation | Linden Robert Shaw | 272 | 1.22 | |
| Total valid votes | | 22,271 | 99.29 | |
| Total rejected ballots | | 160 | 0.71 | |
| Turnout | | 22,431 | 57.12 | |
| Eligible voters | | 39,273 | | |
| New Democratic hold | | Swing | | +7.1 |

^ Change is based on redistributed results.

2005 British Columbia general election: Nanaimo
| Party | Candidate | Votes | % | ±% |
|---|---|---|---|---|
| New Democratic | Leonard Krog | 13,226 | 51.90 | +21.67 |
| Liberal | Mike Hunter | 8,657 | 33.97 | -10.67 |
| Green | Doug Catley | 2,933 | 11.51 | -5.94 |
| Marijuana | Mat Dillon | 294 | 1.15 | -2.92 |
| Independent | Brunie Brunie | 204 | 0.80 | -0.11 |
| Refederation | Linden Robert Shaw | 169 | 0.66 | – |
| Total valid votes | | 25,483 | 99.45 | |
| Total rejected ballots | | 140 | 0.55 | +0.05 |
| Turnout | | 25,623 | 62.83 | -7.04 |
| Eligible voters | | 40,782 | | |
| New Democratic gain from Liberal | | Swing | | +16.17 |

=== 2003 British Columbia New Democratic Party leadership election ===
First Ballot
| Candidate | Votes | Percentage |
|---|---|---|
| Carole James | 325 | 41.91 |
| Nils Jensen | 169 | 21.81 |
| Leonard Krog | 150 | 19.35 |
| Steve Orcherton | 87 | 11.23 |
| Mehdi Najari | 32 | 4.13 |
| Peter Dimitrov | 12 | 1.55 |
| Total | 775 | 100.00 |

Second Ballot
| Candidate | Weighted Votes | Percentage | +/- |
|---|---|---|---|
| Carole James | 395 | 50.90 | +8.96 |
| Leonard Krog | 219 | 28.22 | +8.87 |
| Nils Jensen | 162 | 20.88 | –0.93 |
| Total | 776 | 100.00 | |

2001 British Columbia general election: Nanaimo
| Party | Candidate | Votes | % | ±% | Expenditures |
|---|---|---|---|---|---|
| Liberal | Mike Hunter | 9,748 | 44.64 | +11.28 | $46,911 |
| New Democratic | Leonard Krog | 6,602 | 30.23 | -18.51 | $15,152 |
| Green | Doug Catley | 3,810 | 17.45 | +15.33 | $3,225 |
| Marijuana | Donald Edgar Lavallée | 889 | 4.07 | – | $428 |
| Unity | Steve Miller | 588 | 2.69 | – | $1,799 |
| Independent | Brunie Brunie | 199 | 0.91 | – | $530 |
| Total valid votes | | 21,836 | 99.50 | | |
| Total rejected ballots | | 110 | 0.50 | -0.27 | |
| Turnout | | 21,946 | 69.87 | +0.08 | |
| Registered voters | | 31,412 | | | |
| Liberal gain from New Democratic | | Swing | | +14.90 | |

British Columbia provincial by-election, December 14, 1998: Parksville-Qualicum Resignation of Paul Reitsma (June 23, 1998)
| Party | Candidate | Votes | % | ±% | Expenditures |
|---|---|---|---|---|---|
| Liberal | Judith Reid | 13,862 | 52.61 | +11.42 | $80,746 |
| New Democratic | Leonard Krog | 5,978 | 22.69 | -17.03 | $51,078 |
| Progressive Democrat | Bruce Hampson | 3,585 | 13.61 | +8.50 | $32,872 |
| Reform | Roger Rocan | 1,560 | 5.92 | -6.19 | $13,303 |
| Green | Stuart Parker | 458 | 1.74 | +0.45 | $100 |
| Independent | Brunie Brunie | 419 | 1.67 | – | $650 |
| Independent | Bruce Ryder | 163 | 0.62 | – | $106 |
| Independent | Les Blank | 136 | 0.51 | – | $923 |
| Family Coalition | Mary Elinor Moreau | 94 | 0.35 | – | $1,849 |
| British Columbia Party | John Motiuk | 74 | 0.28 | – | $9,988 |
| Total valid votes/expense limit | | 26,349 | 100.0 | – | |
| Total rejected ballots | | 55 | 0.38 | | |
| Turnout | | 26,404 | 60.09 | | |
| Liberal hold | | Swing | | +14.22 | |
By-election due to the resignation of Paul Reitsma
Source(s) "December 14, 1998 By-election" (PDF). Legislative Assembly of British Columbia. December 14, 1998.

1996 British Columbia general election: Parksville-Qualicum
| Party | Candidate | Votes | % | ±% |
|---|---|---|---|---|
| Liberal | Paul Reitsma | 13,459 | 41.19 | +5.90 |
| New Democratic | Leonard Krog | 12,976 | 39.72 | -0.52 |
| Reform | Teunis Westbroek | 5,846 | 12.11 | – |
| Progressive Democrat | Garner Stone | 1,669 | 5.11 | – |
| Green | Mark Robinson | 422 | 1.29 | +0.12 |
| Natural Law | Cliff Brown | 110 | 0.34 | – |
| Common Sense | David Martin | 81 | 0.24 | – |
| Total valid votes | | 32,672 | 100.00 | |
| Total rejected ballots | | 143 | 0.44 | |
| Turnout | | 32,815 | 77.12 | |
| Liberal gain from New Democratic | | Swing | | +3.21 |

1991 British Columbia general election: Parksville-Qualicum
| Party | Candidate | Votes | % | Expenditures |
|---|---|---|---|---|
| New Democratic | Leonard Krog | 10,408 | 40.24 | $47,385.69 |
| Liberal | William J. Patrick | 9,128 | 35.29 | $4,703.30 |
| Social Credit | Janet Crapo | 5,846 | 22.60 | $67,722.89 |
| Green | Ernie Yacob | 303 | 1.17 | $$596.50 |
| Family Coalition | Augustine J. Cunningham | 180 | 0.70 | $439.00 |
| Total valid votes | | 25,863 | 100.00 | |
| Total rejected ballots | | 398 | | |
| Turnout | | 26,261 | 79.24 | |
