= Michelle Stilwell =

Canadian athlete and politician

Michelle Stilwell PLY
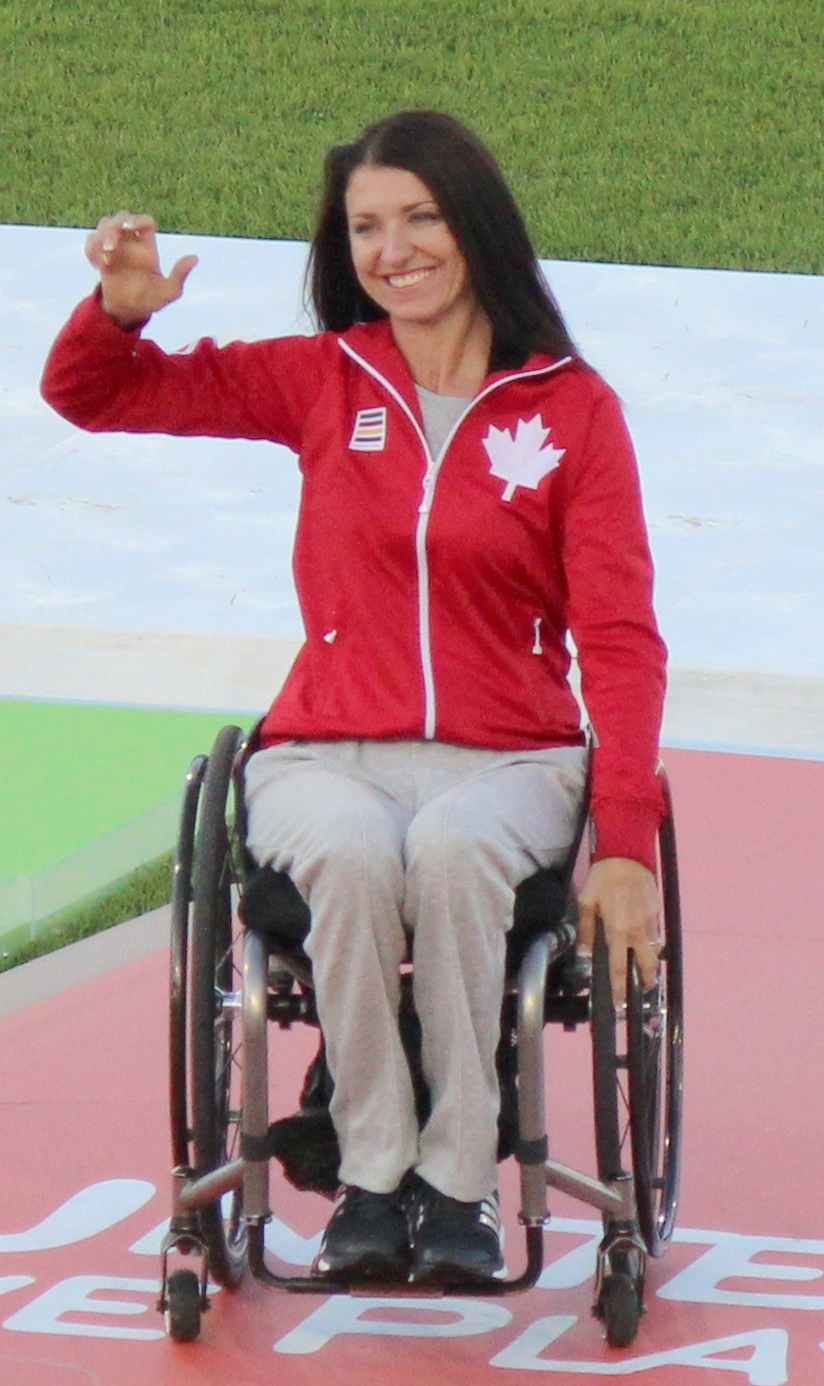
- Stilwell at the 2015 Parapan American Games

Member of the British Columbia Legislative Assembly for Parksville-Qualicum
- In office May 14, 2013 – September 21, 2020
- Preceded by: Ron Cantelon
- Succeeded by: Adam Walker

Minister of Social Development and Social Innovation of British Columbia
- In office February 2, 2015 – July 18, 2017
- Premier: Christy Clark
- Preceded by: Don McRae
- Succeeded by: Shane Simpson (Minister of Social Development and Poverty Reduction)

Personal details
- Born: Michelle Bauknecht; July 4, 1974 (age 52) Winnipeg, Manitoba, Canada
- Party: BC Liberal
- Spouse: Mark Stilwell (m. 1997)
- Education: University of Calgary
- Sports career
- Height: 170 cm (5 ft 7 in)
- Weight: 51 kg (112 lb)
- Disability class: T52
Medal record
Representing Canada
Women's wheelchair basketball
Paralympic Games
Gold medal – first place	2000 Sydney	Team
Women's para athletics
Paralympic Games
Gold medal – first place	2008 Beijing	100m T52
Gold medal – first place	2008 Beijing	200m T52
Gold medal – first place	2012 London	200m T52
Silver medal – second place	2012 London	100m T52
Gold medal – first place	2016 Rio de Janeiro	100m T52
Gold medal – first place	2016 Rio de Janeiro	400m T52
Parapan American Games
Gold medal – first place	2015 Toronto	100m T52

Michelle Stilwell (nee Bauknecht; born July 4, 1974) is a Canadian athlete and politician. She represented Canada at four Summer Paralympic Games (2000, 2008, 2012 and 2016), as well as the 2015 Parapan American Games. She competed in wheelchair basketball before becoming a wheelchair racer, and is the only female Paralympic athlete to win gold medals in two separate summer sport events.

As a politician, she represented the electoral district of Parksville-Qualicum in the Legislative Assembly of British Columbia from 2013 to 2020 as part of the British Columbia Liberal Party caucus, and served as Minister of Social Development and Social Innovation of British Columbia from 2015 to 2017.

== Early life and education ==
Michelle Bauknecht was born on July 4, 1974, in Winnipeg, Manitoba, Canada. She is the youngest of four children, and worked at her parents' hotel in her youth. Weeks before graduating from River East Collegiate, she broke her neck from a fall at the age of 17 and became an incomplete quadriplegic, with limited hand and wrist functions. After the accident, she competed in wheelchair basketball, through which she met her husband Mark Stilwell at the 1996 National Championships in Montreal. Stilwell eventually moved to Calgary, and completed her Bachelor of Science degree in psychology at the University of Calgary in 1999.

== Athletic career ==
Stilwell stayed in Calgary from 1997 until 2000 to train for the Canada women's national wheelchair basketball team, winning gold at the 1998 Women's Wheelchair Basketball World Championship. She then competed as a reserve for Team Canada at the 2000 Paralympic Games, where her team won the gold medal. Afterwards, Stilwell, her husband Mark, and their newborn son moved to Parksville, British Columbia in 2001.

However, Stilwell was forced to forgo wheelchair basketball after undergoing surgery for a herniated brain stem. Although unable to compete at the national level, Stilwell continued to play basketball locally where she was spotted by coach Peter Lawless, who convinced her to try for wheelchair racing. At the 2006 IPC Athletics World Championships, she won gold in the women's T52 200m event, and silver in the women's T52 100m event.

Stilwell qualified for the 2008 Paralympic Games where she won two gold medals in the women's T52 200m and 100m events. At the 2011 World Championships in Christchurch, New Zealand, she won the gold medals in the 100m, 200m and 400m events, as well as the silver medal in the 800m event; she set the World Championship records in the 100m and 200m races.

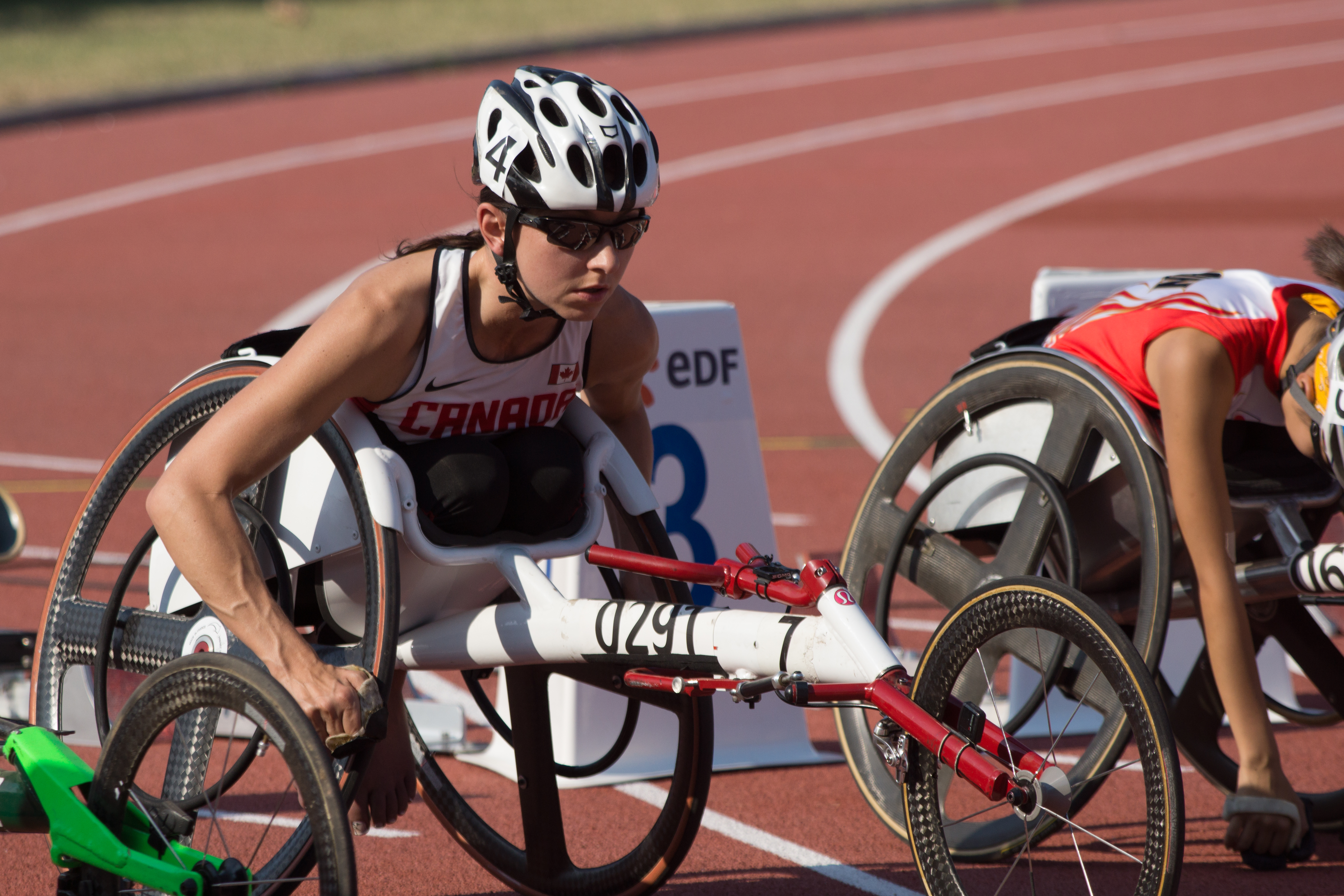
Stilwell at the 2013 IPC Athletics World Championships

At the London 2012 Paralympic Games, Stilwell defended her Paralympic gold medal in the women's 200m event in 33.80 seconds, shattering her Games record by over two seconds. Four days later, Stilwell captured a silver medal in the 100m event after mishap caused her to fall behind Marieke Vervoort. The following year, she competed in the 2013 IPC Athletics World Championships and won gold at the 100m, 200m and 800m events, setting a new world record in the women's T52 800m race. She took the gold medal in the women's T52 100m event at the 2015 Parapan American Games in Toronto.

In 2016, her last Paralympic Games, Stilwell earned gold medals at the women's 100m and 400m events, setting a Paralympics record during the latter race with a time of one minute and 5.42 seconds. The following year, Stilwell announced her retirement from competitive sports. She was inducted into the BC Sports Hall of Fame in 2017, and the Manitoba Sports Hall of Fame in 2019.

She was named to the board of directors of the Canadian Paralympic Committee in 2022.

== Political career ==
With incumbent BC Liberal member of the Legislative Assembly for Parksville-Qualicum Ron Cantelon declining to seek re-election, Stilwell was acclaimed as the party's candidate for the riding in the 2013 provincial election. She was elected to the Legislative Assembly of British Columbia at the May election, and was named government caucus chair and Parliamentary Secretary for Healthy Living in June 2013, before adding Parliamentary Secretary to the Minister of Health for Seniors to her responsibilities in June 2014. Following Don McRae's resignation from cabinet, Stilwell was sworn in as Minister for Social Development and Social Innovation in February 2015.

Stilwell was re-elected in 2017 and retained her post in Premier Christy Clark's cabinet, until the Liberal minority government's defeat in a non-confidence motion. After the British Columbia New Democratic Party (BC NDP) formed government in July 2017, Stilwell served on the Official Opposition bench as critic for Tourism, Arts and Culture for the remainder of the 41st Parliament.

After losing her seat in the 2020 election to BC NDP candidate Adam Walker, Stilwell joined CVM Medical as director of COVID-19 rapid testing in 2021.

== Electoral record ==
2020 British Columbia general election: Parksville-Qualicum
Party	Candidate	Votes	%	±%	Expenditures
New Democratic	Adam Walker	13,207	42.00	+13.34	$6,991.73
Liberal	Michelle Stilwell	11,155	35.47	−9.66	$45,718.10
Green	Rob Lyon	5,227	16.62	−8.82	$2,772.94
Conservative	Don Purdey	1,404	4.46	–	$1,413.44
Independent	John St John	454	1.44	–	$0.00
Total valid votes		31,447	100.00	–	
Total rejected ballots		223	0.71	+0.22	
Turnout		31,670	64.65	-5.56	
Registered voters		48,986			
New Democratic gain from Liberal		Swing		+11.5	
Source: Elections BC

2017 British Columbia general election: Parksville-Qualicum
Party	Candidate	Votes	%	±%	Expenditures
Liberal	Michelle Stilwell	13,604	45.13	−5.00	$53,948
New Democratic	Sue Powell	9,189	28.66	−8.40	$44,326
Green	Glenn Sollitt	8,157	25.44	–	$10,490
Refederation	Terry Hand	245	0.77	–	$0
Total valid votes		32,059	100.00	–	
Total rejected ballots		159	0.49	−0.15	
Turnout		32,218	70.21	+2.27	
Registered voters		45,891			
Liberal hold		Swing		+1.70	
Source: Elections BC

2013 British Columbia general election: Parksville-Qualicum
Party	Candidate	Votes	%	±%
Liberal	Michelle Stilwell	14,518	50.13	-1.29
New Democratic	Barry Avis	10,732	37.06	-0.94
Conservative	David Bernard Coupland	3,710	12.81	–
Total valid votes		28,960	100.00	–
Total rejected ballots		186	0.64	+0.15
Turnout		29,146	67.94	+2.24
Registered voters		42,898		
Liberal hold		Swing		-1.11
Source: Elections BC

== Awards and honours ==
Ribbon	Description	Notes
	Queen Elizabeth II Diamond Jubilee Medal	Decoration awarded in 2012; Canadian version
	King Charles III Coronation Medal	Decoration awarded in 2024; Canadian version; nominated via the Rick Hansen Foundation
