= Athletics at the 2008 Summer Paralympics – Women's 200 metres T52 =

Women's 200m T52 at the XIII Paralympic Games
- Venue: Beijing National Stadium
- Dates: 11 September
- Competitors: 8 from 5 nations
- Winning time: 36.18

Medalists
| 1st place, gold medalist(s) | | Michelle Stilwell | Canada |
| 2nd place, silver medalist(s) | | Tomomi Yamaki | Japan |
| 3rd place, bronze medalist(s) | | Pia Schmid | Switzerland |

The women's 200m T52 event at the 2008 Summer Paralympics took place at the Beijing National Stadium on 11 September. There were no heats in this event.

== Final ==
Competed at 11:12.

| Rank | Name | Nationality | Time | Notes |
|---|---|---|---|---|
| 1st place, gold medalist(s) | Michelle Stilwell | Canada | 36.18 | PR |
| 2nd place, silver medalist(s) | Tomomi Yamaki | Japan | 37.44 | |
| 3rd place, bronze medalist(s) | Pia Schmid | Switzerland | 39.95 | |
| 4 | Teruyo Tanaka | Japan | 40.36 | |
| 5 | Kerri Morgan | United States | 40.82 | |
| 6 | Cheryl Leitner | United States | 41.01 | |
| 7 | Mallerie Badgett | United States | 43.42 | |
| 8 | Gemma Buchholz | Australia | 44.57 | |

PR = Paralympic Record.
