= Oceanside =

Oceanside may refer to:

== Places ==
=== United States ===
- Oceanside, California
  - Oceanside Transit Center
- Oceanside, New York
  - Oceanside station (LIRR)
- Oceanside, Oregon

=== Other places ===
- Oceanside, New South Wales, Australia
- Oceanside, British Columbia, Canada

== Other uses ==
- MiraCosta College, formerly called Oceanside-Carlsbad Junior College
- Oceanside Ice Arena, ice arena in Tempe, Arizona
- USS Oceanside, American warship
