= Yamaki =

Yamaki (written: 山木 lit. "mountain tree" or 八巻) is a Japanese surname. Notable people with the surname include:

- Hideo Yamaki (山木 秀夫, born 1952), Japanese jazz musician
- Rie Yamaki (山木 里恵, born 1975), Japanese women's footballer
- Tomomi Yamaki (八巻 智美), Japanese Paralympic athlete
