= Kwalikum Secondary School =

Kwalikum Secondary
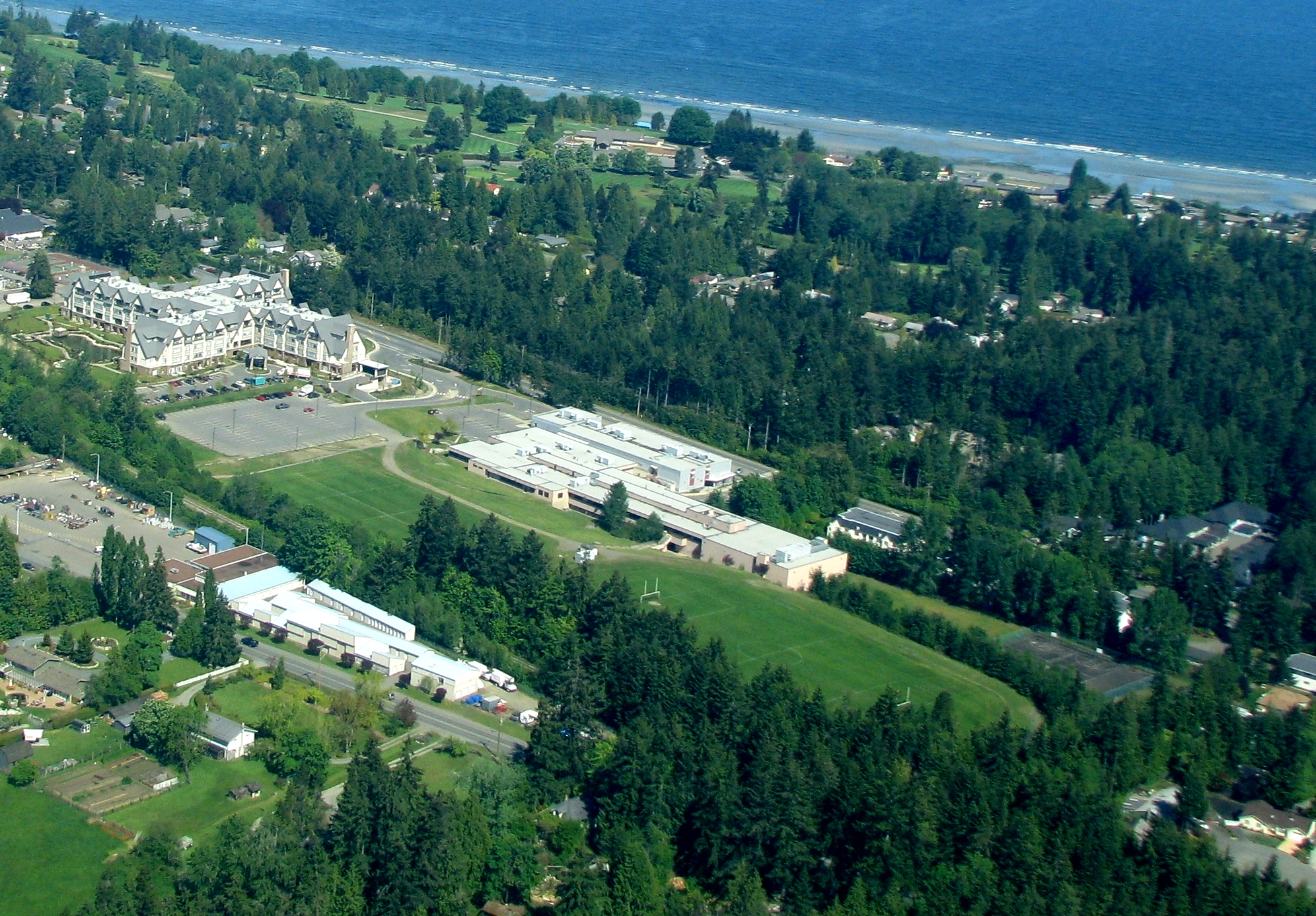
- KSS is at the centre of the image above the playing fields

Location
- Box 1000 266 Village Way; Qualicum Beach, British Columbia, V9K 1T7; Canada
- Coordinates: 49°20′53.95″N 124°26′7.21″W

Information
- School type: Public, High/Secondary school
- Established: c.1960
- School board: School District 69 Qualicum
- Principal: Mr. Lee
- Grades: 8-12
- Enrollment: 800 (2021)
- Language: English
- Team name: Kondors
- Website: kss.sd69.bc.ca

Kwalikum Secondary School is a public high school located in Qualicum Beach, British Columbia on Vancouver Island. It is of medium size and is part of School District 69 Qualicum. It was established in 1964.

== Qualicum School District facilities review ==
On October 2, 2010, the school district announced that they were considering closing KSS and requiring that its students attend Ballenas Secondary School in Parksville. Local politicians and citizens announced that they intended to fight this prospect.

At its meeting in March 2011, the SD 69 Board of Education announced a series of recommendations in support of its commitment that any decisions about school reorganization will be reached only after a comprehensive engagement with the community. This process of engagement provided School District 69 community members access to multiple opportunities to understand the impact of student enrollment on funding and educational programs and services, and to share their ideas with the Board. To this end, in March 2011, the Board initiated a comprehensive process to create a forum for discussing all the important perspectives related to this issue, and deferred any decision on potential school closures until the spring of 2012.

The school changed from having grades 9–12 to now Kwalikum Senior Secondary School with grades 8–12 as of 2015.
