= 2003 British Columbia New Democratic Party leadership election =

Canadian province party leader election

2003 New Democratic Party leadership
- November 23, 2003
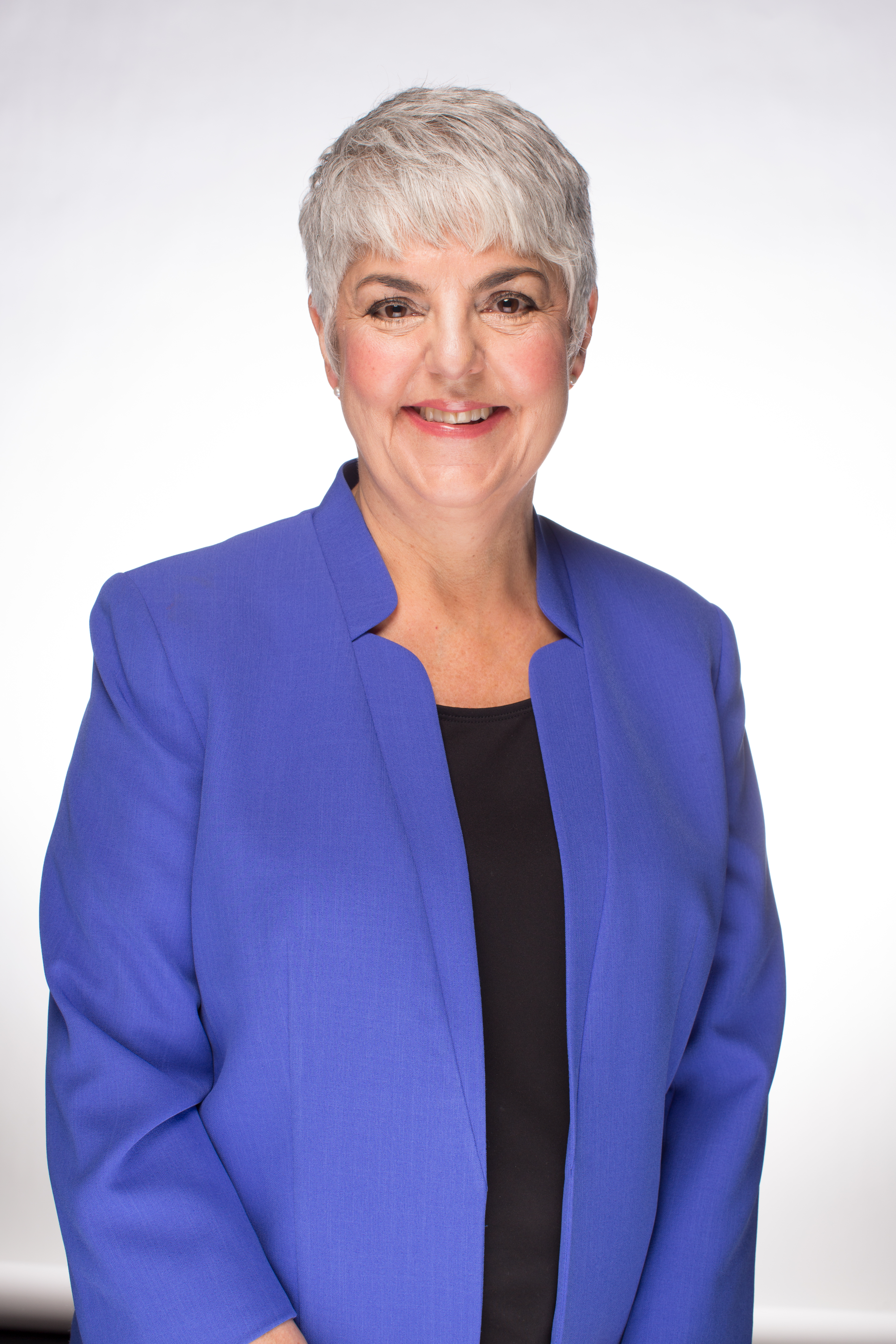

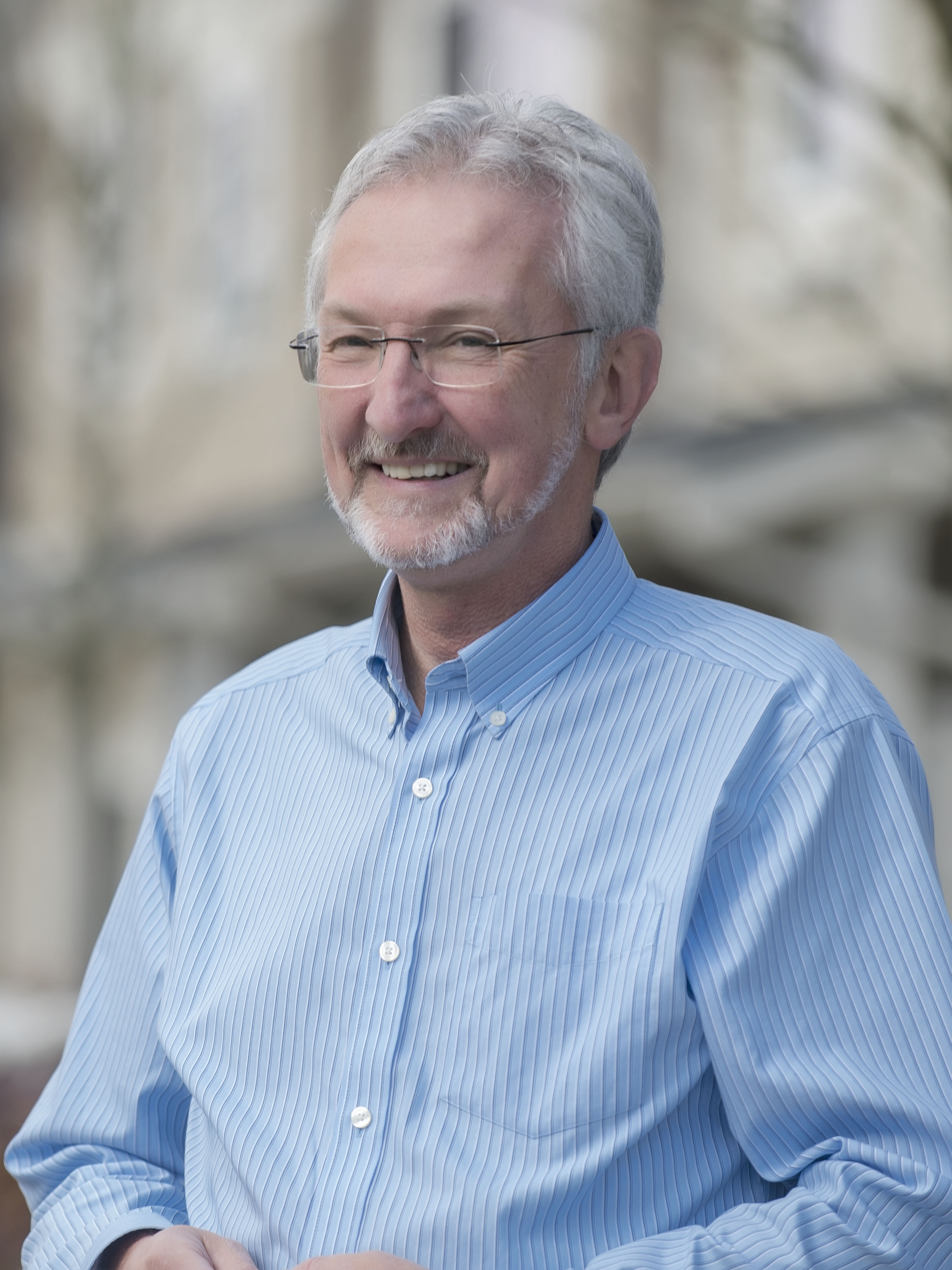

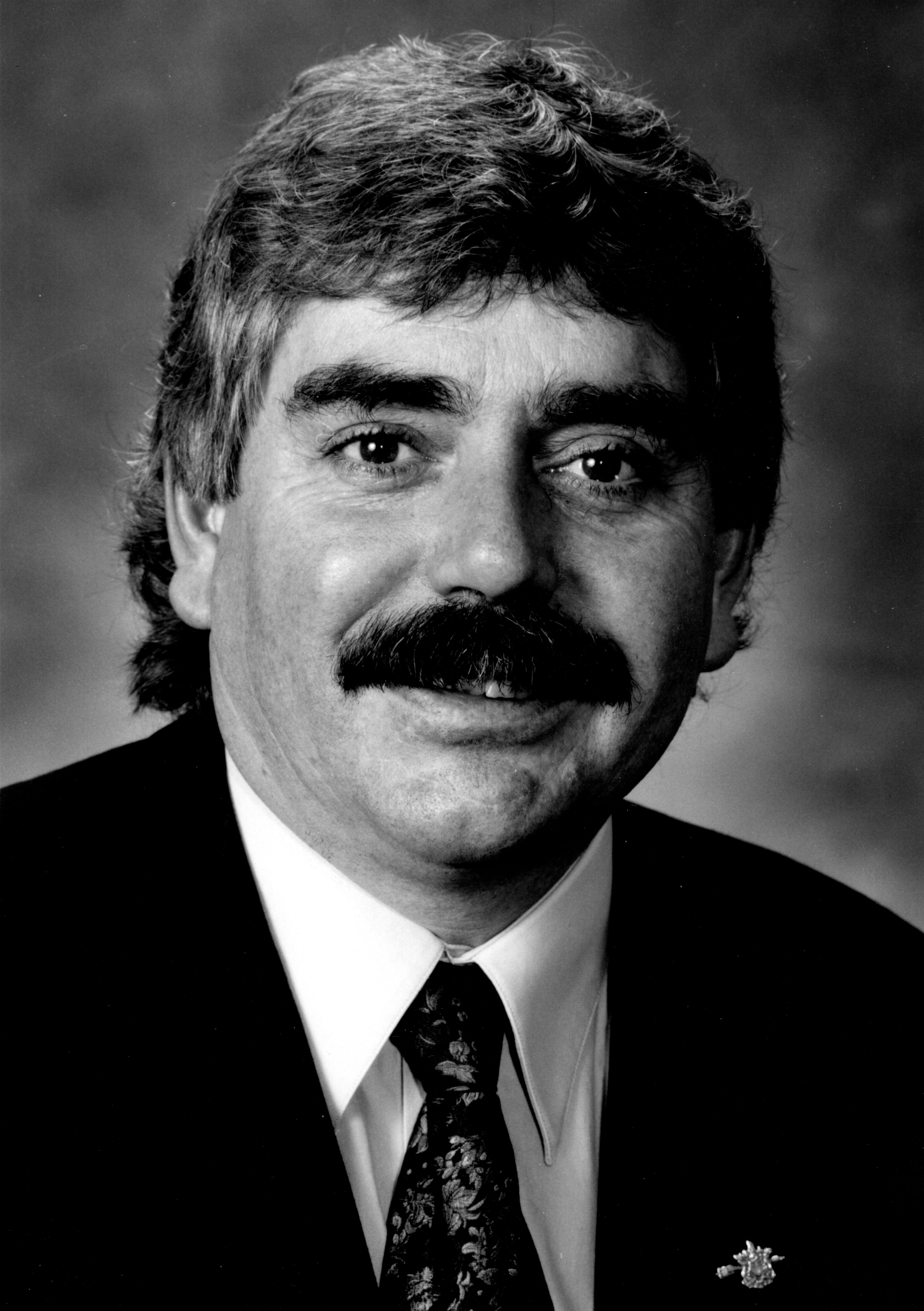
Candidate	Carole James	Leonard Krog
Final ballot	395 (50.90%)	219 (28.22%)
First ballot	325 (41.94%)	150 (19.35%)
Candidate	Nils Jensen	Steve Orcherton
Final ballot	162 (20.88%)	Eliminated
First ballot	169 (21.81%)	87 (11.23%)
Leader before election
Joy MacPhail (interim)
Elected Leader
Carole James

2003 British Columbia New Democratic Party leadership election
- Date: November 23, 2003
- Resigning leader: Ujjal Dosanjh
- Won by: Carole James
- Ballots: 2
- Candidates: 6

The 2003 British Columbia New Democratic Party leadership election was held on November 23, 2003, to elect a successor to Ujjal Dosanjh as leader of the British Columbia New Democratic Party (BC NDP). The election was necessary because Dosanjh had left the BC NDP following the party's defeat in the 2001 provincial election; leaving Joy MacPhail as interim leader. Carole James won on the second ballot, defeating Leonard Krog.

== Background ==
Following the 2001 provincial election, the BC NDP had been reduced from 39 to 2 seats in the Legislative Assembly of British Columbia. Neither of the BC NDP's two MLAs, Jenny Kwan and Joy MacPhail, expressed interest in running for leadership.

The candidates reflected a wide range of ideological positions within the party. Nils Jensen, a municipal councillor from Oak Bay, was a proponent of the centrist Third Way movement. Both Leonard Krog and Steve Orcherton represented more traditional elements of the party, with Orcherton being perceived as the most left-wing candidate on the ballot. James presented a relatively ideologically ambiguous position, neither as centrist as Jensen or leftist as Orcherton, but generally social democratic.

== Candidates ==
=== Peter Dimitrov ===
Dimitrov was a lawyer from Vancouver.

=== Carole James ===
James was the chair of the Greater Victoria School Board, where she was a trustee from 1990 to 2001. She was also the BC NDP candidate for Victoria-Beacon Hill in the 2001 election, where she had lost by only 35 votes. Before entering politics, she worked as a social worker.

Endorsements

- MPs: (2) Libby Davies (Vancouver East); Svend Robinson (Burnaby—Douglas)
- MLAs: (1) Jenny Kwan (Vancouver-Mount Pleasant)
- Unions: (2) Canadian Union of Public Employees; British Columbia General Employees' Union

=== Nils Jensen ===
Jensen was a member of Oak Bay Municipal Council from 1996 to 2011. Before entering politics, he was a lawyer and professor at the University of Victoria.

Endorsements

- Unions: (2) International Woodworkers of America; United Steelworkers

=== Leonard Krog ===
Krog was the Member of the Legislative Assembly (MLA) for Parksville-Qualicum from 1991 to 1996. He was also the BC NDP candidate for Nanaimo in the 2001 election. Before entering politics, he worked as a lawyer.

Endorsements

- Former leaders: (1) Dave Barrett (1969–1984)

=== Mehdi Najari ===
Najari was a book seller from Victoria.

=== Steve Orcherton ===
Orcherton was the Member of the Legislative Assembly (MLA) for Victoria-Hillside from 1996 to 2001. Before entering politics, he was secretary-treasurer of Victoria Labour Council and a cook.

== Ballot results ==
First Ballot
Candidate	Votes	Percentage
Carole James	325	41.91
Nils Jensen	169	21.81
Leonard Krog	150	19.35
Steve Orcherton	87	11.23
Mehdi Najari	32	4.13
Peter Dimitrov	12	1.55
Total	775	100.00

Second Ballot
Candidate	Weighted Votes	Percentage	+/-
Carole James	395	50.90	+8.96
Leonard Krog	219	28.22	+8.87
Nils Jensen	162	20.88	–0.93
Total	776	100.00	
