= Kris McNichol =

Canadian politician

Personal details
- Party: Conservative (federal); Conservative (provincial)
- Website: website

Kris McNichol MLA is a Canadian politician who is the member-elect of the Legislative Assembly of British Columbia for Ladysmith-Oceanside since the 2026 British Columbia general election. At the 2025 Canadian federal election, he was the Conservative Party of Canada candidate for Courtenay—Alberni, but was not elected.

McNichol is a small business owner.

== Electoral record ==
2026 British Columbia general election: Ladysmith-Oceanside
** Preliminary results — Not yet official **
Party	Candidate	Votes	%	±%	Expenditures
New Democratic	Stephanie Higginson	13,936	44.46		
Conservative	Kris McNichol	13,876	44.27		
Green	Charlene Smylie	3,490	11.14		
Total valid votes		31,302			
Total rejected ballots		40			
Turnout					
Registered voters					
New Democratic hold		Swing			
Source: Elections BC

2025 Canadian federal election: Courtenay—Alberni
Party	Candidate	Votes	%	±%	Expenditures
New Democratic	Gord Johns	31,617	39.64	–3.24	$107,752.57
Conservative	Kris McNichol	28,028	35.14	+3.84	$98,868.84
Liberal	Brian Cameron	18,078	22.66	+9.05	$48,661.26
Green	Chris Markevich	1,352	1.70	–5.36	
People's	Thomas Gamble	427	0.54	–4.47	$3,486.49
Animal Protection	Teresa Knight	195	0.24	–	$3,570.37
Christian Heritage	Jesse Musial	69	0.09	–	$306.25
Total valid votes/expense limit		79,766	99.54	–	$152,320.49
Total rejected ballots		367	0.46	+0.15	
Turnout		80,133	73.85	+8.49	
Eligible voters		108,515			
New Democratic notional hold		Swing		–3.54	
Source: Elections Canada
