= 2011 IPC Athletics World Championships – Women's 800 metres =

The women's 800 metres at the 2011 IPC Athletics World Championships was held at the QEII Stadium from 24–29 January 2011.

== Medalists ==
| Class | Gold | Silver | Bronze |
|---|---|---|---|
| T11 | Miroslava Sedlackova; Czech Republic | Maritza Arango Buitrago; Colombia | Zakia Torech; Tunisia |
| T52 | Kerry Morgan; United States | Michelle Stilwell; Canada | Teruyo Tanaka; Japan |
| T53 | Amanda McGrory; United States | Zhou Hongzhuan; China | Jessica Galli; United States |
| T54 | Tatyana McFadden; United States | Liu Wenjun; China | Diane Roy; Canada |
