= Adam Walker (Canadian politician) =

Canadian politician (born 1983/84)

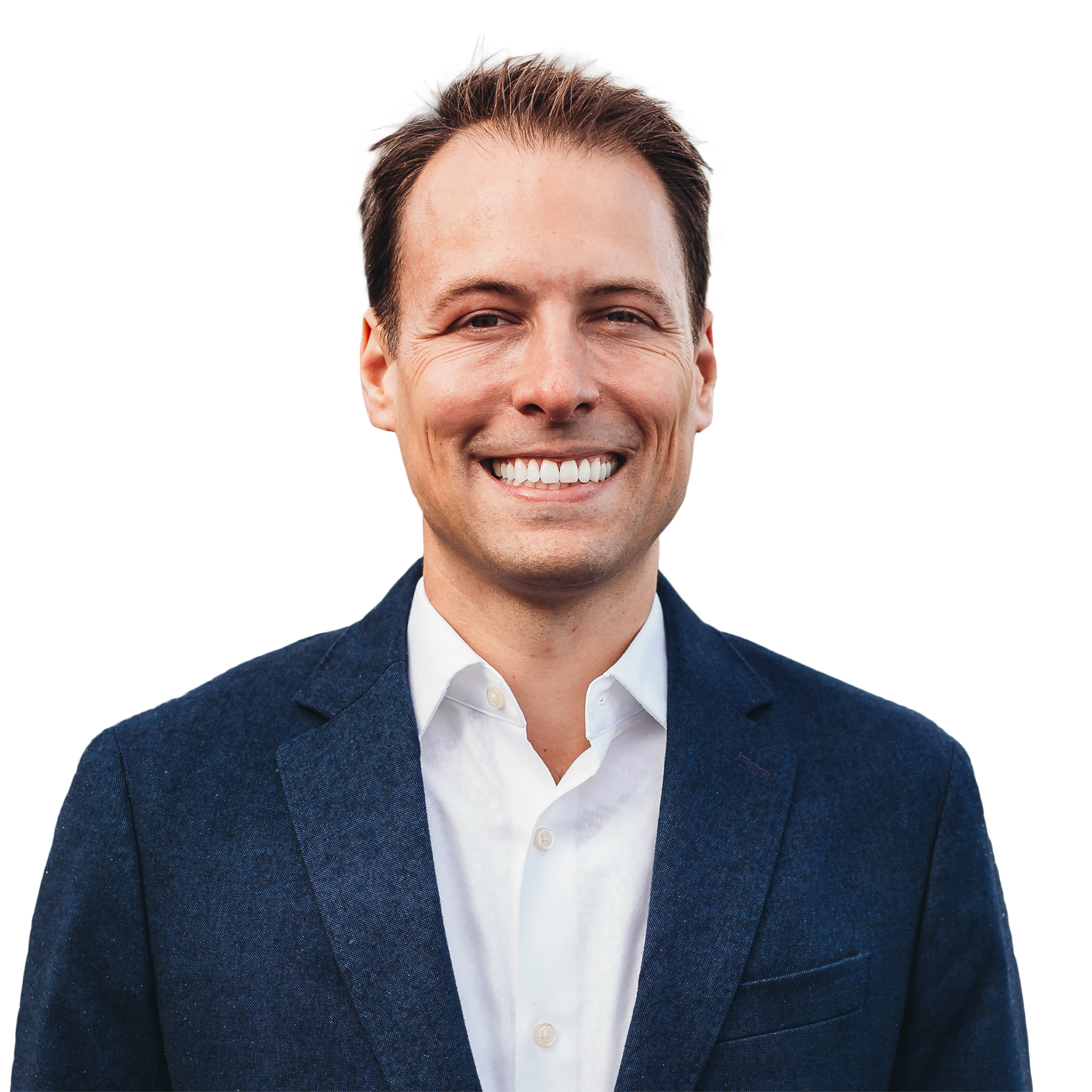
- Walker in 2020

Parliamentary Secretary for Sustainable Economy of British Columbia
- In office November 26, 2020 – September 21, 2023
- Premier: John Horgan; David Eby
- Preceded by: Position established

Member of the British Columbia Legislative Assembly for Parksville-Qualicum
- In office October 24, 2020 – October 19, 2024
- Preceded by: Michelle Stilwell
- Succeeded by: Riding dissolved

Personal details
- Born: 1983 or 1984 (age 42–43) Comox, British Columbia
- Party: Independent (2023–present)
- Other political affiliations: New Democratic (before 2023)
- Relations: Robert Walker (grandfather)
- Occupation: small business owner farmer

Adam Walker is a Canadian politician who was elected to the Legislative Assembly of British Columbia in the 2020 British Columbia general election. He represented the electoral district of Parksville-Qualicum as an independent until the dissolution of the district.

Born in Comox, British Columbia, Walker grew up in Qualicum Beach, where he operated a technology business. He was elected Qualicum Beach town councillor in the 2018 municipal election. After being acclaimed as the BC NDP candidate for Parksville-Qualicum in October 2020, he went on to defeat the incumbent BC Liberal member of the Legislative Assembly Michelle Stilwell in that month's provincial election to become the riding's new representative. He resigned his town council seat in November 2020, and was named Parliamentary Secretary for the New Economy by Premier John Horgan in the same month.

On December 7, 2022, he was appointed Parliamentary Secretary for Sustainable Economy by Premier David Eby.

In September 2023, he was dismissed from his position as a Parliamentary Secretary and removed from the BC NDP caucus following an internal investigation.

In the 2024 British Columbia general election, he stood as an independent candidate but was unseated by Stephanie Higginson from the NDP.

== Electoral record ==
2024 British Columbia general election: Ladysmith-Oceanside
Party	Candidate	Votes	%	±%	Expenditures
New Democratic	Stephanie Higginson	14,144	41.49	-2.6	$63,115.59
Conservative	Brett Fee	12,097	35.48	+32.4	$36,582.28
Independent	Adam Walker	5,559	16.31	–	$26,823.24
Green	Laura Ferreira	2,292	6.72	-11.9	$0.00
Total valid votes/expense limit		34,092	99.93	–	$71,700.08
Total rejected ballots		24	0.07	–	
Turnout		34,116	69.08	–	
Registered voters		49,387			
New Democratic notional hold		Swing		-17.5	
Source: Elections BC

2020 British Columbia general election: Parksville-Qualicum
Party	Candidate	Votes	%	±%	Expenditures
New Democratic	Adam Walker	13,207	42.00	+13.34	$6,991.73
Liberal	Michelle Stilwell	11,155	35.47	−9.66	$45,718.10
Green	Rob Lyon	5,227	16.62	−8.82	$2,772.94
Conservative	Don Purdey	1,404	4.46	–	$1,413.44
Independent	John St John	454	1.44	–	$0.00
Total valid votes		31,447	100.00	–	
Total rejected ballots		223	0.71	+0.22	
Turnout		31,670	64.65	-5.56	
Registered voters		48,986			
New Democratic gain from Liberal		Swing		+11.5	
Source: Elections BC
