= Ron Cantelon =

Canadian politician

Member of the British Columbia Legislative Assembly for Parksville-Qualicum Nanaimo-Parksville (2005-2009)
- In office May 17, 2005 – May 14, 2013
- Preceded by: Judith Reid
- Succeeded by: Michelle Stilwell

Personal details
- Born: 1943 or 1944 (age 82–83)
- Party: British Columbia Liberal Party

Ron Cantelon (born 1943 or 1944) is a Canadian politician, who served in the Legislative Assembly of British Columbia from 2005 to 2013. He represented the ridings of Nanaimo-Parksville from 2005 to 2009, and Parksville-Qualicum from 2009 to 2013, as a member of the BC Liberal Party caucus. He served as Minister of Agriculture and Lands from January 30, 2009 to June 10, 2009. On September 26, 2011, he was appointed Parliamentary Secretary for Seniors. On September 5, 2012, he was appointed Parliamentary Secretary for Innovation and Technology.

He first entered elected political life as a city councillor for Nanaimo City Council in 1999. Prior to this, he had sought election as a Member of Parliament as a Liberal Party of Canada candidate. He has also acted as chair of the Nanaimo Conference Centre Advisory Committee, chair of the Downtown Nanaimo Partnership, director of the Nanaimo Regional District Board and president of the Port Theatre from 1994 to 1999.

He was named one of the 125 prominent residents for Nanaimo's 125th anniversary and has won several accolades, including Citizen of the Year for Tourism Nanaimo in 1999 and Re/Max Manager of the Year for Western Canada in 1999.
