= Stephanie Higginson =

Canadian politician

Stephanie Higginson MLA
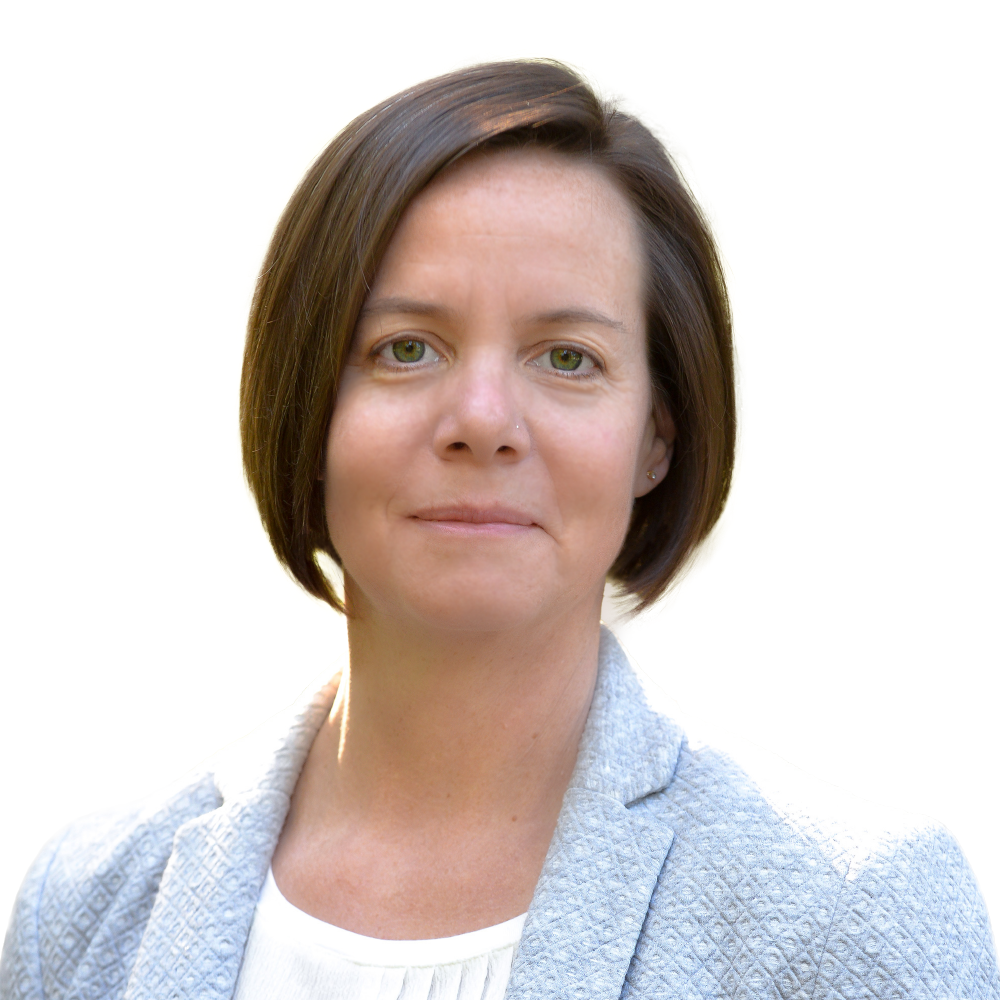
- Campaign portrait, 2024

Member of the British Columbia Legislative Assembly for Ladysmith-Oceanside
- Incumbent
- Assumed office October 19, 2024
- Preceded by: Riding established

Personal details
- Party: New Democratic
- Children: 2

Stephanie Higginson MLA is a Canadian politician who has served as a member of the Legislative Assembly of British Columbia (MLA) representing the electoral district of Ladysmith-Oceanside since 2024. She is a member of the New Democratic Party.

== Early life and career ==
Higginson lives with her husband and two children in Cedar, British Columbia. She holds a Master of Arts degree in educational studies and is a small business owner, education consultant, and former secondary school teacher.

Higginson served two terms as a school trustee in the Nanaimo-Ladysmith district, having been elected to the board of education in 2014 and 2018. During this time, she also spent three years as the president of the B.C. School Trustees' Association. She opted not to run for re-election to the board in 2022.

== Political career ==
In June 2024, it was announced that Higginson would run in the 2024 provincial election as the BC NDP candidate for the newly-created riding of Ladysmith-Oceanside. She went on to win the riding with over 40 per cent of the vote, defeating Conservative candidate Brett Fee, Green candidate Laura Ferreira, and Independent Adam Walker, the Parksville-Qualicum incumbent who was ousted from the NDP caucus in September 2023.

== Electoral history ==
2024 British Columbia general election: Ladysmith-Oceanside
Party	Candidate	Votes	%	±%	Expenditures
New Democratic	Stephanie Higginson	14,144	41.49	-2.6	$63,115.59
Conservative	Brett Fee	12,097	35.48	+32.4	$36,582.28
Independent	Adam Walker	5,559	16.31	–	$26,823.24
Green	Laura Ferreira	2,292	6.72	-11.9	$0.00
Total valid votes/expense limit		34,092	99.93	–	$71,700.08
Total rejected ballots		24	0.07	–	
Turnout		34,116	69.08	–	
Registered voters		49,387			
New Democratic notional hold		Swing		-17.5	
Source: Elections BC
