= Paul Reitsma =

Canadian politician (born 1948)

Member of the British Columbia Legislative Assembly for Parksville-Qualicum
- In office May 28, 1996 – June 23, 1998
- Preceded by: Leonard Krog
- Succeeded by: Judith Reid

Personal details
- Born: January 22, 1948 (age 78) Netherlands
- Party: British Columbia Liberal Party

Paul Reitsma (born January 22, 1948) is a former member of the Legislative Assembly of British Columbia, Canada, for the electoral district of Parksville-Qualicum.

He was born in 1948 in the Netherlands. Reitsma served as the mayor of Port Alberni and Parksville, prior to his move to provincial politics.

Reitsma was elected in the 1996 BC provincial election for the BC Liberals, defeating New Democratic Party of British Columbia incumbent Leonard Krog.

In early 1998, Reitsma was accused of writing letters to newspapers under assumed names, praising himself and attacking his political opponents. A Parksville newspaper had asked a former Royal Canadian Mounted Police handwriting expert to compare a sample of Reitsma's handwriting to that of letters to the editor submitted by a "Warren Betanko", and then ran a story entitled "MLA Reitsma is a liar and we can prove it".

Reitsma was ejected from the BC Liberal caucus although he chose to remain as a member of the BC Legislative Assembly. However, he resigned his legislative seat on June 23, 1998, when it appeared that a recall petition led by proponent Mark Robinson had enough signatures from the electorate to recall him (thus result in a by-election to elect a new MLA).
