= Ladysmith-Oceanside =

Provincial electoral district in British Columbia, Canada

British Columbia electoral district
- Interactive map of riding boundaries

Provincial electoral district
- Legislature: Legislative Assembly of British Columbia
MLA
Stephanie Higginson
New Democratic
- District created: 2023
- First contested: 2024
- Last contested: 2026

Demographics
- Population (2021): 56,308
- Area (km²): 2,127
- Pop. density (per km²): 26.5
- Census division(s): Cowichan Valley, Nanaimo
- Census subdivision(s): Ladysmith, Parksville, Qualicum Beach, Stzʼuminus

Ladysmith-Oceanside is a provincial electoral district in British Columbia that has been represented in the Legislative Assembly of British Columbia since 2024.

Created under the 2021 British Columbia electoral redistribution, the district was first contested in the 2024 general election. It was created out of parts of Parksville-Qualicum and Nanaimo-North Cowichan.

== Demographics ==
Population, 2021	56,308
Area (km^{2})	2,127
Pop. Density (people per km^{2})	26
Source: BC Electoral Boundaries Commission

== Geography ==
The district wraps around the city of Nanaimo, bringing together the town of Ladysmith and surrounding communities in the Cowichan Valley Regional District, rural areas in the inland west of the Regional District of Nanaimo, and the Oceanside region north of Greater Nanaimo, including Nanoose Bay, Parksville and Qualicum Beach. The district was controversial at its time of creation, earning criticism from some local elected officials.

== Members of the Legislative Assembly ==
This district has elected the following members of the Legislative Assembly:

Assembly	Years	Member	Party
Ladysmith-Oceanside; Riding created from Nanaimo-North Cowichan and Parksville-Qualicum
43rd	2024–2026	Stephanie Higginson	New Democratic
44th	2026–present	Stephanie Higginson	New Democratic

== Election results ==
2026 British Columbia general election
** Preliminary results — Not yet official **
Party	Candidate	Votes	%	±%	Expenditures
Conservative	Kris McNichol	13,426	44.51		
New Democratic	Stephanie Higginson	13,331	44.20		
Green	Charlene Smylie	3,366	11.16		
Total valid votes		30,123			
Total rejected ballots		40			
Turnout					
Registered voters					
Conservative gain		Swing			
Source: Elections BC

2024 British Columbia general election
Party	Candidate	Votes	%	±%	Expenditures
New Democratic	Stephanie Higginson	14,144	41.49	-2.6	$63,115.59
Conservative	Brett Fee	12,097	35.48	+32.4	$36,582.28
Independent	Adam Walker	5,559	16.31	–	$26,823.24
Green	Laura Ferreira	2,292	6.72	-11.9	$0.00
Total valid votes/expense limit		34,092	99.93	–	$71,700.08
Total rejected ballots		24	0.07	–	
Turnout		34,116	69.08	–	
Registered voters		49,387			
New Democratic notional hold		Swing		-17.5	
Source: Elections BC

2020 provincial election redistributed results
Party	%
New Democratic	44.1
Liberal	32.7
Green	18.6
Conservative	3.1
Independent	1.5

== See also ==
- List of British Columbia provincial electoral districts
- Canadian provincial electoral districts
