= School District 69 Qualicum =

School district in British Columbia, Canada

Location
- Parksville Parksville, Qualicum Beach on Vancouver Island Canada
- Coordinates: @49.3486704,-124.4007942,16.47z

District information
- Superintendent: Mr. Peter Jory
- Schools: 13
- Budget: CA$48 million

Students and staff
- Students: 4500

Other information
- Website: www.sd69.bc.ca

School District 69 Qualicum is a school district on central Vancouver Island in British Columbia. This includes the major centres of Parksville and Qualicum Beach.

== Schools ==
School	Location	Grades
Arrowview Elementary School	Qualicum Beach	K-7
Bowser Elementary School	Bowser	K-7
École Oceanside Elementary School	Parksville	K-7
École Ballenas Secondary School	Parksville	8-12
Errington Elementary School	Errington	K-7
False Bay School	Lasqueti Island	K-9
Kwalikum Secondary School	Qualicum Beach	8-12
Nanoose Bay Elementary School	Nanoose Bay	K-7
PASS-Woodwinds Alternate School and Community Education Centre	Parksville	8-12
Qualicum Beach Elementary School	Qualicum Beach	K-7
SD 69 Collaborative Education Alternate Program	Parksville	K-12
Springwood Elementary School	Parksville	K-7

== See also ==
- List of school districts in British Columbia
