= Athletics at the 2008 Summer Paralympics – Women's 100 metres T52 =

Women's 100m T52 at the XIII Paralympic Games
- Venue: Beijing National Stadium
- Dates: 15 September
- Competitors: 8 from 5 nations
- Winning time: 19.97

Medalists
1st place, gold medalist(s)		Michelle Stilwell	Canada
2nd place, silver medalist(s)		Tomomi Yamaki	Japan
3rd place, bronze medalist(s)		Teruyo Tanaka	Japan

The women's 100m T52 event at the 2008 Summer Paralympics took place at the Beijing National Stadium on 15 September. There were no heats in this event.

== Final ==
Competed at 18:17.

Rank	Name	Nationality	Time	Notes
1st place, gold medalist(s)	Michelle Stilwell	Canada	19.97	WR
2nd place, silver medalist(s)	Tomomi Yamaki	Japan	21.00	
3rd place, bronze medalist(s)	Teruyo Tanaka	Japan	21.33	
4	Pia Schmid	Switzerland	21.53	
5	Kerri Morgan	United States	21.56	
6	Mallerie Badgett	United States	24.01	
7	Cheryl Leitner	United States	24.40	
8	Gemma Buchholz	Australia	24.64	

WR = World Record.
