= Mark Allan Robinson =

Canadian politician (born 1975)

Mark Robinson

Personal details
- Born: January 20, 1975 (age 51) Penticton, BC
- Occupation: Community support worker

Mark Allan Robinson (born January 20, 1975) was the proponent of the first recall petition in Canadian history that reached the required threshold to remove an elected politician. The recall petition was to force a by-election in the riding that Paul Reitsma represented. While the threshold was met, Reitsma resigned before it was made official.

Mark Robinson was born in Penticton, BC and moved to Nanaimo, BC at a young age. He has been politically active from the age of 18, sitting on various local government committees and boards of directors for non-profit organizations. For over ten years during the 2000s, he taught ESL. Since then, he has worked as a front-line community support worker. He is a single father with three daughters.

In the 1996 British Columbia general election, Robinson ran as a candidate for the Green Party in the Parksville-Qualicum riding. More recently, on October 15, 2022, he was elected as a school trustee for the School District 68 Nanaimo-Ladysmith.

== 1998 recall election ==
In the spring of 1998, Paul Reitsma, a Member of the Legislative Assembly (MLA) for the BC Liberal Party in the Parksville-Qualicum riding, had been caught by Cam Purdy, editor of local Parksville newspaper, Parksville/Qualicum Beach Morning Sun, writing letters to the editor for years praising himself and signing them under fabricated names, such as "Warren Betanko". As a result, the Liberals removed Reitsma from their caucus, but he remained as an independent.

Mark Robinson initiated a recall election to force a by-election in the Parksville-Qualicum riding. He organized 194 registered canvassers and volunteers to go door-to-door collecting signatures. Just over 17,000 signatures from eligible voters were required to be gathered between April 15 to June 15 for the recall campaign to be successful.

On June 15, 1998, Mark Robinson presented the petition to Elections BC with over 25,000 signatures. Signatures were verified by Elections BC between June 15 and June 23. Achieving the required 17,020 verified signatures, an announcement was to be made that the recall petition had enough signatures to call a by-election. Just prior to the announcement on June 23, Reitsma resigned his seat in the British Columbia Legislative Assembly after being tipped off about the overwhelming success of the petition to recall him. Had he not resigned, he would have become the first politician in the British Commonwealth to be recalled.

With the seat vacant, a by-election was called for later that year on December 14. Judith Reid of the BC Liberals won the seat with over 50% of the vote.

== See also ==
- History of British Columbia
- 1996 British Columbia general election
