= Tomomi Yamaki =

Japanese Paralympic athlete

Medal record

Paralympic athletics

Representing Japan

Paralympic Games
Silver medal – second place	2008 Beijing	100m - T52
Silver medal – second place	2008 Beijing	200m - T52

Tomomi Yamaki (八巻 智美, Yamaki Tomomi) is a Paralympian athlete from Japan competing mainly in category T52 sprint events.

She competed in the 2008 Summer Paralympics in Beijing, China. There she won a silver medal in the women's 100 metres - T52 event and a silver medal in the women's 200 metres - T52 event
