= Oceanside, British Columbia =

Coordinates: 49.366°N 124.539°W

Oceanside is a name adopted for a group of communities on the eastern coast of Vancouver Island in British Columbia, Canada. It is part of the Regional District of Nanaimo and includes the City of Parksville and the Town of Qualicum Beach as well as the unincorporated communities of Nanoose Bay, Coombs, Errington, French Creek, Bowser, Deep Bay, Qualicum Bay and a few other smaller centres. The area is promoted by Parksville Qualicum Beach Tourism Association.

== Politics ==
The region is covered by the Ladysmith-Oceanside district for elections to the Legislature of British Columbia.
