= Parksville-Qualicum =

Former provincial electoral district in British Columbia, Canada

British Columbia electoral district

Defunct provincial electoral district
- Legislature: Legislative Assembly of British Columbia
- District created: 1990
- District abolished: 2001
- District re-created: 2009
- District re-abolished: 2024
- First contested: 1991
- Last contested: 2020

Demographics
- Population (2015): 54,089
- Area (km²): 978

Parksville-Qualicum was a former provincial electoral district in the Canadian province of British Columbia in use from 1991 to 2001 and again from 2009 to 2024. The riding consisted of the city of Parksville, the town of Qualicum Beach and the communities of Lantzville and Nanoose Bay.

It was first contested in the 1991 election. Following redistribution, the area became part of the Nanaimo-Parksville and Alberni-Qualicum ridings. It was re-created prior to the 2009 general election, and was won by Liberal, Ron Cantelon. Under the 2021 resistribution that took effect for the 2024 election, a substantial reorganization of electoral boundaries in the Nanaimo and mid-Island area saw Parksville-Qualicum dissolved, with the majority of its territory and population being added to Ladysmith-Oceanside while Lantzville and the portion of the City of Nanaimo in the district joined Nanaimo-Lantzville.

== Demographics ==
Population (2015)	54,089
Area (km^{2})	978
Pop. density (people per km^{2})	55.3

== MLAs ==
Assembly	Years	Member	Party
Parksville-Qualicum
35th	1991–1996	Leonard Krog	New Democratic
36th	1996–1998	Paul Reitsma	Liberal
36th	1998–2001	Judith Reid	Liberal
Riding redistributed into Nanaimo-Parksville
39th	2009–2013	Ron Cantelon	Liberal
40th	2013–2017	Michelle Stilwell	Liberal
41st	2017–2020	Michelle Stilwell	Liberal
42nd	2020–2023	Adam Walker	New Democratic
42nd	2023–2024	Adam Walker	Independent

== Electoral history ==
2020 election results by polling area

2020 British Columbia general election
Party	Candidate	Votes	%	±%	Expenditures
New Democratic	Adam Walker	13,207	42.00	+13.34	$6,991.73
Liberal	Michelle Stilwell	11,155	35.47	−9.66	$45,718.10
Green	Rob Lyon	5,227	16.62	−8.82	$2,772.94
Conservative	Don Purdey	1,404	4.46	–	$1,413.44
Independent	John St John	454	1.44	–	$0.00
Total valid votes		31,447	100.00	–	
Total rejected ballots		223	0.71	+0.22	
Turnout		31,670	64.65	-5.56	
Registered voters		48,986			
New Democratic gain from Liberal		Swing		+11.5	
Source: Elections BC

2017 British Columbia general election
Party	Candidate	Votes	%	±%	Expenditures
Liberal	Michelle Stilwell	13,604	45.13	−5.00	$53,948
New Democratic	Sue Powell	9,189	28.66	−8.40	$44,326
Green	Glenn Sollitt	8,157	25.44	–	$10,490
Refederation	Terry Hand	245	0.77	–	$0
Total valid votes		32,059	100.00	–	
Total rejected ballots		159	0.49	−0.15	
Turnout		32,218	70.21	+2.27	
Registered voters		45,891			
Liberal hold		Swing		+1.70	
Source: Elections BC

2013 British Columbia general election
Party	Candidate	Votes	%	±%
Liberal	Michelle Stilwell	14,518	50.13	-1.29
New Democratic	Barry Avis	10,732	37.06	-0.94
Conservative	David Bernard Coupland	3,710	12.81	–
Total valid votes		28,960	100.00	–
Total rejected ballots		186	0.64	+0.15
Turnout		29,146	67.94	+2.24
Registered voters		42,898		
Liberal hold		Swing		-1.11
Source: Elections BC

2009 British Columbia general election
Party	Candidate	Votes	%	±%
Liberal	Ron Cantelon	13,716	51.42	0.00
New Democratic	Leanne Salter	10,136	38.00	-0.65
Green	Wayne Osborne	2,573	9.64	+1.20
Refederation	Bruce Ryder	251	0.94	+0.06
Total valid votes		26,676	100.00	
Total rejected ballots		131	0.49	
Turnout		26,807	65.70	
Eligible voters		40,805		
Liberal hold		Swing		+0.65

2005 British Columbia general election
Party	Candidate	Votes	%	±%
Liberal	Ron Cantelon	15,799	51.42	-11.18
New Democratic	Carol McNamee	11,854	38.65	+17.54
Green	Jordan Ellis	2,542	8.44	-1.87
Refederation	Bruce Ryder	280	0.88	–
Marijuana	Richard Payne	184	0.61	-1.67
Total valid votes		32,169	100.00	
Total rejected ballots		127	0.39	
Turnout		26,807	69.56	
Eligible voters		46,428		
Liberal hold		Swing		-14.36

2001 British Columbia general election
Party	Candidate	Votes	%	±%	Expenditures
Liberal	Judith Reid	17,356	62.60	+9.99	$38,337
New Democratic	Jamie Brennan	5,852	21.11	-1.58	$11,643
Green	Phil Carson	3,192	11.51	+9.77	$1,643
Unity	Daniel Stelmacker	693	2.50	-3.42	$1,992
Marijuana	Leonard Martin Melman	634	2.28	–	$505
Total valid votes		27,727	100.00		
Total rejected ballots		105	0.38		
Turnout		27,832	74.94		
Liberal hold		Swing		+5.79	

British Columbia provincial by-election, December 14, 1998 Resignation of Paul Reitsma (June 23, 1998)
Party	Candidate	Votes	%	±%	Expenditures
Liberal	Judith Reid	13,862	52.61	+11.42	$80,746
New Democratic	Leonard Krog	5,978	22.69	-17.03	$51,078
Progressive Democrat	Bruce Hampson	3,585	13.61	+8.50	$32,872
Reform	Roger Rocan	1,560	5.92	-6.19	$13,303
Green	Stuart Parker	458	1.74	+0.45	$100
Independent	Brunie Brunie	419	1.67	–	$650
Independent	Bruce Ryder	163	0.62	–	$106
Independent	Les Blank	136	0.51	–	$923
Family Coalition	Mary Elinor Moreau	94	0.35	–	$1,849
British Columbia Party	John Motiuk	74	0.28	–	$9,988
Total valid votes/expense limit		26,349	100.0	–	
Total rejected ballots		55	0.38		
Turnout		26,404	60.09		
Liberal hold		Swing		+14.22	
By-election due to the resignation of Paul Reitsma
Source(s) "December 14, 1998 By-election" (PDF). Legislative Assembly of British Columbia. December 14, 1998.

1996 British Columbia general election
Party	Candidate	Votes	%	±%
Liberal	Paul Reitsma	13,459	41.19	+5.90
New Democratic	Leonard Krog	12,976	39.72	-0.52
Reform	Teunis Westbroek	5,846	12.11	–
Progressive Democrat	Garner Stone	1,669	5.11	–
Green	Mark Robinson	422	1.29	+0.12
Natural Law	Cliff Brown	110	0.34	–
Common Sense	David Martin	81	0.24	–
Total valid votes		32,672	100.00	
Total rejected ballots		143	0.44	
Turnout		32,815	77.12	
Liberal gain from New Democratic		Swing		+3.21

1991 British Columbia general election
Party	Candidate	Votes	%	Expenditures
New Democratic	Leonard Krog	10,408	40.24	$47,385.69
Liberal	William J. Patrick	9,128	35.29	$4,703.30
Social Credit	Janet Crapo	5,846	22.60	$67,722.89
Green	Ernie Yacob	303	1.17	$$596.50
Family Coalition	Augustine J. Cunningham	180	0.70	$439.00
Total valid votes		25,863	100.00	
Total rejected ballots		398		
Turnout		26,261	79.24	

== Sources ==
- Elections BC Historical Returns
