= Nanaimo-Parksville =

Defunct provincial electoral district in British Columbia, Canada

Nanaimo-Parksville was a provincial electoral district for the Legislative Assembly of British Columbia, Canada from 2001 to 2009.

== Demographics ==
Population, 2001	56,076
Population Change, 1996–2001	8.2%
Area (km^{2})	240.43
Pop. Density (people per km^{2})	233

== History ==
=== 1999 redistribution ===
Nanaimo-Parksville created from parts of Nanaimo and Parksville-Qualicum electoral districts.

== Member of the Legislative Assembly ==
It was represented by MLA, Ron Cantelon, a former city councillor for Nanaimo. He was elected in the 2005. He represented the British Columbia Liberal Party.

== Election results ==
B.C. General Election 2005 Initial Count: Nanaimo-Parksville
Party	Candidate	Votes	%	±%
Liberal	Ron Cantelon	15,797	51.53%	
NDP	Carol McNamee	11,854	38.67%	
Green	Jordan Ellis	2,542	8.29%	–
Refederation	Bruce Ryder	275	0.90%	–
Marijuana	Richard Payne	188	0.61%	
Total		30,656	100.00%	

B.C. General Election 2001: Nanaimo-Parksville
Party	Candidate	Votes	%	±	Expenditures
Liberal	Judith Reid	17,356	62.60%		$38,337
NDP	Jamie Brennan	5,852	21.11%		$11,643
Green	Phil Carson	3,192	11.51%	–	$1,643
Unity	Daniel Stelmacker	693	2.50%		$1,992
Marijuana	Leonard Martin Melman	634	2.28%		$505
Total valid votes		27,727	100.00%		
Total rejected ballots		105	0.38%		
Turnout		27,832	74.94%		
