= Teruyo Tanaka =

Japanese Paralympic athlete

Personal information
- Born: 24 May 1959 (age 67) Gifu, Japan

Sport
- Sport: Paralympic athletics
Medal record
Paralympic athletics
Representing Japan
Paralympic Games
Gold medal – first place	1996 Atlanta	800m T51
Silver medal – second place	2000 Sydney	200m T52
Silver medal – second place	2000 Sydney	800m T52
Silver medal – second place	2000 Sydney	1500m T52
Bronze medal – third place	2008 Beijing	100m T52
World Championships
Gold medal – first place	1998 Birmingham	200m T53
Gold medal – first place	2017 London	100m T52
Gold medal – first place	2017 London	400m T52
Gold medal – first place	1998 Birmingham	800m T53
Silver medal – second place	1998 Birmingham	1500m T53
Silver medal – second place	2019 Dubai	100m T52
Bronze medal – third place	2011 Christchurch	100m T52
Bronze medal – third place	2011 Christchurch	200m T52
Bronze medal – third place	2011 Christchurch	400m T52
Bronze medal – third place	2011 Christchurch	800m T52
Asian Para Games
Gold medal – first place	2018 Jakarta	100m T52

Teruyo Tanaka (田中 照代, Tanaka Teruyo) (born 24 May 1959) is a Paralympian athlete from Japan competing mainly in category T52 sprint events.

She competed in the 1996 Summer Paralympics in Atlanta, United States. There she won a gold medal in the women's 800 metres T51, finished sixth in the women's 200 metres T51 and finished sixth in the women's 400 metres T51. She also competed at the 2000 Summer Paralympics in Sydney, Australia. There she won a silver medal in the women's 200 metres T52, a silver medal in the women's 800 metres T52 and a silver medal in the women's 1500 metres T52. She also competed at the 2008 Summer Paralympics in Beijing, China. There she won a bronze medal in the women's 100 metres T52 and finished fourth in the women's 200 metres T52.
