= Judith Reid =

Canadian politician

Member of the British Columbia Legislative Assembly for Nanaimo-Parksville Parksville-Qualicum (1998-2001)
- In office December 14, 1998 – May 17, 2005
- Preceded by: Paul Reitsma
- Succeeded by: Ron Cantelon

Personal details
- Born: 1954 or 1955 (age 71–72)
- Party: British Columbia Liberal Party
- Occupation: Farmer

Judith Reid (born 1954 or 1955) is a politician in British Columbia, Canada. She is a former Liberal Party Member of the Legislative Assembly (MLA), and was Minister of Transportation for 3 years.

First elected in a 1998 by-election for Parksville-Qualicum, Reid was re-elected in the 2001 general election as MLA for Nanaimo-Parksville. From June 2001 to January 2004, she served as BC's Minister of Transportation. Her term was marked by the controversial 2003 lease of BC Rail assets and right-of-way to Canadian National Railway.

Reid did not run for re-election in 2005.

An entrepreneur, Reid has worked on several business ventures, including development of a shellfish farm on Vancouver Island. She served on the executive of the BC Shellfish Growers Association.

Reid has four sons and four grandchildren. She home-schooled her children for some of their school years.
