= Ballenas Secondary School =

Coordinates: 49.322°N 124.339°W

Location
- 135 North Pym Road; Parksville, British Columbia, V9P 2H4; Canada

Information
- School type: Public secondary school
- Motto: Building Successful Students
- School board: School District No. 69 Qualicum
- Principal: Trish Cathrine
- Grades: 8-12
- Language: English, French
- Colours: Blue & White
- Team name: Whalers
- Website: sd69.bc.ca/school/BSS

Ballenas Secondary School, or École Secondaire Ballenas is a public secondary school in Parksville, British Columbia. The school's Whalebone Theatre attracts audiences from around the Oceanside area, and is part of School District 69 Qualicum.

Ballenas offers French Immersion as well as individual French and Spanish language courses for students. Other programs at Ballenas Secondary include:

- Music: Students from Grade 8-12 can participate in a number of ensembles such as guitar, choir, and concert band. Fundraising is optional but is quite active within its members.
- Sports teams such as the Ballenas Whalers football, soccer, basketball, and.
- Art
- Science Research Methods 12 is a project-based course that combines science, math, computer science and an independent research project.

It is situated in the tourist attractive city of Parksville, British Columbia, Canada.

Kwalikum Secondary and Ballenas Secondary are the two public high schools a part of School District 69. Kwalikum Secondary is located in Qualicum Beach, British Columbia.
