= Parksville, British Columbia =

Parksville
- City
- City of Parksville
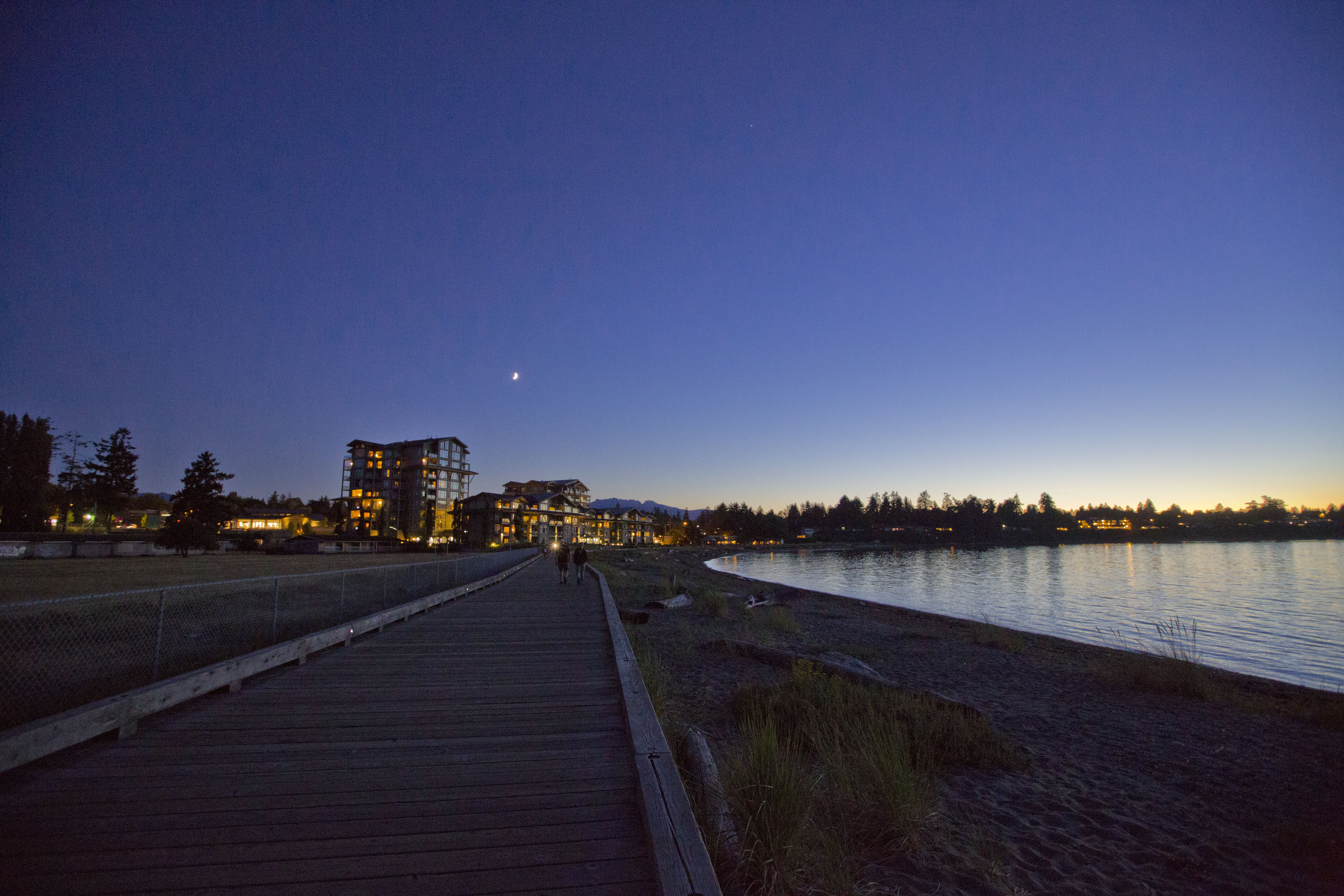

- Flag Coat of arms Heraldic badge
- Nickname: Jewel of Vancouver Island
- Location of Parksville in British Columbia Parksville (British Columbia)
- Coordinates: 49°19′16″N 124°18′49″W
- Country: Canada
- Province: British Columbia
- Regional district: Nanaimo
- Incorporated: June 19, 1945
- Town status: March 30, 1978
- City status: February 15, 1986
- Electoral districts Federal: Courtenay—Alberni
- Provincial: Ladysmith-Oceanside

Government
  - Type: Mayor-council government
  - Body: Municipal council
  - Mayor: Doug O'Brien

Area
  - City: 14.56 km^{2} (5.62 sq mi)
  - Metro: 81.86 km^{2} (31.61 sq mi)

Population (2021)
  - City: 13,642
  - Density: 939.5/km^{2} (2,433/sq mi)
  - Metro: 28,922
  - Metro density: 353.3/km^{2} (915/sq mi)
- Time zone: UTC−07:00 (PT)
- Forward Sortation Code: V9P
- Area codes: 250, 778, 236, 672
- Website: parksville.ca

Parksville is a city on Vancouver Island in British Columbia, Canada. As of the 2021 Census, Parksville's population was 13,642, representing a 9.5% increase over the 2016 Census.

Parksville is well known for its large, sandy beaches at Parksville Bay and Craig Bay. The city's best-known annual event since 1982 is a sandcastle-building competition held from mid-July to mid-August, dubbed "Parksville Beachfest". Beachfest is the only World Championship Sand Sculpting official qualification event in Canada.

Parksville is served by the coast-spanning Island Highway, the Island Rail Corridor, and a nearby airport.

== History ==
Human habitation has occurred in the area for thousands of years. Prior to Euro-Canadian settlement, the area was inhabited by several Coast Salish indigenous groups: Qualicum, Snaw-naw-as (Nanoose), and Snuneymuxw peoples.

The Spanish were the first Europeans to explore the area in 1791, followed shortly by the fleet of George Vancouver of the British Royal Navy. On Spanish maps, the Englishman River was called 'Rio de Grullas,' (River of Cranes, i.e. herons) at the site of modern-day San Pareil, while French Creek was named 'Punta de Leonardo.'

The first European landholder in the Parksville area was John Hirst, who pre-empted 120 hectares (300 acres) of land on both sides of the Englishman River in 1873, although he never relocated there from Nanaimo. The River, as it was known, remained an outpost until the turn of the 20th century when a road was built from Nanaimo.

A post office soon followed in 1877, with mail distributed from the cabin of the first postmaster, Nelson Parks, for whom the city is named.

At that time, logging was a major industry and the extension of the Esquimalt and Nanaimo (E & N) Railway in 1901, to McBride Junction spurred Parksville's growth and the beginning of a tourism boom, mainly Vancouver Islanders who travelled to Parksville to enjoy the incredible beaches.

Motels, stores, resorts and campgrounds soon followed and the community continues to prosper today. The Village of Parksville was incorporated June 19, 1945. Parksville became a town on April 1, 1978, and a city on June 1, 1981.

== Geography ==
The city lies along Highway 19A, 37 km (23 mi) northwest of Nanaimo, 48 km (30 mi) east of Port Alberni and 7 km (4 mi) kilometres southeast of Qualicum Beach. Highway 4A originates to the south of the city, before heading west to Errington and Coombs. The majority of Parksville's land base lies between Englishman River and French Creek, although a substantial portion of the city lies east of Englishman River, along the western shores of Craig Bay.

=== Climate ===
Parksville has a Csb warm-summer mediterranean climate with July and August having less than 40mm of rain.

Climate data for Parksville
Month	Jan	Feb	Mar	Apr	May	Jun	Jul	Aug	Sep	Oct	Nov	Dec	Year
Record high °C (°F)	14.4 (57.9)	16.1 (61.0)	18.9 (66.0)	24.0 (75.2)	31.5 (88.7)	30.5 (86.9)	31.1 (88.0)	31.1 (88.0)	32.0 (89.6)	23.5 (74.3)	17.8 (64.0)	16.0 (60.8)	32.0 (89.6)
Mean daily maximum °C (°F)	5.7 (42.3)	7.3 (45.1)	9.5 (49.1)	12.7 (54.9)	16.4 (61.5)	19.1 (66.4)	22.0 (71.6)	21.8 (71.2)	18.4 (65.1)	13.0 (55.4)	8.3 (46.9)	5.8 (42.4)	13.3 (55.9)
Daily mean °C (°F)	3.0 (37.4)	4.0 (39.2)	5.6 (42.1)	8.3 (46.9)	11.7 (53.1)	14.5 (58.1)	16.8 (62.2)	16.6 (61.9)	13.4 (56.1)	9.1 (48.4)	5.4 (41.7)	3.3 (37.9)	9.3 (48.7)
Mean daily minimum °C (°F)	0.3 (32.5)	0.8 (33.4)	1.6 (34.9)	3.9 (39.0)	7.0 (44.6)	9.9 (49.8)	11.6 (52.9)	11.3 (52.3)	8.4 (47.1)	5.2 (41.4)	2.4 (36.3)	0.7 (33.3)	5.2 (41.4)
Record low °C (°F)	−15.6 (3.9)	−13.0 (8.6)	−9.0 (15.8)	−2.8 (27.0)	0.0 (32.0)	2.8 (37.0)	5.0 (41.0)	4.4 (39.9)	−0.5 (31.1)	−6.0 (21.2)	−14.0 (6.8)	−14.4 (6.1)	−15.6 (3.9)
Average precipitation mm (inches)	193.4 (7.61)	163.6 (6.44)	118.1 (4.65)	68.9 (2.71)	50.9 (2.00)	47.3 (1.86)	28.0 (1.10)	36.9 (1.45)	51.7 (2.04)	137.4 (5.41)	218.0 (8.58)	199.9 (7.87)	1,314.2 (51.74)
Source: Environment Canada

== Demographics ==
In the 2021 Census of Population conducted by Statistics Canada, Parksville had a population of 13,642 living in 6,754 of its 7,105 total private dwellings, a change of 9.5% from its 2016 population of 12,453. With a land area of 14.52 km^{2} (5.61 sq mi), it had a population density of 939.5/km^{2} (2,433.4/sq mi) in 2021.

The median household income in 2006 for Parksville was $55,524, which is below the British Columbia provincial average of $62,346.

=== Ethnicity ===
Panethnic groups in the City of Parksville (1996−2021)
Panethnic group	2021		2016		2011		2006		2001		1996	
Panethnic group	Pop.	%	Pop.	%	Pop.	%	Pop.	%	Pop.	%	Pop.	%
European (Note: Statistic includes all persons that did not make up part of a visible minority or an indigenous identity.)	12,035	90.45%	10,990	91.35%	10,535	92.17%	10,130	93.8%	9,785	96.4%	8,925	96.07%
Indigenous	535	4.02%	550	4.57%	460	4.02%	360	3.33%	230	2.27%	180	1.94%
Southeast Asian (Note: Statistic includes total responses of "Filipino" and "Southeast Asian" under visible minority section on census.)	325	2.44%	155	1.29%	145	1.27%	55	0.51%	25	0.25%	25	0.27%
East Asian (Note: Statistic includes total responses of "Chinese", "Korean", and "Japanese" under visible minority section on census.)	190	1.43%	175	1.45%	165	1.44%	150	1.39%	40	0.39%	40	0.43%
South Asian	80	0.6%	90	0.75%	25	0.22%	85	0.79%	25	0.25%	35	0.38%
Latin American	60	0.45%	20	0.17%	75	0.66%	15	0.14%	20	0.2%	30	0.32%
African	30	0.23%	15	0.12%	0	0%	0	0%	10	0.1%	15	0.16%
Middle Eastern (Note: Statistic includes total responses of "West Asian" and "Arab" under visible minority section on census.)	10	0.08%	10	0.08%	0	0%	0	0%	10	0.1%	25	0.27%
Other/multiracial (Note: Statistic includes total responses of "Visible minority, n.i.e." and "Multiple visible minorities" under visible minority section on census.)	50	0.38%	20	0.17%	20	0.17%	10	0.09%	0	0%	10	0.11%
Total responses	13,305	97.53%	12,030	96.6%	11,430	95.43%	10,800	98.24%	10,150	98.32%	9,290	98.08%
Total population	13,642	100%	12,453	100%	11,977	100%	10,993	100%	10,323	100%	9,472	100%
Note: Totals greater than 100% due to multiple origin responses.

=== Religion ===
According to the 2021 census, religious groups in Parksville included:

- Irreligion (6,900 persons or 51.9%)
- Christianity (6,085 persons or 45.7%)
- Buddhism (60 persons or 0.5%)
- Judaism (35 persons or 0.3%)
- Hinduism (25 persons or 0.2%)
- Islam (10 persons or 0.1%)
- Sikhism (10 persons or 0.1%)
- Indigenous Spirituality (10 persons or 0.1%)

== Economy ==
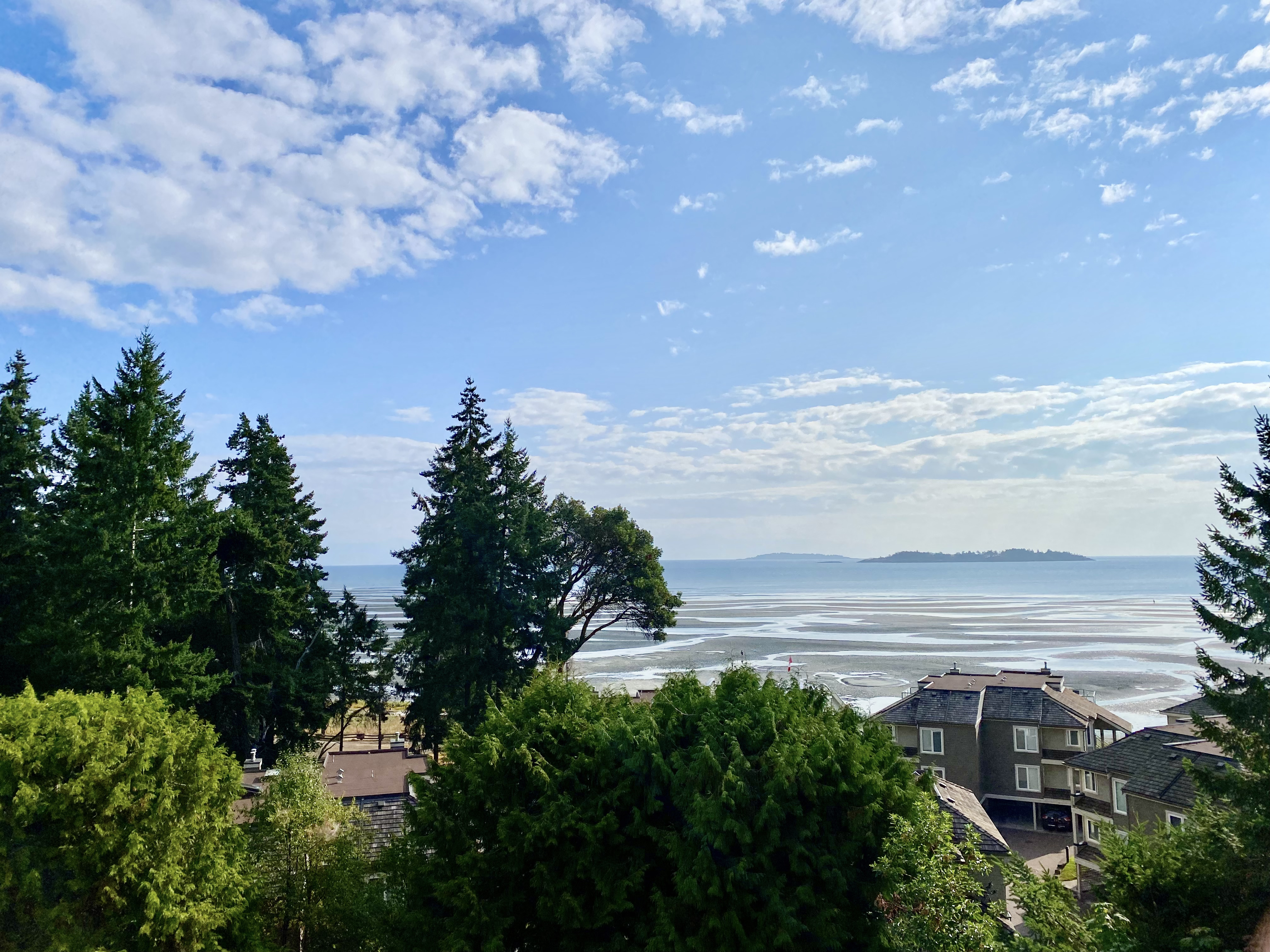
View of the beach from a resort

Tertiary sector and secondary sector jobs make up the largest part of the Parksville economy. The three largest types of occupations in Parksville are the service industry; the construction industry; and the business, financial, and administration industries. These are the largest sectors of the city's economy largely due to the summer tourism industry, and a large influx of retirees moving into the area. There is also a fair amount of primary sector industry in the surrounding areas of Parksville, primarily fishing and forestry.

There is an industrial park located in the Southeast section of the city, known as the Orange Bridge Business District, which includes many tradesman shops.

Tourism

Parksville has long been a tourist location primarily catering to people from across Vancouver Island as well as Greater Vancouver.

Parksville Beach (located at Community Park) and Rathtrevor Beach are two of the city's main attractions.

== Education ==
The City of Parksville is located within School District 69 Qualicum. Springwood Elementary, Oceanside Elementary and Ballenas Secondary School are all located within Parksville. School District 69 also operates a Continuing Education Centre, Collaborative Education Alternate Program and PASS/Woodwinds Alternate School in Parksville.

A regional campus of Vancouver Island University is located in Parksville.

== Culture, recreation, and leisure ==
=== Polar Bear Splash ===
Every year on January 1, residents gather at Parksville Community Park beach to plunge into the cold water to welcome in the new year.

=== Summer By the Sea Market ===
Each summer, Parksville holds a night market on Tuesdays. The market draws in visitors and helps to support local small businesses. In the past, the market has had up to 150 vendors. During the COVID-19 pandemic, the market was relocated to the Parksville Community Centre and the number of vendors was reduced. As of 2022, it has returned to Craig Street.

=== Canada Day Parade ===
Parksville hosts an annual Canada Day celebration. In the morning there is a parade that runs along the Island Hwy. Residents and visitors gather along the road to watch the procession and then walk down to Parksville Community Park where there are vendors, including food trucks, live music performances, some carnival attractions, and fireworks.
