= Mid Island-Pacific Rim =

Provincial electoral district in British Columbia, Canada

British Columbia electoral district
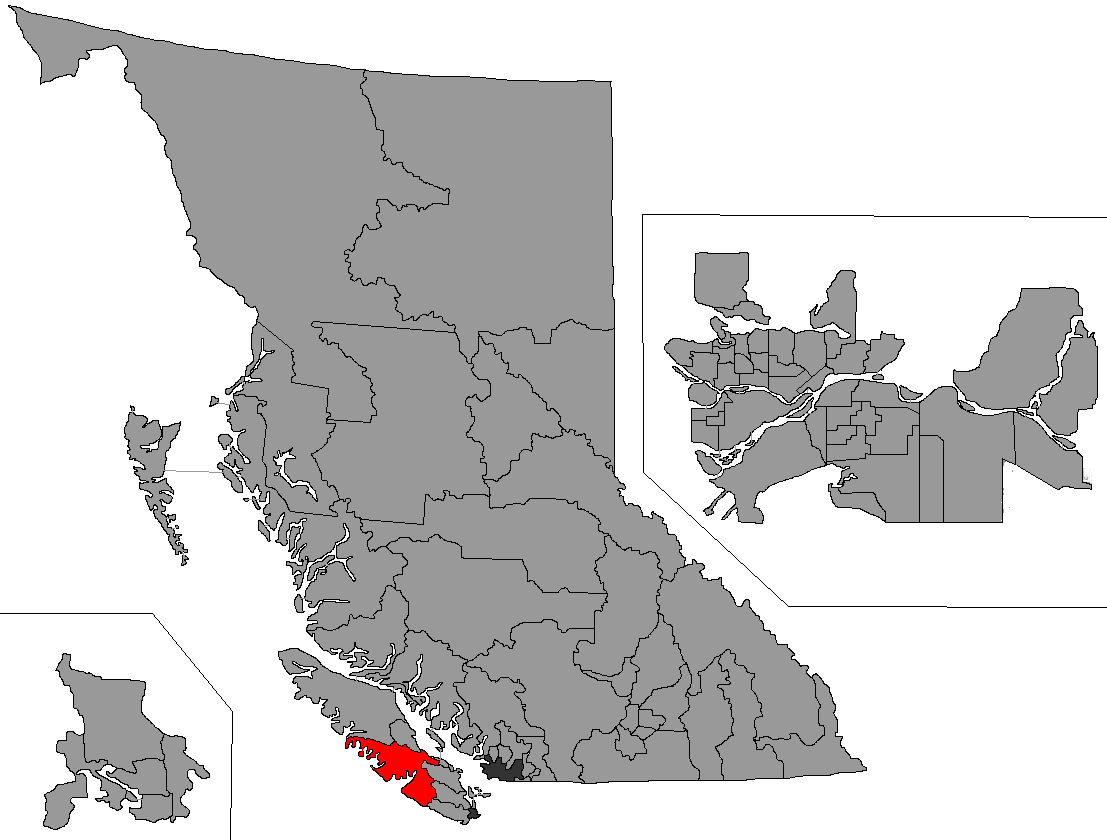
- Coordinates: 49.097°N 125.188°W

Provincial electoral district
- Legislature: Legislative Assembly of British Columbia
MLA
Josie Osborne
New Democratic
- First contested: 1963 (as Alberni)
- Last contested: 2026

Demographics
- Population (2014): 52,833
- Area (km²): 14,099
- Pop. density (per km²): 3.7

Mid Island-Pacific Rim is a provincial electoral district for the Legislative Assembly of British Columbia, Canada that was created in the 2015 redistribution from parts of Alberni-Pacific Rim and Comox Valley. It was first contested in the 2017 election.

== Demographics ==
| Population, 2014 | 52,833 |
| Area (km^{2}) | 14,099 |

== Members of the Legislative Assembly ==
| Assembly | Years | Member | Party |
|---|---|---|---|
Alberni
| 27th | 1963–1966 | Stanley John Squire | New Democratic |
| 28th | 1966–1969 | Howard Richmond McDiarmid | Social Credit |
| 29th | 1969–1972 | Howard Richmond McDiarmid | Social Credit |
| 30th | 1972–1975 | Robert Evans Skelly | New Democratic |
| 31st | 1975–1979 | Robert Evans Skelly | New Democratic |
| 32nd | 1979–1983 | Robert Evans Skelly | New Democratic |
| 33rd | 1983–1986 | Robert Evans Skelly | New Democratic |
| 34th | 1986–1988 | Robert Evans Skelly | New Democratic |
| 34th | 1988–1991 | Gerard Janssen | New Democratic |
| 35th | 1991–1996 | Gerard Janssen | New Democratic |
| 36th | 1996–2001 | Gerard Janssen | New Democratic |
Alberni-Qualicum
| 37th | 2001–2005 | Gillian Trumper | Liberal |
| 38th | 2005–2009 | Scott Fraser | New Democratic |
Alberni-Pacific Rim
| 39th | 2009–2013 | Scott Fraser | New Democratic |
| 40th | 2013–2017 | Scott Fraser | New Democratic |
Mid Island-Pacific Rim
| 41st | 2017–2020 | Scott Fraser | New Democratic |
| 42nd | 2020–2024 | Josie Osborne | New Democratic |
| 43rd | 2024–2026 | Josie Osborne | New Democratic |
| 44th | 2026–present | Josie Osborne | New Democratic |

== Election results ==
2026 British Columbia general election
| Party | Candidate | Votes | % | ±% | Expenditures |
|---|---|---|---|---|---|
| New Democratic | Josie Osborne | 11,916 | 46.80 | -1.94 | |
| Conservative | Joshua Dahling | 10,301 | 40.46 | +1.01 | |
| Green | Gracie MacDonald | 3,203 | 12.58 | +0.77 | |
| Total valid votes | | 25,420 | 99.84 | | |
| Total rejected ballots | | 42 | 0.16 | | |
| Turnout | | | | | |
| Registered voters | | | | | |
| New Democratic hold | | Swing | | -1.48 | |
Source: Elections BC

2024 British Columbia general election
| Party | Candidate | Votes | % | ±% | Expenditures |
|---|---|---|---|---|---|
| New Democratic | Josie Osborne | 14,042 | 48.74 | -9.5 | $38,708.09 |
| Conservative | Adam Hayduk | 11,366 | 39.45 | – | $6,370.06 |
| Green | Ross Reid | 3,402 | 11.81 | -8.5 | $1,487.73 |
| Total valid votes/expense limit | | 28,810 | 99.80 | – | $71,700.08 |
| Total rejected ballots | | 58 | 0.20 | – | |
| Turnout | | 28,868 | 60.37 | – | |
| Registered voters | | 47,816 | | | |
| New Democratic notional hold | | Swing | | -24.5 | |
Source: Elections BC

2020 provincial election redistributed results
| Party | % |
|---|---|
| New Democratic | 58.2 |
| Green | 20.3 |
| Liberal | 17.5 |
| Others | 4.0 |

2020 British Columbia general election
| Party | Candidate | Votes | % | ±% | Expenditures |
|---|---|---|---|---|---|
| New Democratic | Josie Osborne | 14,298 | 58.22 | +9.17 | $26,111.41 |
| Green | Evan Jolicoeur | 4,991 | 20.32 | −0.02 | $8,752.80 |
| Liberal | Helen Poon | 4,291 | 17.47 | −8.22 | $25,201.50 |
| Independent | Graham Hughes | 610 | 2.48 | – | $0.00 |
| Libertarian | Robert Alexander Clarke | 370 | 1.51 | +0.36 | $884.41 |
| Total valid votes | | 24,560 | 100.00 | – | |
| Total rejected ballots | | | | | |
| Turnout | | | | | |
| Registered voters | | | | | |
Source: Elections BC

2017 British Columbia general election
| Party | Candidate | Votes | % | Expenditures |
|---|---|---|---|---|
| New Democratic | Scott Fraser | 12,556 | 49.05 | $30,337 |
| Liberal | Darren Frank DeLuca | 6,576 | 25.69 | $61,004 |
| Green | Alicia La Rue | 5,208 | 20.34 | $2,262 |
| Conservative | Julian Fell | 878 | 3.43 | $1,818 |
| Libertarian | Robert Alexander Clarke | 294 | 1.15 | $550 |
| Refederation | Dan Cebuliak | 86 | 0.34 | $666 |
| Total valid votes | | 25,598 | 100.00 | |
| Total rejected ballots | | 119 | 0.46 | |
| Turnout | | 25,717 | 63.22 | |
| Registered voters | | 40,677 | | |
Source: Elections BC

== See also ==
- List of British Columbia provincial electoral districts
- Canadian provincial electoral districts
