= Alberni-Pacific Rim =

British Columbia electoral district

Provincial electoral district
- Legislature: Legislative Assembly of British Columbia
MLA
Scott Fraser
New Democratic
- District created: 2008
- First contested: 2009

Demographics
- Population (2006): 42,275
- Area (km²): 13,141.38
- Pop. density (per km²): 3.2
- Census division(s): Alberni–Clayoquot Regional District, Regional District of Nanaimo
- Census subdivision(s): Port Alberni, Tofino, Ucluelet

Alberni-Pacific Rim is a provincial electoral district in British Columbia, Canada, established by the Electoral Districts Act, 2008. It came into effect upon the next dissolution of the BC Legislature in April 2009. It was first contested in the 2009 election, and after a redistribution in 2015 much of the riding became Mid Island-Pacific Rim.

== Electoral history ==
2013 British Columbia general election
Party	Candidate	Votes	%
New Democratic	Scott Kenneth Fraser	10,569	57.55
Liberal	Darren Frank DeLuca	6,341	34.52
Conservative	Enid Mary Sangster-Kelly	1,456	7.93
Total valid votes		18,366	100.00
Total rejected ballots		200	1.08
Turnout		18,566	58.22
Source: Elections BC

2009 British Columbia general election
Party	Candidate	Votes	%	Expenditures
New Democratic	Scott Fraser	10,488	59.36	$46,016
Liberal	Dianne St. Jacques	5,605	31.73	$81,099
Green	Paul Musgrave	1,324	7.49	$350
Refederation	Dallas Hills	250	1.42	$1,260
Total valid votes		17,667	100	
Total rejected ballots		108	0.61	
Turnout		17,775	57.68	
