= Scott Fraser (politician) =

Canadian politician (born 1957/58)

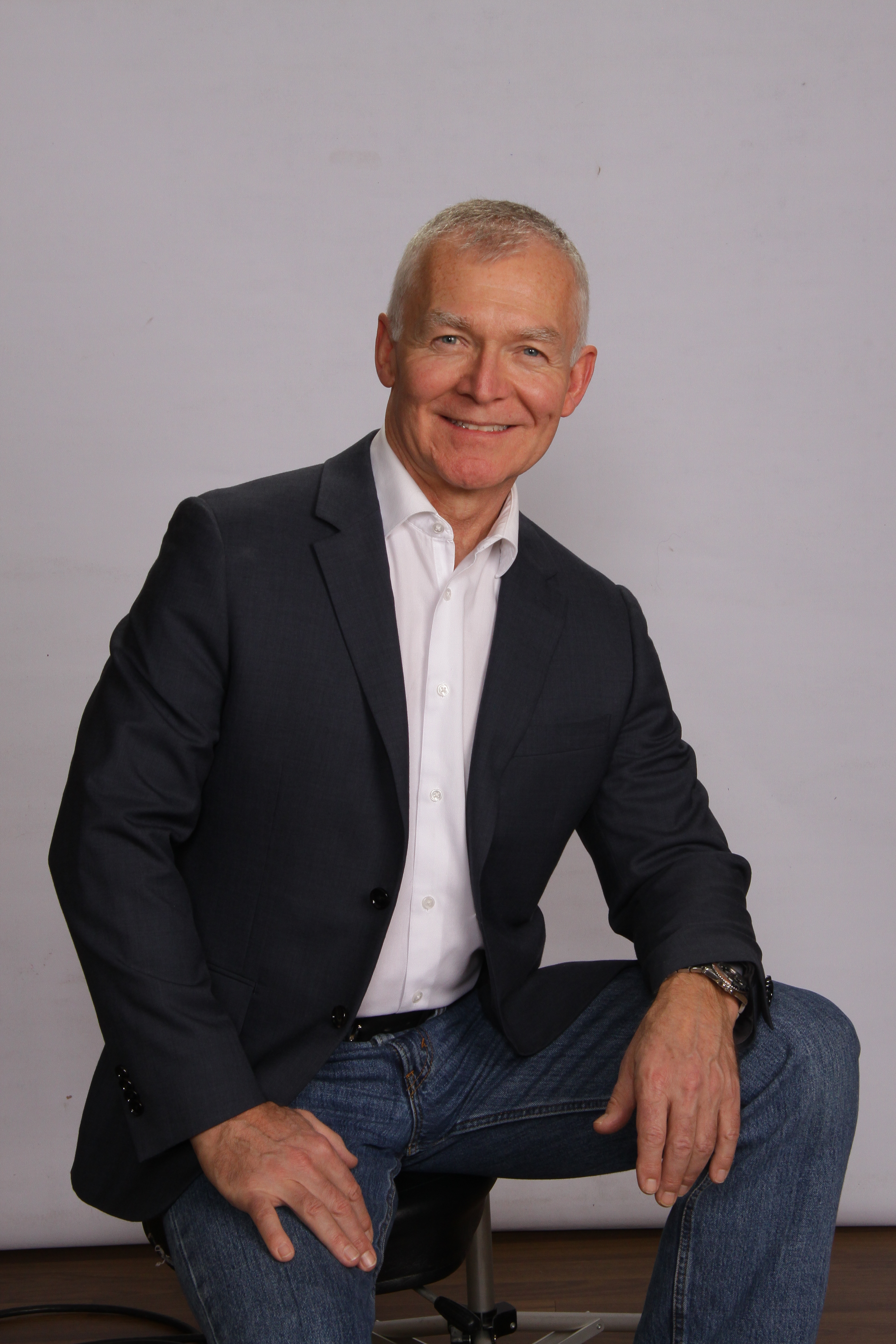
- Fraser in 2017

Minister of Indigenous Relations and Reconciliation of British Columbia
- In office July 18, 2017 – November 26, 2020
- Premier: John Horgan
- Preceded by: John Rustad
- Succeeded by: Murray Rankin

Member of the British Columbia Legislative Assembly for Mid Island-Pacific Rim (Alberni-Pacific Rim; 2009–2017) (Alberni-Qualicum; 2005–2009)
- In office May 17, 2005 – October 24, 2020
- Preceded by: Gillian Trumper
- Succeeded by: Josie Osborne

Mayor of Tofino
- In office November 1996 – November 1999

Personal details
- Born: Scott Kenneth Fraser; 1957 or 1958 (age 68–69) Ottawa, Ontario, Canada
- Party: New Democratic
- Spouse: Dolores
- Children: 1
- Occupation: Politician

Scott Kenneth Fraser (born 1957 or 1958) is a Canadian politician who represented the Mid Island-Pacific Rim electoral district in the Legislative Assembly of British Columbia from 2005 to 2020. A member of the British Columbia New Democratic Party (BC NDP), he was first elected as a Member of the Legislative Assembly (MLA) in the 2005 election, defeating one-term Liberal Party incumbent Gillian Trumper, and re-elected in the 2009, 2013 and 2017 elections. During the 41st Parliament (2017–2020) he served in the Executive Council as the Minister of Indigenous Relations and Reconciliation. In that role he led the government through adopting the Declaration on the Rights of Indigenous Peoples Act, with all party support, to implement the United Nations' Declaration on the Rights of Indigenous Peoples (UNDRIP).

As a member of the official opposition in the 38th, 39th and 40th Parliaments he served in various critic and deputy roles at different times, such as on issues relating to community and rural development, mining, fisheries, and aboriginal issues. He introduced two private member bills: the Promotion of Safe Antifreeze Act, 2007 which sought to ban ethylene glycol from antifreeze products, and the Cave Protection Act which sought to create a registry of cave sites and create legal protection for them. In both the 2011 and 2014 NDP leadership elections Fraser endorsed John Horgan.

Prior to becoming an MLA, Fraser served one term (1996–1999) as mayor of Tofino, British Columbia; before that he operated a bed and breakfast. After serving as mayor he worked as a manager at a shellfish farm. He also ran in the 2004 federal election as the New Democratic Party nominee in the Nanaimo—Alberni electoral district, but lost to the incumbent James Lunney of the Conservative Party.

== Background ==
Scott Fraser was born and raised in Ottawa, Ontario, and attended Carleton University. In 1979 he moved to Alberta and worked on the oil rigs throughout the province and in the Arctic. He eventually moved to Vancouver, British Columbia, then, in 1992, to Tofino. With his wife and young daughter, he opened a bed and breakfast business. Only four years later, Fraser became the mayor of Tofino. He was mayor from November 1996 to November 1999, a time when tourism was over-taking logging and fishing as the town's dominant industry. Fraser was supportive of the application to the United Nations to designate Clayoquot Sound as a biosphere site; Clayoquot Sound was listed as a Biosphere Reserve in 2000. Fraser was the subject of a complaint filed at the British Columbia Ombudsman by one of his councillors, Ken Gibson. The mayor and council issued a resolution stating that Gibson had violated conflict-of-interest laws, using his position on council to influence zoning restrictions on his property. Gibson challenged the resolution at the BC Supreme Court which ruled in Gibson's favour, ordering that Gibson be re-instated as a councillor. The mayor and council voted in favour of appealing the decision but the Court of Appeal upheld the decision. Fraser was defeated in his attempt at re-election as mayor. In 2000, the former mayor was appointed to Tourism BC's board of directors and to the Clayoquot Sound Central Region Board which considered pre-treaty land use-related decisions. He accepted a job as an assistant manager of the Tofino Harbour Authority and served as the chairman of the Working Sound Shellfish Committee.

As the 2004 federal election approached, Fraser expressed interest in becoming the New Democratic Party nominee for the riding of Nanaimo—Alberni. For the nomination, Fraser faced three other candidates but won on the third ballot of the preferential vote. The general election was held in June when the 46-year-old Fraser challenged incumbent James Lunney of the Conservative Party, Port Alberni councillor Hira Chopra for the Liberal Party, retired lawyer David Wright for the Green Party, Michael Mann for the Marijuana Party, retired teacher Diana Lifton for the Canadian Action Party, and Barbara Biley for the Marxist–Leninist Party. While Lunney remained the favourite to win, Fraser was viewed as making the election competitive. Lunney did win the riding with 39% of the vote while Fraser finished second with 32%.

== Provincial politics ==
Fraser did not initially put his name forward to represent the BC NDP in the 2005 provincial election, but after the NDP candidate in the Alberni-Qualicum riding withdrew, the riding association asked Fraser to stand for election. The 47-year-old Fraser, who was living in Qualicum Beach by that time, agreed. He was supported by party leader Carole James who campaigned in the riding in late-April and early-May. The incumbent, BC Liberal Gillian Trumper, sought re-election against Jack Thornburgh for the Green Party, Michael Mann for the Marijuana Party, and digital animator Jen Fisher-Bradley for Democratic Reform BC, in addition to Fraser. Fraser won with over 50% of the vote, and his party formed the official opposition to the BC Liberals who formed a majority government.

=== 38th Parliament ===
As the 38th Parliament began, Fraser opened a constituency office in Port Alberni. That city suffered heavy damage during a flooding event in November 2006 and a second office, this one in Qualicum Beach, was opened in 2007. Party leader Carole James appointed Fraser to be the BC NDP critic on aboriginal issues. He was appointed to the Select Standing Committee on Aboriginal Affairs but the committee was never convened. On aboriginal issues, Fraser supported Premier Gordon Campbell's declaration that aboriginal peoples constitute a nation, and encouraged the Premier to recognize the United Nations Declaration on the Rights of Indigenous Peoples. Fraser supported the decision to remove, from the legislature, murals depicting aboriginal people in what was seen as historically inaccurate and offensive situations. Fraser was also appointed to the Special Committee on Sustainable Aquaculture which met in the first three sessions, from November 2005 to May 2007. He was previously employed by a shellfish farm, but remained critical of open-net fish farms which interfere with wild salmon populations, like those in the Broughton Archipelago, and the measures that must be taken to control sea lice.

Fraser introduced one piece of legislation in the 38th Parliament: the Promotion of Safe Antifreeze Act (Bill M-202). The bill proposed to ban ethylene glycol, which has a pleasing taste to animals but is poisonous, from engine antifreeze sold in the province. Fraser was motivated to create the bill after his cat died of antifreeze-related poisoning. It received first reading on March 7, 2007, but later ruled out of order because it exceeded the limits of a private members bill. The bill was supported by animal welfare organizations such as the British Columbia Society for the Prevention of Cruelty to Animals, the Nature Trust of BC and Sierra Club BC, as well as several BC Liberals, including Environment Minister Barry Penner who directed ministry staff to report on implementation options. While the bill was returned for second reading, Fraser proposed a motion to add the ban on ethylene glycol in antifreeze to the Prevention of Cruelty to Animals Amendment Act being debated in March 2008, though it was voted down by the BC Liberals. The government took action on the issue in April 2009 by implementing a regulation requiring a foul-tasting agent be added to antifreeze.

On local issues, Fraser sought changes to the E&N Railway Company's pest management plan which was being reviewed by the Ministry of Environment. Specifically, he sought the removal of 2,4-D and Garlon 4 based on concerns regarding potential interaction with the local watershed. The management plan was approved by the ministry but the company agreed to replace 2,4-D. Fraser supported residents who sought to add land to MacMillan Provincial Park (Cathedral Grove), oppose developing a new parking lot there and stop logging of old growth forest adjacent to Cathedral Grove. Fraser sought provincial assistance to protect Hamilton Marsh, near Qualicum Beach, after a failed acquisition deal between the land owners, Ducks Unlimited and the Regional District of Nanaimo. Fraser joined the Bamfield Road Safety Association which lobbied the Ministry of Transportation to upgrade and better maintain Bamfield Road which had several traffic-related deaths. Fraser was a persistent critic of the Private Managed Forest Land Act, adopted in 2003 during the 37th Parliament, which enabled the province to sell parts of crown land Tree Farm Licence (TFL) to private companies and consequently, in Fraser's view, led to an increase in exports of raw logs and the idling of sawmills in BC. Fraser asked the Auditor General of BC to include a review of the removal of land from TFL 44 (the TFL in his riding) in the review of such removals under this act —- though the Auditor General declined as his mandated review specifically excluded consideration of TFL 44 and he would not conduct a separate, independent review. After it was disclosed that the BC Investment Management Corporation, which invests public funds but is independent of the government, owned 25% of the company that owned the forest land, Fraser suggested that the corporation violated its own rules on environmental and socially-ethical investments and colluded with BC Liberal donor Brookfield Asset Management, who owned 50% of the same company. In protest of the pay raises given to MLAs, Fraser donated his raise to local charities, including several scholarships for high school students in his riding entering post-secondary education.

=== 39th Parliament ===
For the 2009 provincial election Fraser's electoral district was re-arranged, removing Qualicum Beach, to create Alberni-Pacific Rim. Fraser was challenged by the former mayor of Ucluelet Dianne St. Jacques representing the BC Liberals, Paul Musgrave for the BC Green Party, and Nanaimo resident Dallas Hills for the BC Refederation Party. Fraser won his riding taking over 50% of the vote, but his party again formed the official opposition to the BC Liberals who formed their third consecutive majority government. As the 39th Parliament began, party leader Carole James reassigned Fraser to be the critic for community and rural development, though he stayed on the Select Standing Committee on Aboriginal Affairs which, like the previous parliament, was not convened. He was also appointed to the Special Committee on Cosmetic Pesticides during the 3rd and 4th sessions (2011–2012) which reviewed the potential for regulations or bans on cosmetic pesticides.

Fraser continued to advocate for improvements to Bamfield Road and protection of Hamilton marsh, even though his new riding did not cover the land, and to speak out against the BC Liberal forestry management. Fraser was a proponent of bringing new sawmill technology, developed by the German company Voith, which purported to require less than 10% of the energy required in the existing Kraft process, produce the same yields with only 25% of the pollution while being able to use pine beetle-killed logs. Negotiations took place between Voith, Catalyst Paper, and the BC government but broke down over insufficient investment commitment and guarantees, though Fraser continued to promote the technology.

Fraser introduced one piece of legislation during the 39th Parliament: Cave Protection Act, 2010 (Bill M-206). Introduced on May 27, 2010, the bill proposed to create a registry of all cave sites and enable the government to prosecute people who damage cave sites. There are several cave systems on Vancouver Island, including karst caves, which had come under threat of being damaged due to logging and mining operations.

After Bob Simpson was removed from the BC NDP caucus for publicly criticizing the party leadership, Fraser added Simpson's old role of critic of Aboriginal issues to his portfolio. As several other caucus members questioned the leadership of Carole James, Fraser remained loyal to her and was surprised when she resigned. During the subsequent leadership election, Fraser endorsed John Horgan, stating "I believe he has the best business sense, balanced by 'environment' and 'social justice.'" Adrian Dix went on to win and appointed Fraser as critic for aboriginal relations, moving the role of critic for community and rural development to Harry Lali.

=== 40th Parliament ===
The 55-year-old Fraser stood for re-election in 2013 provincial election as the BC NDP candidate but was opposed by Port Alberni realtor and guide outfitter Darren DeLuca for the BC Liberal Party and Enid Sangster-Kelly of Errington for the BC Conservatives. While DeLuca was endorsed by federal Conservative Stockwell Day, Fraser easily won the riding with over 50% of the vote. With the 40th Parliament beginning and his party again forming the official opposition, party leader Dix reassigned Fraser to be the party's critic covering rural economic development, mining and fisheries issues. Following Dix's resignation as leader, Fraser again endorsed John Horgan in the 2014 BC NDP leadership election. As in the last parliament, Fraser sponsored one piece of legislation: on May 12, 2016, he re-introduced the Cave Protection Act, 2016 (Bill M-232), though it again did not pass first reading.

=== 41st Parliament ===
Fraser ran for re-election in 2017, challenged by DeLuca for the BC Liberals again, as well as Alicia La Rue of Port Alberni for the Green Party, Regional District of Nanaimo rural director Julian Fell for the BC Conservatives, and Libertarian Robert Clarke. With DeLuca becoming involved in a controversial campaign, funded by the Safari Club, to oppose the end grizzly bear trophy hunting, Fraser again easily won re-election with nearly 50% of the vote. As the 41st Parliament began, his party again formed the Official Opposition but this time in a minority government. Party leader John Horgan appointed Fraser to be the party whip. Following the collapse of the BC Liberal government, the new Premier, John Horgan, appointed Fraser to the Executive Council of British Columbia as the Minister of Indigenous Relations and Reconciliation on July 18, 2017, with Garry Begg taking over as whip. As Minister, Fraser led two government bills through to adoption. First, the Tla'amin Final Agreement Amendment Act, 2018 made an administrative amendment to the Tla'amin Final Agreement. Second, Fraser introduced the Declaration on the Rights of Indigenous Peoples Act on October 24, 2019, and it was adopted November 28 with all party support to implement UNDRIP. In September 2020, amid speculation of a snap election, Fraser announced that he would not be seeking re-election. In the subsequent October election, the NDP retained the Mid Island-Pacific Rim seat with fellow former mayor of Tofino Josie Osborne winning the riding.

== Electoral record ==
2017 British Columbia general election: Mid Island-Pacific Rim
Party	Candidate	Votes	%	Expenditures
New Democratic	Scott Fraser	12,556	49.05	$30,337
Liberal	Darren Frank DeLuca	6,576	25.69	$61,004
Green	Alicia La Rue	5,208	20.34	$2,262
Conservative	Julian Fell	878	3.43	$1,818
Libertarian	Robert Alexander Clarke	294	1.15	$550
Refederation	Dan Cebuliak	86	0.34	$666
Total valid votes		25,598	100.00	
Total rejected ballots		119	0.46	
Turnout		25,717	63.22	
Registered voters		40,677		
Source: Elections BC

2013 British Columbia general election: Alberni-Pacific Rim
Party	Candidate	Votes	%
New Democratic	Scott Kenneth Fraser	10,569	57.55
Liberal	Darren Frank DeLuca	6,341	34.52
Conservative	Enid Mary Sangster-Kelly	1,456	7.93
Total valid votes		18,366	100.00
Total rejected ballots		200	1.08
Turnout		18,566	58.22
Source: Elections BC

2009 British Columbia general election: Alberni-Pacific Rim
Party	Candidate	Votes	%	Expenditures
New Democratic	Scott Fraser	10,488	59.36	$46,016
Liberal	Dianne St. Jacques	5,605	31.73	$81,099
Green	Paul Musgrave	1,324	7.49	$350
Refederation	Dallas Hills	250	1.42	$1,260
Total valid votes		17,667	100	
Total rejected ballots		108	0.61	
Turnout		17,775	57.68	

2005 British Columbia general election: Alberni-Qualicum
Party	Candidate	Votes	%	Expenditures
New Democratic	Scott Fraser	13,988	52.60	$71,781
Liberal	Gillian Trumper	9,788	36.81	$83,861
Green	Jack Thornburgh	1,912	7.19	$281
Marijuana	Michael "Mik" Mann	401	1.51	$100
Democratic Reform	Jen Fisher-Bradley	292	1.10	$1,777
Independent	James Dominic King	209	0.79	$180
Total valid votes		26,590	100	
Total rejected ballots		145	0.55	
Turnout		26,735	69.02	

2004 Canadian federal election: Nanaimo—Alberni
Party	Candidate	Votes	%	±%	Expenditures
Conservative	James Lunney	23,158	39.07	–21.54	$60,734.86
New Democratic	Scott Fraser	19,152	32.31	+17.78	$41,238.00
Liberal	Hira Chopra	11,770	19.86	–0.84	$28,463.45
Green	David Wright	4,357	7.35	–	$9,530.26
Marijuana	Michael Mann	560	0.94	–1.20	none listed
Canadian Action	Diana E. Lifton	201	0.34	–	none listed
Marxist–Leninist	Barbara Biley	80	0.13	–	none listed
Total valid votes/expense limit		59,278	99.72	–	$85,341.38
Total rejected ballots		169	0.28	–0.02	
Turnout		59,447	68.26	+3.32	
Eligible voters		87,088			
Conservative hold		Swing		–19.66	
Conservative vote is compared to the total of the Canadian Alliance vote and Progressive Conservative vote in 2000 election.
Source: Elections Canada

British Columbia provincial government of John Horgan
Cabinet post (1)
Predecessor	Office	Successor
John Rustad	Minister of Indigenous Relations and Reconciliation; July 18, 2017 – November 26, 2020	Murray Rankin
