= Josie Osborne =

Canadian politician

Josie Osborne MLA
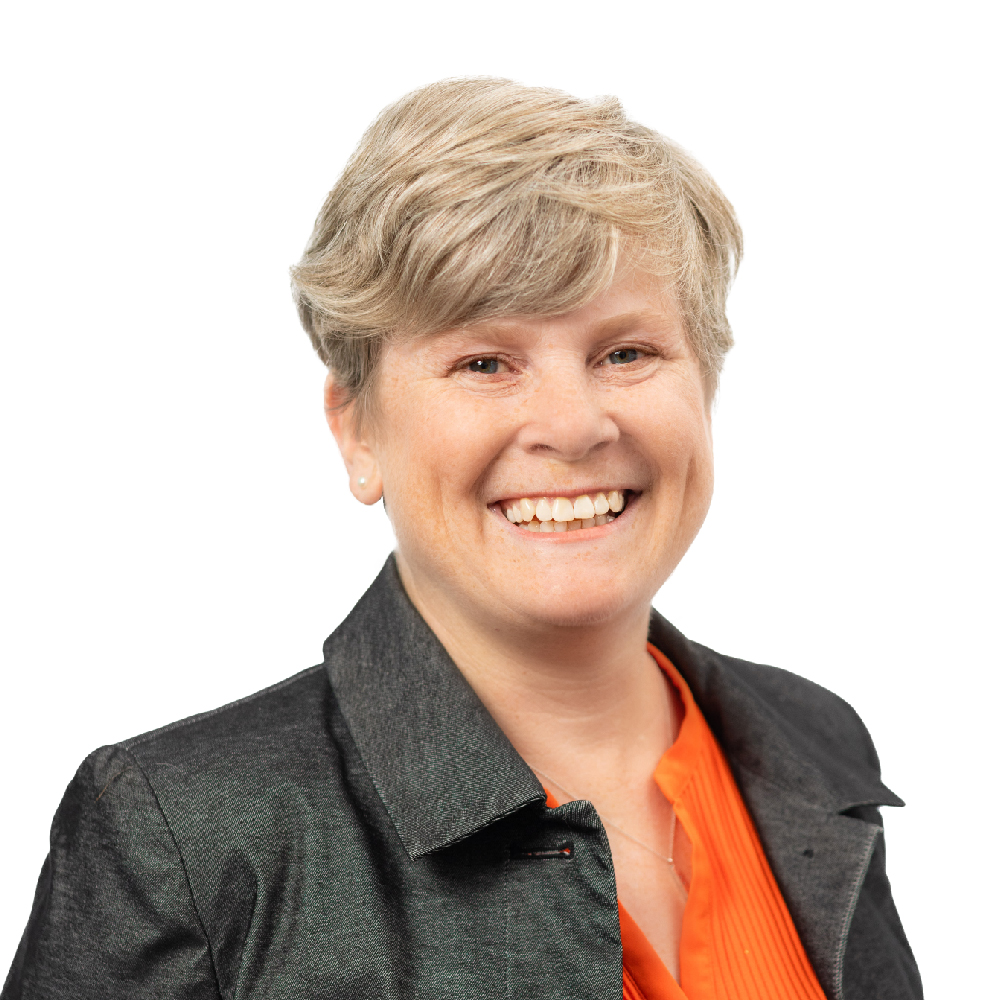
- Campaign portrait, 2024

Minister of Finance of British Columbia
- In office August 14, 2026 – November 20, 2026
- Premier: David Eby
- Preceded by: Brenda Bailey
- Succeeded by: Peter Milobar

Minister of Health of British Columbia
- In office November 18, 2024 – August 14, 2026
- Premier: David Eby
- Preceded by: Adrian Dix
- Succeeded by: Ravi Kahlon

Minister of Energy, Mines and Low Carbon Innovation of British Columbia
- In office December 7, 2022 – November 18, 2024
- Premier: David Eby
- Preceded by: Bruce Ralston
- Succeeded by: Adrian Dix (Energy and Climate Solutions); Jagrup Brar (Mining and Critical Minerals)

Minister of Land, Water and Resource Stewardship of British Columbia
- In office February 25, 2022 – December 7, 2022
- Premier: John Horgan; David Eby
- Preceded by: Position established
- Succeeded by: Nathan Cullen

Minister of Municipal Affairs of British Columbia
- In office November 26, 2020 – February 25, 2022
- Premier: John Horgan
- Preceded by: Selina Robinson (Municipal Affairs and Housing)
- Succeeded by: Nathan Cullen

Member of the British Columbia Legislative Assembly for Mid Island-Pacific Rim
- Incumbent
- Assumed office October 24, 2020
- Preceded by: Scott Fraser

Mayor of Tofino
- In office 2013–2020
- Preceded by: Perry Schmunk
- Succeeded by: Dan Law

Personal details
- Born: 1971 or 1972 (age 54–55)
- Party: New Democratic (since 2020)
- Other political affiliations: Green (until 2020)
- Spouse: George Patterson
- Education: University of British Columbia; Simon Fraser University

Josie Osborne MLA is a Canadian politician who has served as a member of the Legislative Assembly of British Columbia (MLA) representing the electoral district of Mid Island-Pacific Rim since 2020. A member of the New Democratic Party, she served in cabinet from 2020 until 2026. Prior to provincial politics, she served as mayor of Tofino from 2013 to 2020. When she was first elected, she was Canada's only Green Party-affiliated mayor.

== Biography ==
Osborne studied marine biology at the University of British Columbia, then pursued a master's degree in resource management at Simon Fraser University. She moved to Tofino for a position as fisheries biologist for the Nuu-chah-nulth Tribal Council, and later joined Raincoast Education Society, a local environmental education non-profit organization.

She ran as the mayor of Tofino unopposed as the Green Party candidate in both a 2013 by-election and the 2014 municipal election. She was re-elected in 2018 with 86.75% of the overall vote.

Osborne supported the introduction of proportional representation in the 2018 British Columbia electoral reform referendum.

In March 2019, Osborne spoke in favour of more affordable housing in Greater Vancouver.

In September 2020, Osborne announced her intention to seek the BC NDP nomination for the riding of Mid Island-Pacific Rim in the next provincial election. Osborne was successful and was elected as Member of the Legislative Assembly at the October 2020 general election. A mayoral by-election was held in Tofino in February 2021 to replace Osborne.

On November 26, 2020, Osborne was sworn in to the Executive Council of British Columbia as Minister of Municipal Affairs under Premier John Horgan; she was then appointed Minister of Land, Water and Resource Stewardship and Minister responsible for Fisheries in February 2022. She was subsequently named Minister of Energy, Mines and Low Carbon Innovation in the Eby ministry on December 7, 2022.

In April 2024, an investigation was initiated by Osborne into MNP LLP's administration of two grant programs funded through the provincial carbon tax. The allegation was that one of MNP's teams working in the province acted in the capacity as both the administrator and grant application consultant on the CleanBC grant program.

After the 2024 election, Osborne was named Minister of Health. On August 14, 2026, she was named Minister of Finance following a cabinet shuffle.

== Electoral record ==
2026 British Columbia general election: Mid Island-Pacific Rim
Party	Candidate	Votes	%	±%	Expenditures
New Democratic	Josie Osborne	12,687	46.91		
Conservative	Joshua Dahling	10,883	40.24		
Green	Gracie MacDonald	3,424	12.66		
Total valid votes		26,994	99.82		
Total rejected ballots		50	0.18		
Turnout		27,044			
Registered voters					
New Democratic hold		Swing		−1.48	
Source: Elections BC

2024 British Columbia general election: Mid Island-Pacific Rim
Party	Candidate	Votes	%	±%	Expenditures
New Democratic	Josie Osborne	14,042	48.74	-9.5	$38,708.09
Conservative	Adam Hayduk	11,366	39.45	–	$6,370.06
Green	Ross Reid	3,402	11.81	-8.5	$1,487.73
Total valid votes/expense limit		28,810	99.80	–	$71,700.08
Total rejected ballots		58	0.20	–	
Turnout		28,868	60.37	–	
Registered voters		47,816			
New Democratic notional hold		Swing		-24.5	
Source: Elections BC

2020 British Columbia general election: Mid Island-Pacific Rim
Party	Candidate	Votes	%	±%	Expenditures
New Democratic	Josie Osborne	14,298	58.22	+9.17	$26,111.41
Green	Evan Jolicoeur	4,991	20.32	−0.02	$8,752.80
Liberal	Helen Poon	4,291	17.47	−8.22	$25,201.50
Independent	Graham Hughes	610	2.48	–	$0.00
Libertarian	Robert Alexander Clarke	370	1.51	+0.36	$884.41
Total valid votes		24,560	100.00	–	
Total rejected ballots					
Turnout					
Registered voters					
Source: Elections BC
