= Alberni-Qualicum =

Defunct provincial electoral district in British Columbia, Canada

British Columbia electoral district

Defunct provincial electoral district
- Legislature: Legislative Assembly of British Columbia
- District created: 1999
- District abolished: 2009
- First contested: 2001
- Last contested: 2005

Demographics
- Population (2001): 50,695
- Area (km²): 8,553.16
- Census division: Alberni-Clayoquot Regional District
- Census subdivision(s): Port Alberni, Tofino, Ucluelet

Alberni-Qualicum was a provincial electoral district for the Legislative Assembly of British Columbia, Canada from 2001 to 2009.

== Demographics ==
Population, 2001	50,695
Population Change, 1996–2001	-0.2%
Area (km^{2})	8,553.16
Pop. Density (people per km^{2})	6

== Geography ==
=== 1999 redistribution ===
The changes from Alberni to Alberni-Qualicum include:

- Inclusion of Qualicum and other areas to the east

== History ==
The riding was represented by Scott Fraser of the British Columbia New Democratic Party from 2005 to 2009. Prior to that, the seat was held by Gillian Trumper of the Liberal Party of British Columbia from 2001 to 2005.

== Election results ==
2001 British Columbia general election
Party	Candidate	Votes	%	±%	Expenditures
Liberal	Gillian Trumper	13,109	53.32	+17.47	$34,684
New Democratic	Gerard Janssen	7,395	30.08	-21.93	$10,768
Green	Sergio Paone	2,999	12.20	+10.83	$4,066
Marijuana	Nicholas Saint Edmund Thorp	1,081	4.40	–	$1,578
Total valid votes		24,584	100.00		
Total rejected ballots		93	0.38		
Turnout		24,677	74.70		
Liberal gain from New Democratic		Swing		+19.7	

2005 British Columbia general election
Party	Candidate	Votes	%	Expenditures
New Democratic	Scott Fraser	13,988	52.60	$71,781
Liberal	Gillian Trumper	9,788	36.81	$83,861
Green	Jack Thornburgh	1,912	7.19	$281
Marijuana	Michael "Mik" Mann	401	1.51	$100
Democratic Reform	Jen Fisher-Bradley	292	1.10	$1,777
Independent	James Dominic King	209	0.79	$180
Total valid votes		26,590	100	
Total rejected ballots		145	0.55	
Turnout		26,735	69.02	
