= Ucluelet Aquarium =

Aquarium in British Columbia, Canada

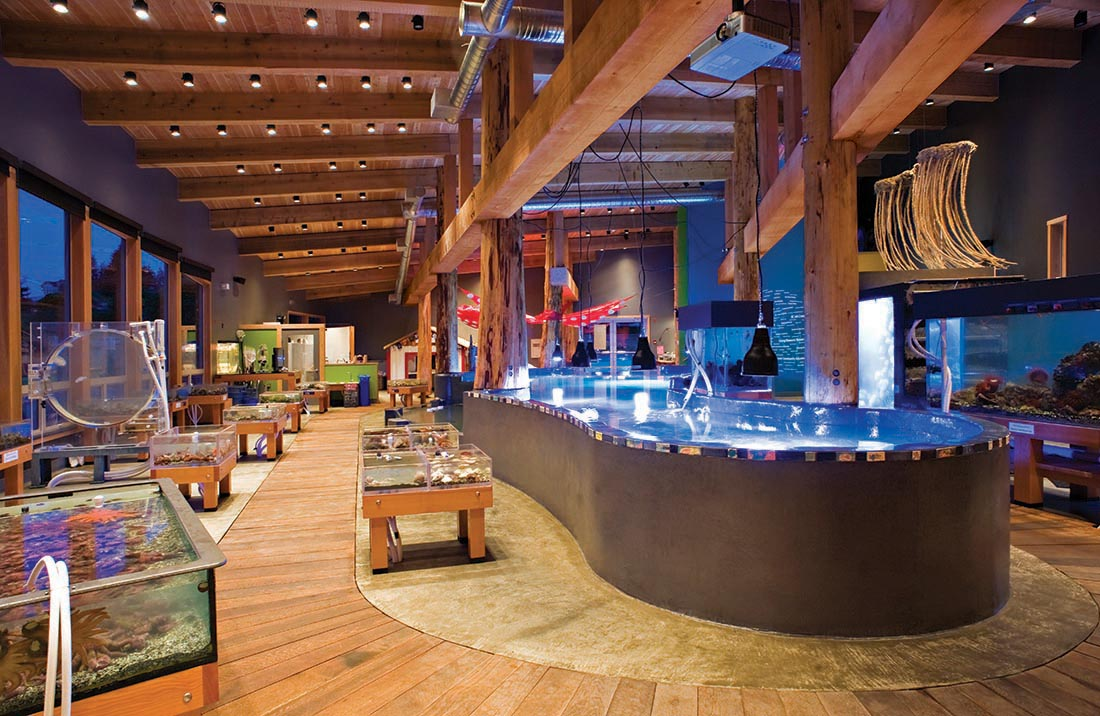
- Interactive map of Ucluelet Aquarium
- Date opened: May 2004 (mini aquarium); 2012 (temporary aqua museum)
- Location: Ucluelet, British Columbia, CAN
- No. of animals: 300
- Website: uclueletaquarium.org

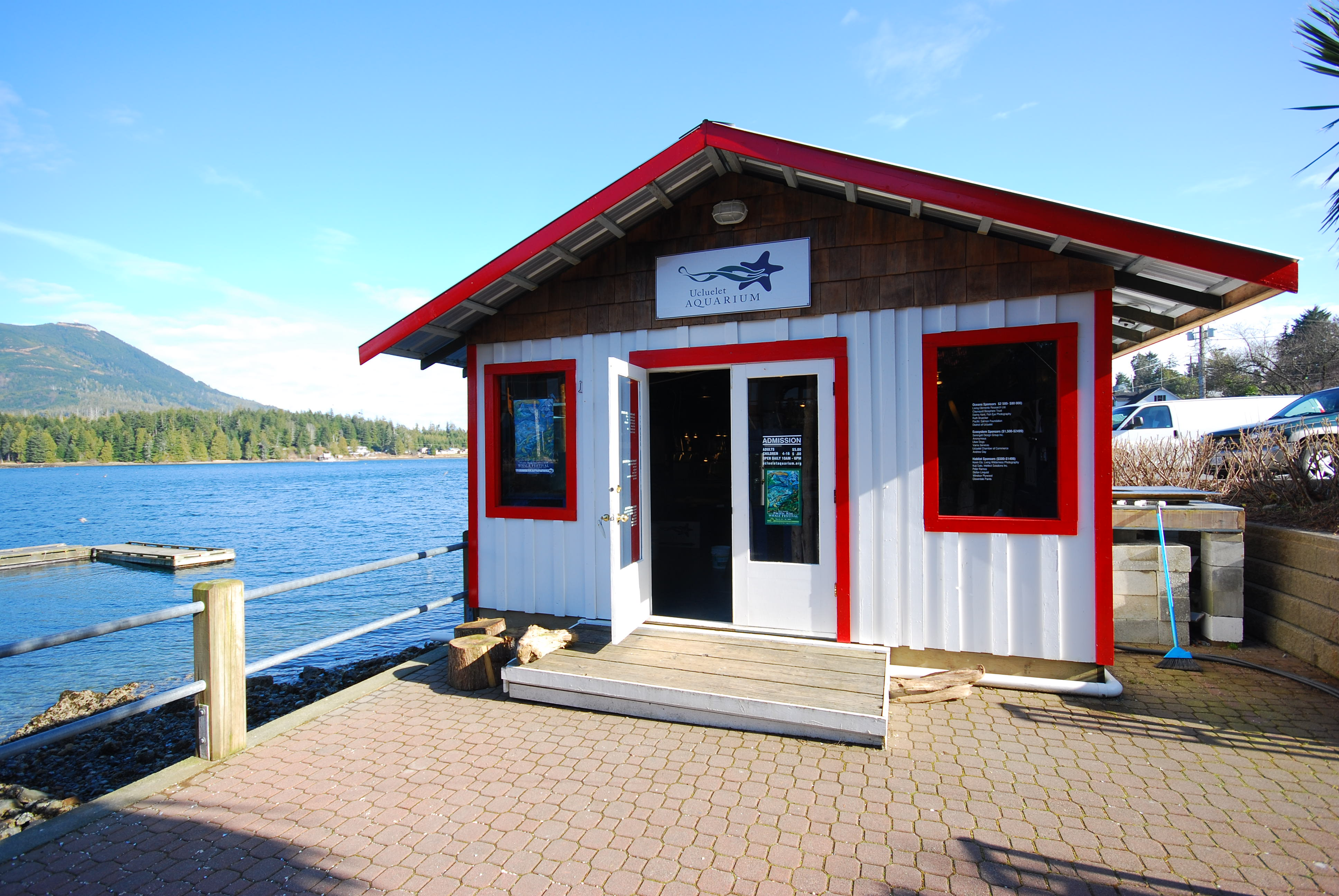
Ucluelet Old Mini-Aquarium

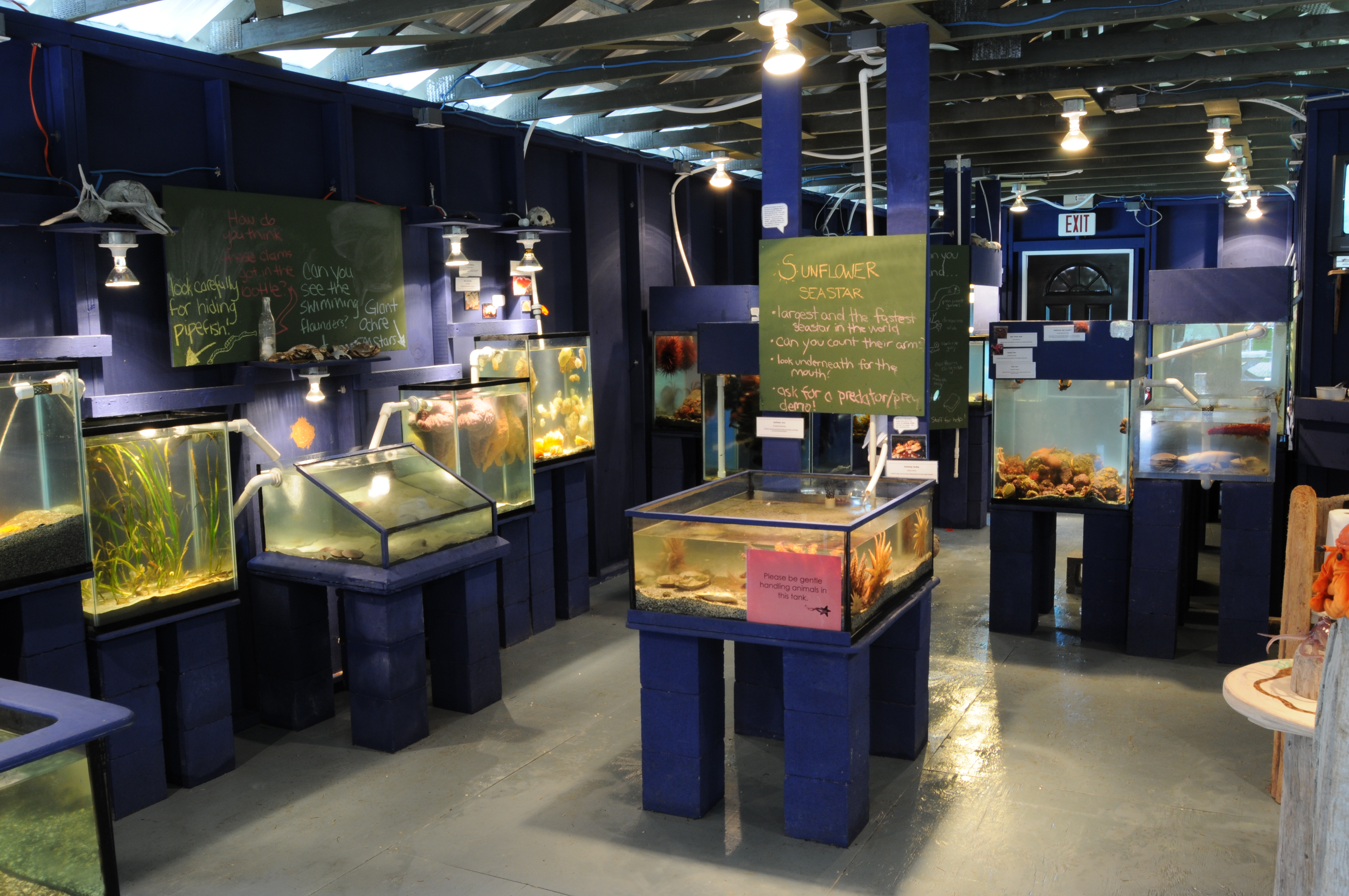
Inside the Ucluelet Old Mini-Aquarium

The Ucluelet Aquarium is a non-profit public aquarium in Ucluelet, a town on the west coast of Vancouver Island, British Columbia, Canada. The aquarium opened a new permanent building on 1 June 2012. The smaller temporary building located on the waterfront promenade had previously operated as a feasibility trial beginning in 2004 and ran seasonally until 2011. It exhibits marine plant and animal life (invertebrates and fishes) native to the west coast of Vancouver Island. The aquarium fosters an "up close and personal" visitor experience through their educational approach, which encourages active participation with staff and volunteers in learning about the marine life on display.

== Displays ==
All of the specimens in the exhibits, with the exception of freshwater juvenile salmon, are collected from the nearby Pacific Ocean, specifically from Barkley Sound and Clayoquot Sound, and are seasonally released back into the ocean. This part of Vancouver Island harbours a wide variety of habitats and species because of its varied geography and exposure to the open ocean. Most specimens are collected either by scuba divers, by hand at low tide, or by hand seining beaches, whereby specific target animals are removed from the net and the rest are returned to the water. Other specimens are occasionally donated by local fisher folk who can access deep or offshore habitats.

The feature display animal is the Giant Pacific Octopus, which at this northern latitude ranges to near the surface. Other animals central to the displays are various rockfish species, crabs, bivalves, feather duster worms, bay pipefish, sea anemones, and the sea pen. Interesting species sometimes displayed include the spotted ratfish, Humboldt squid, basket star, spot prawn, and red octopus. In addition, because the aquarium continuously pumps raw sea water through its exhibits, planktonic larvae of all sorts settle out in the exhibits, providing an ever-changing challenge of interesting discoveries. Of particular abundance are the opalescent nudibranch and sand-dwelling shellfish species like clam larvae, which grow into juvenile clams over the summer and are then returned to the beach.

== Permanent building ==
After operating the temporary facility to evaluate the feasibility of the project (the "Mini-Aquarium"), enough support was garnered to justify the construction of a permanent aquarium in a nearby location overlooking Ucluelet Harbor, which opened its doors on 1 June 2012. Groundbreaking for the new aquarium was on 29 June 2011. The government of Canada provided $270,500 investment through the Western Diversification Program, and the West Coast Community Adjustment Program contributed $250,000 towards the project. The permanent facility enriches the existing intertidal beach habitat by feeding several tidepools with outflowing seawater from the building, which will increase the diversity of life in the immediate area and provide more living habitats for visitors to explore in the publicly accessible beach area. The building incorporates the latest in sustainable green technology and showcases this to visitors so that they can leave with a greater understanding of how to achieve energy efficiency in their own homes.

== Gallery ==
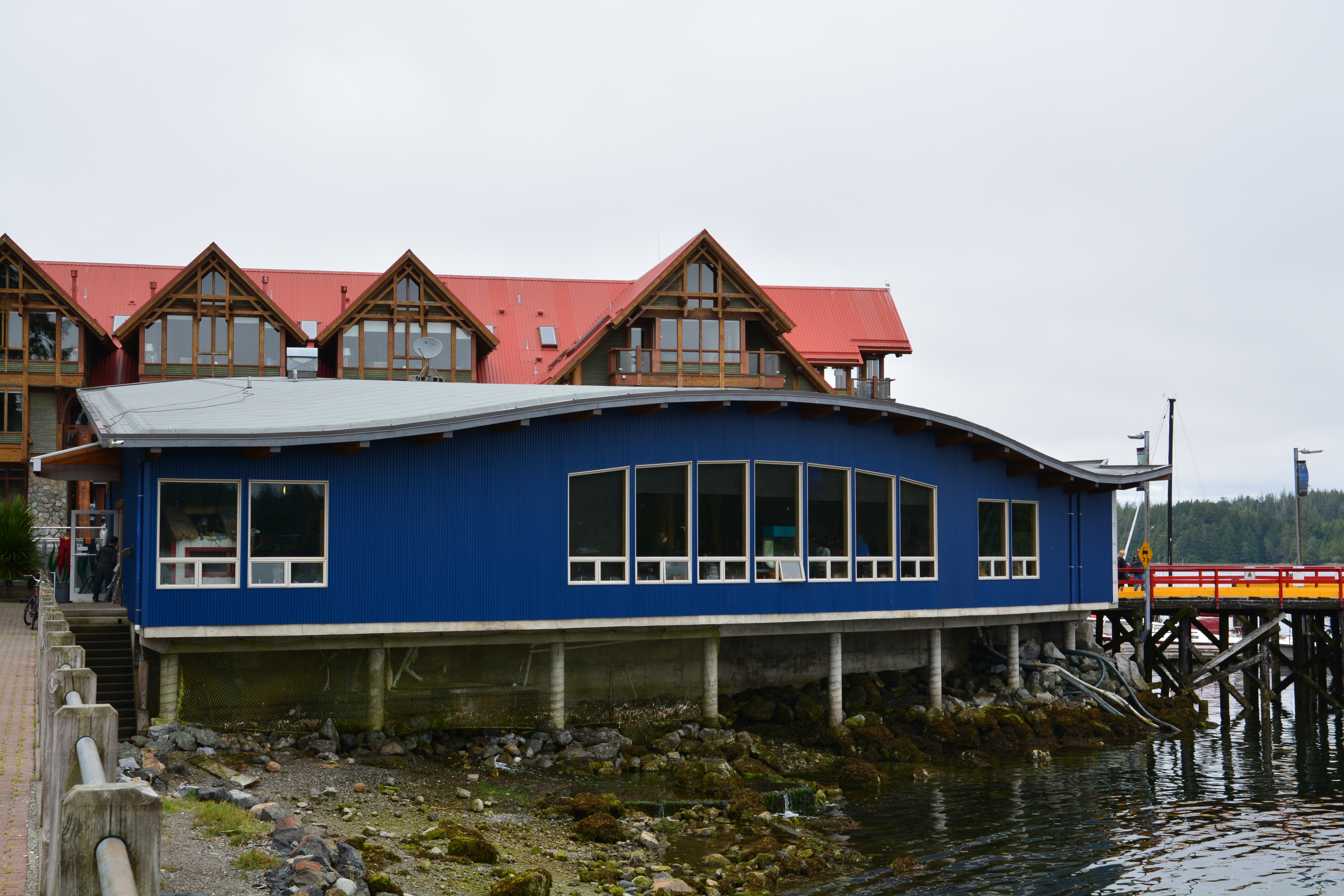

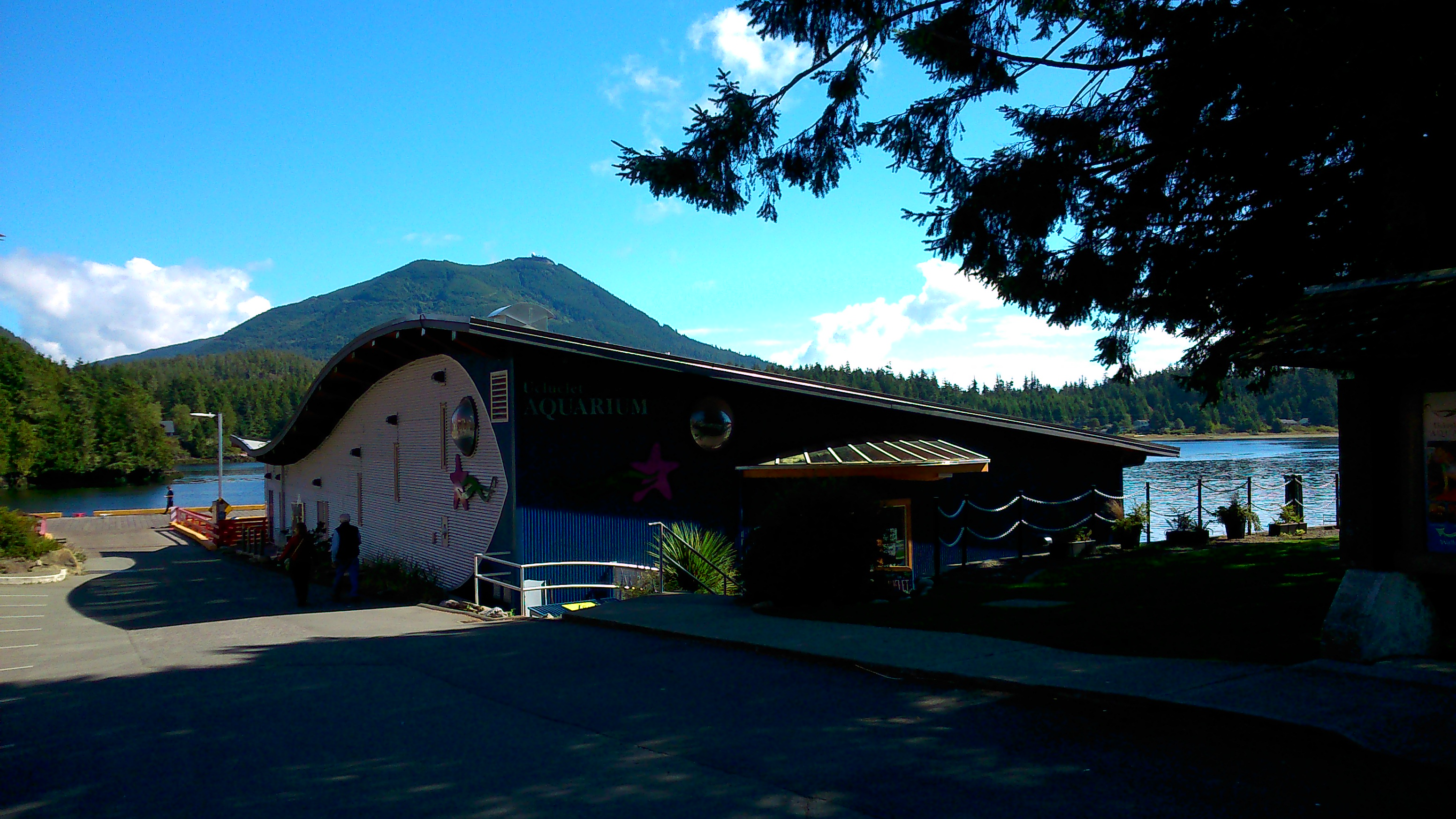

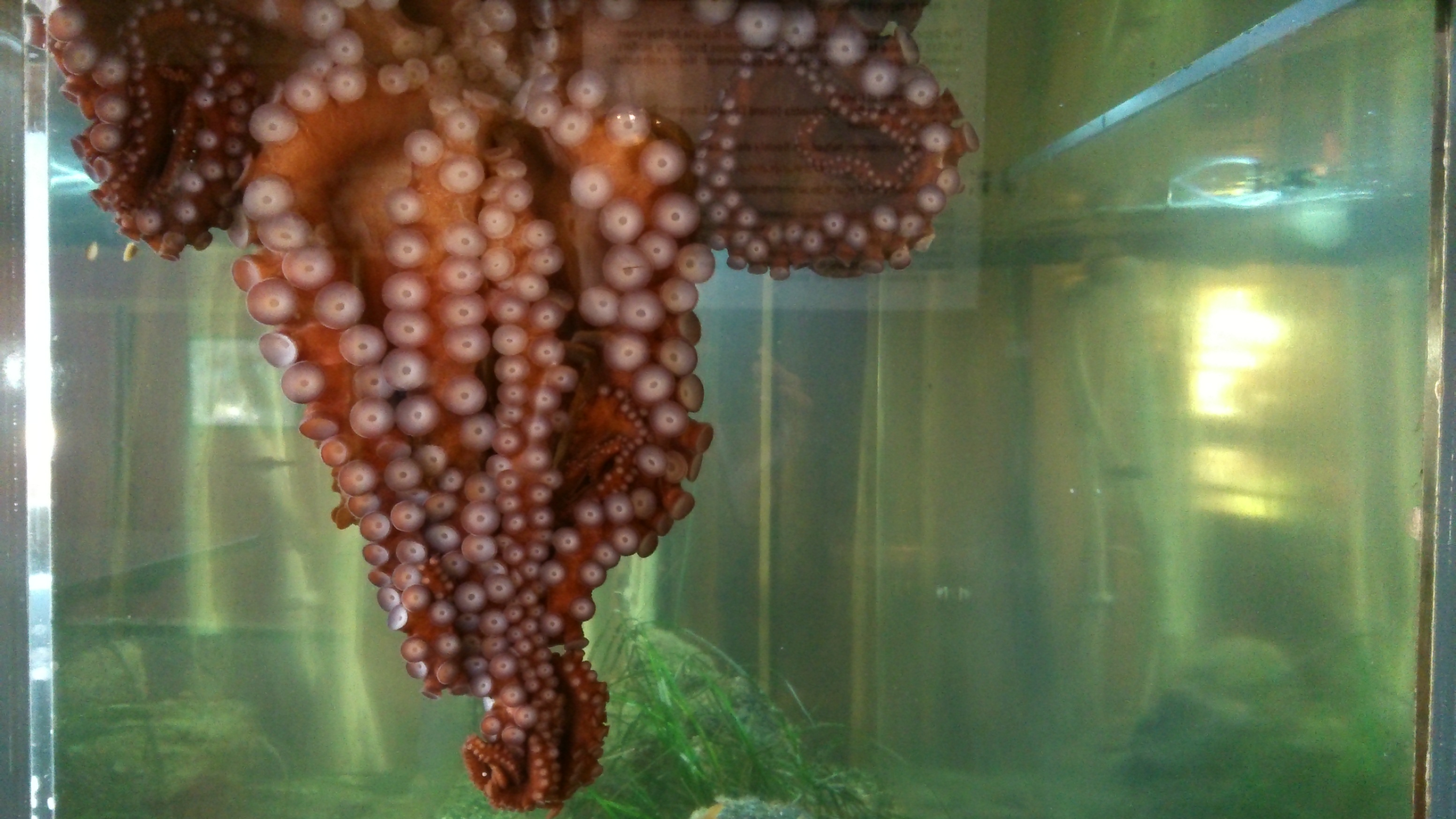

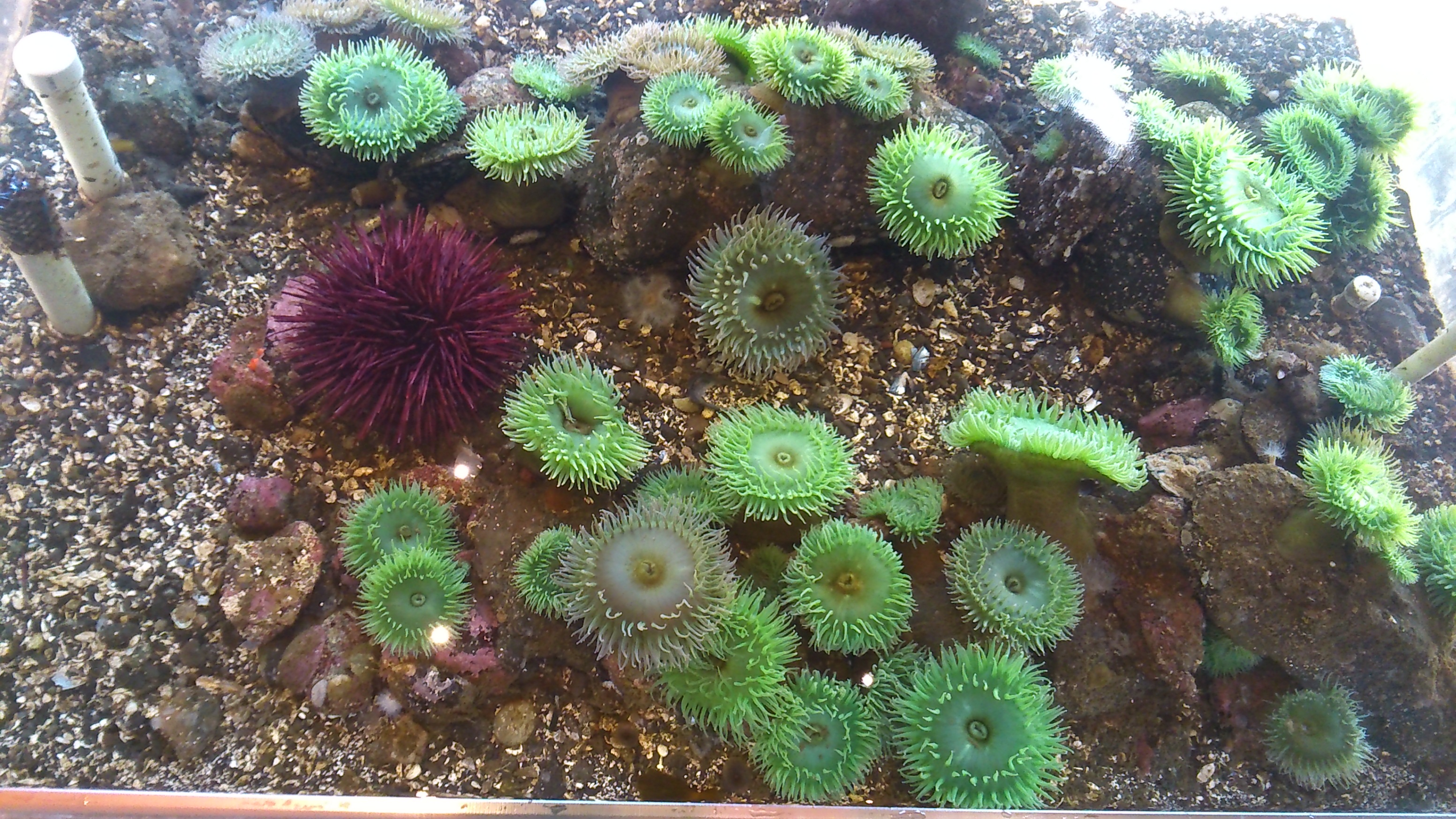

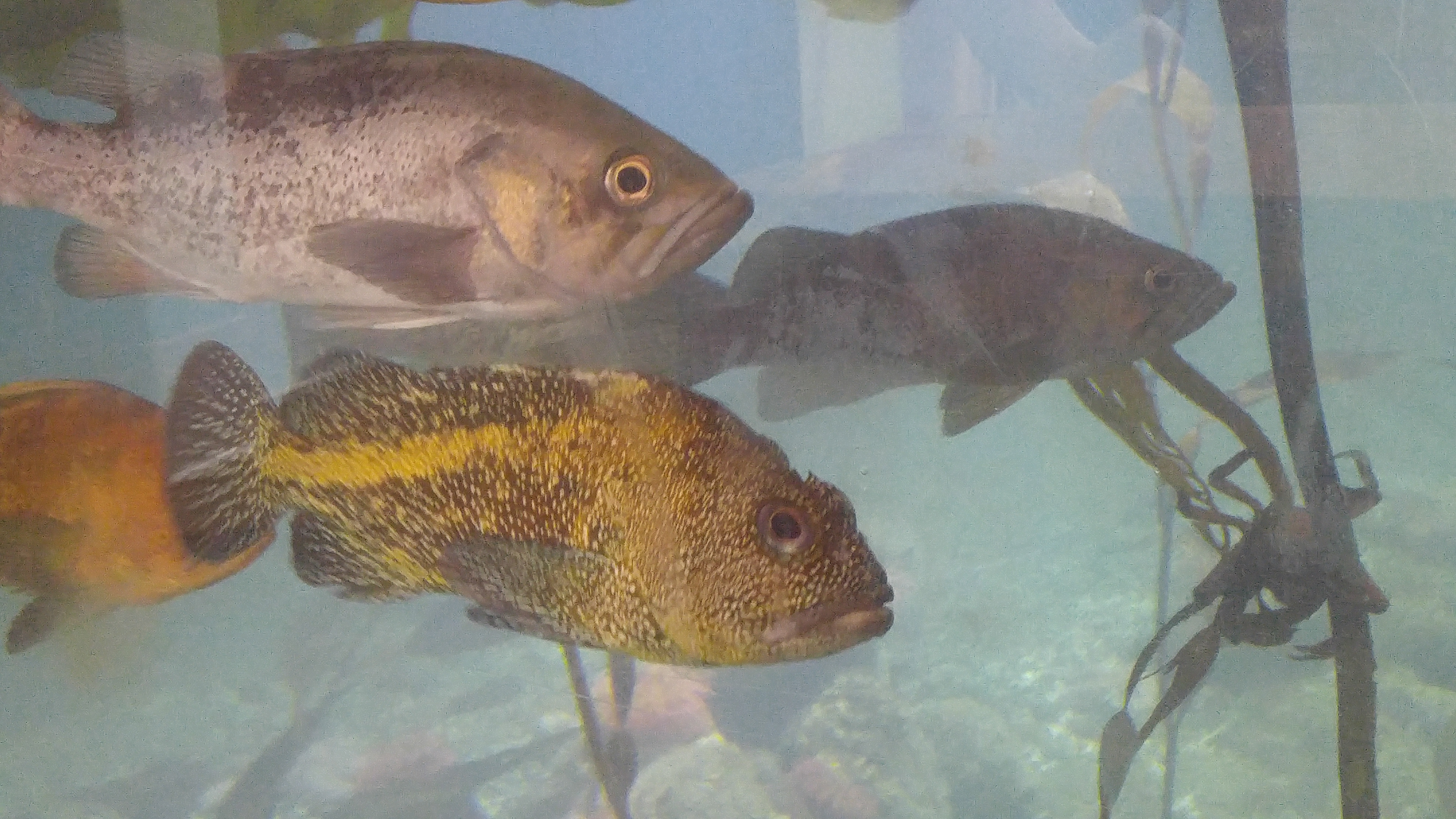

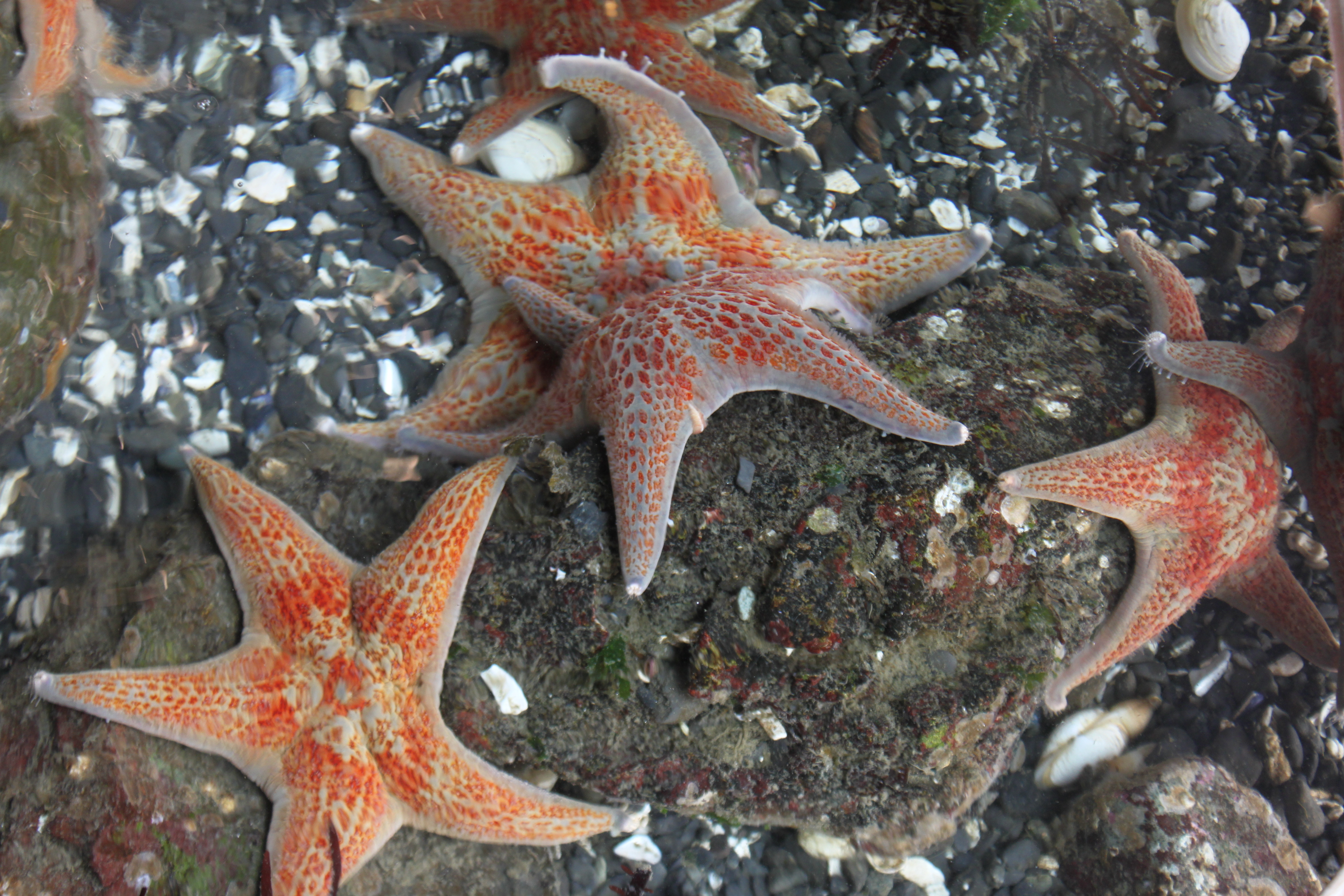

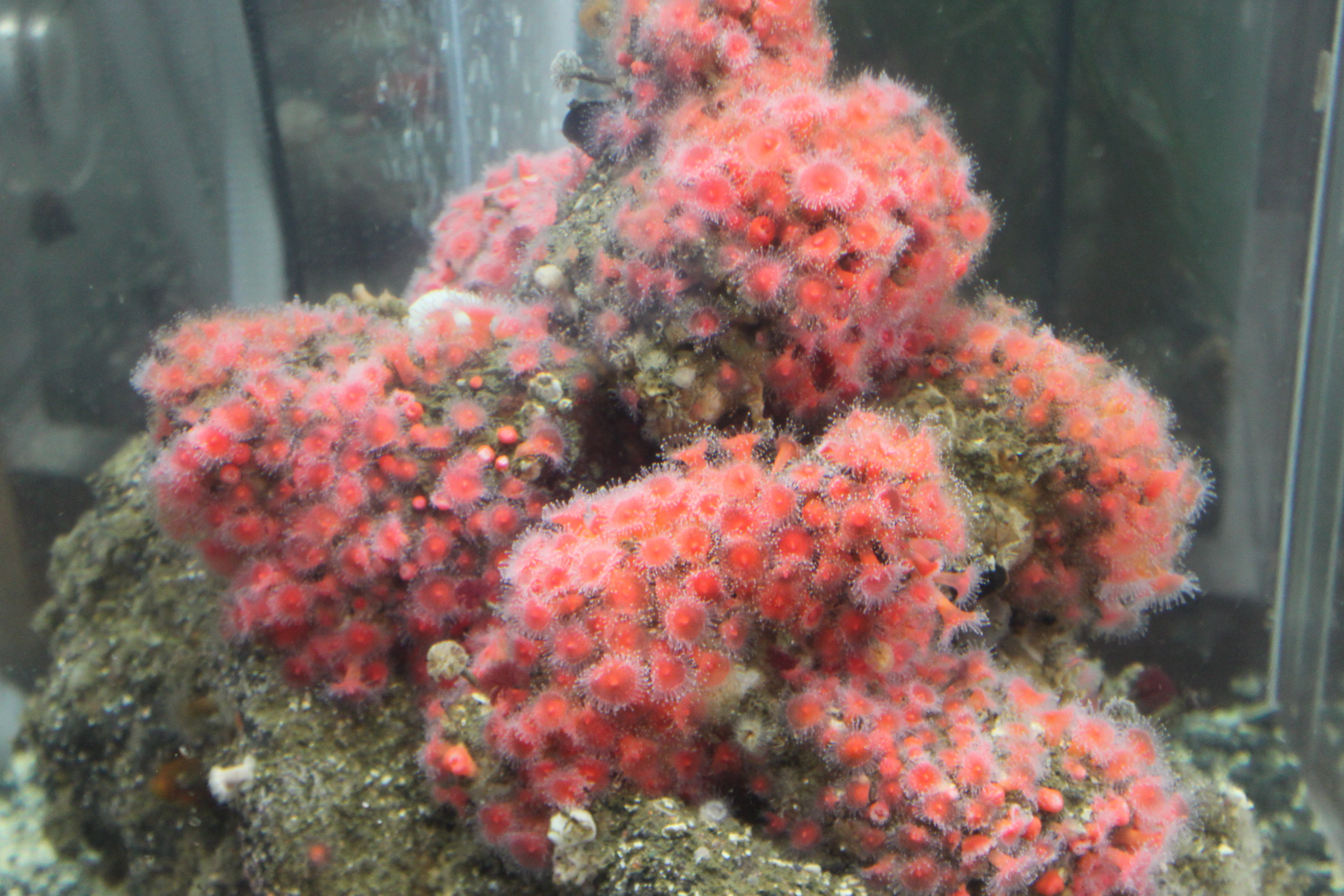

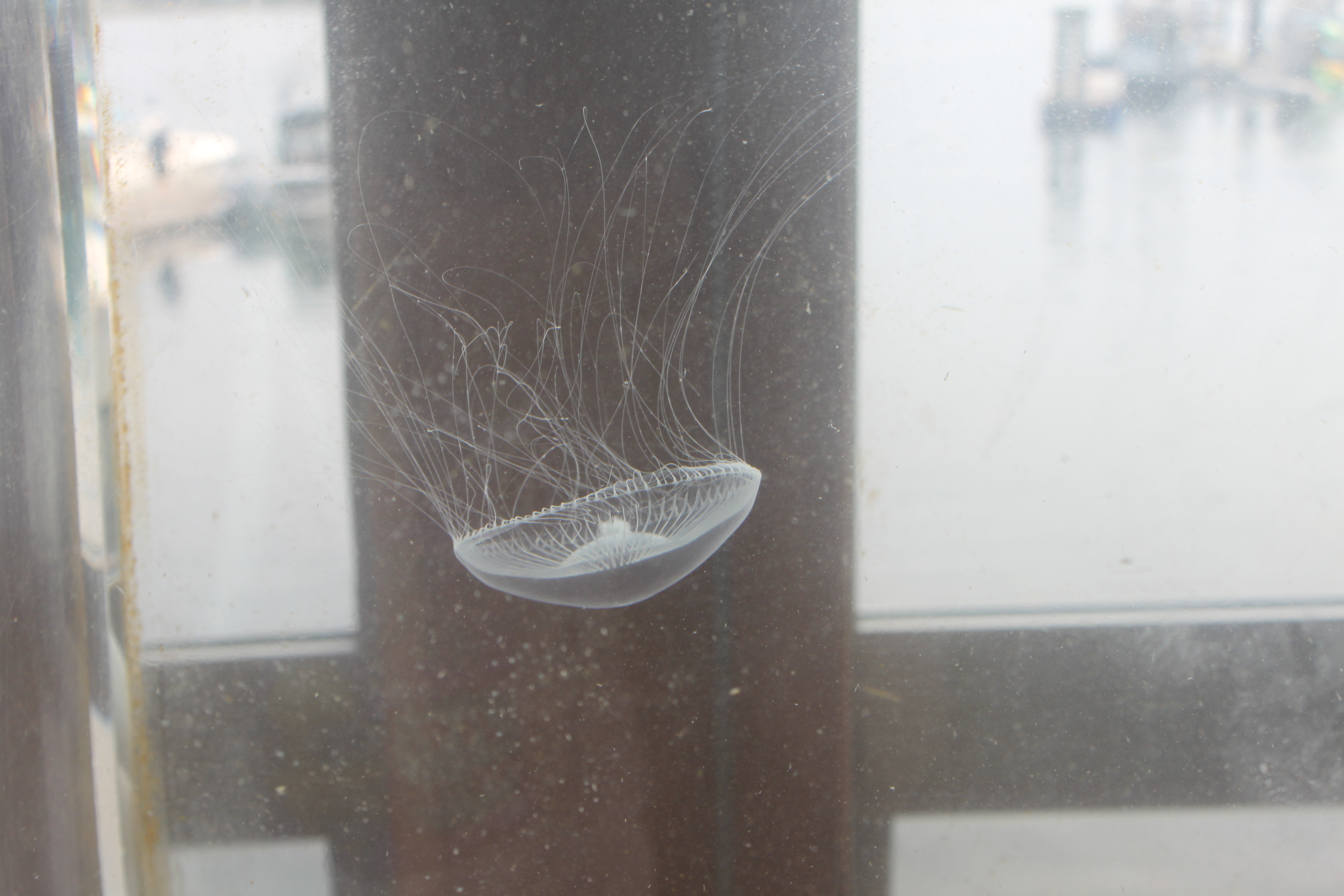
