= Gerard Janssen =

Canadian politician (born 1946)

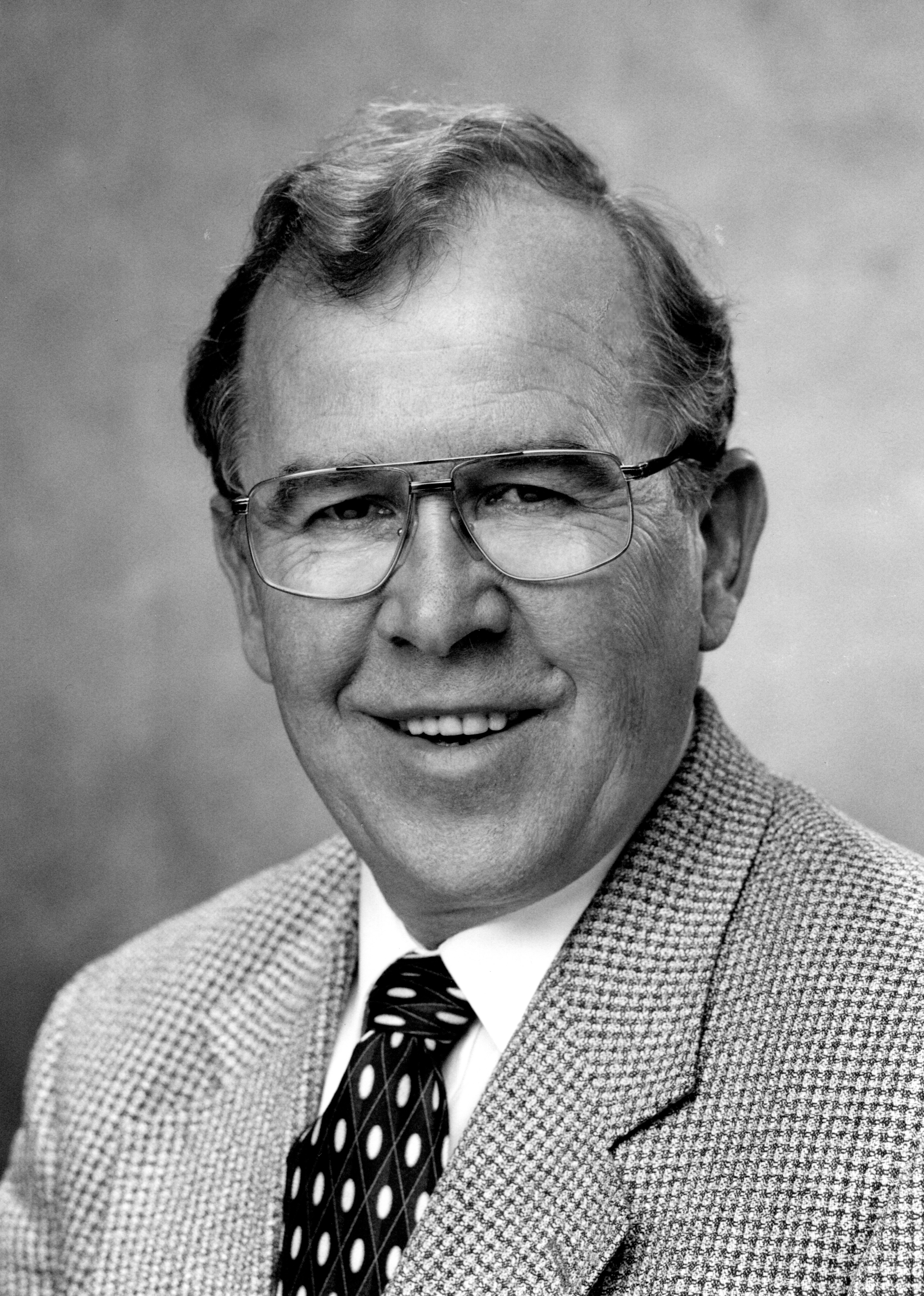

Member of the British Columbia Legislative Assembly for Alberni
- In office November 19, 1988 – May 16, 2001
- Preceded by: Bob Skelly
- Succeeded by: Gillian Trumper

Personal details
- Born: May 3, 1946 (age 79) Venlo, Netherlands
- Party: British Columbia New Democratic Party
- Occupation: Jeweller

Gerard A. Janssen (b. May 3, 1946) is a Dutch-born jeweller, watchmaker and former political figure in British Columbia. He represented Alberni in the Legislative Assembly of British Columbia from 1988 to 2001 as a New Democratic Party (NDP) member.

He was born in Venlo, the son of Nicholas Jannsen and Maria Sloesen, and came to Canada with his parents in 1952. Janssen later took over the operation of the business established by his parents in 1956. In 1967, he married Florence Edith Irene McIver. He was a member of the Alberni Valley Chamber of Commerce, also serving as its president. Janssen was first elected to the provincial assembly in a 1988 by-election held after Bob Skelly resigned his seat to enter federal politics. He served as government whip in the assembly. Janssen was a member of the provincial cabinet, serving as Minister of Small Business, Tourism and Culture from 2000 to 2001. He was defeated by Gillian Trumper when he ran for reelection to the assembly in the new riding of Alberni-Qualicum in 2001.

== Electoral history ==
2001 British Columbia general election: Alberni-Qualicum
Party	Candidate	Votes	%	±%	Expenditures
Liberal	Gillian Trumper	13,109	53.32	+17.47	$34,684
New Democratic	Gerard Janssen	7,395	30.08	-21.93	$10,768
Green	Sergio Paone	2,999	12.20	+10.83	$4,066
Marijuana	Nicholas Saint Edmund Thorp	1,081	4.40	–	$1,578
Total valid votes		24,584	100.00		
Total rejected ballots		93	0.38		
Turnout		24,677	74.70		
Liberal gain from New Democratic		Swing		+19.7	

1996 British Columbia general election: Alberni
Party	Candidate	Votes	%	±%
New Democratic	Gerard A. Janssen	7,398	52.01	-1.38
Liberal	Gillian Trumper	5,099	35.85	+18.21
Reform	V. Hansen	823	5.79	–
Progressive Democrat	Ingrid Helen Rebar	578	4.06	–
Green	Andre Sperling	195	1.37	–
Co-operative Commonwealth	Karl Angus	72	0.51	–
Natural Law	Kathleen Lapreyrouse	58	0.41	–
Total valid votes		14,223	100.00	
Total rejected ballots		86	0.98	
Turnout		14,309		
New Democratic hold		Swing		+9.80

1991 British Columbia general election: Alberni
Party	Candidate	Votes	%	±%
New Democratic	Gerard A. Janssen	7,136	53.39	-4.08
Social Credit	Gillian Trumper	3,665	27.43	-0.37
Liberal	Peter J. Tanner	2,358	17.64	+2.91
Western Canada Concept	Alan W. Banford	206	1.54	–
Total valid votes		13,365	100.00	
Total rejected ballots		372	0.27	
Turnout		13,737		
New Democratic hold		Swing		-2.23

British Columbia provincial by-election, November 19, 1988: Alberni
Party	Candidate	Votes	%	±%
New Democratic	Gerard A. Janssen	6,401	57.47	+2.18
Social Credit	George S. Dryden	3,096	27.80	−13.92
Liberal	Shirley M. Bonfield	1,640	14.73	+12.3
Total valid votes/expense limit		11,137	100.0	–
Total rejected ballots		136	0.38	
Turnout		11,273		
New Democratic hold		Swing		+8.05
By-election due to the Resignation of Robert Skelly to run for the Canadian House of Commons.
Source(s) "November 19, 1988 By-election" (PDF). Legislative Assembly of British Columbia. 19 November 1988.

British Columbia provincial government of Ujjal Dosanjh
Cabinet post (1)
Predecessor	Office	Successor
Ian Waddell	Minister of Small Business, Tourism and Culture; November 1, 2000–June 5, 2001	Ministry Abolished
