= List of Canadian Coast Guard MCTS Centres =

These are the Marine Communications and Traffic Services centres operated by the Canadian Coast Guard. They provide distress and safety communications, vessel traffic services and marine weather information. "The Canadian Coast Guard announced in May of 2012 that they would be reducing the number of MCTS Centres across Canada from 22 to the present 12 centres in an effort to reduce the Coast Guard operating budget."

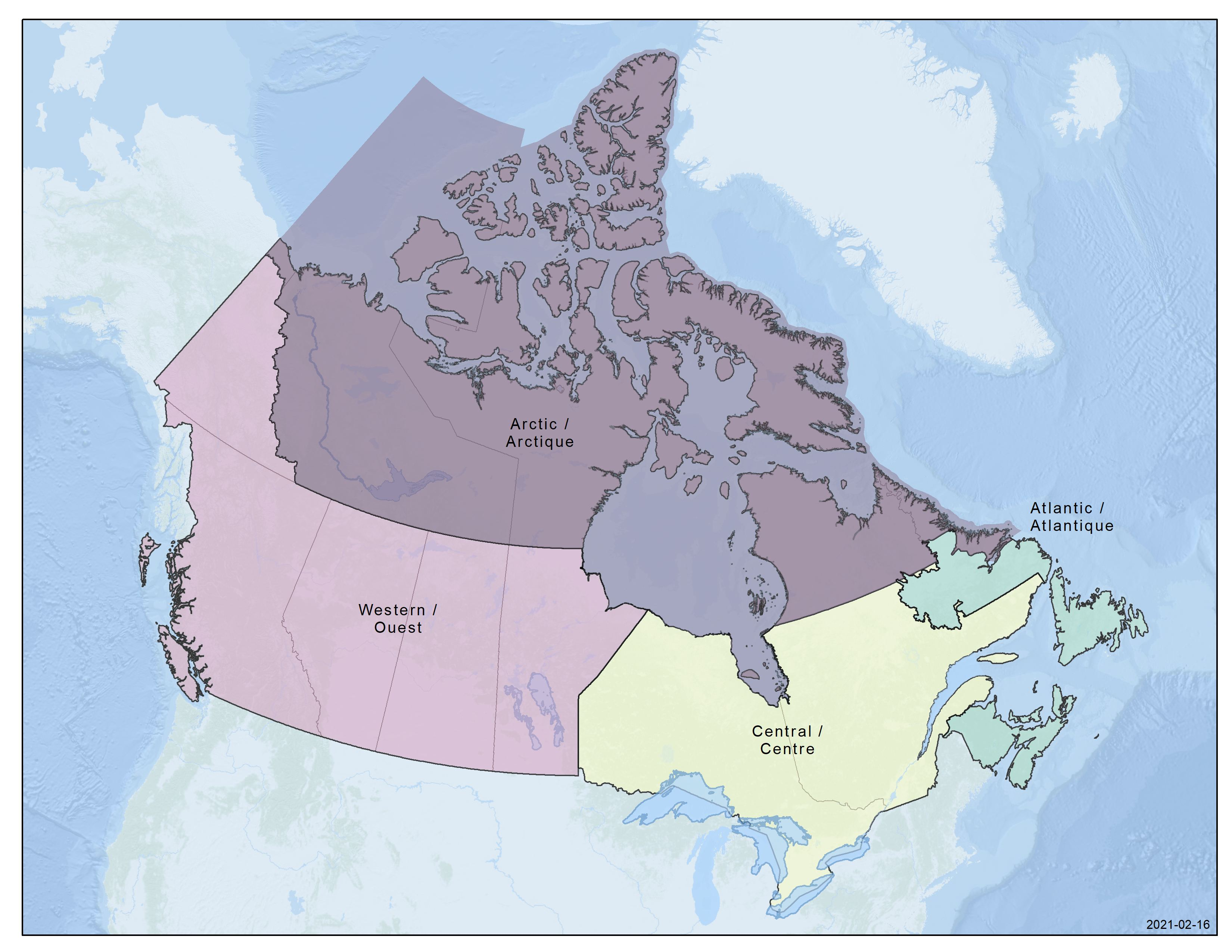
Map showing the operating regions of the Canadian Coast Guard: the Atlantic Region, the Central Region, the Arctic Region and the Western Region.

Western Region
Site	Callsign	MMSI
Prince Rupert	VAJ	003160013
Victoria	VAK	003160011

Central Region
Site	Callsign	MMSI
Les Escoumins	VCF	003160026
Prescott	VBR	003160029
Quebec	VCC	003160027
Sarnia	VBE	003160030

Arctic Region
Site	Callsign	MMSI
Iqaluit	VFF	003160023

Atlantic Region
Site	Callsign	MMSI
Halifax	VCS	003160016
Labrador	VOK	003160022
Placentia	VCP	003160019
Port aux Basques	VOJ	003160018
Sydney	VCO	003160017

== See also ==
- Equipment of the Canadian Coast Guard
- List of Canadian Coast Guard Bases and Stations
