= Gillian Trumper =

Canadian politician (1936–2019)

MLA for Alberni-Qualicum
- In office 2001–2005
- Preceded by: Gerard Janssen
- Succeeded by: Scott Fraser

Personal details
- Born: April 28, 1936 Croydon, England
- Died: October 11, 2019 (aged 83) Port Alberni, British Columbia, Canada
- Party: BC Liberal
- Spouse: Michael Trumper
- Children: four

Gillian Rosemary Trumper (April 28, 1936 – October 11, 2019) was a Canadian politician, who represented the electoral district of Alberni-Qualicum in the Legislative Assembly of British Columbia from 2001 until her defeat in the 2005 provincial election. She sat as a member of the BC Liberal Party. She previously served as Mayor of the City of Port Alberni from 1983 to 2001. She was the Union of BC Municipalities president and its Fisheries Committee chair, West Coast Treaty Advisory Committee chair, and Alberni-Clayoquot Regional District Board chair. Prior to being elected to the legislature, she was an unsuccessful candidate in the 1986, 1991, and 1996 provincial elections. She died at the age of 83 from complications of renal failure in 2019.

== Electoral record ==
2001 British Columbia general election: Alberni-Qualicum
Party	Candidate	Votes	%	±%	Expenditures
Liberal	Gillian Trumper	13,109	53.32	+17.47	$34,684
New Democratic	Gerard Janssen	7,395	30.08	-21.93	$10,768
Green	Sergio Paone	2,999	12.20	+10.83	$4,066
Marijuana	Nicholas Saint Edmund Thorp	1,081	4.40	–	$1,578
Total valid votes		24,584	100.00		
Total rejected ballots		93	0.38		
Turnout		24,677	74.70		
Liberal gain from New Democratic		Swing		+19.7	

2005 British Columbia general election: Alberni-Qualicum
Party	Candidate	Votes	%	Expenditures
New Democratic	Scott Fraser	13,988	52.60	$71,781
Liberal	Gillian Trumper	9,788	36.81	$83,861
Green	Jack Thornburgh	1,912	7.19	$281
Marijuana	Michael "Mik" Mann	401	1.51	$100
Democratic Reform	Jen Fisher-Bradley	292	1.10	$1,777
Independent	James Dominic King	209	0.79	$180
Total valid votes		26,590	100	
Total rejected ballots		145	0.55	
Turnout		26,735	69.02	
