= Ucluelet =

District municipality on Vancouver Island

- District municipality
- District of Ucluelet
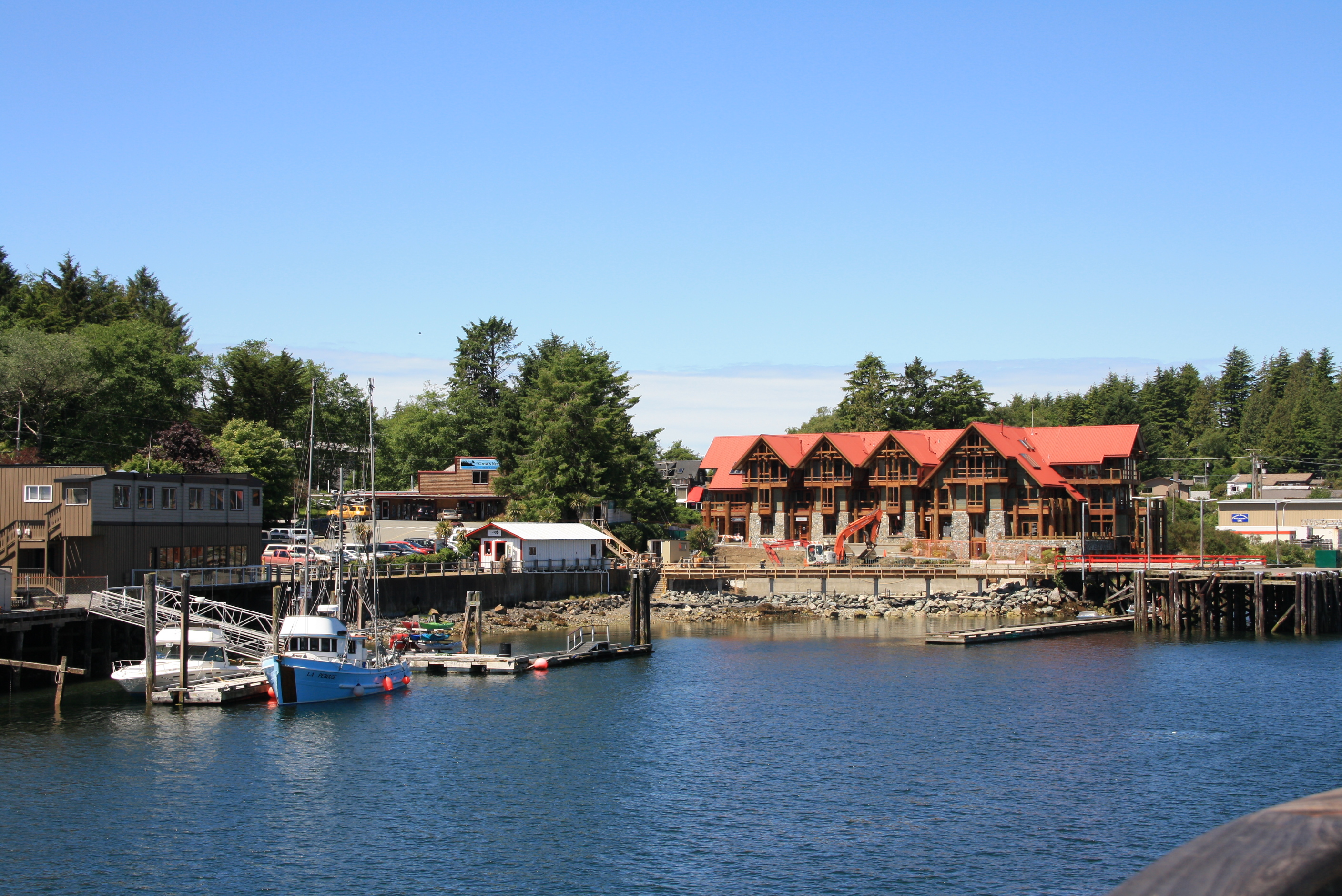
- Ucluelet's public dock
- Nickname: Ukee
- Location within Vancouver Island Location within British Columbia
- Coordinates: 48°56′34″N 125°32′46″W
- Country: Canada
- Province: British Columbia
- Region: Vancouver Island
- Regional district: Alberni-Clayoquot Regional District
- Incorporated: 1952

Government
  - Type: District of Ucluelet
  - Mayor: Marilyn McEwen

Area
  - Total: 6.81 km^{2} (2.63 sq mi)
  - Land: 6.49 km^{2} (2.51 sq mi)
  - Water: 0.32 km^{2} (0.12 sq mi)
- Elevation: 20 m (66 ft)

Population (2021)
  - Total: 2,066
  - Density: 318.8/km^{2} (826/sq mi)
- Time zone: UTC−07:00 (PT)
- Postal code span: V0R 3A0
- Area code: 250
- Highways: 4
- Waterways: Barkley Sound
- Climate: Cfb
- Website: ucluelet.ca

Ucluelet (/juːˈkluːlɪt/; colloquially known as Ukee) is a district municipality on the Ucluelet Peninsula, on the west coast of Vancouver Island in British Columbia, Canada. Ucluelet comes from Yuułuʔił which means "people of the safe harbour" in the indigenous Nuu-chah-nulth language and is the homeland of the Yuułuʔiłʔatḥ. As of 2021, its population was 2,066, a 20.3% increase from 1,717 in 2016.

== Geography ==
Ucluelet is located at the western edge of Barkley Sound, 288 km (179 mi) northwest of the British Columbia provincial capital, Victoria, on the outer west coast of Vancouver Island.

The closest city is Port Alberni, which is approximately 100 km (62 mi) to the east. The District of Tofino is 40 km (25 mi) northwest of Ucluelet on Highway 4.

In between Tofino and Ucluelet is the Long Beach unit of the Pacific Rim National Park Reserve. Barkley Sound lies southeast of Ucluelet and is a marine area that features the Broken Islands Group unit of the Pacific Rim National Park Reserve. The fishing and scientific research community of Bamfield lies on its farther shore.

== History ==
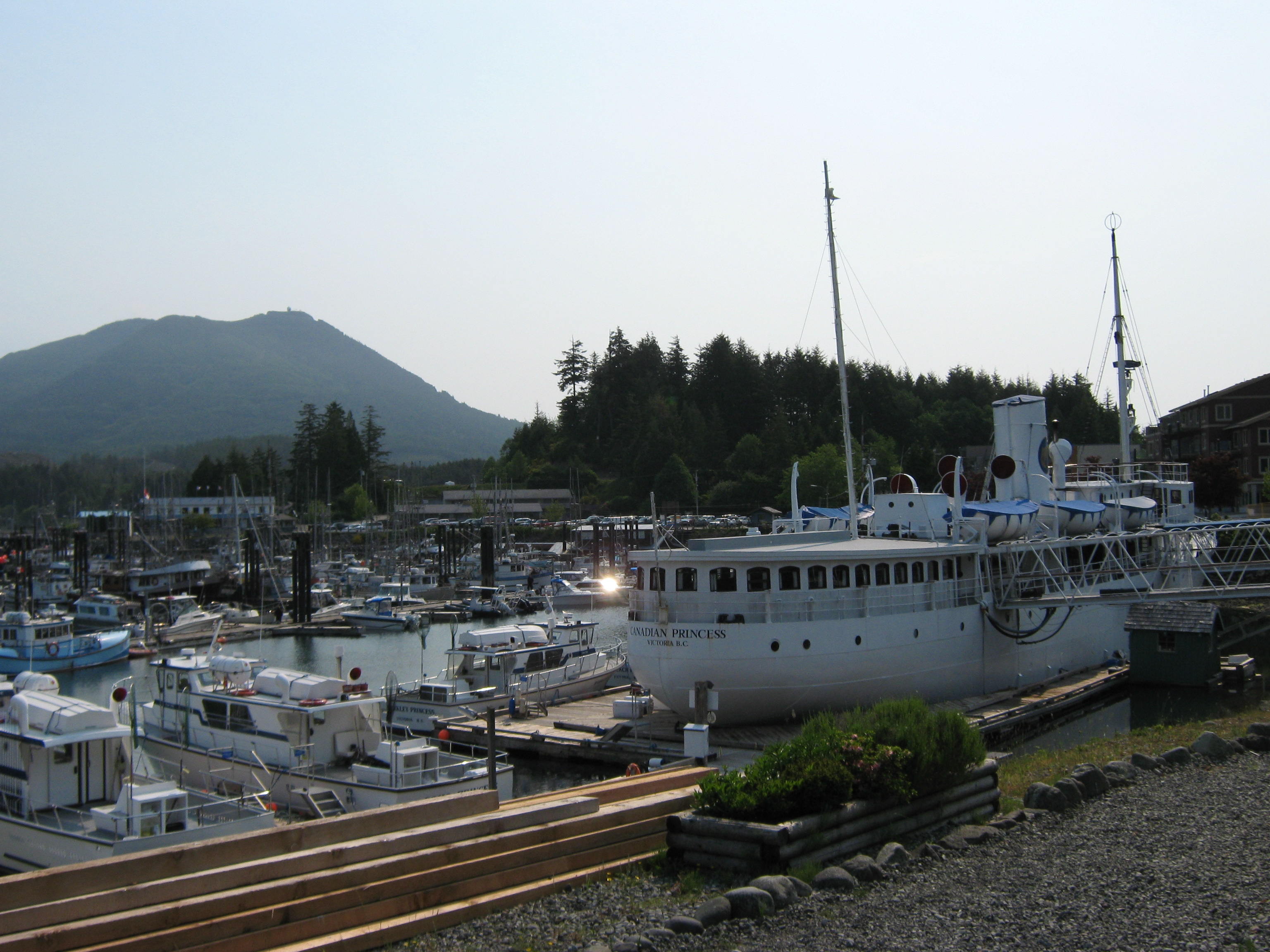
Boats in Ucluelet Harbour

Archaeological evidence indicates the presence of First Nations along the outer west coast of Vancouver Island from at least 4,300 years ago. British Columbia's recorded history began with European explorers searching for the Northwest Passage.

Juan Pérez anchored and traded in 1774 on the west coast of Vancouver Island, at Nootka Sound, 100 km (62 mi) north of Ucluelet. In 1775, Juan Francisco de la Bodega y Quadra sailed along the coast of Vancouver Island, heading north for Alaska. He did not stop, but roughly charted the coast in the vicinity of Kyuquot Sound. Captain James Cook of the British Navy anchored in Nootka Sound and went ashore in 1778. Maritime fur traders followed, such as Charles William Barkley, captain of the Imperial Eagle, who in 1787 arrived near Ucluelet harbour in Barkley Sound in search of sea otter pelts.

In 1870, fur sealers came to the area seeking ports for vessels working the Bering Sea sealing grounds. Captain Francis, the owner of several sealing schooners, established a trading post in Ucluelet harbour. Ucluelet began to grow along with the sealing industry and became a bustling town. In the 1890s, more settlers began arriving on the news of pending road access from Port Alberni. Fishing was excellent and gold was to be found on Florencia Bay. Gold was found, but it was so fine and in such little quantity that it could not be worked profitably.

Artist Emily Carr spent time on First Nations territories in and around Ucluelet in the late 1890s, creating a series of drawings documenting life in the village.

The Presbyterian Church built a Mission House and school and a doctor was dispatched to the area in 1898. By 1900, more settlers had moved to the west coast of Vancouver Island. Development began bringing more infrastructure and services. The Canadian Pacific Railway operated a small freight boat sailing from Victoria three times a month. In 1903, a whaling station was established in Barkley Sound.

On 26 December 1905, while attempting to enter the Strait of Juan de Fuca in a strong southwest gale, a 2,346-ton steel-hulled four-masted barque, The Pass of Melfort, was wrecked east of Amphitrite Point. None of the 35 people aboard the vessel survived the sinking; 26 bodies were recovered and interred in a small cemetery northwest of Ucluelet. A nearby residential street, off Peninsula Road, is named after the ship. Following the disaster, the first lighthouse – a small wooden tower – was built at Amphitrite Point in 1906. This was destroyed in bad weather in 1914, and the current concrete Amphitrite Point Lighthouse opened in March 1915. A government telegraph office and a lifeboat station were also built. As World War I began, the local fishing industry had started to develop.

When World War II began, the Government of Canada took measures to protect Vancouver Island's west coast from potential invasions. The military established a seaplane base in Ucluelet and a land base at Long Beach. The road to Tofino, which had been worked on for thirty years, was finally completed.

In 1941, the Direction Finding capabilities at RCAF station Ucluelet (Long Beach) were placed at the disposal of the Royal Canadian Navy. In 1942, RCN operators at Ucluelet, Coal Harbour and Alliford Bay were transferred to Gordon Head in Victoria.

Ucluelet continued to prosper after the war luring more residents hoping for prosperity to the region. In August 1959, the long-awaited road to Port Alberni was finally opened.

On 26 February 1952, Ucluelet became incorporated. Its status was changed to a District in 1997 to reflect, in part, the increasing population and increasing importance within the region.

== Climate ==
Ucluelet has an oceanic climate (Köppen Cfb) of the type found in Ireland, with mild, rainy winters and cool summers owing to its coastal location. As such, temperatures that are outside the range of −10–30 °C (14.0–86.0 °F) are rare. Precipitation is high, averaging around 3,350 mm (132 in) per year, with most of it concentrated in the winter months. Even so, precipitation is significant in all months with no month averaging below 70 mm (3 in) of precipitation. Although it has an average snowfall of 32.4 cm (12.8 in), the median is 0, meaning over 50% of years do not experience a single snowfall; this makes this climate unique in Canada.

The highest temperature ever recorded in Ucluelet was 36.0 °C (97 °F) on 28 June 2021. The lowest temperature ever recorded was −13.9 °C (7 °F) on 29 January 1917.

Climate data for Ucluelet, 1981–2010 normals, extremes 1914–present
Month	Jan	Feb	Mar	Apr	May	Jun	Jul	Aug	Sep	Oct	Nov	Dec	Year
Record high °C (°F)	16.7 (62.1)	20.0 (68.0)	23.5 (74.3)	25.6 (78.1)	29.4 (84.9)	36.0 (96.8)	34.0 (93.2)	34.4 (93.9)	30.0 (86.0)	26.5 (79.7)	20.0 (68.0)	17.2 (63.0)	36.0 (96.8)
Mean daily maximum °C (°F)	8.4 (47.1)	9.2 (48.6)	10.3 (50.5)	12.4 (54.3)	15.0 (59.0)	17.1 (62.8)	19.0 (66.2)	19.1 (66.4)	18.2 (64.8)	13.9 (57.0)	10.4 (50.7)	8.5 (47.3)	13.5 (56.3)
Daily mean °C (°F)	5.5 (41.9)	5.5 (41.9)	6.6 (43.9)	8.4 (47.1)	10.9 (51.6)	13.2 (55.8)	15.0 (59.0)	15.0 (59.0)	13.7 (56.7)	10.2 (50.4)	7.2 (45.0)	5.5 (41.9)	9.7 (49.5)
Mean daily minimum °C (°F)	2.6 (36.7)	1.8 (35.2)	2.8 (37.0)	4.3 (39.7)	6.7 (44.1)	9.2 (48.6)	10.9 (51.6)	11.0 (51.8)	9.2 (48.6)	6.4 (43.5)	4.0 (39.2)	2.6 (36.7)	6.0 (42.8)
Record low °C (°F)	−13.9 (7.0)	−11.0 (12.2)	−7.2 (19.0)	−5.0 (23.0)	−3.3 (26.1)	0.6 (33.1)	1.7 (35.1)	2.2 (36.0)	−1.1 (30.0)	−7.8 (18.0)	−9.5 (14.9)	−11.7 (10.9)	−13.9 (7.0)
Average precipitation mm (inches)	501.8 (19.76)	353.1 (13.90)	322.3 (12.69)	266.5 (10.49)	165.9 (6.53)	147.2 (5.80)	78.5 (3.09)	87.6 (3.45)	139.6 (5.50)	345.3 (13.59)	492.2 (19.38)	451.1 (17.76)	3,351.1 (131.93)
Average rainfall mm (inches)	495.0 (19.49)	343.8 (13.54)	316.4 (12.46)	265.8 (10.46)	165.9 (6.53)	147.2 (5.80)	78.5 (3.09)	87.6 (3.45)	139.6 (5.50)	345.2 (13.59)	489.2 (19.26)	444.4 (17.50)	3,318.7 (130.66)
Average snowfall cm (inches)	6.8 (2.7)	9.3 (3.7)	5.9 (2.3)	0.76 (0.30)	0.0 (0.0)	0.0 (0.0)	0.0 (0.0)	0.0 (0.0)	0.0 (0.0)	0.05 (0.02)	3.0 (1.2)	6.7 (2.6)	32.4 (12.8)
Average precipitation days (≥ 0.2 mm)	22.5	18.8	21.6	18.2	15.9	13.8	9.4	10.0	12.0	19.2	22.7	21.7	205.8
Average rainy days (≥ 0.2 mm)	22.3	18.5	21.4	18.2	15.9	13.8	9.4	10.0	12.0	19.2	22.5	21.5	204.7
Average snowy days (≥ 0.2 cm)	1.8	2.0	1.5	0.32	0.0	0.0	0.0	0.0	0.0	0.04	0.65	1.8	8.0
Source: Environment Canada

== Demographics ==
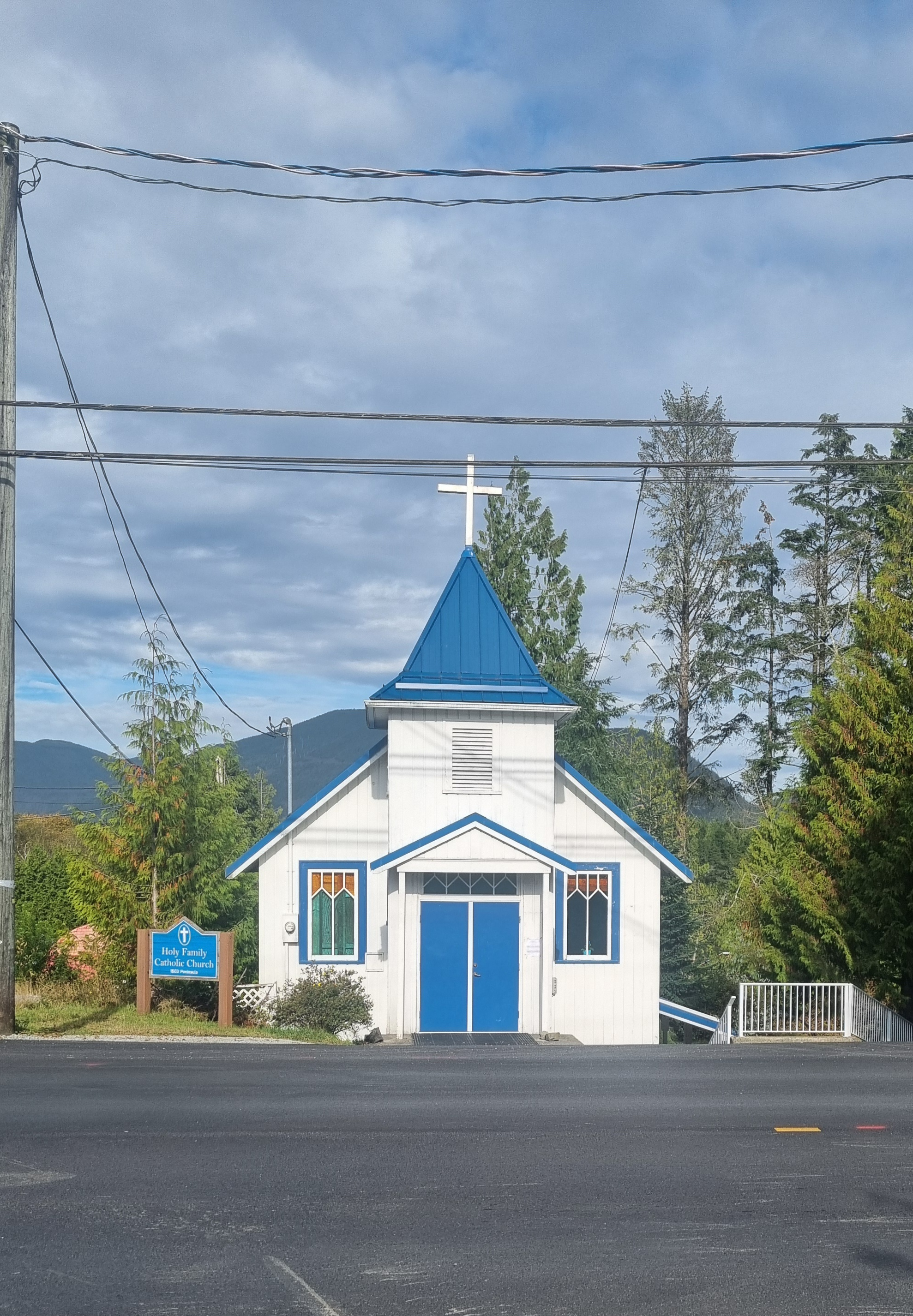
Church in Ucluelet

In the 2021 Census of Population conducted by Statistics Canada, Ucluelet had a population of 2,066 living in 860 of its 997 total private dwellings, a change of 20.3% from its 2016 population of 1,717. With a land area of 6.48 km^{2} (2.50 sq mi), it had a population density of 318.8/km^{2} (825.8/sq mi) in 2021.

Very important in local society is the presence of the Yuułuʔiłʔatḥ people ("people of the safe landing place" or "people of the safe harbour" in Nuu-chah-nulth), whose government is the Yuułuʔiłʔatḥ Government. Their government is located in Hitacu, which is located 15 km (9.3 mi) from the town of Ucluelet by road but just 1 km (0.62 mi) across the bay.

Both Ucluelet and nearby Tofino have become target sites for the construction of resorts, restaurants and adventure tourism centres. Although the local population has historically been based on fishing and logging, increasing numbers of seasonal residents pass through both communities to work in the tourism and hospitality industry.

=== Ethnicity ===
The ancestry of most residents is European (81%), Indigenous (9%), Japanese (4%), and Filipino (3%) populations.

=== Religion ===
According to the 2021 census, religious groups in Ucluelet included:

- Irreligion (1,405 persons or 70.8%)
- Christianity (415 persons or 20.9%)
- Buddhism (25 persons or 1.3%)
- Other (65 persons or 3.3%)

== Health and education ==
Public education is offered by School District 70 Pacific Rim, through the Ucluelet Elementary School and Ucluelet Secondary School. Health services are provided in town by the Ucluelet Medical Clinic and larger facilities are located in Tofino and Port Alberni; all are operated by the Vancouver Island Health Authority (VIHA).

== Transportation ==
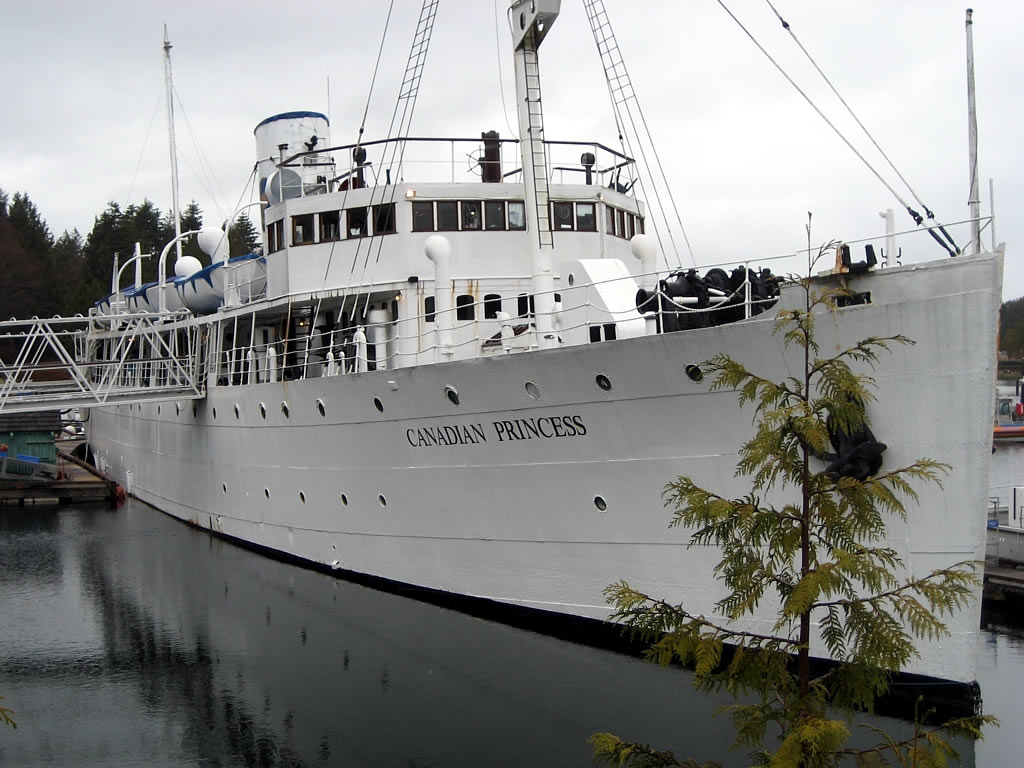
The Canadian Princess was moored and part of a hotel in Ucluelet, and was a staple of the harbour until it was removed in 2016.

Ucluelet has an airport, Tofino Ucluelet Airport, about twenty minutes drive from town. Long Beach Airport is accessible to small passenger planes and the harbour in Ucluelet, Ucluelet Water Aerodrome, is accessible to floatplanes. Coastal fog is a common morning phenomenon in the summer, complicating access by air until the weather clears.

Accessing Ucluelet by car is via Highway 4 from Port Alberni. Vehicles are required to use winter tires or carry chains from 1 October to 31 March on this route. Tofino Bus also services Ucluelet from Victoria, Vancouver, Nanaimo and Port Alberni. In the summer, Lady Rose Marine Services operates a ferry service from Port Alberni to Ucluelet and return several times per week.

== Tourism ==
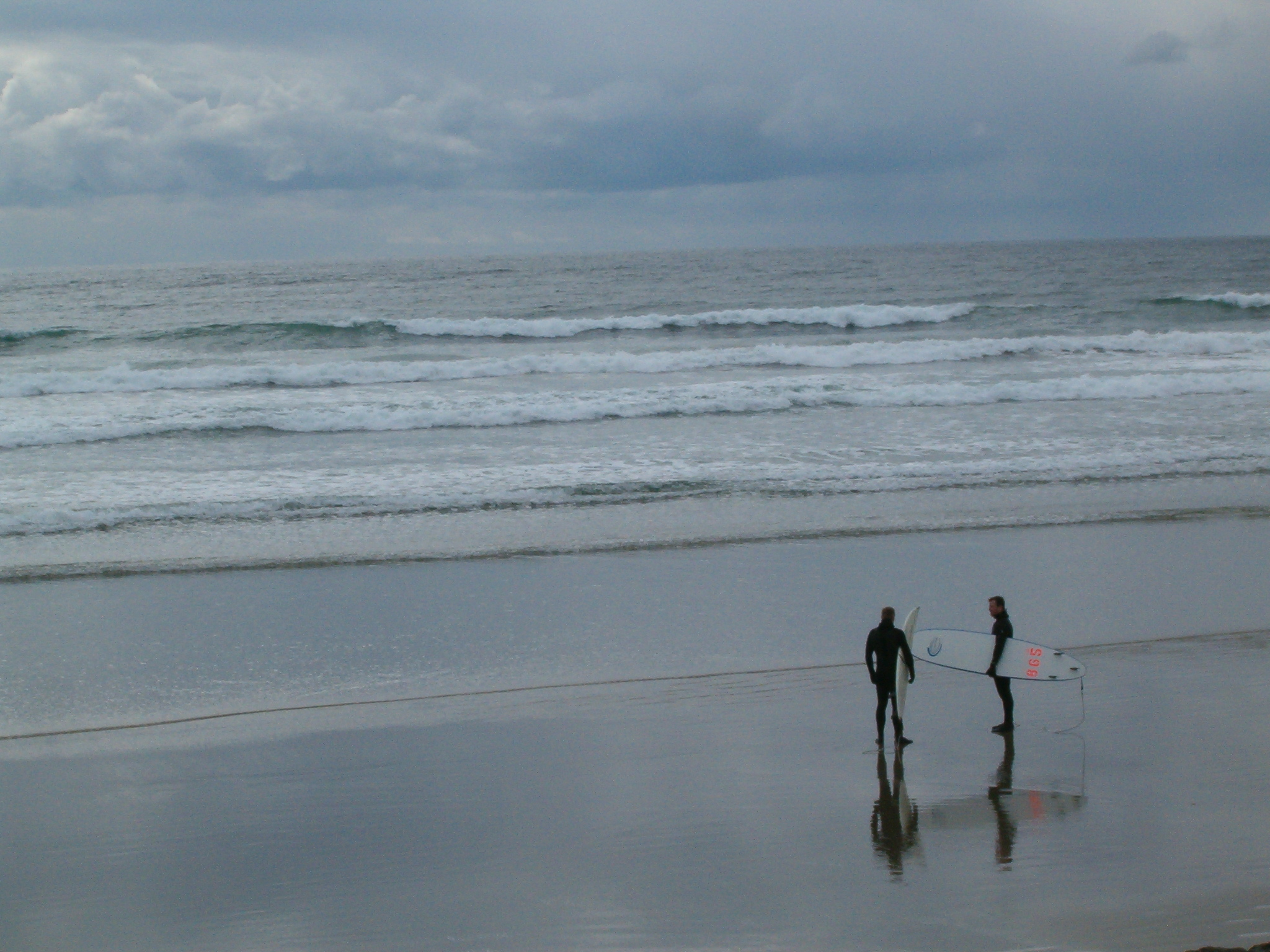
Surfers on one of Ucluelet's beaches

Like its neighbour Tofino, Ucluelet has made the transition from a resource-based economy to a year-round tourism-based economy. The Pacific Rim Visitor Centre is the second-most-visited Tourism Centre, after Victoria, on Vancouver Island, and on average receives 90,000 visitors from around the world to the Pacific Rim National Park, Ucluelet and Tofino area.

Tourist activities include surfing, stand-up paddle board, fishing, whale watching, bear watching, kayaking, canoeing, camping, hiking, biking, swimming, and beachcombing. Storm watching is also an activity during the November to March season.

=== Activities ===
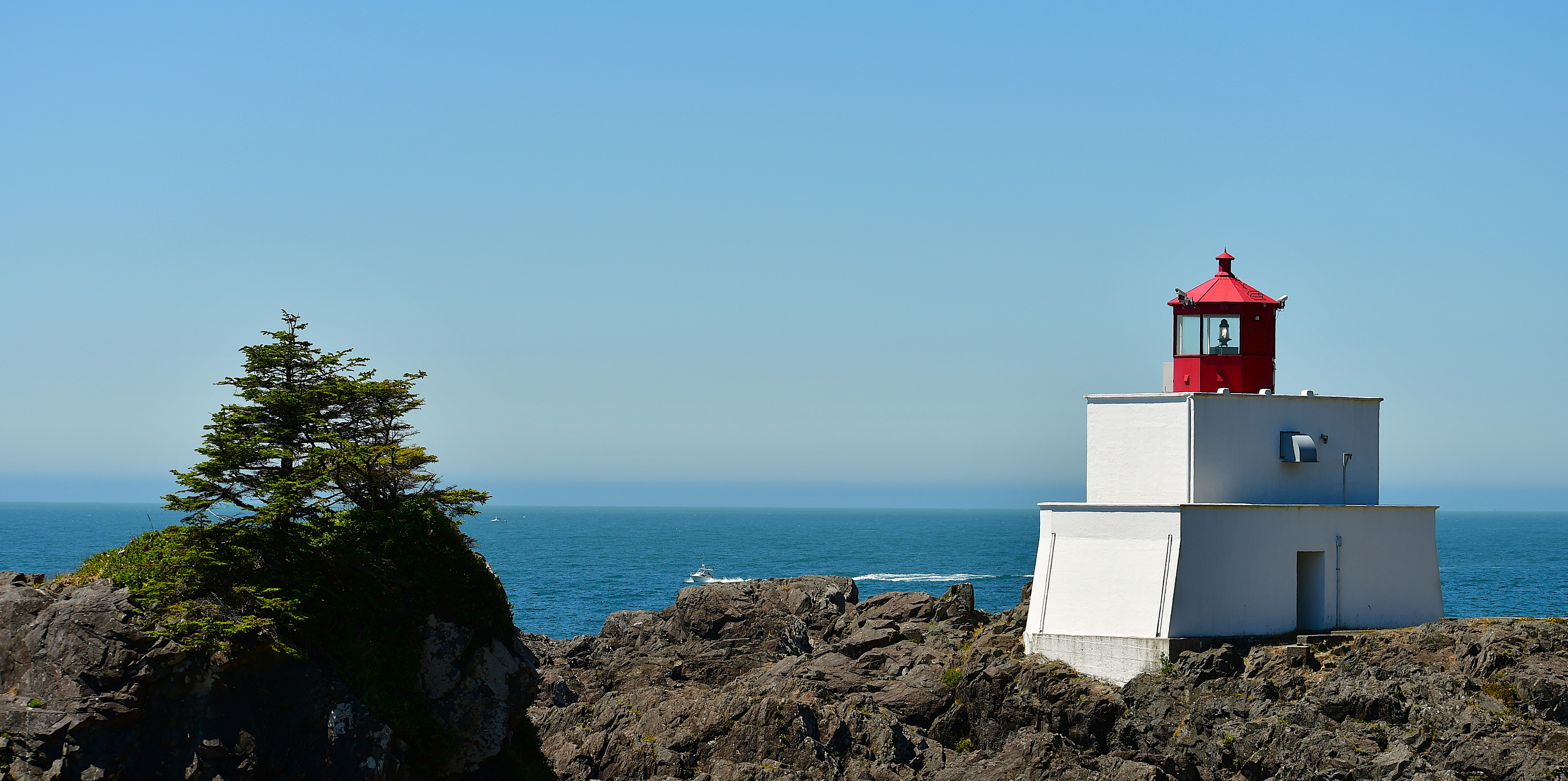
The Amphrite Point Lighthouse, seen from the Wild Pacific Trail

The Wild Pacific Trail begins near the mouth of Ucluelet Inlet at Amphitrite Point Lighthouse and travels north along the open Pacific coastline through Big Beach Park to the bike path just outside Ucluelet. The final section will extend the trail to Halfmoon Bay in the Pacific Rim National Park Reserve. The trail is accessible to all ages and abilities, even wheelchairs in certain areas. No bikes, horses or motorized vehicles are permitted on the park's beaches or trails. The hiking trails are designed to let visitors experience the shoreline while preventing damage to the fragile environment.

Various marine tours are available including sea kayaking, canoeing in the inlet, whale and wildlife watching. There has been an ongoing interest in sport fishing out of Ucluelet and there are many chartered sports fishing options in town. Surfing has become a popular activity among tourists and locals alike. In the summer months, surfers gather along Florencia Bay, Wickaninnish Beach and Long Beach in the Pacific Rim National Park Reserve.

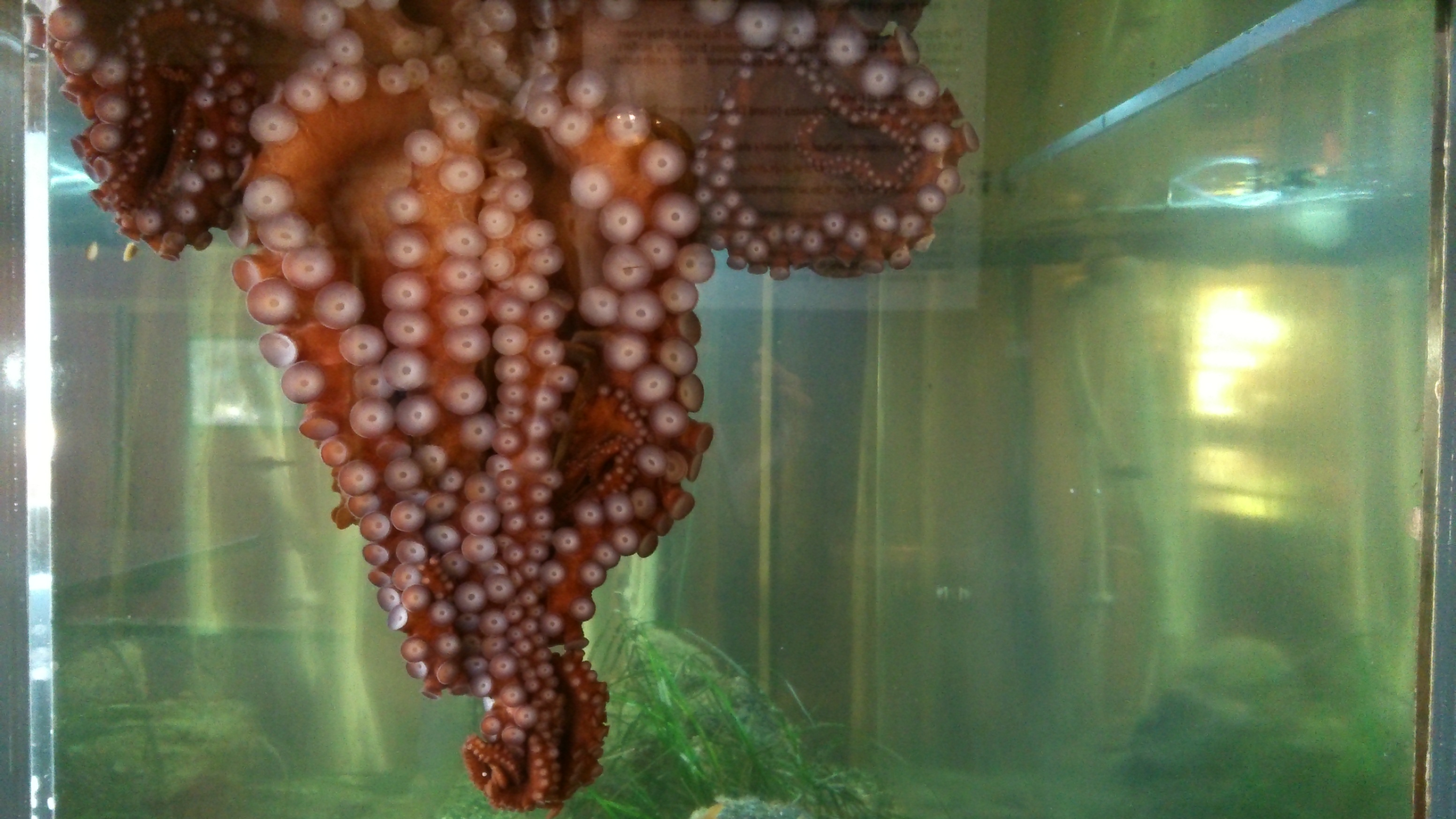
A giant Pacific octopus in Ucluelet Aquarium

In 2012, the catch-and-release public Ucluelet Aquarium moved into its new building on Main Street by the Ferry Ramp, displaying the local marine biodiversity with a wide variety of fish and invertebrates.

Mt. Ozzard, which hosts the Coast Guard Marine Communication and Traffic Services (MCTS) surveillance radar dome and various other communications towers, has a service road that is gated at the bottom. Despite the gate, the road to the summit is accessible to hikers and all-terrain vehicles. The MCTS centre at Amphitrite Point was closed in May 2015 and its services relocated to Prince Rupert.

== Festivals and events ==
Every March, the Pacific Rim Whale Festival is a week of events hosted by Ucluelet, Tofino and the Pacific Rim National Park Reserve. With a strong focus on marine life protection education, the event celebrates the annual return of migrating Pacific Grey Whales from their breeding and calving grounds along the Baja Peninsula of Mexico. Community events within the festival include gala dinners, children's activities, workshops and live entertainment.

Every odd year, Ucluelet hosts a leg of the Van Isle 360. It is a point-to-point race circumnavigating Vancouver Island, sailed in 10 legs. While the participants are in Ucluelet, the community hosts a special salmon barbecue with live music and a send-off event.

In mid-June, there is the Annual Edge to Edge Marathon. Every year participants from within the community and beyond race from Tofino through the Pacific Rim National Park Reserve to Ucluelet.

The Pacific Rim Summer Festival is held in early July with two weeks of music, word and multi-cultural concerts featuring national and international performers. Nightly concerts are performed at venues in Ucluelet, Tofino and the Pacific Rim National Park Reserve.

The end of July or the last weekend are Ukee Days, a local celebration with several events such as a salmon barbecue on Friday, pancake breakfast and town parade on Saturday and a Ukee Days dance.

== See also ==
- List of francophone communities in British Columbia
