= Results breakdown of the 2021 Canadian federal election =

2021 election for members of the Canadian Parliament's House of Commons

2021 Canadian federal election
- September 20, 2021
- All 338 seats in the House of Commons of Canada; 170 seats needed for a majority
- Turnout: 62.25%
Party	Leader	Vote %	Seats	+/–
Liberal	Justin Trudeau	32.6%	160	+3
Conservative	Erin O'Toole	33.7%	119	−2
Bloc Québécois	Yves-François Blanchet	7.6%	32	0
New Democratic	Jagmeet Singh	17.8%	25	+1
Green	Annamie Paul	2.3%	2	−1
This lists parties that won seats. See the complete results below.
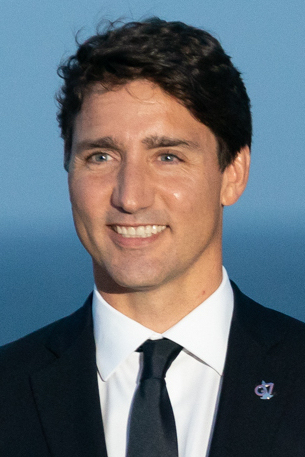

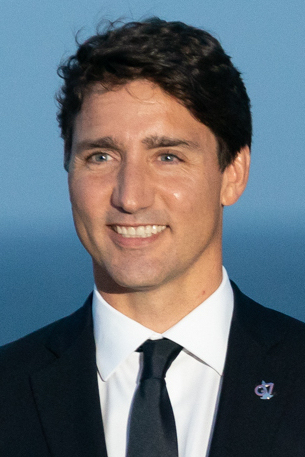
Prime Minister before	Prime Minister after
Justin Trudeau; Liberal	Justin Trudeau; Liberal

The 2021 Canadian federal election was held on September 20, 2021, to elect members of the House of Commons to the 44th Canadian Parliament. The Liberal Party of Canada was returned once more with a minority of the seats, and the composition of the House saw very little change.

== Summary ==
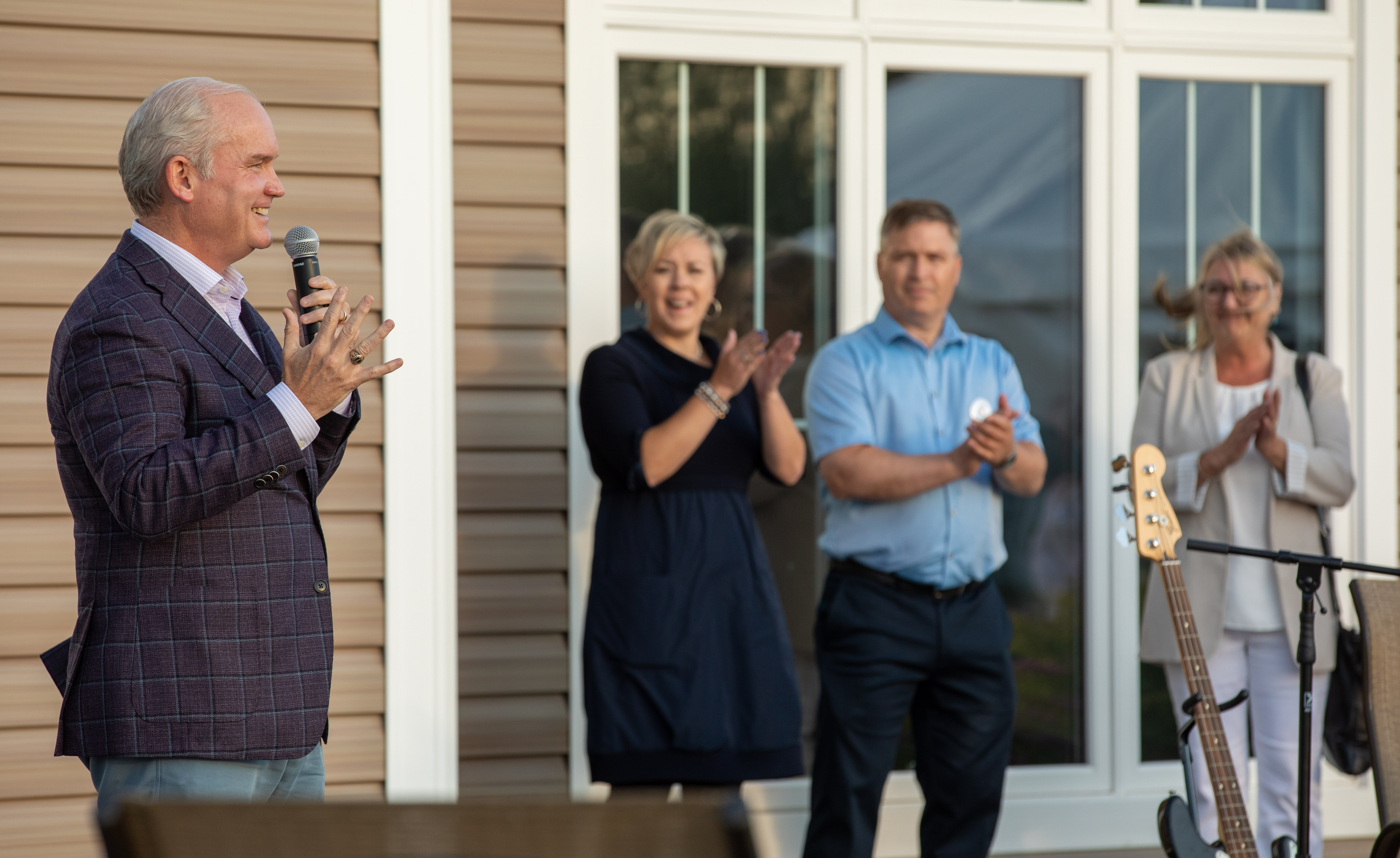
Conservative Party leader Erin O'Toole, furthest left, campaigning with candidates in Newfoundland

The election was described as being "like a game of tug of war in which the rope won." The remarkable similarity of the seat results and those in 2019 may have reinforced voters' sentiments that the early election was unnecessary, and its meagre outcome has left its mark on the electorate. Both the Liberals and Conservatives saw marginal declines in their national shares of the votes.

Compared to 2019, Tory holds in Western Canada and Liberal ones in the GTA both declined, although one Conservative observer noted, "I am far more encouraged by the narrowing of margins in the suburbs, than I am discouraged or concerned by an Alberta MP only winning by 30,000 votes".

The Green Party saw its share of the vote collapse to 2.3%, its lowest level since the 2000 federal election. Internal dissension and poor morale contributed to the decline, and Elizabeth May called for an inquiry to determine the underlying reasons for it. Paul announced her resignation as party leader on September 27, which took effect on November 14, after being officially accepted by the party's federal council.

In late November, the Greens released a report indicating that they were facing imminent insolvency, and were considering closing the Ottawa office. The party had lost 499 monthly donors since July 2021, and 6,259 members in the same length of time.

The increase of the People's Party share from 1.6% to 4.9% may have cost the Conservatives at least ten ridings. Votes obtained by individual PPC candidates were larger than the margin of victory in 21 ridings, where the Conservative candidate was in second place (12 in Ontario, five in BC, two in Alberta, one in Quebec and one in Newfoundland). Of those seats, 14 went to the Liberals, six to the NDP, and one to the Bloc. Observers noted that a significant amount of PPC support arose from non-Conservative voters.

Eight ridings were won by a margin of 1% or less, and judicial recounts were requested in four of them. One riding flipped from the Bloc to the Liberals, one Bloc victory was confirmed, and two proceedings were terminated when it became obvious that no change would occur.

== Synopsis of results ==
Canadian federal election results (September 20, 2021)
↓
160	119	32	25	2
Liberal	Conservative	BQ	NDP	G

Expected arrangement of elected MPs in the House of Commons

Cartogram of the 2021 Canadian federal election results using equal-area ridings

Results by riding — 2021 Canadian federal election
Riding	Prov/ Terr	2019	Winning party					Turnout (Note: including spoilt ballots)	Votes (Note: minor political parties receiving less than 1% of the national popular vote are aggregated under "Other"; independent candidates are aggregated separately)								
Riding	Prov/ Terr	2019	Party	Votes	Share	Margin #	Margin %	Turnout	Lib	Con	NDP	BQ	Green	PPC	Ind	Other	Total
Banff—Airdrie	AB	Con	Con	43,677	56.7%	31,195	40.5%	69.4%	9,572	43,677	12,482	–	1,405	5,808	2,569	1,475	76,988
Battle River—Crowfoot	AB	Con	Con	41,819	71.3%	36,058	61.5%	73.2%	2,515	41,819	5,761	–	554	5,440	–	2,571	58,660
Bow River	AB	Con	Con	35,676	69.8%	30,568	59.8%	63.5%	3,869	35,676	4,726	–	–	5,108	–	1,759	51,138
Calgary Centre	AB	Con	Con	30,375	51.3%	12,782	21.6%	63.0%	17,593	30,375	9,694	–	971	–	–	575	59,208
Calgary Confederation	AB	Con	Con	28,367	46.0%	10,807	17.5%	68.0%	17,560	28,367	10,561	–	2,295	2,670	–	178	61,631
Calgary Forest Lawn	AB	Con	Con	15,434	44.5%	5,826	16.8%	48.2%	9,608	15,434	6,254	–	699	2,468	–	185	34,648
Calgary Heritage	AB	Con	Con	30,870	57.7%	21,550	40.3%	66.4%	8,960	30,870	9,320	–	766	2,682	–	944	53,542
Calgary Midnapore	AB	Con	Con	39,147	60.7%	27,321	42.4%	68.1%	7,947	39,147	11,826	–	868	3,930	–	812	64,530
Calgary Nose Hill	AB	Con	Con	28,001	55.6%	17,690	35.1%	61.2%	10,311	28,001	8,500	–	636	2,324	–	621	50,393
Calgary Rocky Ridge	AB	Con	Con	36,034	54.5%	21,341	32.3%	66.3%	14,693	36,034	10,748	–	1,052	3,003	–	554	66,084
Calgary Shepard	AB	Con	Con	44,411	60.4%	32,308	43.9%	64.2%	10,303	44,411	12,103	–	1,300	4,284	228	930	73,559
Calgary Signal Hill	AB	Con	Con	35,217	59.0%	24,111	40.4%	67.4%	11,106	35,217	8,863	–	1,094	2,859	–	568	59,707
Calgary Skyview	AB	Con	Lib	20,092	42.4%	2,981	6.3%	54.9%	20,092	17,111	7,690	–	432	1,720	184	204	47,433
Edmonton Centre	AB	Con	Lib	16,560	33.7%	615	1.3%	62.8%	16,560	15,945	14,171	–	–	2,094	–	378	49,148
Edmonton Griesbach	AB	Con	NDP	17,457	40.5%	1,500	3.4%	53.7%	5,979	15,957	17,457	–	538	2,617	–	511	43,059
Edmonton Manning	AB	Con	Con	20,219	41.1%	5,220	10.6%	55.4%	10,468	20,219	14,999	–	–	3,407	–	133	49,226
Edmonton Mill Woods	AB	Con	Con	18,392	37.9%	1,893	3.9%	63.4%	16,499	18,392	10,553	–	–	2,898	–	172	48,514
Edmonton Riverbend	AB	Con	Con	25,702	45.1%	11,533	20.2%	66.1%	14,169	25,702	14,154	–	761	2,142	–	–	56,928
Edmonton Strathcona	AB	NDP	NDP	31,690	60.7%	18,380	35.2%	69.4%	3,948	13,310	31,690	–	634	2,366	–	275	52,223
Edmonton West	AB	Con	Con	25,278	45.1%	11,088	19.8%	62.1%	13,016	25,278	14,190	–	–	3,354	–	151	55,989
Edmonton—Wetaskiwin	AB	Con	Con	48,340	55.7%	30,081	34.7%	66.5%	12,229	48,340	18,259	–	–	7,670	–	345	86,843
Foothills	AB	Con	Con	44,456	69.2%	37,339	58.1%	72.8%	4,441	44,456	7,117	–	802	5,111	–	2,289	64,216
Fort McMurray—Cold Lake	AB	Con	Con	29,242	67.8%	23,761	55.1%	56.5%	3,060	29,242	4,377	–	423	5,481	–	567	43,150
Grande Prairie-Mackenzie	AB	Con	Con	36,361	68.4%	29,899	56.2%	64.4%	2,397	36,361	6,462	–	–	5,411	–	2,509	53,140
Lakeland	AB	Con	Con	36,557	69.4%	30,730	58.3%	68.0%	2,610	36,557	5,519	–	464	5,827	–	1,674	52,651
Lethbridge	AB	Con	Con	32,817	55.6%	21,431	36.3%	66.1%	8,928	32,817	11,386	–	–	4,097	1,179	566	58,973
Medicine Hat—Cardston—Warner	AB	Con	Con	31,648	65.4%	24,832	51.3%	61.5%	3,515	31,648	6,816	–	725	4,484	–	1,226	48,414
Peace River—Westlock	AB	Con	Con	29,486	63.0%	23,467	50.1%	63.2%	2,431	29,486	6,019	–	364	5,916	–	2,573	46,789
Red Deer—Lacombe	AB	Con	Con	39,805	64.2%	30,999	50.0%	66.2%	3,704	39,805	8,806	–	–	7,893	573	1,198	61,979
Red Deer—Mountain View	AB	Con	Con	40,680	64.2%	31,854	50.3%	71.1%	4,084	40,680	8,826	–	–	7,581	298	1,851	63,320
Sherwood Park—Fort Saskatchewan	AB	Con	Con	41,092	57.6%	26,352	37.0%	73.9%	8,730	41,092	14,740	–	700	5,004	283	849	71,398
St. Albert—Edmonton	AB	Con	Con	29,652	47.6%	11,836	19.0%	66.3%	11,188	29,652	17,816	–	–	3,684	–	–	62,340
Sturgeon River—Parkland	AB	Con	Con	40,957	61.6%	28,425	42.7%	70.6%	4,579	40,957	12,532	–	–	6,671	–	1,737	66,476
Yellowhead	AB	Con	Con	33,603	66.2%	27,128	53.5%	69.2%	2,829	33,603	5,977	–	–	6,475	–	1,908	50,792
Abbotsford	BC	Con	Con	21,597	47.9%	10,690	23.7%	59.6%	10,907	21,597	7,729	–	1,517	3,300	–	–	45,050
Burnaby North—Seymour	BC	Lib	Lib	19,445	39.5%	5,127	10.4%	62.3%	19,445	12,535	14,318	–	1,516	1,370	–	–	49,184
Burnaby South	BC	NDP	NDP	16,382	40.3%	4,021	9.9%	51.1%	12,361	9,104	16,382	–	1,175	1,290	296	–	40,608
Cariboo—Prince George	BC	Con	Con	25,771	50.8%	15,448	30.4%	59.8%	8,397	25,771	10,323	–	1,844	4,160	–	218	50,713
Central Okanagan—Similkameen—Nicola	BC	Con	Con	30,563	47.6%	16,750	26.1%	64.6%	13,291	30,563	13,813	–	1,755	4,788	–	–	64,210
Chilliwack—Hope	BC	Con	Con	23,987	46.0%	10,060	19.3%	61.4%	8,851	23,987	13,927	–	1,391	4,004	–	–	52,160
Cloverdale—Langley City	BC	Con	Lib	20,877	39.2%	1,654	3.1%	61.0%	20,877	19,223	10,587	–	–	2,563	–	–	53,250
Coquitlam—Port Coquitlam	BC	Lib	Lib	21,454	38.5%	4,547	8.2%	60.1%	21,454	16,907	14,982	–	–	2,373	–	–	55,716
Courtenay—Alberni	BC	NDP	NDP	30,612	44.2%	8,431	12.2%	65.8%	9,276	22,181	30,612	–	3,590	3,467	–	124	69,250
Cowichan—Malahat—Langford	BC	NDP	NDP	26,968	42.8%	9,098	14.4%	64.4%	10,320	17,870	26,968	–	3,922	3,952	–	–	63,032
Delta	BC	Lib	Lib	22,105	42.3%	4,410	8.5%	67.5%	22,105	17,695	9,591	–	1,244	1,291	379	–	52,305
Esquimalt—Saanich—Sooke	BC	NDP	NDP	28,056	42.8%	13,590	20.7%	64.4%	14,466	13,885	28,056	–	5,891	2,995	–	249	65,542
Fleetwood—Port Kells	BC	Lib	Lib	21,350	45.2%	6,797	14.4%	58.7%	21,350	14,553	8,960	–	892	1,284	146	–	47,185
Kamloops—Thompson—Cariboo	BC	Con	Con	30,281	43.0%	9,850	14.0%	66.5%	12,717	30,281	20,431	–	2,576	4,033	410	–	70,448
Kelowna—Lake Country	BC	Con	Con	30,409	45.3%	12,642	18.8%	63.9%	17,767	30,409	12,204	–	2,074	4,688	–	–	67,142
Kootenay—Columbia	BC	Con	Con	28,056	43.2%	4,070	6.3%	68.3%	5,879	28,056	23,986	–	2,577	4,467	–	–	64,965
Langley—Aldergrove	BC	Con	Con	28,643	45.7%	12,078	19.3%	65.0%	16,565	28,643	12,288	–	1,798	3,341	–	–	62,635
Mission—Matsqui—Fraser Canyon	BC	Con	Con	18,908	43.8%	8,310	19.3%	61.5%	10,598	18,908	8,709	–	1,887	3,073	–	–	43,175
Nanaimo—Ladysmith	BC	Grn	NDP	19,826	28.8%	1,199	1.7%	64.0%	9,314	18,627	19,826	–	17,640	3,358	–	–	68,765
New Westminster—Burnaby	BC	NDP	NDP	24,054	48.8%	12,369	25.1%	57.1%	11,685	9,710	24,054	–	2,035	1,840	–	–	49,324
North Island—Powell River	BC	NDP	NDP	23,833	39.5%	2,163	3.5%	65.4%	7,922	21,670	23,833	–	3,656	2,795	–	387	60,263
North Okanagan—Shuswap	BC	Con	Con	33,626	46.4%	19,697	27.2%	65.2%	13,666	33,626	13,929	–	3,967	7,209	–	–	72,397
North Vancouver	BC	Lib	Lib	26,756	45.1%	10,085	17.0%	66.1%	26,756	16,671	11,750	–	2,598	1,545	–	–	59,320
Pitt Meadows—Maple Ridge	BC	Con	Con	19,371	36.7%	2,502	4.8%	64.4%	13,179	19,371	16,869	–	–	2,800	453	161	52,833
Port Moody—Coquitlam	BC	Con	NDP	19,367	37.2%	2,762	5.3%	62.7%	14,231	16,605	19,367	–	–	1,766	–	122	52,091
Prince George—Peace River—Northern Rockies	BC	Con	Con	29,882	60.7%	23,235	47.2%	62.1 %	4,236	29,882	6,647	–	1,661	5,138	–	1,633	49,197
Richmond Centre	BC	Con	Lib	13,440	39.3%	772	2.2%	46.2%	13,440	12,668	6,196	–	1,109	748	–	–	34,161
Saanich—Gulf Islands	BC	Grn	Grn	24,648	37.6%	9,873	15.1%	70.4%	12,056	14,775	11,959	–	24,648	1,943	–	141	65,522
Skeena—Bulkley Valley	BC	NDP	NDP	15,921	42.6%	2,408	6.5%	55.7%	2,866	13,513	15,921	–	1,406	2,888	–	797	37,391
South Okanagan—West Kootenay	BC	NDP	NDP	27,595	41.3%	3,920	5.8%	65.6%	8,159	23,675	27,595	–	2,485	4,866	–	–	66,780
South Surrey—White Rock	BC	Con	Con	24,158	42.5%	1,992	3.5%	65.0%	22,166	24,158	8,395	–	–	2,186	–	–	56,905
Steveston—Richmond East	BC	Con	Lib	16,543	42.5%	3,477	9.0%	52.8%	16,543	13,066	7,525	–	860	955	–	–	38,949
Surrey Centre	BC	Lib	Lib	16,862	43.9%	6,235	16.2%	51.7%	16,862	8,094	10,627	–	838	1,539	–	426	38,386
Surrey—Newton	BC	Lib	Lib	19,721	53.9%	10,185	27.9%	56.2%	19,721	5,758	9,536	–	–	967	628	–	36,610
Vancouver Centre	BC	Lib	Lib	20,873	40.4%	5,004	9.7%	57.0%	20,873	11,162	15,869	–	2,030	1,683	–	–	51,617
Vancouver East	BC	NDP	NDP	27,969	56.4%	18,172	36.6%	55.0%	9,797	5,399	27,969	–	3,826	1,382	–	1,218	49,591
Vancouver Granville	BC	Ind	Lib	17,050	34.4%	431	0.9%	60.8%	17,050	13,280	16,619	–	1,434	1,177	–	–	49,560
Vancouver Kingsway	BC	NDP	NDP	20,994	52.3%	9,972	24.9%	54.1%	11,022	5,456	20,994	–	1,575	868	–	243	40,158
Vancouver Quadra	BC	Lib	Lib	20,814	43.6%	7,028	14.7%	63.5%	20,814	13,786	9,220	–	2,922	963	–	–	47,705
Vancouver South	BC	Lib	Lib	19,910	49.4%	9,988	24.8%	54.8%	19,910	9,060	9,922	–	–	1,104	–	287	40,283
Victoria	BC	NDP	NDP	29,301	43.9%	11,107	16.6%	67.3%	18,194	9,152	29,301	–	7,472	2,065	–	564	66,748
West Vancouver—Sunshine Coast—Sea to Sky Country	BC	Lib	Lib	21,500	33.9%	2,438	3.9%	64.9%	21,500	19,062	16,265	–	4,108	2,299	127	98	63,459
Brandon—Souris	MB	Con	Con	22,733	59.6%	14,895	39.1%	61.9%	4,608	22,733	7,838	–	–	2,981	–	–	38,160
Charleswood—St. James—Assiniboia—Headingley	MB	Con	Con	18,111	40.0%	460	1.0%	69.7%	17,651	18,111	6,974	–	947	1,594	–	–	45,277
Churchill—Keewatinook Aski	MB	NDP	NDP	7,632	42.6%	3,118	17.4%	36.6%	4,514	4,330	7,632	–	552	899	–	–	17,927
Dauphin—Swan River—Neepawa	MB	Con	Con	22,718	59.0%	17,040	44.3%	62.2%	4,892	22,718	5,678	–	835	4,052	–	339	38,514
Elmwood—Transcona	MB	NDP	NDP	20,791	49.7%	9,023	21.6%	59.9%	6,169	11,768	20,791	–	676	2,435	–	–	41,839
Kildonan—St. Paul	MB	Con	Con	18,375	41.8%	5,441	12.4%	66.1%	12,934	18,375	10,313	–	–	2,325	–	–	43,947
Portage—Lisgar	MB	Con	Con	23,819	52.5%	14,029	30.9%	67.0%	4,967	23,819	6,068	–	–	9,790	–	712	45,356
Provencher	MB	Con	Con	24,294	48.7%	15,823	31.7%	67.5%	8,471	24,294	6,270	–	1,273	8,227	1,366	–	49,901
Saint Boniface—Saint Vital	MB	Lib	Lib	19,908	43.8%	7,159	15.8%	66.3%	19,908	12,749	9,767	–	676	1,978	294	97	45,469
Selkirk—Interlake—Eastman	MB	Con	Con	28,308	57.1%	18,704	37.7%	66.2%	6,567	28,308	9,604	–	1,328	3,800	–	–	49,607
Winnipeg Centre	MB	NDP	NDP	14,962	50.3%	6,516	21.9%	52.2%	8,446	3,818	14,962	–	708	1,229	–	586	29,749
Winnipeg North	MB	Lib	Lib	16,442	52.3%	7,444	23.7%	50.8%	16,442	4,126	8,998	–	418	1,315	–	109	31,408
Winnipeg South	MB	Lib	Lib	22,423	47.5%	6,456	13.7%	68.2%	22,423	15,967	6,632	–	681	1,542	–	–	47,245
Winnipeg South Centre	MB	Lib	Lib	22,214	45.5%	8,648	17.7%	69.8%	22,214	13,566	10,064	–	1,341	1,352	–	234	48,771
Acadie—Bathurst	NB	Lib	Lib	27,817	64.8%	21,901	51.0%	64.8%	27,817	5,916	4,906	–	1,203	2,531	–	549	42,922
Beauséjour	NB	Lib	Lib	27,313	55.6%	17,787	36.2%	68.0%	27,313	9,526	5,394	–	2,798	3,723	–	391	49,145
Fredericton	NB	Grn	Lib	16,316	37.0%	502	1.1%	67.2%	16,316	15,814	5,564	–	5,666	–	310	392	44,062
Fundy Royal	NB	Con	Con	21,460	48.4%	10,385	23.4%	66.7%	11,075	21,460	6,211	–	2,189	3,447	–	–	44,382
Madawaska—Restigouche	NB	Lib	Lib	16,854	55.2%	8,962	29.4%	61.6%	16,854	7,892	1,848	–	786	1,889	–	1,277	30,546
Miramichi—Grand Lake	NB	Lib	Con	14,218	43.7%	1,456	4.4%	67.3%	12,762	14,218	2,291	–	1,393	1,839	–	–	32,503
Moncton—Riverview—Dieppe	NB	Lib	Lib	22,460	49.1%	11,768	25.7%	61.7%	22,460	10,692	7,774	–	1,935	2,901	–	–	45,762
New Brunswick Southwest	NB	Con	Con	18,309	50.0%	9,559	26.1%	67.4%	8,750	18,309	4,893	–	1,587	3,090	–	–	36,629
Saint John—Rothesay	NB	Lib	Lib	17,375	46.4%	5,060	13.5%	59.3%	17,375	12,315	4,816	–	948	1,996	–	–	37,450
Tobique—Mactaquac	NB	Con	Con	17,536	51.0%	9,313	27.1%	62.0%	8,223	17,536	3,656	–	1,657	2,930	398	–	34,400
Avalon	NL	Lib	Lib	18,608	50.1%	5,870	15.8%	53.3%	18,608	12,738	5,151	–	–	647	–	–	37,144
Bonavista—Burin—Trinity	NL	Lib	Lib	13,972	46.6%	1,694	5.7%	52.1%	13,972	12,278	2,484	–	–	1,257	–	–	29,991
Coast of Bays—Central—Notre Dame	NL	Lib	Con	14,927	46.9%	281	0.9%	51.5%	14,646	14,927	2,261	–	–	–	–	–	31,834
Labrador	NL	Lib	Lib	4,119	42.7%	1,189	12.3%	48.3%	4,119	2,930	2,297	–	–	307	–	–	9,653
Long Range Mountains	NL	Lib	Lib	16,178	44.4 %	1,834	5.0%	53.3%	16,178	14,344	4,347	–	–	1,578	–	–	36,447
St. John's East	NL	NDP	Lib	17,239	45.2%	4,149	10.9%	57.6%	17,239	7,119	13,090	–	–	723	–	–	38,171
St. John's South—Mount Pearl	NL	Lib	Lib	19,478	56.2%	11,365	32.8%	53.0%	19,478	6,447	8,113	–	–	638	–	–	34,676
Cape Breton—Canso	NS	Lib	Lib	18,288	46.5%	4,483	11.4%	65.6%	18,288	13,805	5,618	–	–	1,649	–	–	39,360
Central Nova	NS	Lib	Lib	18,682	46.2%	5,622	13.9%	66.7%	18,682	13,060	6,225	–	494	1,445	365	203	40,474
Cumberland—Colchester	NS	Lib	Con	18,601	46.0%	4,779	11.8%	60.1%	13,822	18,601	4,984	–	1,045	1,687	278	–	40,417
Dartmouth—Cole Harbour	NS	Lib	Lib	24,209	53.1%	8,942	19.6%	61.2%	24,209	–	15,267	–	1,371	4,781	–	–	45,628
Halifax	NS	Lib	Lib	21,905	42.7%	1,558	3.0%	68.1%	21,905	6,601	20,347	–	1,128	1,069	–	198	51,248
Halifax West	NS	Lib	Lib	24,744	48.5%	12,413	24.3%	65.0%	24,744	11,243	12,331	–	1,181	1,447	–	85	51,031
Kings—Hants	NS	Lib	Lib	20,192	44.9%	6,958	15.5%	63.4%	20,192	13,234	8,645	–	940	1,945	–	–	44,956
Sackville—Preston—Chezzetcook	NS	Lib	Lib	18,838	41.3%	6,791	14.9%	63.5%	18,838	12,047	12,012	–	933	1,776	–	–	45,606
South Shore—St. Margarets	NS	Lib	Con	20,454	40.9%	1,879	3.8%	63.2%	18,575	20,454	9,541	–	1,434	–	–	–	50,004
Sydney—Victoria	NS	Lib	Lib	14,250	39.2%	1,084	2.9%	61.6%	14,250	13,166	7,217	–	376	1,176	–	127	36,312
West Nova	NS	Con	Con	22,104	50.4%	8,672	19.1%	62.6%	13,732	22,104	5,645	–	–	2,390	–	–	43,871
Ajax	ON	Lib	Lib	28,279	56.8%	15,042	30.2%	54.1%	28,279	13,237	6,988	–	1,254	–	–	–	49,758
Algoma—Manitoulin—Kapuskasing	ON	NDP	NDP	15,895	40.2%	5,010	12.7%	59.9%	8,888	10,885	15,895	–	726	2,840	–	289	39,523
Aurora—Oak Ridges—Richmond Hill	ON	Con	Lib	20,764	45.2%	1,460	3.1%	55.0%	20,764	19,304	3,594	–	–	1,734	–	500	45,896
Barrie—Innisfil	ON	Con	Con	25,234	47.7%	9,942	18.8%	59.1%	15,292	25,234	8,349	–	–	4,060	–	–	52,935
Barrie—Springwater—Oro-Medonte	ON	Con	Con	23,555	45.1%	7,410	14.2%	63.6%	16,145	23,555	8,910	–	–	3,629	–	–	52,239
Bay of Quinte	ON	Lib	Con	25,479	41.3%	2,937	4.8%	65.0%	22,542	25,479	9,284	–	1,350	3,045	–	–	61,700
Beaches—East York	ON	Lib	Lib	28,919	56.6%	17,406	34.1%	65.1%	28,919	7,336	11,513	–	1,388	1,613	166	181	51,116
Brampton Centre	ON	Lib	Lib	16,189	47.7%	5,163	15.2%	54.1%	16,189	11,026	5,932	–	–	–	824	–	33,971
Brampton East	ON	Lib	Lib	22,120	53.5%	10,473	25.3%	54.6%	22,120	11,647	6,511	–	–	1,073	–	–	41,351
Brampton North	ON	Lib	Lib	23,412	54.3%	10,123	23.5%	57.9%	23,412	13,289	6,448	–	–	–	–	–	43,149
Brampton South	ON	Lib	Lib	21,120	51.0%	8,524	20.6%	55.2%	21,120	12,596	5,894	–	–	1,820	–	–	41,430
Brampton West	ON	Lib	Lib	25,780	55.3%	12,594	27.0%	54.3%	25,780	13,186	6,097	–	–	1,218	328	–	46,609
Brantford—Brant	ON	Con	Con	26,675	40.3%	7,880	11.9%	59.9%	18,795	26,675	12,964	–	1,759	5,633	296	–	66,122
Bruce—Grey—Owen Sound	ON	Con	Con	28,727	49.2%	13,989	24.0%	64.3%	14,738	28,727	7,939	–	1,789	4,697	524	–	58,414
Burlington	ON	Lib	Lib	31,602	45.7%	5,860	8.4%	69.7%	31,602	25,742	7,507	–	1,368	2,764	–	122	69,105
Cambridge	ON	Lib	Lib	20,866	38.0%	1,990	3.6%	61.3%	20,866	18,876	9,319	–	1,860	3,931	–	–	54,852
Carleton	ON	Con	Con	35,356	49.9%	11,058	15.6%	74.6%	24,298	35,356	8,164	–	1,327	1,728	–	–	70,873
Chatham-Kent—Leamington	ON	Con	Con	22,435	40.9%	6,752	12.3%	63.8%	15,683	22,435	8,007	–	837	7,892	–	–	54,854
Davenport	ON	Lib	Lib	19,930	42.1%	76	0.1%	61.7%	19,930	4,774	19,854	–	1,087	1,499	163	–	47,307
Don Valley East	ON	Lib	Lib	22,356	59.9%	13,590	36.4%	59.1%	22,356	8,766	4,618	–	–	1,585	–	–	37,325
Don Valley North	ON	Lib	Lib	22,067	54.4%	9,969	24.6%	55.3%	22,067	12,098	4,304	–	765	1,301	–	–	40,535
Don Valley West	ON	Lib	Lib	24,798	52.7%	8,103	17.2%	66.3%	24,798	16,695	3,814	–	761	881	–	65	47,014
Dufferin—Caledon	ON	Con	Con	31,490	48.0%	11,623	17.7%	60.8%	19,867	31,490	6,866	–	2,754	4,389	207	–	65,573
Durham	ON	Con	Con	31,423	46.4%	11,156	16.5%	61.3%	20,267	31,423	11,865	–	–	3,725	300	150	67,730
Eglinton—Lawrence	ON	Lib	Lib	24,051	48.5%	5,969	12.1%	61.8%	24,051	18,082	4,543	–	1,490	1,445	–	–	49,611
Elgin—Middlesex—London	ON	Con	Con	31,472	49.9%	19,146	30.4%	65.3%	12,326	31,472	10,086	–	1,417	7,429	–	328	63,058
Essex	ON	Con	Con	28,741	41.1%	6,463	9.3%	66.9%	10,813	28,741	22,278	–	865	6,925	172	182	69,976
Etobicoke Centre	ON	Lib	Lib	27,635	48.0%	7,527	13.1%	64.1%	27,635	20,108	5,804	–	–	4,003	–	–	57,550
Etobicoke North	ON	Lib	Lib	21,201	59.6%	12,335	34.7%	50.2%	21,201	8,866	3,708	–	–	1,473	316	–	35,564
Etobicoke—Lakeshore	ON	Lib	Lib	30,355	47.4%	9,898	15.5%	63.1%	30,355	20,457	8,775	–	1,363	2,857	–	258	64,065
Flamborough—Glanbrook	ON	Con	Con	24,370	40.6%	3,020	5.1%	65.6%	21,350	24,370	9,409	–	1,254	3,686	–	–	60,069
Glengarry—Prescott—Russell	ON	Lib	Lib	30,362	46.1%	8,383	12.8%	70.1%	30,362	21,979	7,022	–	1,350	4,458	314	422	65,907
Guelph	ON	Lib	Lib	29,382	42.1%	12,587	18.0%	66.3%	29,382	16,795	14,713	–	5,250	3,182	–	449	69,771
Haldimand—Norfolk	ON	Con	Con	29,664	47.4%	12,440	19.9%	67.2%	17,224	29,664	8,320	–	–	6,570	–	814	62,592
Haliburton—Kawartha Lakes—Brock	ON	Con	Con	35,418	52.3%	19,773	29.2%	66.5%	15,645	35,418	9,730	–	1,696	4,769	–	463	67,721
Hamilton Centre	ON	NDP	NDP	20,105	48.7%	9,164	22.2%	56.4%	10,941	6,209	20,105	–	1,105	2,637	99	184	41,280
Hamilton East—Stoney Creek	ON	Lib	Lib	18,358	36.9%	4,424	8.9%	59.3%	18,358	13,934	12,748	–	1,020	3,733	–	–	49,793
Hamilton Mountain	ON	NDP	Lib	16,548	34.1%	842	1.7%	60.6%	16,548	11,828	15,706	–	974	3,098	–	306	48,460
Hamilton West—Ancaster—Dundas	ON	Lib	Lib	27,845	44.3%	9,683	15.4%	71.2%	27,845	18,162	12,432	–	1,661	2,584	–	137	62,821
Hastings—Lennox and Addington	ON	Con	Con	24,651	45.1%	5,595	10.2%	66.1%	19,056	24,651	6,020	–	971	3,131	838	–	54,667
Humber River—Black Creek	ON	Lib	Lib	19,533	60.7%	13,934	43.3%	49.6%	19,533	5,599	5,279	–	388	1,258	–	130	32,187
Huron—Bruce	ON	Con	Con	31,170	50.9%	15,155	24.7%	70.0%	16,015	31,170	9,056	–	–	4,437	519	–	61,197
Kanata—Carleton	ON	Lib	Lib	26,394	41.8%	2,021	3.2%	73.5%	26,394	24,373	8,822	–	1,709	1,858	–	–	63,156
Kenora	ON	Con	Con	11,103	42.6%	3,302	12.7%	57.6%	5,190	11,103	7,801	–	364	1,625	–	–	26,083
Kingston and the Islands	ON	Lib	Lib	27,724	41.1%	7,949	11.8%	69.2%	27,724	16,019	19,775	–	1,673	2,314	–	–	67,505
King—Vaughan	ON	Lib	Con	22,534	45.1%	1,076	2.2%	49.0%	21,458	22,534	3,234	–	620	2,149	–	–	49,995
Kitchener Centre	ON	Lib	Grn	17,872	34.9%	5,335	10.4%	62.9%	8,297	12,537	8,938	–	17,872	3,381	–	154	51,179
Kitchener South—Hespeler	ON	Lib	Lib	18,596	37.5%	947	2.0%	62.0%	18,596	17,649	8,079	–	1,710	3,351	119	150	49,654
Kitchener—Conestoga	ON	Lib	Lib	20,025	39.3%	577	1.1%	68.3%	20,025	19,448	5,948	–	1,842	3,690	–	–	50,953
Lambton—Kent—Middlesex	ON	Con	Con	29,431	48.5%	16,879	27.8%	67.0%	12,552	29,431	11,107	–	1,035	6,567	–	–	60,692
Lanark—Frontenac—Kingston	ON	Con	Con	30,761	48.9%	14,144	22.5%	70.1%	16,617	30,761	9,828	–	1,664	3,830	–	211	62,911
Leeds—Grenville—Thousand Islands and Rideau Lakes	ON	Con	Con	29,950	50.5%	15,015	25.3%	68.5%	14,935	29,950	8,863	–	2,134	3,394	–	–	59,276
London North Centre	ON	Lib	Lib	22,921	39.1%	7,032	12.0%	62.2%	22,921	15,889	15,611	–	1,297	2,902	–	–	58,620
London West	ON	Lib	Lib	25,308	36.9%	3,035	4.4%	68.5%	25,308	22,273	16,858	–	–	3,409	–	773	68,621
London—Fanshawe	ON	NDP	NDP	22,336	43.4%	9,850	19.1%	56.6%	11,882	12,486	22,336	–	–	4,718	–	–	51,422
Markham—Stouffville	ON	Lib	Lib	29,773	51.0%	9,033	12.5%	60.8%	29,773	20,740	4,961	–	1,049	1,869	–	–	58,392
Markham—Thornhill	ON	Lib	Lib	23,709	61.5%	13,573	35.2%	55.7%	23,709	10,136	3,222	–	813	648	–	–	38,528
Markham—Unionville	ON	Con	Lib	21,958	48.6%	2,989	6.7%	52.0%	21,958	18,959	3,001	–	1,306	–	–	–	45,224
Milton	ON	Lib	Lib	28,503	51.5%	10,190	18.4%	62.6%	28,503	18,313	4,925	–	1,280	2,365	–	–	55,386
Mississauga Centre	ON	Lib	Lib	25,719	54.2%	12,329	26.0%	56.3%	25,719	13,390	5,331	–	863	2,128	–	–	47,431
Mississauga East—Cooksville	ON	Lib	Lib	22,806	50.0%	8,084	17.7%	55.6%	22,806	14,722	4,678	–	–	2,933	329	107	45,575
Mississauga—Erin Mills	ON	Lib	Lib	25,866	51.0%	8,778	17.3%	58.6%	25,866	17,088	5,178	–	829	1,711	–	–	50,672
Mississauga—Lakeshore	ON	Lib	Lib	25,284	44.9%	3,523	6.2%	63.8%	25,284	21,761	5,488	–	1,265	2,367	–	94	56,259
Mississauga—Malton	ON	Lib	Lib	21,766	52.8%	9,141	22.2%	54.1%	21,766	12,625	5,771	–	811	–	–	275	41,248
Mississauga—Streetsville	ON	Lib	Lib	23,698	47.3%	6,567	13.1%	58.7%	23,698	17,131	6,186	–	1,048	1,851	–	210	50,124
Nepean	ON	Lib	Lib	29,620	45.1%	7,436	11.4%	70.8%	29,620	22,184	10,786	–	1,318	1,840	–	–	65,748
Newmarket—Aurora	ON	Lib	Lib	24,208	43.8%	3,035	5.5%	60.6%	24,208	21,173	6,338	–	1,015	2,296	260	–	55,290
Niagara Centre	ON	Lib	Lib	20,576	35.0%	2,252	3.8%	63.5%	20,576	18,324	14,086	–	1,123	4,670	–	–	58,779
Niagara Falls	ON	Con	Con	26,810	37.9%	3,160	4.4%	62.2%	23,650	26,810	12,871	–	1,370	5,948	–	–	70,649
Niagara West	ON	Con	Con	25,206	45.6%	8,391	15.2%	71.6%	16,815	25,206	7,064	–	1,602	3,933	–	657	55,277
Nickel Belt	ON	Lib	Lib	17,353	35.2%	3,928	8.0%	63.8%	17,353	13,425	13,137	–	848	4,558	–	–	49,321
Nipissing—Timiskaming	ON	Lib	Lib	18,405	38.8%	3,301	7.0%	63.2%	18,405	15,104	10,493	–	–	3,494	–	–	47,496
Northumberland—Peterborough South	ON	Con	Con	31,015	44.5%	7,679	11.0%	70.0%	23,336	31,015	9,809	–	1,764	3,813	–	–	69,737
Oakville	ON	Lib	Lib	28,137	46.1%	3,707	6.1%	68.3%	28,137	24,430	5,373	–	1,090	1,970	–	–	61,000
Oakville North—Burlington	ON	Lib	Lib	30,910	46.8%	5,819	8.8%	66.9%	30,910	25,091	6,574	–	1,019	2,429	–	–	66,023
Orléans	ON	Lib	Lib	39,101	51.9%	17,401	23.1%	71.2%	39,101	21,700	10,983	–	1,233	2,046	–	220	75,283
Oshawa	ON	Con	Con	22,409	39.7%	6,330	11.2%	56.4%	13,044	22,409	16,079	–	864	4,029	–	–	56,425
Ottawa Centre	ON	Lib	Lib	33,825	45.5%	9,273	12.5%	77.2%	33,825	11,650	24,552	–	2,115	1,605	132	462	74,341
Ottawa South	ON	Lib	Lib	29,038	48.8%	13,541	22.8%	66.7%	29,038	15,497	11,514	–	1,401	1,898	–	144	59,492
Ottawa West—Nepean	ON	Lib	Lib	25,889	45.1%	9,416	16.4%	68.5%	25,889	16,473	11,163	–	1,642	1,908	–	327	57,402
Ottawa—Vanier	ON	Lib	Lib	28,462	49.0%	14,759	25.4%	65.8%	28,462	11,611	13,703	–	1,816	1,855	157	427	58,031
Oxford	ON	Con	Con	29,146	47.0%	16,426	26.5%	65.2%	12,720	29,146	11,325	–	1,683	6,595	–	479	61,948
Parkdale—High Park	ON	Lib	Lib	22,307	42.5%	1,705	3.3%	65.8%	22,307	6,815	20,602	–	957	1,642	–	220	52,543
Parry Sound-Muskoka	ON	Con	Con	26,600	47.9%	14,586	26.3%	65.0%	12,014	26,600	9,339	–	3,099	4,184	169	95	55,500
Perth Wellington	ON	Con	Con	26,984	48.6%	13,300	24.0%	65.8%	13,684	26,984	9,552	–	–	5,357	–	–	55,577
Peterborough—Kawartha	ON	Lib	Con	27,402	39.0%	2,738	3.9%	70.1%	24,664	27,402	13,302	–	1,553	3,073	218	–	70,212
Pickering—Uxbridge	ON	Lib	Lib	27,271	46.9%	6,295	10.8%	62.2%	27,271	20,976	7,592	–	–	2,328	–	–	58,167
Renfrew—Nipissing—Pembroke	ON	Con	Con	28,967	49.5%	16,704	28.5%	66.8%	11,335	28,967	12,263	–	1,111	4,469	373	–	58,518
Richmond Hill	ON	Lib	Lib	21,784	47.7%	4,069	8.9%	55.6%	21,784	17,715	3,995	–	–	1,363	805	–	45,662
Sarnia—Lambton	ON	Con	Con	26,292	46.2%	14,302	25.1%	67.2%	10,975	26,292	11,990	–	848	6,359	–	435	56,899
Sault Ste. Marie	ON	Lib	Lib	15,231	37.9%	247	0.6%	61.2%	15,231	14,984	8,041	–	–	1,923	–	–	40,179
Scarborough Centre	ON	Lib	Lib	23,128	57.6%	13,309	33.2%	54.8%	23,128	9,819	5,479	–	–	1,472	–	263	40,161
Scarborough North	ON	Lib	Lib	21,178	66.6%	15,179	47.7%	50.6%	21,178	5,999	3,514	–	–	763	–	361	31,815
Scarborough Southwest	ON	Lib	Lib	24,823	57.5%	15,842	36.7%	56.8%	24,823	8,981	6,924	–	1,068	1,259	117	–	43,172
Scarborough—Agincourt	ON	Lib	Lib	20,712	56.5%	10,182	27.5%	53.2%	20,712	10,630	3,679	–	631	978	–	–	36,630
Scarborough-Guildwood	ON	Lib	Lib	22,944	61.1%	14,946	39.8%	58.0%	22,944	7,998	5,091	–	–	1,096	240	181	37,550
Scarborough—Rouge Park	ON	Lib	Lib	28,702	62.8%	19,074	41.7%	61.3%	28,702	9,628	6,068	–	–	1,322	–	–	45,720
Simcoe North	ON	Con	Con	27,383	43.0%	8,051	12.6%	63.2%	19,332	27,383	9,958	–	1,903	4,822	–	210	63,608
Simcoe—Grey	ON	Con	Con	36,249	47.3%	14,929	19.5%	63.6%	21,320	36,249	10,140	–	2,969	5,550	–	382	76,610
Spadina—Fort York	ON	Lib	Lib	18,991	38.9%	2,157	4.4%	54.6%	18,991	9,875	16,834	–	1,645	1,476	–	–	48,821
St. Catharines	ON	Lib	Lib	22,069	37.8%	3,051	5.2%	64.9%	22,069	19,018	12,294	–	1,091	3,860	–	–	58,332
Stormont—Dundas—South Glengarry	ON	Con	Con	29,255	55.6%	16,812	32.0%	62.1%	12,443	29,255	5,804	–	1,230	3,921	–	–	52,653
Sudbury	ON	Lib	Lib	15,871	34.5%	2,302	5.0%	62.3%	15,871	12,747	13,569	–	940	2,735	111	–	45,973
Thornhill	ON	Con	Con	25,687	51.3%	7,519	15.0%	58.8%	18,168	25,687	3,041	–	844	2,322	–	–	50,062
Thunder Bay—Rainy River	ON	Lib	Lib	13,655	34.3%	1,984	5.0%	61.7%	13,655	11,671	11,342	–	571	2,621	–	–	39,860
Thunder Bay—Superior North	ON	Lib	Lib	16,893	40.7%	5,649	13.6%	63.6%	16,893	10,035	11,244	–	735	2,465	–	111	41,483
Timmins-James Bay	ON	NDP	NDP	12,132	35.1%	2,739	7.9%	55.4%	8,508	9,393	12,132	–	–	4,537	–	–	34,570
Toronto Centre	ON	Lib	Lib	23,071	50.4%	11,162	24.4%	57.4%	23,071	5,571	11,909	–	3,921	1,047	–	298	45,817
Toronto—Danforth	ON	Lib	Lib	25,214	48.4%	7,659	14.7%	65.8%	25,214	6,547	17,555	–	1,023	1,282	123	398	52,142
Toronto—St. Paul's	ON	Lib	Lib	26,429	49.2%	12,842	23.9%	65.6%	26,429	13,587	9,036	–	3,214	1,432	–	–	53,698
University—Rosedale	ON	Lib	Lib	22,451	47.5%	10,530	22.3%	61.3%	22,451	9,473	11,921	–	1,974	1,172	–	244	47,235
Vaughan—Woodbridge	ON	Lib	Lib	21,699	46.0%	2,680	5.7%	58.9%	21,699	19,019	3,265	–	453	2,567	159	–	47,162
Waterloo	ON	Lib	Lib	26,926	45.1%	10,398	17.4%	69.4%	26,926	16,528	11,360	–	2,038	2,802	–	–	59,654
Wellington—Halton Hills	ON	Con	Con	35,257	52.1%	16,873	24.9%	67.3%	18,384	35,257	7,050	–	2,606	4,359	–	–	67,656
Whitby	ON	Lib	Lib	27,375	44.1%	5,104	8.2%	61.5%	27,375	22,271	8,766	–	972	2,682	–	–	62,066
Willowdale	ON	Lib	Lib	21,043	51.2%	7,127	17.3%	54.8%	21,043	13,916	4,231	–	812	1,102	–	–	41,104
Windsor West	ON	NDP	NDP	21,541	44.2%	8,017	16.4%	53.4%	13,524	9,415	21,541	–	–	4,060	–	153	48,693
Windsor—Tecumseh	ON	Lib	Lib	18,134	31.8%	669	1.1%	60.9%	18,134	14,605	17,465	–	682	5,927	–	164	56,977
York Centre	ON	Lib	Lib	17,430	47.3%	3,481	9.5%	53.4%	17,430	13,949	3,753	–	–	1,726	–	–	36,858
York South—Weston	ON	Lib	Lib	21,644	56.1%	13,861	35.9%	51.1%	21,644	7,783	6,517	–	872	1,754	–	–	38,570
York—Simcoe	ON	Con	Con	24,900	50.0%	10,431	21.0%	53.7%	14,469	24,900	6,800	–	–	3,662	–	–	49,831
Cardigan	PE	Lib	Lib	11,175	50.6%	4,358	19.7%	72.7%	11,175	6,817	2,168	–	1,064	725	–	145	22,094
Charlottetown	PE	Lib	Lib	8,919	46.7%	2,987	15.6%	71.1%	8,919	5,932	2,048	–	1,832	369	–	–	19,100
Egmont	PE	Lib	Lib	9,040	46.2%	2,952	15.1%	69.3%	9,040	6,088	1,688	–	1,771	974	–	–	19,561
Malpeque	PE	Lib	Lib	9,912	41.8%	2,076	8.7%	75.4%	9,912	7,836	1,898	–	3,381	680	–	–	23,707
Abitibi—Baie-James—Nunavik—Eeyou	QC	BQ	BQ	10,784	37.9%	3,400	11.9%	44.9%	7,384	4,508	3,323	10,784	442	1,072	–	923	28,436
Abitibi—Témiscamingue	QC	BQ	BQ	23,120	50.6%	12,017	26.5%	56.5%	11,013	5,339	2,794	23,120	748	1,538	–	1,133	45,685
Ahuntsic-Cartierville	QC	Lib	Lib	26,402	52.4%	15,290	30.4%	64.2%	26,402	4,247	5,844	11,112	1,491	1,313	–	–	50,409
Alfred-Pellan	QC	Lib	Lib	24,516	47.8%	11,117	21.7%	66.6%	24,516	6,988	3,946	13,399	940	–	–	1,467	51,256
Argenteuil—La Petite-Nation	QC	Lib	Lib	19,371	38.3%	1,529	3.0%	61.2%	19,371	6,547	3,390	17,842	–	2,777	–	686	50,613
Avignon—La Mitis—Matane—Matapédia	QC	BQ	BQ	19,776	59.8%	12,681	38.3%	56.6%	7,095	2,912	1,501	19,776	–	965	–	826	33,075
Beauce	QC	Con	Con	27,514	48.3%	17,152	30.1%	66.7%	7,018	27,514	1,654	8,644	486	10,362	–	1,302	56,980
Beauport—Côte-de-Beaupré—Île d'Orléans—Charlevoix	QC	BQ	BQ	19,270	38.4%	3,301	6.5%	65.6%	10,365	15,969	2,242	19,270	733	881	227	449	50,136
Beauport—Limoilou	QC	BQ	BQ	15,146	31.1%	982	2.0%	65.0%	12,378	14,164	5,075	15,146	1,025	–	–	856	48,644
Bécancour—Nicolet—Saurel	QC	BQ	BQ	27,403	54.8%	18,952	37.9%	63.5%	8,451	8,404	2,550	27,403	770	1,214	–	1,215	50,007
Bellechasse—Les Etchemins—Lévis	QC	Con	Con	32,238	51.0%	17,569	27.8%	66.8%	10,074	32,238	3,184	14,669	918	–	306	1,793	63,182
Beloeil—Chambly	QC	BQ	BQ	34,678	53.1%	19,176	29.4%	68.7%	15,502	5,661	5,524	34,678	1,294	1,316	–	1,349	65,324
Berthier—Maskinongé	QC	BQ	BQ	19,339	35.2%	937	2.2%	65.0%	8,403	6,007	18,402	19,339	548	1,496	–	750	54,945
Bourassa	QC	Lib	Lib	22,303	60.4%	15,396	41.7%	56.6%	22,303	2,587	2,956	6,907	679	1,349	151	–	36,932
Brome—Missisquoi	QC	Lib	Lib	21,488	35.0%	197	0.4%	66.3%	21,488	9,961	3,828	21,291	1,466	1,982	145	1,310	61,471
Brossard—Saint-Lambert	QC	Lib	Lib	28,326	54.1%	17,885	34.2%	63.8%	28,326	6,276	5,442	10,441	–	1,288	–	583	52,356
Charlesbourg—Haute-Saint-Charles	QC	Con	Con	25,623	44.7%	11,386	19.9%	68.7%	11,326	25,623	3,446	14,237	972	1,296	–	449	57,349
Châteauguay—Lacolle	QC	Lib	Lib	18,029	37.0%	12	–	62.3%	18,029	5,538	3,752	18,017	801	1,821	–	725	48,683
Chicoutimi—Le Fjord	QC	Con	Con	17,228	41.0%	3,201	7.6%	65.4%	7,676	17,228	1,944	14,027	482	649	–	–	42,006
Compton—Stanstead	QC	Lib	Lib	21,188	36.7%	3,507	6.1%	67.6%	21,188	10,087	4,288	17,681	1,623	2,167	186	576	57,796
Dorval—Lachine—LaSalle	QC	Lib	Lib	25,233	52.4%	17,691	36.7%	59.2%	25,233	5,754	6,241	7,542	1,351	2,020	–	–	48,141
Drummond	QC	BQ	BQ	23,866	46.6%	14,252	27.8%	61.3%	9,614	9,179	5,709	23,866	–	–	419	2,402	51,189
Gaspésie—Les Îles-de-la-Madeleine	QC	Lib	Lib	17,099	46.4%	2,618	7.1%	57.5%	17,099	3,010	1,358	14,481	–	621	–	289	36,858
Gatineau	QC	Lib	Lib	26,267	50.0%	13,989	26.6%	63.8%	26,267	5,752	4,508	12,278	783	2,264	–	645	52,497
Hochelaga	QC	Lib	Lib	18,197	38.1%	3,108	6.5%	61.6%	18,197	2,221	9,723	15,089	965	1,081	–	430	47,706
Honoré-Mercier	QC	Lib	Lib	29,033	60.0%	21,125	43.7%	64.1%	29,033	5,086	3,537	7,908	734	2,023	–	88	48,409
Hull—Aylmer	QC	Lib	Lib	26,892	52.5%	18,569	36.3%	66.5%	26,892	5,507	6,483	8,323	1,459	1,864	143	578	51,249
Joliette	QC	BQ	BQ	30,913	55.0%	18,182	32.3%	62.3%	12,731	5,314	3,100	30,913	1,126	1,771	–	1,243	56,198
Jonquière	QC	BQ	BQ	19,036	41.9%	5,813	12.8%	63.2%	9,546	13,223	2,559	19,036	738	–	–	372	45,474
La Pointe-de-l'Île	QC	BQ	BQ	23,835	46.7%	7,327	14.4%	62.3%	16,508	3,427	4,954	23,835	–	1,399	–	957	51,080
La Prairie	QC	BQ	BQ	25,862	43.7%	5,392	9.1%	67.8%	20,470	5,878	4,317	25,862	983	1,532	–	98	59,140
Lac-Saint-Jean	QC	BQ	BQ	25,466	50.7%	12,567	25.0%	60.7%	9,371	12,899	1,637	25,466	824	–	–	–	50,197
Lac-Saint-Louis	QC	Lib	Lib	32,477	56.3%	21,566	37.4%	69.7%	32,477	10,911	7,679	3,078	1,868	1,712	–	–	57,725
LaSalle—Émard—Verdun	QC	Lib	Lib	20,330	42.9%	9,869	20.8%	60.8%	20,330	3,530	9,168	10,461	1,439	1,600	–	832	47,360
Laurentides—Labelle	QC	BQ	BQ	32,133	50.1%	16,167	25.2%	62.1%	15,966	6,770	3,907	32,133	1,570	2,432	180	1,165	64,123
Laurier—Sainte-Marie	QC	Lib	Lib	16,961	38.0%	2,281	5.1%	56.8%	16,961	1,500	14,680	9,114	992	758	74	597	44,676
Laval—Les Îles	QC	Lib	Lib	24,758	48.9%	15,102	29.8%	61.9%	24,758	8,963	3,889	9,656	760	2,571	–	–	50,597
Lévis—Lotbinière	QC	Con	Con	32,731	51.6%	18,991	29.9%	70.3%	9,286	32,731	4,497	13,740	856	1,661	–	636	63,407
Longueuil—Charles-LeMoyne	QC	Lib	Lib	19,400	40.4%	2,474	5.1%	59.9%	19,400	3,986	4,957	16,926	1,170	1,409	–	122	47,970
Longueuil—Saint-Hubert	QC	BQ	BQ	23,579	41.2%	1,649	2.9%	67.6%	21,930	3,964	4,553	23,579	1,599	1,358	–	252	57,235
Louis-Hébert	QC	Lib	Lib	22,933	38.3%	6,686	11.1%	74.3%	22,933	14,332	4,337	16,247	1,573	–	378	–	59,800
Louis-Saint-Laurent	QC	Con	Con	33,098	51.6%	20,029	31.2%	67.8%	11,228	33,098	3,370	13,069	907	1,337	–	1,089	64,098
Manicouagan	QC	BQ	BQ	18,419	52.6%	10,779	30.8%	50.2%	6,545	7,640	1,509	18,419	–	–	–	887	35,000
Marc-Aurèle-Fortin	QC	Lib	Lib	22,992	44.1%	6,937	13.3%	67.3%	22,992	6,120	4,461	16,055	–	1,509	–	990	52,127
Mégantic—L'Érable	QC	Con	Con	26,121	56.3%	16,803	36.2%	65.5%	6,329	26,121	1,308	9,318	592	1,677	403	680	46,428
Mirabel	QC	BQ	BQ	29,376	46.5%	14,534	23.0%	63.7%	14,842	8,510	5,221	29,376	1,412	2,569	–	1,182	63,112
Montarville	QC	BQ	BQ	26,011	45.3%	6,037	10.5%	74.7%	19,974	5,460	4,809	26,011	–	1,218	–	–	57,472
Montcalm	QC	BQ	BQ	27,378	53.2%	17,182	33.4%	57.0%	10,196	6,011	3,218	27,378	1,317	2,258	–	1,074	51,452
Montmagny—L'Islet—Kamouraska—Rivière-du-Loup	QC	Con	Con	24,118	50.4%	11,568	24.2%	62.1%	8,361	24,118	1,597	12,550	–	–	–	1,186	47,812
Mount Royal	QC	Lib	Lib	23,284	57.7%	13,395	33.2%	57.3%	23,284	9,889	3,381	1,585	1,083	1,051	–	89	40,362
Notre-Dame-de-Grâce—Westmount	QC	Lib	Lib	24,510	53.8%	15,757	34.6%	62.7%	24,510	6,412	8,753	2,407	1,835	1,498	–	176	45,591
Outremont	QC	Lib	Lib	16,714	45.4%	7,135	19.4%	57.2%	16,714	2,882	9,579	5,535	1,198	819	93	–	36,820
Papineau	QC	Lib	Lib	22,848	50.3%	12,545	27.6%	63.5%	22,848	2,198	10,303	6,830	1,448	1,064	199	533	45,423
Pierre-Boucher—Les Patriotes—Verchères	QC	BQ	BQ	29,978	54.3%	15,696	28.4%	68.9%	14,282	4,870	4,261	29,978	–	1,078	–	777	55,246
Pierrefonds—Dollard	QC	Lib	Lib	29,296	56.0%	18,403	35.2%	64.7%	29,296	10,893	6,034	4,141	–	1,942	–	–	52,306
Pontiac	QC	Lib	Lib	26,899	43.4%	14,095	22.8%	65.6%	26,899	12,804	6,824	10,424	1,711	2,813	–	532	62,007
Portneuf—Jacques-Cartier	QC	Con	Con	33,657	51.6%	18,132	27.8%	69.0%	10,068	33,657	3,223	15,525	–	1,615	–	1,128	65,216
Québec	QC	Lib	Lib	18,132	35.4%	3,308	6.4%	67.6%	18,132	9,239	6,652	14,824	1,182	855	–	307	51,191
Repentigny	QC	BQ	BQ	30,848	51.7%	14,348	24.1%	66.0%	16,500	5,328	4,484	30,848	–	–	–	2,541	59,701
Richmond—Arthabaska	QC	Con	Con	28,513	49.9%	14,363	25.1%	66.3%	8,543	28,513	2,550	14,150	–	2,058	–	1,345	57,159
Rimouski-Neigette—Témiscouata—Les Basques	QC	BQ	BQ	20,657	49.0%	10,175	24.1%	61.0%	10,482	5,569	2,641	20,657	–	700	1,467	622	42,138
Rivière-des-Mille-Îles	QC	BQ	BQ	21,645	40.6%	2,810	5.3%	65.4%	18,835	5,479	3,852	21,645	972	1,468	–	1,115	53,366
Rivière-du-Nord	QC	BQ	BQ	29,943	52.2%	17,176	29.9%	59.1%	12,767	6,803	3,958	29,943	–	2,164	–	1,694	57,329
Rosemont—La Petite-Patrie	QC	NDP	NDP	26,708	48.6%	13,970	25.4%	67.9%	12,738	2,199	26,708	11,751	1,308	–	–	284	54,988
Saint-Hyacinthe—Bagot	QC	BQ	BQ	25,165	47.5%	13,135	24.8%	65.6%	12,030	7,166	6,170	25,165	–	1,445	–	1,055	53,031
Saint-Jean	QC	BQ	BQ	27,243	46.0%	10,593	17.9%	66.1%	16,650	7,544	4,308	27,243	1,262	–	–	2,203	59,210
Saint-Laurent	QC	Lib	Lib	22,056	59.1%	15,154	40.6%	57.4%	22,056	6,902	4,059	2,972	–	1,182	–	146	37,317
Saint-Léonard—Saint-Michel	QC	Lib	Lib	29,010	69.4%	24,629	58.9%	57.5%	29,010	4,381	3,460	3,395	–	1,568	–	–	41,814
Saint-Maurice—Champlain	QC	Lib	Lib	23,913	42.4%	6,973	12.3%	61.6%	23,913	10,139	2,849	16,940	731	–	241	1,524	56,337
Salaberry—Suroît	QC	BQ	BQ	29,093	47.8%	12,543	20.6%	62.7%	16,550	7,476	4,529	29,093	–	2,207	–	1,010	60,865
Shefford	QC	BQ	BQ	24,997	41.9%	5,029	8.4%	65.2%	19,968	7,234	3,173	24,997	1,059	2,073	–	1,122	59,626
Sherbrooke	QC	Lib	Lib	21,830	37.5%	4,982	8.5%	65.6%	21,830	7,490	8,107	16,848	1,670	1,453	–	787	58,185
Terrebonne	QC	BQ	BQ	24,270	41.2%	6,795	11.6%	66.4%	17,475	6,183	3,913	24,270	847	1,594	3,864	803	58,949
Thérèse-De Blainville	QC	BQ	BQ	21,526	41.2%	3,130	6.0%	63.7%	18,396	5,773	3,827	21,526	1,018	1,386	–	362	52,288
Trois-Rivières	QC	BQ	BQ	17,136	29.5%	83	0.2%	64.2%	16,637	17,053	4,680	17,136	754	1,115	–	735	58,110
Vaudreuil—Soulanges	QC	Lib	Lib	30,001	46.5%	15,693	24.3%	66.9%	30,001	10,556	6,780	14,308	1,631	–	–	1,288	64,564
Ville-Marie–Le Sud-Ouest–Île-des-Sœurs	QC	Lib	Lib	24,978	50.5%	15,737	31.8%	57.0%	24,978	6,138	9,241	6,176	1,343	1,291	–	256	49,423
Vimy	QC	Lib	Lib	25,316	49.8%	13,505	26.6%	58.9%	25,316	6,829	4,731	11,811	–	2,175	–	–	50,862
Battlefords—Lloydminster	SK	Con	Con	21,336	68.7%	17,618	56.7%	61.7%	1,748	21,336	3,718	–	237	1,847	–	2,162	31,048
Carlton Trail—Eagle Creek	SK	Con	Con	28,192	68.6%	22,584	55.0%	70.3%	2,066	28,192	5,608	–	379	3,791	–	1,053	41,089
Cypress Hills—Grasslands	SK	Con	Con	24,518	71.5%	20,914	61.0%	69.4%	1,492	24,518	3,604	–	284	2,826	193	1,360	34,277
Desnethé—Missinippi—Churchill River	SK	Con	Con	10,036	48.8%	4,503	21.9%	44.8%	5,533	10,036	3,548	–	215	1,002	240	–	20,574
Moose Jaw—Lake Centre—Lanigan	SK	Con	Con	24,869	60.4%	16,894	41.0%	69.7%	2,526	24,869	7,975	–	438	4,712	–	664	41,184
Prince Albert	SK	Con	Con	22,340	64.9%	17,126	49.8%	60.2%	3,653	22,340	5,214	–	364	2,388	–	466	34,425
Regina—Lewvan	SK	Con	Con	21,375	46.8%	5,612	12.3%	67.2%	6,310	21,375	15,763	–	560	1,635	–	–	45,643
Regina—Qu'Appelle	SK	Con	Con	20,400	61.9%	13,521	41.0%	60.0%	3,344	20,400	6,879	–	668	1,668	–	–	32,959
Regina—Wascana	SK	Con	Con	19,261	49.9%	8,871	23.0%	63.9%	10,390	19,261	6,975	–	622	1,352	–	–	38,600
Saskatoon West	SK	Con	Con	15,379	45.4%	2,051	6.1%	55.9%	2,778	15,379	13,328	–	357	2,064	–	–	33,906
Saskatoon—Grasswood	SK	Con	Con	22,760	49.9%	9,040	19.8%	68.7%	6,460	22,760	13,720	–	556	2,108	–	–	45,604
Saskatoon—University	SK	Con	Con	20,389	48.0%	5,347	12.6%	69.2%	4,608	20,389	15,042	–	405	1,778	–	295	42,517
Souris—Moose Mountain	SK	Con	Con	30,049	76.4%	26,478	67.3%	77.0%	1,636	30,049	3,107	–	–	3,571	–	977	39,340
Yorkton—Melville	SK	Con	Con	23,794	68.7%	19,555	56.5%	66.5%	2,187	23,794	4,239	–	614	3,227	–	597	34,658
Northwest Territories	Terr	Lib	Lib	5,387	38.2%	829	5.9%	47.2%	5,387	2,031	4,558	–	328	–	1,791	–	14,095
Nunavut	Terr	NDP	NDP	3,427	47.7%	849	11.8%	34.1%	2,578	1,184	3,427	–	–	–	–	–	7,189
Yukon	Terr	Lib	Lib	6,471	33.3%	1,375	7.0%	64.7%	6,471	5,096	4,354	–	846	–	2,639	–	19,406

= application for judicial recount
= judicial recount terminated
= results as certified by a judge

== Post-election pendulum ==
The robustness of the margins of victory for each party can be summarized in electoral pendulums. These are not necessarily a measure of the volatility of the respective riding results. The following tables show the margins over the various 2nd-place contenders, for which one-half of the value represents the swing needed to overturn the result. Actual seat turnovers in the 2021 election are noted for reference.

= seats that changed hands in the election

Post-election pendulum - 2021 Canadian federal election

Liberal (160 seats)
Margins 5% or less
Châteauguay—Lacolle	QC	BQ	–
Davenport	ON	NDP	0.1
Brome—Missisquoi	QC	BQ	0.4
Sault Ste. Marie	ON	Con	0.6
Vancouver Granville	BC	NDP	0.9
Fredericton	NB	Con	1.1
Kitchener—Conestoga	ON	Con	1.1
Windsor—Tecumseh	ON	NDP	1.1
Edmonton Centre	AB	Con	1.3
Hamilton Mountain	ON	NDP	1.7
Kitchener South—Hespeler	ON	Con	2.0
Richmond Centre	BC	Con	2.2
Sydney—Victoria	NS	Con	2.9
Halifax	NS	NDP	3.0
Argenteuil—La Petite-Nation	QC	BQ	3.0
Cloverdale—Langley City	BC	Con	3.1
Aurora—Oak Ridges—Richmond Hill	ON	Con	3.1
Kanata—Carleton	ON	Con	3.2
Parkdale—High Park	ON	NDP	3.3
Cambridge	ON	Con	3.6
Niagara Centre	ON	Con	3.8
West Vancouver—Sunshine Coast—Sea to Sky Country	BC	Con	3.9
London West	ON	Con	4.4
Spadina—Fort York	ON	NDP	4.4
Long Range Mountains	NL	Con	5.0
Sudbury	ON	NDP	5.0
Thunder Bay—Rainy River	ON	Con	5.0
Margins 5%–10%
Laurier—Sainte-Marie	QC	NDP	5.1
Longueuil—Charles-LeMoyne	QC	BQ	5.1
St. Catharines	ON	Con	5.2
Newmarket—Aurora	ON	Con	5.5
Bonavista—Burin—Trinity	NL	Con	5.7
Vaughan—Woodbridge	ON	Con	5.7
Northwest Territories	Terr	NDP	5.9
Oakville	ON	Con	6.1
Compton—Stanstead	QC	BQ	6.1
Mississauga—Lakeshore	ON	Con	6.2
Calgary Skyview	AB	Con	6.3
Québec	QC	BQ	6.4
Hochelaga	QC	BQ	6.5
Markham—Unionville	ON	Con	6.7
Nipissing—Timiskaming	ON	Con	7.0
Yukon	Terr	Con	7.0
Gaspésie—Les Îles-de-la-Madeleine	QC	BQ	7.1
Nickel Belt	ON	Con	8.0
Coquitlam—Port Coquitlam	BC	Con	8.2
Whitby	ON	Con	8.2
Burlington	ON	Con	8.4
Delta	BC	Con	8.5
Sherbrooke	QC	BQ	8.5
Malpeque	PE	Con	8.7
Oakville North—Burlington	ON	Con	8.8
Hamilton East—Stoney Creek	ON	Con	8.9
Richmond Hill	ON	Con	8.9
Steveston—Richmond East	BC	Con	9.0
York Centre	ON	Con	9.5
Vancouver Centre	BC	NDP	9.7
Margins 10%–20%
Burnaby North—Seymour	BC	NDP	10.4
Pickering—Uxbridge	ON	Con	10.8
St. John's East	NL	NDP	10.9
Louis-Hébert	QC	BQ	11.1
Cape Breton—Canso	NS	Con	11.4
Nepean	ON	Con	11.4
Kingston and the Islands	ON	NDP	11.8
London North Centre	ON	Con	12.0
Eglinton—Lawrence	ON	Con	12.1
Labrador	NL	Con	12.3
Saint-Maurice—Champlain	QC	BQ	12.3
Markham—Stouffville	ON	Con	12.5
Ottawa Centre	ON	NDP	12.5
Glengarry—Prescott—Russell	ON	Con	12.8
Etobicoke Centre	ON	Con	13.1
Mississauga—Streetsville	ON	Con	13.1
Marc-Aurèle-Fortin	QC	BQ	13.3
Saint John—Rothesay	NB	Con	13.5
Thunder Bay—Superior North	ON	NDP	13.6
Winnipeg South	MB	Con	13.7
Central Nova	NS	Con	13.9
Fleetwood—Port Kells	BC	Con	14.4
Vancouver Quadra	BC	Con	14.7
Toronto—Danforth	ON	NDP	14.7
Sackville—Preston—Chezzetcook	NS	Con	14.9
Egmont	PE	Con	15.1
Brampton Centre	ON	Con	15.2
Hamilton West—Ancaster—Dundas	ON	Con	15.4
Kings—Hants	NS	Con	15.5
Etobicoke—Lakeshore	ON	Con	15.5
Charlottetown	PE	Con	15.6
Saint Boniface—Saint Vital	MB	Con	15.8
Avalon	NL	Con	15.8
Surrey Centre	BC	NDP	16.2
Ottawa West—Nepean	ON	Con	16.4
North Vancouver	BC	Con	17.0
Don Valley West	ON	Con	17.2
Mississauga—Erin Mills	ON	Con	17.3
Willowdale	ON	Con	17.3
Waterloo	ON	Con	17.4
Winnipeg South Centre	MB	Con	17.7
Mississauga East—Cooksville	ON	Con	17.7
Guelph	ON	Con	18.0
Milton	ON	Con	18.4
Outremont	QC	NDP	19.4
Dartmouth—Cole Harbour	NS	NDP	19.6
Cardigan	PE	Con	19.7
Margins > 20%
Brampton South	ON	Con	20.6
LaSalle—Émard—Verdun	QC	BQ	20.8
Alfred-Pellan	QC	BQ	21.7
Mississauga—Malton	ON	Con	22.2
University—Rosedale	ON	NDP	22.3
Ottawa South	ON	Con	22.8
Pontiac	QC	Con	22.8
Orléans	ON	Con	23.1
Brampton North	ON	Con	23.5
Winnipeg North	MB	NDP	23.7
Toronto—St. Paul's	ON	Con	23.9
Halifax West	NS	NDP	24.3
Vaudreuil—Soulanges	QC	BQ	24.3
Toronto Centre	ON	NDP	24.4
Don Valley North	ON	Con	24.6
Vancouver South	BC	NDP	24.8
Brampton East	ON	Con	25.3
Ottawa—Vanier	ON	NDP	25.4
Moncton—Riverview—Dieppe	NB	Con	25.7
Mississauga Centre	ON	Con	26.0
Gatineau	QC	BQ	26.6
Vimy	QC	BQ	26.6
Brampton West	ON	Con	27.0
Scarborough—Agincourt	ON	Con	27.5
Papineau	QC	NDP	27.6
Surrey—Newton	BC	NDP	27.9
Madawaska—Restigouche	NB	Con	29.4
Laval—Les Îles	QC	BQ	29.8
Ajax	ON	Con	30.2
Ahuntsic-Cartierville	QC	BQ	30.4
Ville-Marie—Le Sud-Ouest—Île-des-Sœurs	QC	NDP	31.8
St. John's South—Mount Pearl	NL	NDP	32.8
Scarborough Centre	ON	Con	32.2
Mount Royal	QC	Con	33.2
Beaches—East York	ON	NDP	34.1
Brossard—Saint-Lambert	QC	BQ	34.2
Notre-Dame-de-Grâce—Westmount	QC	NDP	34.6
Etobicoke North	ON	Con	34.7
Markham—Thornhill	ON	Con	35.2
Pierrefonds—Dollard	QC	Con	35.2
York South—Weston	ON	Con	35.9
Beauséjour	NB	Con	36.2
Hull—Aylmer	QC	BQ	36.3
Don Valley East	ON	Con	36.4
Scarborough Southwest	ON	Con	36.7
Dorval—Lachine—LaSalle	QC	BQ	36.7
Lac-Saint-Louis	QC	Con	37.4
Scarborough-Guildwood	ON	Con	39.8
Saint-Laurent	QC	Con	40.6
Scarborough—Rouge Park	ON	Con	41.7
Bourassa	QC	BQ	41.7
Humber River—Black Creek	ON	Con	43.3
Honoré-Mercier	QC	BQ	43.7
Scarborough North	ON	Con	47.7
Acadie—Bathurst	NB	Con	51.0
Saint-Léonard—Saint-Michel	QC	Con	58.9
NDP (25 seats)
Margins 5% or less
Nanaimo—Ladysmith	BC	Con	1.7
Edmonton Griesbach	AB	Con	3.4
North Island—Powell River	BC	Con	3.5
Margins 5%–10%
Port Moody—Coquitlam	BC	Con	5.3
South Okanagan—West Kootenay	BC	Con	5.8
Skeena—Bulkley Valley	BC	Con	6.5
Timmins-James Bay	ON	Con	7.9
Burnaby South	BC	Lib	9.9
Margins 10%–20%
Nunavut	Terr	Lib	11.8
Courtenay—Alberni	BC	Con	12.2
Algoma—Manitoulin—Kapuskasing	ON	Con	12.7
Cowichan—Malahat—Langford	BC	Con	14.4
Windsor West	ON	Lib	16.4
Victoria	BC	Lib	16.6
Churchill—Keewatinook Aski	MB	Lib	17.4
London—Fanshawe	ON	Con	19.1
Margins > 20%
Esquimalt—Saanich—Sooke	BC	Lib	20.7
Elmwood—Transcona	MB	Con	21.6
Winnipeg Centre	MB	Lib	21.9
Hamilton Centre	ON	Lib	22.2
Vancouver Kingsway	BC	Lib	24.9
New Westminster—Burnaby	BC	Lib	25.1
Rosemont—La Petite-Patrie	QC	Lib	25.4
Edmonton Strathcona	AB	Con	35.2
Vancouver East	BC	Lib	36.6

Conservative (119 seats)
Margins 5% or less
Coast of Bays—Central—Notre Dame	NL	Lib	0.9
Charleswood—St. James—Assiniboia—Headingley	MB	Lib	1.0
King—Vaughan	ON	Lib	2.2
South Surrey—White Rock	BC	Lib	3.5
South Shore—St. Margarets	NS	Lib	3.8
Edmonton Mill Woods	AB	Lib	3.9
Peterborough—Kawartha	ON	Lib	3.9
Miramichi—Grand Lake	NB	Lib	4.4
Niagara Falls	ON	Lib	4.4
Pitt Meadows—Maple Ridge	BC	NDP	4.8
Bay of Quinte	ON	Lib	4.8
Margins 5%–10%
Flamborough—Glanbrook	ON	Lib	5.1
Saskatoon West	SK	NDP	6.1
Kootenay—Columbia	BC	NDP	6.3
Chicoutimi—Le Fjord	QC	BQ	7.6
Essex	ON	NDP	9.3
Margins 10%–20%
Hastings—Lennox and Addington	ON	Lib	10.2
Edmonton Manning	AB	NDP	10.6
Northumberland—Peterborough South	ON	Lib	11.0
Oshawa	ON	NDP	11.2
Cumberland—Colchester	NS	Lib	11.8
Brantford—Brant	ON	Lib	11.9
Chatham-Kent—Leamington	ON	Lib	12.3
Regina—Lewvan	SK	NDP	12.3
Kildonan—St. Paul	MB	Lib	12.4
Simcoe North	ON	Lib	12.6
Saskatoon—University	SK	NDP	12.6
Kenora	ON	NDP	12.7
Kamloops—Thompson—Cariboo	BC	NDP	14.0
Barrie—Springwater—Oro-Medonte	ON	Lib	14.2
Thornhill	ON	Lib	15.0
Niagara West	ON	Lib	15.2
Carleton	ON	Lib	15.6
Durham	ON	Lib	16.5
Calgary Forest Lawn	AB	Lib	16.8
Calgary Confederation	AB	Lib	17.5
Dufferin—Caledon	ON	Lib	17.7
Kelowna—Lake Country	BC	Lib	18.8
Barrie—Innisfil	ON	Lib	18.8
St. Albert—Edmonton	AB	NDP	19.0
West Nova	NS	Lib	19.1
Chilliwack—Hope	BC	NDP	19.3
Langley—Aldergrove	BC	Lib	19.3
Mission—Matsqui—Fraser Canyon	BC	Lib	19.3
Simcoe—Grey	ON	Lib	19.5
Edmonton West	AB	NDP	19.8
Saskatoon—Grasswood	SK	NDP	19.8
Haldimand—Norfolk	ON	Lib	19.9
Charlesbourg—Haute-Saint-Charles	QC	BQ	19.9
Margins > 20%
Edmonton Riverbend	AB	Lib	20.2
York—Simcoe	ON	Lib	21.0
Calgary Centre	AB	Lib	21.6
Desnethé—Missinippi—Churchill River	SK	Lib	21.9
Lanark—Frontenac—Kingston	ON	Lib	22.5
Regina—Wascana	SK	Lib	23.0
Fundy Royal	NB	Lib	23.4
Abbotsford	BC	Lib	23.7
Bruce—Grey—Owen Sound	ON	Lib	24.0
Perth Wellington	ON	Lib	24.0
Montmagny—L'Islet—Kamouraska—Rivière-du-Loup	QC	BQ	24.2
Huron—Bruce	ON	Lib	24.7
Wellington—Halton Hills	ON	Lib	24.9
Sarnia—Lambton	ON	NDP	25.1
Richmond—Arthabaska	QC	BQ	25.1
Leeds—Grenville—Thousand Islands and Rideau Lakes	ON	Lib	25.3
Central Okanagan—Similkameen—Nicola	BC	NDP	26.1
New Brunswick Southwest	NB	Lib	26.1
Parry Sound-Muskoka	ON	Lib	26.3
Oxford	ON	Lib	26.5
Tobique—Mactaquac	NB	Lib	27.1
North Okanagan—Shuswap	BC	NDP	27.2
Lambton—Kent—Middlesex	ON	Lib	27.8
Bellechasse—Les Etchemins—Lévis	QC	BQ	27.8
Portneuf—Jacques-Cartier	QC	BQ	27.8
Renfrew—Nipissing—Pembroke	ON	NDP	28.5
Haliburton—Kawartha Lakes—Brock	ON	Lib	29.2
Lévis—Lotbinière	QC	BQ	29.9
Beauce	QC	PPC	30.1
Cariboo—Prince George	BC	NDP	30.4
Elgin—Middlesex—London	ON	Lib	30.4
Portage—Lisgar	MB	PPC	30.9
Louis-Saint-Laurent	QC	BQ	31.2
Provencher	MB	Lib	31.7
Stormont—Dundas—South Glengarry	ON	Lib	32.0
Calgary Rocky Ridge	AB	Lib	32.3
Edmonton—Wetaskiwin	AB	NDP	34.7
Calgary Nose Hill	AB	Lib	35.1
Mégantic—L'Érable	QC	BQ	36.2
Lethbridge	AB	NDP	36.3
Sherwood Park—Fort Saskatchewan	AB	NDP	37.0
Selkirk—Interlake—Eastman	MB	NDP	37.7
Brandon—Souris	MB	NDP	39.1
Calgary Heritage	AB	NDP	40.3
Calgary Signal Hill	AB	Lib	40.4
Banff—Airdrie	AB	NDP	40.5
Moose Jaw—Lake Centre—Lanigan	SK	NDP	41.0
Regina—Qu'Appelle	SK	NDP	41.0
Calgary Midnapore	AB	NDP	42.4
Sturgeon River—Parkland	AB	NDP	42.7
Calgary Shepard	AB	NDP	43.9
Dauphin—Swan River—Neepawa	MB	NDP	44.3
Prince George—Peace River—Northern Rockies	BC	NDP	47.2
Prince Albert	SK	NDP	49.8
Red Deer—Lacombe	AB	NDP	50.0
Peace River—Westlock	AB	NDP	50.1
Red Deer—Mountain View	AB	NDP	50.3
Medicine Hat—Cardston—Warner	AB	NDP	51.3
Yellowhead	AB	PPC	53.5
Carlton Trail—Eagle Creek	SK	NDP	55.0
Fort McMurray—Cold Lake	AB	PPC	55.1
Grande Prairie-Mackenzie	AB	NDP	56.2
Yorkton—Melville	SK	NDP	56.5
Battlefords—Lloydminster	SK	NDP	56.7
Foothills	AB	NDP	58.1
Lakeland	AB	PPC	58.3
Bow River	AB	PPC	59.8
Cypress Hills—Grasslands	SK	NDP	61.0
Battle River—Crowfoot	AB	NDP	61.5
Souris—Moose Mountain	SK	PPC	67.3
Bloc Québécois (32 seats)
Margins 5% or less
Trois-Rivières	QC	Con	0.2
Beauport—Limoilou	QC	Con	2.0
Berthier—Maskinongé	QC	NDP	2.2
Longueuil—Saint-Hubert	QC	Lib	2.9
Margins 5%–10%
Rivière-des-Mille-Îles	QC	Lib	5.3
Thérèse-De Blainville	QC	Lib	6.0
Beauport—Côte-de-Beaupré—Île d’Orléans—Charlevoix	QC	Con	6.5
Shefford	QC	Lib	8.4
La Prairie	QC	Lib	9.1
Margins 10%–20%
Montarville	QC	Lib	10.5
Terrebonne	QC	Lib	11.6
Abitibi—Baie-James—Nunavik—Eeyou	QC	Lib	11.9
Jonquière	QC	Con	12.8
La Pointe-de-l'Île	QC	Lib	14.4
Saint-Jean	QC	Lib	17.9
Margins > 20%
Salaberry—Suroît	QC	Lib	20.6
Mirabel	QC	Lib	23.0
Repentigny	QC	Lib	24.1
Rimouski-Neigette—Témiscouata—Les Basques	QC	Lib	24.1
Saint-Hyacinthe—Bagot	QC	Lib	24.8
Lac-Saint-Jean	QC	Con	25.0
Laurentides—Labelle	QC	Lib	25.2
Abitibi—Témiscamingue	QC	Lib	26.5
Drummond	QC	Lib	27.8
Pierre-Boucher—Les Patriotes—Verchères	QC	Lib	28.4
Beloeil—Chambly	QC	Lib	29.4
Rivière-du-Nord	QC	Lib	29.9
Manicouagan	QC	Con	30.8
Joliette	QC	Lib	32.3
Montcalm	QC	Lib	33.4
Bécancour—Nicolet—Saurel	QC	Lib	37.9
Avignon—La Mitis—Matane—Matapédia	QC	Lib	38.3
Green (2 seats)
Kitchener Centre	ON	Con	10.4
Saanich—Gulf Islands	BC	Con	15.1

== Vote shares ==
Projected vs actual election results
Projected seat results as at 15 August 2021, per Forum Research polling

Ridings by party win and strength of vote share

Change in popular vote by party (2021 vs 2019)
Party	2021	2019	Change (pp)
█ Conservative	33.74%	34.34%	-0.60
█ Liberal	32.62%	33.12%	-0.50
█ New Democratic	17.83%	15.98%	1.85
█ Bloc Québécois	7.64%	7.63%	0.01
█ People's	4.94%	1.64%	3.30
█ Green	2.33%	6.55%	-4.22
█ Other	0.90%	0.67%	0.23

=== Trends in vote shares, turnouts and margins of victory ===
Vote shares of 1st-place candidates in the 2015, 2019 and 2021 elections to the Canadian House of Commons, grouped in increments of 5%

Turnouts for Canadian federal elections (2015–2021), grouped in increments of 5%

Margins of victory for Canadian federal elections (2015–2021), grouped in increments of 5%

== Results analysis ==
Seats gained, identified by party

Doughnut chart of popular vote and seat counts

The disproportionality of parliamentary seats won in the 2021 election was 13.40 according to the Gallagher Index, mainly favourable to the Liberals but adverse to the NDP.

Party candidates in 2nd place
Party in 1st place	Party in 2nd place						Total
Party in 1st place	Lib	Con	NDP	BQ	Grn	PPC	Total
Liberal		104	32	24			160
Conservative	58		45	9		7	119
New Democratic	12	13					25
Bloc Québécois	25	6	1				32
Green		2					
Total	95	125	78	33	–	7	338

Principal races, according to 1st and 2nd-place results
Parties		Seats
█ Liberal	█ Conservative	162
█ Conservative	█ New Democratic	58
█ Liberal	█ Bloc Québécois	49
█ Liberal	█ New Democratic	44
█ Conservative	█ Bloc Québécois	15
█ Conservative	█ People's	7
█ Conservative	█ Green	2
█ New Democratic	█ Bloc Québécois	1
Total		338

Party rankings (1st to 5th place)
Party	1st	2nd	3rd	4th	5th
Liberal	160	95	59	22	2
Conservative	119	125	77	16	–
New Democratic	25	78	173	60	2
Bloc Québécois	32	33	7	6	–
Green	2	–	4	31	160
People's	–	7	17	196	78
Maverick	–	–	1	1	17
Ind, NA	–	–	–	3	16
Free	–	–	–	–	10

=== Seats that changed hands ===
Elections to the 44th Parliament of Canada – seats won/lost by party, 2019–2021
Party	2019	Gain from (loss to)												2021
Party	2019	Lib		Con		NDP		BQ		Grn		Ind		2021
Liberal	157			7	(7)	2				1	(1)	1		160
Conservative	121	7	(7)				(2)							119
New Democratic	24		(2)	2						1				25
Bloc Québécois	32													32
Green	3	1	(1)				(1)							2
Independent	1		(1)											–
Total	338	8	(11)	9	(7)	2	(3)	–	–	2	(1)	1	–	338

The following seats changed allegiance from the 2019 election.

Conservative to Liberal

- Aurora—Oak Ridges—Richmond Hill
- Calgary Skyview
- Cloverdale—Langley City
- Edmonton Centre
- Markham—Unionville
- Richmond Centre
- Steveston—Richmond East

Conservative to NDP

- Edmonton Griesbach
- Port Moody—Coquitlam

Liberal to Conservative

- Bay of Quinte
- Coast of Bays—Central—Notre Dame
- Cumberland—Colchester
- King—Vaughan
- Miramichi—Grand Lake
- Peterborough—Kawartha
- South Shore—St. Margarets

Liberal to Green

- Kitchener Centre

NDP to Liberal

- Hamilton Mountain
- St. John's East

Green to Liberal

- Fredericton (Note: The Green MP elected in 2019 defected to the Liberals months before the 2021 election.)

Green to NDP

- Nanaimo—Ladysmith

Independent to Liberal

- Vancouver Granville

=== Defeated MPs ===
Of the 22 seats that changed hands, four were open seats where the MPs chose to retire, and one was where the MP crossed the floor in June and was re-elected under a new banner; the other 17 went down to defeat.

MPs defeated (2021)
Party	Riding	MP	Position held	First elected	Defeated by	Party
█ Conservative	Aurora—Oak Ridges—Richmond Hill	Leona Alleslev	Deputy Leader of the Opposition (2019–2020)	2015	Leah Taylor Roy	█ Liberal
█ Conservative	Calgary Skyview	Jag Sahota	—N/a	2019	George Chahal	█ Liberal
█ Conservative	Cloverdale—Langley City	Tamara Jansen	—N/a	2019	John Aldag	█ Liberal
█ Conservative	Edmonton Centre	James Cumming	Critic for COVID-19 economic recovery	2019	Randy Boissonnault	█ Liberal
█ Conservative	Markham—Unionville	Bob Saroya	—N/a	2015	Paul Chiang	█ Liberal
█ Conservative	Richmond Centre	Alice Wong	—N/a	2008	Wilson Miao	█ Liberal
█ Conservative	Steveston—Richmond East	Kenny Chiu	—N/a	2019	Parm Bains	█ Liberal
█ Conservative	Edmonton Griesbach	Kerry Diotte	—N/a	2015	Blake Desjarlais	█ New Democratic
█ Conservative	Port Moody—Coquitlam	Nelly Shin	—N/a	2019	Bonita Zarrillo	█ New Democratic
█ Liberal	Bay of Quinte	Neil Ellis	Parliamentary Secretary to the Minister of Agriculture and Agri-Food (2019–2021)	2015	Ryan Williams	█ Conservative
█ Liberal	Coast of Bays—Central—Notre Dame	Scott Simms	Chair of the Standing Committee on Canadian Heritage	2004	Clifford Small	█ Conservative
█ Liberal	Cumberland—Colchester	Lenore Zann	—N/a	2019	Stephen Ellis	█ Conservative
█ Liberal	King—Vaughan	Deb Schulte	Minister of Seniors	2015	Anna Roberts	█ Conservative
█ Liberal	Peterborough—Kawartha	Maryam Monsef	Minister for Women and Gender Equality; Minister of Rural Economic Development	2015	Michelle Ferreri	█ Conservative
█ Liberal	South Shore—St. Margarets	Bernadette Jordan	Minister of Fisheries, Oceans, and the Canadian Coast Guard	2015	Rick Perkins	█ Conservative
█ Liberal	Kitchener Centre	Raj Saini	—N/a	2015	Mike Morrice	█ Green
█ Green	Nanaimo—Ladysmith	Paul Manly	—N/a	2019	Lisa Marie Barron	█ New Democratic

=== Open seats that changed hands ===
Of the 31 seats open at dissolution, four were won by a non-incumbent party:

Open seats taken by candidates of other parties (2021)
Party	Candidate	Incumbent retiring from the House	Riding	Won by	Party
█ Liberal	Lisa Harris	Pat Finnigan	Miramichi—Grand Lake	Jake Stewart	█ Conservative
█ New Democratic	Malcolm Allen	Scott Duvall	Hamilton Mountain	Lisa Hepfner	█ Liberal
█ New Democratic	Mary Shortall	Jack Harris	St. John's East	Joanne Thompson	█ Liberal
█ Independent	—N/a	Jody Wilson-Raybould	Vancouver Granville	Taleeb Noormohamed	█ Liberal

=== Disavowed candidates ===
Below are the candidates who were disavowed by their parties and/or voluntarily ceased campaigning after candidate registration closed, remaining on the ballot with their original party affiliation.

Candidate	Electoral district	Province or territory	Date announced	Reason	Placed
Raj Saini	Kitchener Centre	Ontario	September 4, 2021	Ongoing sexual harassment allegations	4th
Lisa Robinson	Beaches—East York	Ontario	September 10, 2021	Alleged Islamophobic tweet (2018) (Note: Robinson claims the Twitter account was fake and reported to Durham police in 2018 after the tweet was made.)	3rd
Sidney Coles	Toronto—St. Paul's	Ontario	September 15, 2021	Antisemitic tweets (2021)	3rd
Daniel Osborne	Cumberland—Colchester	Nova Scotia	September 15, 2021	Antisemitic tweets (2019)	3rd
Kevin Vuong	Spadina—Fort York	Ontario	September 17, 2021	Sexual assault charge (dropped in 2019) and failure to disclose same to the party	1st (elected)
Michael Lariviere	Renfrew—Nipissing—Pembroke	Ontario	September 20, 2021	Unspecified; probably associating proof-of-vaccination systems with Nazism at election debate	5th

=== MPs standing under a different political affiliation ===
Jenica Atwin, who was elected as the Green Party candidate in Fredericton in 2019, switched party affiliation to the Liberal Party in June 2021, and was re-elected as a Liberal. Two MPs elected in 2019 contested the election but left their party affiliation blank when they registered; however, both failed to be re-elected.

Outgoing MP	2019 party	2019 riding	2021 affiliation	2021 riding	Outcome
Jenica Atwin	█ Green	Fredericton	█ Liberal	Fredericton	Won
Michel Boudrias	█ Bloc Québécois	Terrebonne	█ No Affiliation	Terrebonne	Lost
Derek Sloan	█ Conservative	Hastings—Lennox and Addington	█ No Affiliation	Banff—Airdrie	Lost

== Significant results among independent and minor party candidates ==
Those candidates not belonging to a major party, receiving more than 1,000 votes in the election, are listed below:

Significant vote tallies for independent and minor party candidates
Riding		Candidate		Votes	Placed
Banff—Airdrie	AB	█ Maverick	Tariq Elnaga	1,475	6th
Banff—Airdrie	AB	█ No Affiliation	Derek Sloan	2,020	5th
Battle River—Crowfoot	AB	█ Maverick	Jeff Golka	2,393	6th
Bow River	AB	█ Maverick	Orrin Bliss	1,368	5th
Foothills	AB	█ Maverick	Josh Wylie	2,289	5th
Grande Prairie-Mackenzie	AB	█ Maverick	Ambrose Ralph	2,195	5th
Lethbridge	AB	█ Independent	Kim Siever	1,179	5th
Medicine Hat—Cardston—Warner	AB	█ Maverick	Geoff Shoesmith	1,226	5th
Peace River—Westlock	AB	█ Maverick	Colin Krieger	2,573	4th
Red Deer—Mountain View	AB	█ Maverick	Mark Wilcox	1,640	5th
Sturgeon River—Parkland	AB	█ Maverick	Jeff Dunham	1,240	5th
Yellowhead	AB	█ Maverick	Todd Muir	1,761	5th
Prince George—Peace River—Northern Rockies	BC	█ Maverick	David Jeffers	1,580	6th
Provencher	MB	█ Independent	Rick Loewen	1,366	5th
Madawaska—Restigouche	NB	█ Free	Louis Bérubé	1,277	5th
Alfred-Pellan	QC	█ Free	Dwayne Cappelletti	1,277	5th
Beauce	QC	█ Free	Chantale Giguère	1,096	6th
Bécancour—Nicolet—Saurel	QC	█ Free	André Blanchette	1,215	5th
Bellechasse—Les Etchemins—Lévis	QC	█ Free	Raymond Arcand	1,793	5th
Drummond	QC	█ Free	Josée Joyal	1,728	5th
Laurentides—Labelle	QC	█ Free	Michel Leclerc	1,165	7th
Louis-Saint-Laurent	QC	█ Free	Mélanie Fortin	1,089	6th
Mirabel	QC	█ Free	Ariane Croteau	1,182	7th
Repentigny	QC	█ Free	Pierre Duval	2,025	5th
Rimouski-Neigette—Témiscouata—Les Basques	QC	█ Independent	Noémi Bureau-Civil	1,467	5th
Rivière-du-Nord	QC	█ Free	Marie-Eve Damour	1,036	6th
Saint-Jean	QC	█ Free	Jean-Charles Cléroux	1,790	5th
Terrebonne	QC	█ No Affiliation	Michel Boudrias	3,864	5th
Vaudreuil—Soulanges	QC	█ Free	Ginette Destrempes	1,288	6th
Battlefords—Lloydminster	SK	█ Maverick	Ken Rutherford	2,162	3rd
Carlton Trail—Eagle Creek	SK	█ Maverick	Diane Pastoor	1,053	5th
Cypress Hills—Grasslands	SK	█ Maverick	Mark Skagen	1,360	5th
Northwest Territories	Terr	█ Independent	Jane Groenewegen	1,791	4th
Yukon	Terr	█ Independent	Jonas Jacot Smith	2,639	4th

== Results by province ==
Proportion of seats and votes won in each province/territory, by party (2021)
Province	Liberal	Conservative	NDP	Bloc	Green	People's
Ontario	78 / 121	37 / 121	5 / 121		1 / 121	
Ontario	39.3% 2,532,446	34.9% 2,249,485	17.8% 1,151,788		2.2% 143,218	5.5% 352,076
Quebec	35 / 78	10 / 78	1 / 78	32 / 78	0 / 78	
Quebec	33.6% 1,361,291	18.6% 755,548	9.8% 395,959	32.1% 1,301,758	1.5% 61,730	2.7% 109,046
British Columbia	15 / 42	13 / 42	13 / 42		1 / 42	
British Columbia	27.0% 602,248	33.2% 741,043	29.2% 650,606		5.3% 117,951	4.9% 109,676
Alberta	2 / 34	30 / 34	2 / 34		0 / 34	
Alberta	15.5% 300,099	55.3% 1,073,103	19.1% 370,344		0.9% 17,573	7.4% 142,673
Manitoba	4 / 14	7 / 14	3 / 14		0 / 14	
Manitoba	27.9% 159,498	39.2% 224,168	23.0% 131,830		1.7% 9,518	7.6% 43,603
Saskatchewan	0 / 14	14 / 14	0 / 14		0 / 14	
Saskatchewan	10.6% 54,685	59.0% 304,392	21.1% 108,611		1.1% 5,734	6.6% 34,164
Nova Scotia	8 / 11	3 / 11	0 / 11		0 / 11	
Nova Scotia	42.3% 206,812	29.4% 143,764	22.1% 108,092		1.9% 9,189	4.0% 19,481
New Brunswick	6 / 10	4 / 10	0 / 10		0 / 10	
New Brunswick	42.4% 168,817	33.6% 133,794	11.9% 47,564		5.2% 20,505	6.1% 24,370
Newfoundland and Labrador	6 / 7	1 / 7	0 / 7		0 / 7	
Newfoundland and Labrador	47.7% 103,062	32.5% 70,213	17.4% 37,550		0.0% 0 (Note: The Greens did not run a candidate in Newfoundland and Labrador.)	2.4% 5,142
Prince Edward Island	4 / 4	0 / 4	0 / 4		0 / 4	
Prince Edward Island	46.2% 38,956	31.6% 26,673	9.2% 7,712		9.6% 8,048	3.2% 2,738
Northern Canada (Note: (Yukon, Northwest Territories, and Nunavut).)	2 / 3	0 / 3	1 / 3		0 / 3	
Northern Canada	35.3% 14,446	20.4% 8,332	35.2% 12,395		3.1% 1,274 (Note: The Greens did not run a candidate in Nunavut.)	0.0% 0 (Note: The People's Party did not run a candidate in any of the Canadian Territories.)
Total	160 / 338	119 / 338	25 / 338	32 / 338	2 / 338	0 / 338
Total	32.6% 5,556,629	33.7% 5,747,410	17.8% 3,036,348	7.6% 1,301,758	2.3% 396,988	4.9% 840,993

Turnout by province (2021 vs 2019)
Province	2021	2019	Change (pp)
Ontario	61.8%	66.3%	-4.5
Quebec	62.4%	67.3%	-4.9
British Columbia	60.4%	66.0%	-5.6
Alberta	64.6%	69.2%	-4.6
Manitoba	61.9%	64.3%	-2.4
Saskatchewan	64.4%	72.6%	-8.2
Nova Scotia	63.2%	69.8%	-6.6
New Brunswick	64.2%	72.1%	-7.9
Newfoundland and Labrador	52.1%	58.8%	-6.7
Prince Edward Island	71.4%	74.0%	-2.6

=== Ontario ===
Results in Ontario (2021 vs 2019)
Party	Seats			
Party	2019	Gained	Lost	2021
Liberal	79	2	-3	78
Conservative	36	3	-2	37
New Democratic	6		-1	5
Green	–	1	–	1
Total	121			

Change in popular vote by party (2021 vs 2019)
Party	2021	2019	Change (pp)
█ Liberal	39.3%	41.6%	-2.3
█ Conservative	34.9%	33.1%	1.8
█ New Democratic	17.8%	16.8%	1.0
█ People's	5.5%	1.6%	3.9
█ Green	2.2%	6.2%	-4.0
█ Other	0.3%	0.2%	0.1

=== Quebec ===
Results in Quebec (2021 vs 2019)
Party	Seats			
Party	2019	Gained	Lost	2021
Liberal	35	–	–	35
Bloc Québécois	32	–	–	32
Conservative	10	–	–	10
New Democratic	1	–	–	1
Total	78			

Change in popular vote by party (2021 vs 2019)
Party	2021	2019	Change (pp)
█ Liberal	33.6%	34.3%	-0.7
█ Bloc Québécois	32.1%	32.4%	-0.3
█ Conservative	18.6%	16.0%	2.6
█ New Democratic	9.8%	10.8%	-1.0
█ People's	2.7%	1.5%	1.2
█ Green	1.5%	4.5%	-3.0
█ Free	1.1%	New	1.1
█ Other	0.6%	0.1%	0.5

=== British Columbia ===
Results in BC (2021 vs 2019)
Party	Seats			
Party	2019	Gained	Lost	2021
Conservative	17	–	-4	13
Liberal	11	4	–	15
New Democratic	11	2	–	13
Green	2	–	-1	1
Independent	1	–	-1	–
Total	42			

Change in popular vote by party (2021 vs 2019)
Party	2021	2019	Change (pp)
█ Conservative	33.2%	34.0%	-0.8
█ New Democratic	29.2%	24.4%	4.8
█ Liberal	27.0%	26.2%	0.8
█ Green	5.3%	12.5%	-7.2
█ People's	4.9%	1.7%	3.2
█ Other	0.4%	0.9%	-0.5

=== Alberta ===
Results in Alberta (2021 vs 2019)
Party	Seats			
Party	2019	Gained	Lost	2021
Conservative	33	–	-3	30
Liberal	–	2	–	2
New Democratic	1	1	–	2
Total	34			

Change in popular vote by party (2021 vs 2019)
Party	2021	2019	Change (pp)
█ Conservative	55.3%	69.0%	-13.7
█ New Democratic	19.1%	11.6%	7.5
█ Liberal	15.5%	13.8%	1.7
█ People's	7.4%	2.2%	5.2
█ Maverick	1.3%	New	1.3
█ Green	0.9%	2.8%	-1.9
█ Other	0.5%	0.8%	-0.3

== Post-election analysis ==
=== Elections Canada ===
Elections Canada reported the following general characteristics of voter turnout in the election, compared to 2019:

Estimated voter turnout %, by age and sex, all Canada (2021 v 2019)
Age group	All voters			Male			Female		
Age group	2021	2019	Change (pp)	2021	2019	Change (pp)	2021	2019	Change (pp)
First-time voters	44.7	53.6	8.9▼	41.3	49.7	8.4▼	48.3	57.7	9.4▼
Not first time	47.4	54.2	6.8▼	43.7	50.2	6.5▼	51.3	58.4	7.1▼
18–24 yrs	46.7	53.9	7.2▼	43.1	49.9	6.8▼	50.5	58.0	7.5▼
25–34 yrs	52.8	58.4	5.6▼	49.9	55.5	5.6▼	55.8	61.3	5.5▼
35–44 yrs	59.0	64.6	5.6▼	57.5	62.7	5.2▼	60.5	66.4	5.9▼
45–54 yrs	63.8	68.1	4.3▼	62.5	66.7	4.2▼	65.0	69.5	4.5▼
55–64 yrs	68.3	73.3	5.0▼	66.7	71.9	5.2▼	69.8	74.6	4.8▼
65–74 yrs	74.9	79.1	4.2▼	74.3	78.9	4.6▼	75.6	79.2	3.6▼
75 yrs +	65.9	68.6	2.7▼	67.7	72.3	4.6▼	64.3	65.7	1.4▼
All ages	62.2	67.0	4.8▼	60.6	65.5	4.9▼	63.8	68.5	4.7▼

Together with Statistics Canada through its Labour Force Survey, analysis was undertaken in both 2019 and 2021 as to the reasons people gave for not voting:

Reasons for not voting, %, 2021 (vs 2019, where applicable)
Reason for not voting	Total Non-Voters			Youth, aged 18–24			Indigenous living off reserve			Immigrant (>10 years)	Immigrant (10 years or less)
Reason for not voting	2021	2019	Change (pp)	2021	2019	Change (pp)	2021	2019	Change (pp)	2021	2021
Everyday life reasons	43.3	45.9	2.6▼	42.1	45.7	3.6▼	38.4	40.8	2.4▼	48.6	44.7
Political reasons	39.1	41.9	2.8▼	36.3	39.1	2.8▼	41.7	47.6	5.9▼	34.5	22.4
Electoral process reasons	7.1	5.4	1.7▲	12.2	8.2	4.0▲	6.3	6.9	0.6▼	6.9	16.5
Reasons related to COVID-19	2.2	New		0.8	New		N/A			3.1	N/A
All other reasons	8.3	6.8	1.5▲	8.6	7.0	1.6▲	11.3	4.8	6.5▲	6.8	13.2

=== From polling firms after Election Day ===
==== Per Ipsos ====
Ipsos 2021 election day poll
Social group	Liberal	Conservative	NDP	Bloc	Green	PPC	Other
Actual results
Total vote	32	34	18	7	2	5	1
Gender
Male	31	37	16	5	2	7	1
Female	33	32	19	10	3	3	1
Age
18–34	38	24	25	5	2	5	–
35–54	32	32	18	9	2	6	2
55+	28	43	14	7	3	4	1

=== Canadian Election Study ===
The 2021 Canadian Election Study (CES) comprised two phases: a Campaign Period Survey (CPS) and a Post-Election Survey (PES). The CPS involved three components—“CPS,” “CPS Modules,” and “CPS Oversample”—which were consolidated into a final dataset of 20,968 respondents. Data collection for the CPS was conducted between August 17 and September 19, 2021. The PES followed shortly after, occurring from September 23 to October 4, 2021, and yielded a sample size of 15,069.

The survey's core questions were adapted from prior iterations of the CES to maintain consistency and focus on key topics, including voting intentions, demographics, issue positions, partisanship, and political engagement.

The 2021 CES was directed by a team of researchers: Laura Stephenson, Allison Harell, Daniel Rubenson, and Peter Loewen.

The data presented include questions from the CPS and PES, cross-tabulated with 2021 voting preferences. The weights applied to the data were adjusted to align with the actual results of the 2021 Canadian federal election.

==== Demographics ====
Demographic Subgroup	LPC	CPC	NDP	BQC	GPC	PPC	Other	Sample
Total Vote	32.6	33.7	17.8	7.6	2.3	4.9	0.9	15,069
Gender
Men	30.9	38.2	13.1	9.7	1.9	5.2	1.1	6,245
Women	34.5	29.1	22.7	5.4	2.8	4.7	0.7	5,830
Age
18-29	28.7	19.9	36.3	5.4	3.2	5.8	0.7	1,734
30-39	33.0	28.8	21.7	6.0	2.5	6.5	1.4	1,991
40-49	31.5	30.7	17.8	9.0	2.9	7.0	1.2	1,995
50-59	34.2	37.4	12.9	8.1	1.6	4.8	1.0	1,941
60-69	33.5	37.3	12.3	10.2	1.9	4.0	0.8	2,414
70-79	33.8	43.5	10.0	7.8	1.7	2.6	0.6	1,241
80+	34.7	49.3	8.7	3.8	2.6	0.9	0.0	787
Language
English	34.4	36.3	20.2	0.4	2.5	5.4	0.8	9,639
French	25.8	23.6	8.6	36.0	1.6	3.2	1.2	2,464
Highest Education Attainment
High School or Less	28.9	36.2	18.1	8.8	2.1	4.8	1.1	5,733
College	30.2	34.6	17.9	7.3	2.4	6.7	0.8	3,052
University	41.3	28.7	17.3	6.0	2.6	3.3	0.7	3,307
Religion
Atheist	30.1	26.2	25.8	9.0	2.9	5.2	0.8	3,608
Agnostic	30.9	25.7	27.7	5.8	4.3	4.9	0.7	753
Buddhist	43.2	24.7	25.0	1.1	2.8	3.3	0.0	119
Hindu	55.0	25.0	19.0	0.0	0.0	1.0	0.0	113
Jewish	42.6	43.7	10.2	0.0	1.3	1.7	0.6	177
Muslim/Islam	71.1	5.0	21.5	0.0	0.3	1.6	0.5	184
Sikh	72.6	6.6	15.0	0.0	0.0	5.7	0.0	68
Christian	32.1	40.4	11.9	8.4	1.9	4.4	1.0	6,248
Catholic	35.1	33.8	10.1	14.8	1.6	3.6	0.9	3,414
Mainline Protestant	28.2	49.4	13.6	0.5	2.3	4.9	1.1	2,616
Other Christian	32.4	35.4	18.0	0.9	2.6	9.6	1.2	219
Other Religion	25.7	34.6	17.9	4.1	3.3	12.4	2.0	374
Race
East Asian	48.9	26.3	20.3	0.2	1.9	2.3	0.1	719
Black	57.0	14.2	20.5	2.3	3.0	2.8	0.3	204
Indigenous	26.9	28.0	25.2	5.2	3.4	9.7	1.5	393
Latino	39.4	26.5	19.5	7.0	2.9	4.0	0.7	124
South Asian	60.6	13.6	22.9	0.0	0.5	2.5	0.0	323
Southeast Asian	44.8	23.9	28.4	0.0	1.3	1.6	0.0	171
West Asian	47.9	18.4	22.9	1.0	3.0	2.5	4.4	144
White	29.6	35.8	17.6	8.7	2.3	5.0	0.9	9,545
Other	26.6	28.3	19.5	4.2	3.8	13.8	3.8	238
Income
0-30,000	31.9	27.0	22.2	7.7	3.2	6.6	1.4	1,902
30,001-60,000	30.6	32.4	20.3	9.2	2.4	4.3	0.8	3,109
60,001-90,000	32.6	34.9	16.8	7.2	2.8	5.0	0.8	2,892
90,001-110,000	33.5	38.3	15.5	7.3	1.4	3.5	0.5	1,254
110,001-150,000	34.9	36.5	14.2	7.1	1.7	4.5	1.1	1,588
150,001-200,000	32.8	38.6	14.2	7.3	2.1	4.8	0.3	639
>200,000	40.1	36.9	10.8	4.3	1.6	4.9	1.3	339
Home Ownership
Own a residence	32.6	38.5	13.9	7.6	2.0	4.7	0.8	8,348
Don't own a residence	32.7	23.2	26.5	7.8	3.1	5.5	1.1	3,754
Do you live in...
A rural area or village	23.4	43.2	14.6	6.5	2.6	7.2	2.5	1,097
A town	25.6	37.6	15.6	10.9	2.9	6.2	1.2	2,861
A suburb	35.2	34.6	15.6	7.5	1.6	5.0	0.5	2,892
A city	37.0	29.3	20.7	6.2	2.4	3.7	0.6	5,182
Marital Status
Married	34.1	40.7	13.2	4.8	2.0	4.4	0.9	5,652
Not Married	31.4	27.6	21.9	10.2	2.7	5.4	0.9	6,450
Do you have children?
Yes	31.6	39.3	13.8	7.6	1.8	4.9	1.0	7,079
No	34.0	25.7	23.5	7.8	3.1	5.0	0.8	4,996
Employment
Full-time	34.1	31.1	17.6	8.4	2.5	5.0	1.2	4,892
Part-time	28.5	31.6	23.8	5.9	3.1	6.8	0.3	866
Self employed	31.9	40.3	13.7	4.4	2.0	6.6	1.1	643
Retired	34.0	41.8	10.4	8.6	1.9	2.7	0.6	3,439
Unemployed	34.3	24.6	26.2	4.6	3.3	6.2	0.9	471
Student	27.9	16.6	40.0	7.0	3.5	4.6	0.5	508
Caregiver/Homemaker	26.7	37.5	21.5	1.1	1.5	10.4	1.4	364
Disabled	25.4	28.7	31.5	2.9	1.4	8.9	1.2	376
Do you belong to a union?
Yes	31.4	27.4	20.4	11.8	3.0	5.0	1.0	2,294
No	32.9	35.3	17.2	6.7	2.2	4.9	0.9	9,745
