= Chris Malette =

Canadian politician

Chris Malette MP

Member of Parliament for Bay of Quinte
- Incumbent
- Assumed office April 28, 2025
- Preceded by: Ryan Williams

Personal details
- Born: 1956 or 1957 (age 68–69)
- Party: Liberal
- Spouse: Sandi Wight
- Children: 2
- Website: chrismalette.liberal.ca

Christopher John Malette is a Canadian politician and journalist who has served as the member of Parliament for the riding of Bay of Quinte since 2025 as a member of the Liberal Party of Canada. Prior to entering federal politics, he served as a municipal councillor for Belleville, Ontario from 2018 to 2025.

== Background ==
Before entering politics, Malette worked as a journalist, editor, and photographer for 36 years, primarily for The Belleville Intelligencer, retiring in 2013.

== Political career ==
=== Municipal politics ===
Malette was first elected to Belleville City Council in the 2018 municipal election, representing Ward 1, and he was re-elected in the 2022 election. During his time on council, he served as chair of the Green Task Force.

=== Federal politics ===
On March 26, 2025, Malette was confirmed as the Liberal Party's candidate for the riding of Bay of Quinte in advance of the 2025 federal election. On April 28, he unseated Conservative incumbent Ryan Williams. His seat on the city council was declared vacant on May 12.

In June 2025, Malette was appointed to the House of Commons Standing Committee on National Defence. CFB Trenton is located within his riding.

== Personal life ==
Malette and his wife, Sandi Wight, have two daughters.

== Electoral record ==
2025 Canadian federal election: Bay of Quinte
Party	Candidate	Votes	%	±%	Expenditures
Liberal	Chris Malette	32,846	50.39	+13.37	
Conservative	Ryan Williams	29,130	44.69	+4.10	
New Democratic	Kate Crothers	2,373	3.64	−11.61	
Green	Erica Charlton	833	1.28	−0.92	
Total valid votes/expense limit		65,182	99.45		
Total rejected ballots		359	0.55		
Turnout		65,541	69.89		
Eligible voters		93,784			
Liberal notional gain from Conservative		Swing		+4.64	
Source: Elections Canada
Note: number of eligible voters does not include voting day registrations.
