= Belleville City Council =

Governing body of Belleville, Ontario

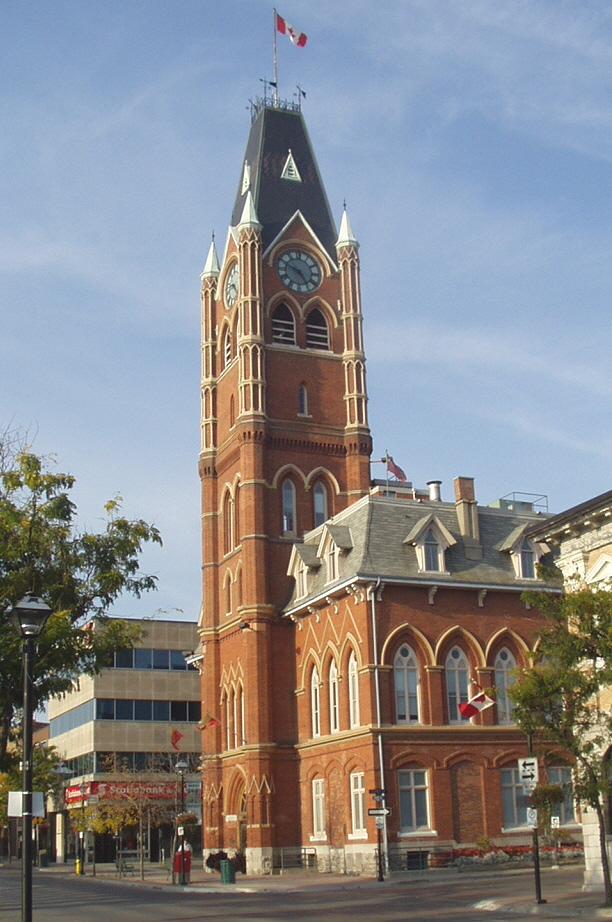
Belleville City Hall, 2007.

Belleville City Council is the governing body for the city of Belleville, Ontario, Canada.

The council consists of the Mayor of Belleville, Paul Fleming and 8 ward councillors across its two wards; 6 are elected from the first ward and 2 from the second. Each councillor serves on various city committees. The council operates in the Belleville City Hall.

Municipal elections are held every four years. The last election took place October 26, 2026.

== Wards ==
Belleville is divided into two wards for the purpose of municipal organization.

- Ward 1 (Belleville) comprises the southernmost area of Belleville below Ontario Highway 401 between Walbridge-Loyalist Road in the west and just past Haig Road in the east.
- Ward 2 (Thurlow) comprises the southernmost point of Point Anne, and north to Clearview Road, west to Sidney Street, and east to the border of Tyendinaga, Ontario.
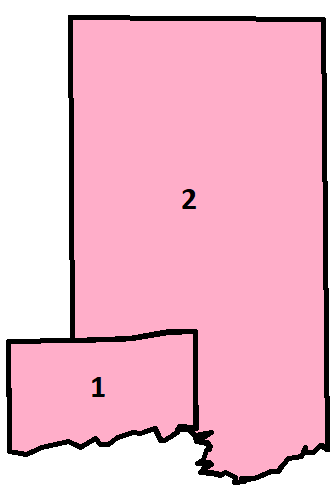
  Map of Belleville's wards

== Members 2026-present ==
Elected in the 2026 municipal election

Councillor	Ward
Paul Fleming	Mayor
Garnet Thompson	Ward 1
Lori Borthwick	Ward 1
Kelly Henderson	Ward 1
Barbara Enright-Miller	Ward 1
Sean Kelly	Ward 1
Margaret Seu	Ward 1
Paul Carr	Ward 2
Kathryn Brown	Ward 2

== Members 2022-2026 ==
Elected in the 2022 municipal election

Councillor	Ward	Notes
Neil Ellis	Mayor	
Tyler Allsopp	Ward 1 (Resigned: 2024)	
Garnet Thompson	Ward 1	
Chris Malette	Ward 1 (Resigned: 2025)	
Sean Kelly	Ward 1	
Lisa Anne Chatten	Ward 1	
Barbara Enright-Miller	Ward 1	
Margaret Seu	Ward 1	Replaced Tyler Allsopp following his election as an MPP.
Kelly Henderson (McCaw)	Ward 1	Replaced Chris Malette following his election as an MP.
Paul Carr	Ward 2	
Kathryn Brown	Ward 2	

== Members 2018-2022 ==
Elected in the 2018 municipal election

Councillor	Ward	Notes
Mitch Panciuk	Mayor	
Ryan Williams	Ward 1 (Resigned: 2021)	
Garnet Thompson	Ward 1	
Pat Culhane	Ward 1	
Chris Malette	Ward 1	
Kelly McCaw	Ward 1	
Barbara Enright-Miller	Ward 1	
Sean Kelly	Ward 1	Replaced Ryan Williams following his election as an MP.
Carol Feeney	Ward 1	
Paul Carr	Ward 2	
Bill Sandison	Ward 2	

== Members 2014-2018 ==
Elected in the 2014 municipal election

Councillor	Ward
Taso Christopher	Mayor
Jack Miller	Ward 1
Egerton Boyce	Ward 1
Kelly McCaw	Ward 1
Mike Graham	Ward 1
Mitch Panciuk	Ward 1
Garnet Thompson	Ward 1
Jackie Denyes	Ward 2
Paul Carr	Ward 2

== Members 2010-2014 ==
Elected in the 2010 municipal election

Councillor	Ward
Neil Ellis	Mayor
Jack Miller	Ward 1
Tom Lafferty	Ward 1
Pat Culhane	Ward 1
Jodie Jenkins	Ward 1
Garnet Thompson	Ward 1
Egerton Boyce	Ward 1
Jackie Denyes	Ward 2
Taso Christopher	Ward 2

== See also ==
- Belleville City Council
