= Bay of Quinte (federal electoral district) =

Federal electoral district in Ontario, Canada

Coordinates: 44.079°N 77.295°W

Ontario electoral district
- Interactive map of riding boundaries from the 2025 federal election

Federal electoral district
- Legislature: House of Commons
MP
Chris Malette
Liberal
- District created: 2013
- First contested: 2015
- Last contested: 2025
- District webpage: profile, map

Demographics
- Population (2016): 109,735
- Electors (2021): 94,197
- Area (km²): 1,621.34
- Pop. density (per km²): 67.7
- Census division(s): Hastings, Prince Edward
- Census subdivision(s): Belleville (part), Quinte West (part), Prince Edward

Bay of Quinte (French: Baie de Quinte) is a federal electoral district in central Ontario, Canada, centred on the Bay of Quinte.

== Demographics ==
According to the 2021 Canadian census

Languages: 90.6% English, 2.3% French
Religions: 53.5% Christian (18.2% Catholic, 10.3% United Church, 6.7% Anglican, 1.6% Presbyterian, 1.6% Baptist, 1.3% Pentecostal, 13.8% Other), 43.5% None
Median income: $39,200 (2020)
Average income: $49,160 (2020)

Panethnic groups in Bay of Quinte (2011−2021)
| Panethnic group | 2021 | | 2016 | | 2011 | |
| Panethnic group | Pop. | % | Pop. | % | Pop. | % |
|---|---|---|---|---|---|---|
| European (Note: Statistic includes all persons that did not make up part of a visible minority or an indigenous identity.) | 101,070 | 88.85% | 98,140 | 91.6% | 99,690 | 93.16% |
| Indigenous | 5,640 | 4.96% | 4,830 | 4.51% | 3,945 | 3.69% |
| South Asian | 2,180 | 1.92% | 870 | 0.81% | 680 | 0.64% |
| African | 1,445 | 1.27% | 845 | 0.79% | 835 | 0.78% |
| East Asian (Note: Statistic includes total responses of "Chinese", "Korean", and "Japanese" under visible minority section on census.) | 1,095 | 0.96% | 930 | 0.87% | 910 | 0.85% |
| Southeast Asian (Note: Statistic includes total responses of "Filipino" and "Southeast Asian" under visible minority section on census.) | 880 | 0.77% | 630 | 0.59% | 345 | 0.32% |
| Latin American | 665 | 0.58% | 385 | 0.36% | 205 | 0.19% |
| Middle Eastern (Note: Statistic includes total responses of "West Asian" and "Arab" under visible minority section on census.) | 315 | 0.28% | 205 | 0.19% | 210 | 0.2% |
| Other/multiracial (Note: Statistic includes total responses of "Visible minority, n.i.e." and "Multiple visible minorities" under visible minority section on census.) | 465 | 0.41% | 310 | 0.29% | 180 | 0.17% |
| Total responses | 113,755 | 98.05% | 107,140 | 97.64% | 107,010 | 97.74% |
| Total population | 116,016 | 100% | 109,735 | 100% | 109,488 | 100% |
Notes: Totals greater than 100% due to multiple origin responses. Demographics based on 2012 Canadian federal electoral redistribution riding boundaries.

== Geography ==
The riding contains the municipalities of Prince Edward County, and the part of Belleville and Quinte West south of Highway 401 and all of Quinte West west of the Trent River and the Frankford area.

== History ==
Bay of Quinte was created by the 2012 federal electoral boundaries redistribution and was legally defined in the 2013 representation order. It came into effect upon the call of the 2015 Canadian federal election, held 19 October 2015. It was created out of parts of the electoral districts of Prince Edward—Hastings (62%) and Northumberland—Quinte West (38%). It originally contained the municipalities of Prince Edward County, Quinte West and the part of Belleville south of Highway 401.

Following the 2022 Canadian federal electoral redistribution, it lost the area of Quinte West north of the 401 and east of the Trent River (except for the Frankford area) to Hastings—Lennox and Addington—Tyendinaga.

=== Members of Parliament ===
This riding has elected the following members of Parliament:

| Parliament | Years | Member | Party |
|---|---|---|---|
Bay of Quinte; Riding created from Northumberland—Quinte West and Prince Edward—Hastings
| 42nd | 2015–2019 | Neil Ellis | Liberal |
| 43rd | 2019–2021 | Neil Ellis | Liberal |
| 44th | 2021–2025 | Ryan Williams | Conservative |
| 45th | 2025–present | Chris Malette | Liberal |

== Election results ==
2025 Canadian federal election
| Party | Candidate | Votes | % | ±% | Expenditures |
|---|---|---|---|---|---|
| Liberal | Chris Malette | 32,846 | 50.39 | +13.37 | |
| Conservative | Ryan Williams | 29,130 | 44.69 | +4.10 | |
| New Democratic | Kate Crothers | 2,373 | 3.64 | −11.61 | |
| Green | Erica Charlton | 833 | 1.28 | −0.92 | |
| Total valid votes/expense limit | | 65,182 | 99.45 | | |
| Total rejected ballots | | 359 | 0.55 | | |
| Turnout | | 65,541 | 69.89 | | |
| Eligible voters | | 93,784 | | | |
| Liberal notional gain from Conservative | | Swing | | +4.64 | |
Source: Elections Canada
Note: number of eligible voters does not include voting day registrations.

2021 federal election redistributed results
| Party | Vote | % |
|---|---|---|
| Conservative | 23,671 | 40.59 |
| Liberal | 21,590 | 37.02 |
| New Democratic | 8,897 | 15.25 |
| People's | 2,878 | 4.93 |
| Green | 1,286 | 2.20 |
| Total valid votes | 58,322 | 99.34 |
| Rejected ballots | 390 | 0.66 |
| Registered voters/ estimated turnout | 90,937 | 64.56 |

2021 Canadian federal election
| Party | Candidate | Votes | % | ±% | Expenditures |
|---|---|---|---|---|---|
| Conservative | Ryan Williams | 25,479 | 41.3 | +4.5 | $93,825.48 |
| Liberal | Neil Ellis | 22,542 | 36.5 | -2.6 | $99,915.72 |
| New Democratic | Stephanie Bell | 9,284 | 15.0 | -1.0 | $10,138.56 |
| People's | Janine LeClerc | 3,045 | 4.9 | +2.9 | $4,474.11 |
| Green | Erica Charlton | 1,350 | 2.2 | -3.9 | $6,273.82 |
| Total valid votes | | 61,700 | | | |
| Total rejected ballots | | 405 | | | |
| Turnout | | 62,105 | 64.95 | | |
| Eligible voters | | 95,615 | | | |
| Conservative gain from Liberal | | Swing | | +5.6 | |
Source: Elections Canada

2019 Canadian federal election
| Party | Candidate | Votes | % | ±% | Expenditures |
|---|---|---|---|---|---|
| Liberal | Neil Ellis | 24,099 | 39.16 | -11.58 | $96,721.36 |
| Conservative | Tim Durkin | 22,650 | 36.80 | +2.53 | $55,922.84 |
| New Democratic | Stephanie Bell | 9,851 | 16.01 | +3.87 | none listed |
| Green | Danny Celovsky | 3,740 | 6.08 | +3.86 | $592.37 |
| People's | Paul Bordonaro | 1,207 | 1.96 | | none listed |
| Total valid votes/expense limit | | 61,547 | 99.25 | | |
| Total rejected ballots | | 464 | 0.75 | +0.38 | |
| Turnout | | 62,011 | 65.83 | -2.30 | |
| Eligible voters | | 94,197 | | | |
| Liberal hold | | Swing | | -7.05 | |
Source: Elections Canada

2015 Canadian federal election
| Party | Candidate | Votes | % | ±% | Expenditures |
|---|---|---|---|---|---|
| Liberal | Neil Ellis | 29,281 | 50.74 | +29.86 | $118,473.86 |
| Conservative | Jodie Jenkins | 19,781 | 34.27 | −17.53 | $109,092.53 |
| New Democratic | Terry Cassidy | 7,001 | 12.13 | −10.88 | $21,205.50 |
| Green | Rachel Nelems | 1,278 | 2.21 | −1.56 | – |
| Independent | Trueman Tuck | 372 | 0.64 | – | $4,425.20 |
| Total valid votes/expense limit | | 57,713 | 99.64 | | $221,051.99 |
| Total rejected ballots | | 211 | 0.36 | – | |
| Turnout | | 57,924 | 68.13 | – | |
| Eligible voters | | 85,021 | | | |
| Liberal notional gain from Conservative | | Swing | | +23.69 | |
Source: Elections Canada

2011 federal election redistributed results
| Party | Vote | % |
|---|---|---|
| Conservative | 25,906 | 51.81 |
| New Democratic | 11,508 | 23.01 |
| Liberal | 10,441 | 20.88 |
| Green | 1,886 | 3.77 |
| Others | 265 | 0.53 |

== See also ==
- List of Canadian electoral districts
- Historical federal electoral districts of Canada
