= Neil Ellis (politician) =

Canadian politician

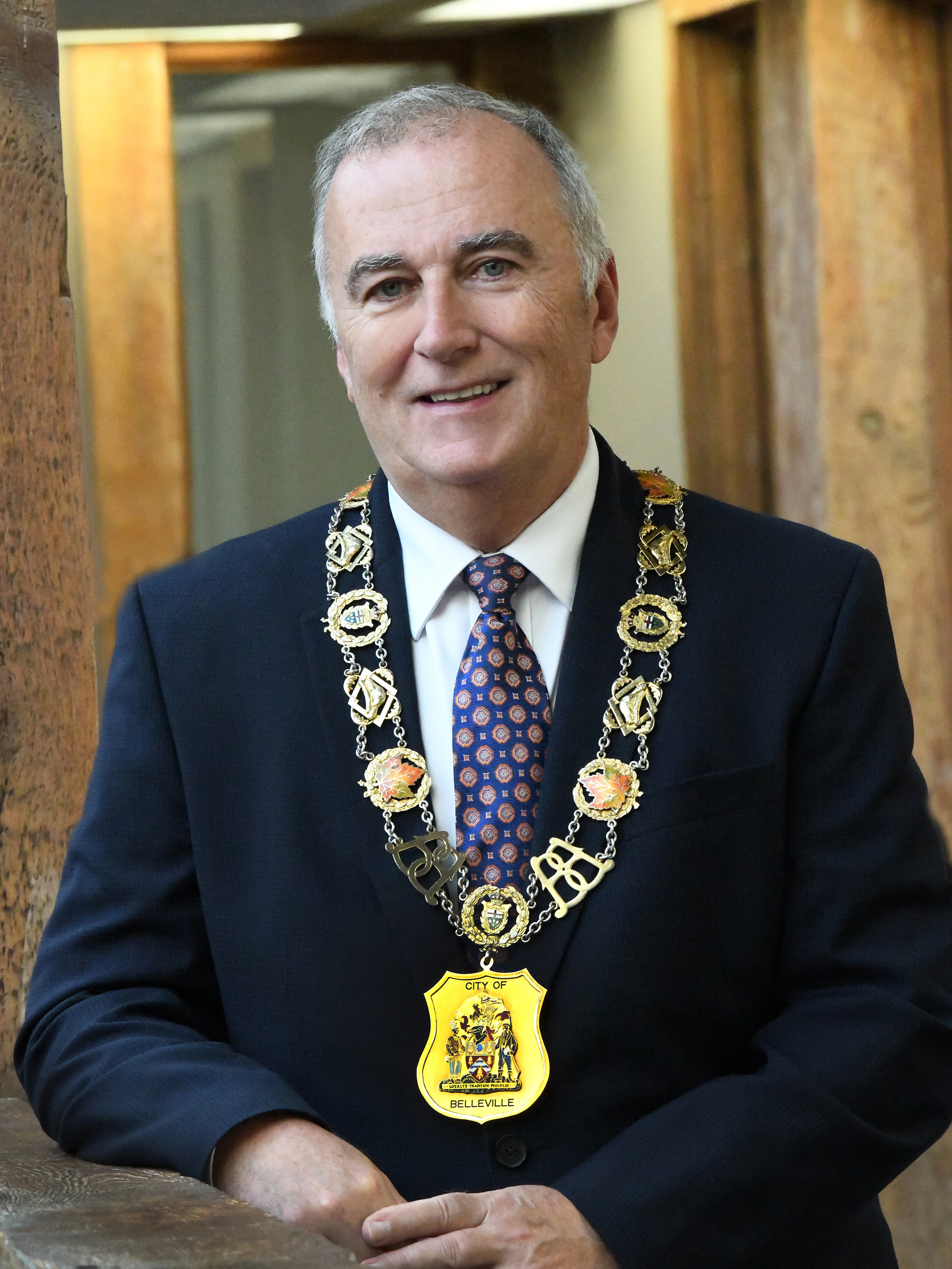
- Ellis in 2023

Member of Parliament for Bay of Quinte
- In office October 19, 2015 – September 20, 2021
- Preceded by: Daryl Kramp (Prince Edward—Hastings)
- Succeeded by: Ryan Williams

Mayor of Belleville
- In office November 15, 2022 – November 15, 2026
- Preceded by: Mitch Panciuk
- Succeeded by: Paul Fleming
- In office December 1, 2006 – December 1, 2014
- Preceded by: Mary-Anne Sills
- Succeeded by: Taso Christopher

Chairman of the Standing Committee on Veterans Affairs
- In office February 16, 2016 – December 12, 2019
- Minister: Seamus O'Regan; Kent Hehr
- Preceded by: Royal Galipeau
- Succeeded by: Bryan May

Personal details
- Born: 1961 or 1962 (age 64–65)
- Party: Liberal
- Education: Carleton University
- Profession: businessman, politician

Neil R. Ellis (born 1962) is a Canadian politician, who previously served as the mayor of Belleville, Ontario from 2006 to 2014 and again from 2022 to 2026. He is a former Liberal Member of Parliament, who was elected to represent the riding of Bay of Quinte in the House of Commons of Canada in the 2015 federal election. In the 2019 federal election, Ellis was reelected as the Member of Parliament for the Bay of Quinte. He was defeated in the 2021 federal election, returned as mayor of Belleville in 2022, and served until his defeat in the 2026 municipal election.

== Background ==
Ellis holds a bachelor's degree in law and psychology from Carleton University in Ottawa. In 1984, he became the proprietor of Doug's Bicycle, a bicycle store in Belleville which his brother had operated for five years. Ellis relinquished control of the store in 2012 after twenty-eight years of ownership.

== Political career ==
=== Mayor of Belleville ===
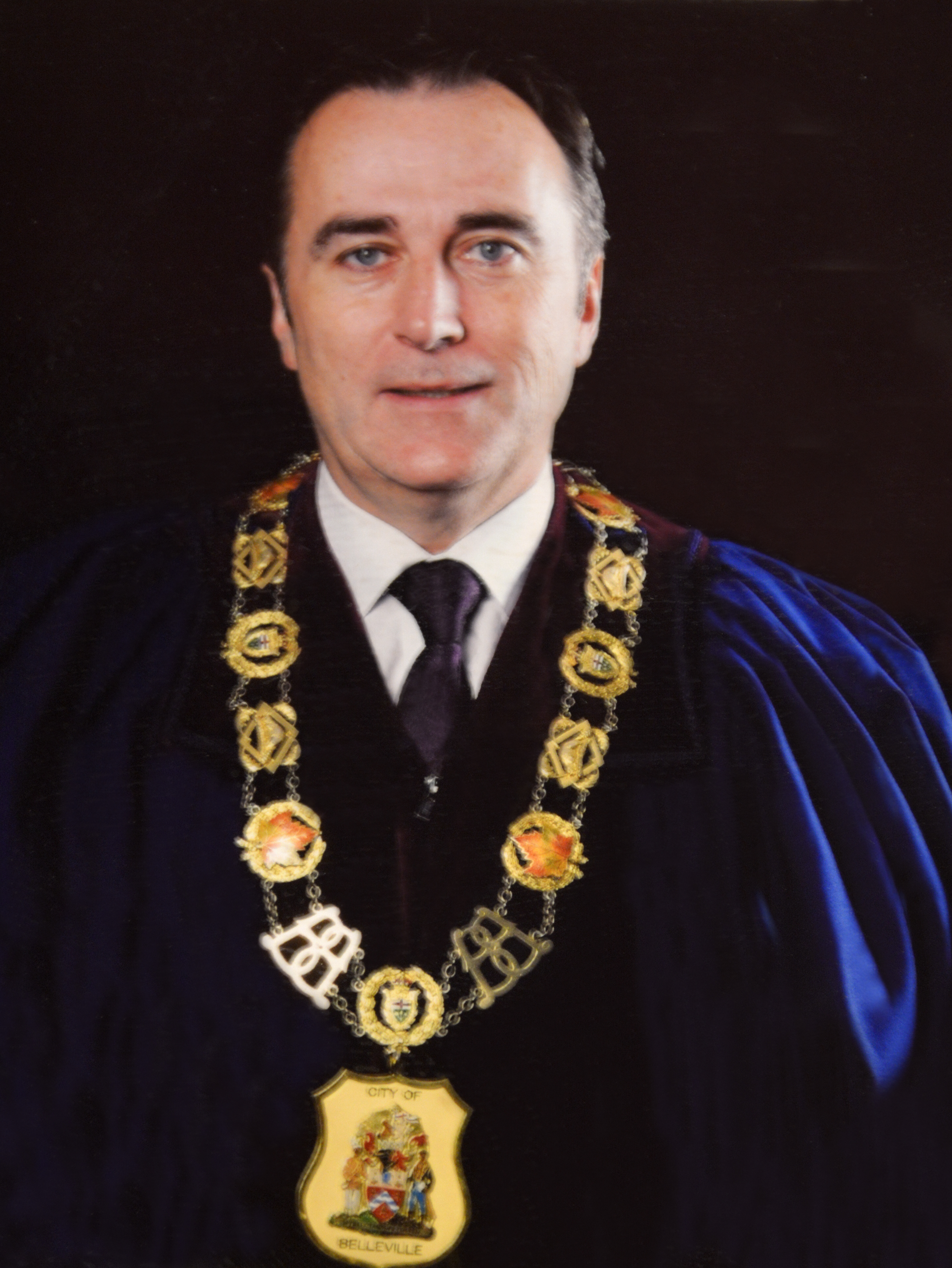
Mayoral portrait of Ellis, 2006

During the 2003 municipal elections in Ontario Ellis ran against Belleville's incumbent mayor Mary-Ann Sills, losing by only 202 votes. Nevertheless, Ellis would run again in 2006, defeating Mary-Ann Sills to become mayor of Belleville. He would serve two terms as mayor, being reelected in 2006, and leaving office in 2014. As mayor, Ellis guided city council through the Build Belleville initiative, which involved pursuing twenty-two infrastructure projects worth $91 million.

He was elected again in 2022, defeating incumbent mayor Mitch Panciuk. During his second tenure, Ellis gained national attention in February 2024 after declaring a municipal state of emergency over Belleville's addiction, mental health, and homelessness crisis following a spike in drug related overdoses. Working alongside city council, he oversaw an expansion of the city's primary care recruitment program, adding nurse practitioners and specialists to bring in over 40 healthcare providers. Additionally, he helped lead the expansion of the Northeast Industrial Park. Ellis ran for reelection in October 2026, but was defeated by newcomer Paul Fleming by 741 votes.

=== Member of Parliament ===
In 2015, Ellis became the Liberal nominee in the newly created Bay of Quinte riding, and won the subsequent election. He would go on to win reelection in 2019. From 2015 to 2019, Ellis served as the chairman of the House of Commons Standing Committee on Veterans Affairs, until being appointed as the Parliamentary Secretary to the Minister of Agriculture and Agri-Food in December 2019.

== Electoral record ==
=== Federal ===
2021 Canadian federal election: Bay of Quinte
Party	Candidate	Votes	%	±%	Expenditures
Conservative	Ryan Williams	25,479	41.3	+4.5	$93,825.48
Liberal	Neil Ellis	22,542	36.5	-2.6	$99,915.72
New Democratic	Stephanie Bell	9,284	15.0	-1.0	$10,138.56
People's	Janine LeClerc	3,045	4.9	+2.9	$4,474.11
Green	Erica Charlton	1,350	2.2	-3.9	$6,273.82
Total valid votes		61,700			
Total rejected ballots		405			
Turnout		62,105	64.95		
Eligible voters		95,615			
Conservative gain from Liberal		Swing		+5.6	
Source: Elections Canada

2019 Canadian federal election: Bay of Quinte
Party	Candidate	Votes	%	±%	Expenditures
Liberal	Neil Ellis	24,099	39.16	-11.58	$96,721.36
Conservative	Tim Durkin	22,650	36.80	+2.53	$55,922.84
New Democratic	Stephanie Bell	9,851	16.01	+3.87	none listed
Green	Danny Celovsky	3,740	6.08	+3.86	$592.37
People's	Paul Bordonaro	1,207	1.96		none listed
Total valid votes/expense limit		61,547	99.25		
Total rejected ballots		464	0.75	+0.38	
Turnout		62,011	65.83	-2.30	
Eligible voters		94,197			
Liberal hold		Swing		-7.05	
Source: Elections Canada

2015 Canadian federal election: Bay of Quinte
Party	Candidate	Votes	%	±%	Expenditures
Liberal	Neil Ellis	29,281	50.74	+29.86	$118,473.86
Conservative	Jodie Jenkins	19,781	34.27	−17.53	$109,092.53
New Democratic	Terry Cassidy	7,001	12.13	−10.88	$21,205.50
Green	Rachel Nelems	1,278	2.21	−1.56	–
Independent	Trueman Tuck	372	0.64	–	$4,425.20
Total valid votes/expense limit		57,713	99.64		$221,051.99
Total rejected ballots		211	0.36	–	
Turnout		57,924	68.13	–	
Eligible voters		85,021			
Liberal notional gain from Conservative		Swing		+23.69	
Source: Elections Canada

=== Municipal ===
2026 Belleville Mayoral Election

2026 Belleville mayoral election
Mayoral Candidate	Vote	%
Paul Fleming	8,233	49.2
Neil Ellis	7,492	44.7
Kyle Woolven	597	3.6
Don Metzger	428	2.6

2022 Belleville Mayoral Election

2022 Belleville mayoral election
Mayoral Candidate	Vote	%
Neil Ellis	9,194	59.3
Mitch Panciuk	5,654	36.4
Kyle Thompson	668	4.3

2010 Belleville Mayoral Election

2010 Belleville mayoral election
Mayoral Candidate	Vote	%
Neil Ellis	10,081	75.09
Mitch Panciuk	2,825	21.17
Lonnie D. Herrington	350	2.62
Graham K. Longhurst	149	1.12

==== 2006 Belleville Mayoral Election ====
2006 Belleville mayoral election
Candidate	Vote	%
Neil Ellis	10,427	61.8
Mary-Anne Sills	3,957	23.5
Doug Rollins	2,483	14.7

==== 2003 Belleville Mayoral Election ====
2003 Belleville mayoral election
Candidate	Vote	%
Mary-Anne Sills	5,945	39.7
Neil Ellis	5,707	38.1
Doug Parker	3,256	21.7
Trueman Tuck	57	0.5
