= Ryan Williams (Canadian politician) =

Canadian politician (born 1979)

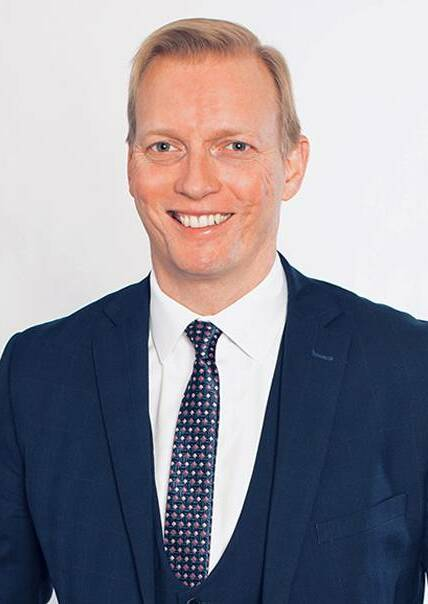

Member of Parliament for Bay of Quinte
- In office September 20, 2021 – April 28, 2025
- Preceded by: Neil Ellis
- Succeeded by: Chris Malette

Belleville City Councillor
- In office December 1, 2018 – March 31, 2021
- Constituency: Ward 1

Shadow cabinet posts
- 2021–2022: Associate Shadow Minister for Industry, Science, and Innovation
- 2022-2024: Shadow Minister for Pan Canadian Trade and Competition
- 2024-2025: Shadow Minister for International Trade and Competition

Personal details
- Born: Ryan Richard Williams; January 23, 1979 (age 47) Belleville, Ontario, Canada
- Party: Conservative (since 2021)
- Spouse: Allyson Williams (m. 2009)
- Relations: John Williams (father)
- Children: 3
- Occupation: Politician

Ryan Richard Williams (born January 23, 1979) is a Canadian politician who was elected to represent the riding of Bay of Quinte in the House of Commons in the 2021 federal election. A member of the Conservative Party, he was unseated in the 2025 federal election.

== Biography ==
Williams is the President of Williams Hotels, which owns and operates 2 hotels, and has operated since 1979 and has owned and operated Marriott, Best Western, Holiday Inn, and Ramada hotels. Ryan has been appointed Fellow at the Balsillie School of International Affairs. Prior to being elected to the House of Commons. Ryan is currently not an MP, he was defeated in the last election. Ryan was President of Bay of Quinte Tourism for 10 years, and founded Bay of Quinte Living and QuinteVation. Ryan has been a director of the Belleville Chamber of Commerce for 6 years. Ryan topped the polls in 2018 elected to Belleville City Council, but did not complete his term as he ran in the federal election. Ryan ran and won the 2021 election and served as the Member of Parliament for Bay of Quinte from 2021-2025. He is married to Allyson Williams, and has three children. Ryan is the son of the late John Williams, who served as Mayor of Quinte West from 2008–2016.

== Shadow Cabinet post ==
Williams was the Shadow Critic for International Trade and Competition, as well as the Shadow Critic from Competition and Pan-Canadian Trade, and was the Associate Shadow Critic for Industry and Innovation.

== Private Members Bill ==
Ryan's Private Members Bill - C-365 - An Act respecting the implementation of a consumer-led banking system for Canadians, to implement Open banking in Canada passed 2nd reading on March 20, 2024.

== Election results ==
2025 Canadian federal election: Bay of Quinte
Party	Candidate	Votes	%	±%
Liberal	Chris Malette	32,846	50.39	+13.37
Conservative	Ryan Williams	29,130	44.69	+4.10
New Democratic	Kate Crothers	2,373	3.64	−11.61
Green	Erica Charlton	833	1.28	−0.93
Total valid votes		65,182	99.45	
Total rejected ballots		359	0.55	-0.12
Turnout		65,541	69.69	+5.13
Eligible voters		94,044		
Liberal notional gain from Conservative		Swing		+4.63
Source: Elections Canada

2021 Canadian federal election: Bay of Quinte
Party	Candidate	Votes	%	±%
Conservative	Ryan Williams	25,479	41.3	+4.5
Liberal	Neil Ellis	22,542	36.5	-2.6
New Democratic	Stephanie Bell	9,284	15.0	-1.0
People's	Janine LeClerc	3,045	4.9	+2.9
Green	Erica Charlton	1,350	2.2	-3.9
Total valid votes		61,700		
Total rejected ballots		405		
Turnout		62,105	64.95	
Eligible voters		95,615		
Conservative gain from Liberal		Swing		+5.6
Source: Elections Canada
