= Gordie Hogg =

Canadian politician (born 1946)

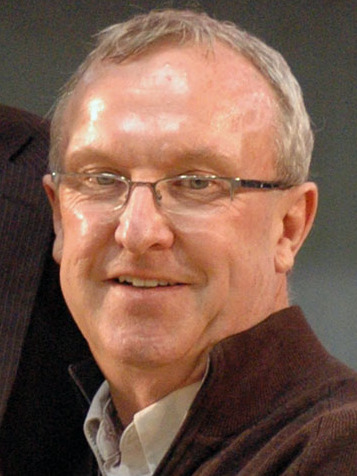
- Hogg in 2008

Chair of the Federal Liberal Pacific Caucus
- In office March 21, 2018 – September 11, 2019
- Preceded by: Randeep Sarai
- Succeeded by: Terry Beech

Member of Parliament for South Surrey—White Rock
- In office December 11, 2017 – September 11, 2019
- Preceded by: Dianne Watts
- Succeeded by: Kerry-Lynne Findlay

Minister of State for Mining
- In office June 23, 2008 – June 10, 2009
- Premier: Gordon Campbell
- Preceded by: Kevin Krueger
- Succeeded by: Randy Hawes

Minister of State for ActNow BC
- In office August 15, 2006 – June 23, 2008
- Premier: Gordon Campbell
- Preceded by: Position established
- Succeeded by: Mary McNeil

Minister of Children and Family Development
- In office June 5, 2001 – January 23, 2004
- Premier: Gordon Campbell
- Preceded by: Edward John (Minister of Children and Families)
- Succeeded by: Christy Clark

Member of the British Columbia Legislative Assembly for Surrey-White Rock
- In office September 15, 1997 – May 9, 2017
- Preceded by: Wilf Hurd
- Succeeded by: Tracy Redies

8th Mayor of White Rock
- In office 1984–1993
- Preceded by: Tom Kirstein
- Succeeded by: Hardy Staub

Personal details
- Born: August 24, 1946 (age 80) Victoria, British Columbia, Canada
- Party: Liberal Party of Canada; Surrey First
- Other political affiliations: British Columbia Liberal Party
- Spouse: LaVerne Hogg
- Education: University of British Columbia; Antioch College; Simon Fraser University
- Occupation: Politician

Gordon "Gordie" Hogg (born August 24, 1946) is a Canadian politician who served as the member of Parliament (MP) for South Surrey—White Rock in the House of Commons of Canada from 2017 to 2019, as a member of the Liberal Party of Canada. He previously represented Surrey-White Rock in the Legislative Assembly of British Columbia from 1997 to 2017 as part of the British Columbia Liberal Party caucus, serving in several cabinet positions under Premier Gordon Campbell during that time, and was the mayor of White Rock, British Columbia, from 1984 to 1993.

== Background ==
Hogg was born in Victoria to Kathleen and Dr. Allan Hogg, a prominent physician in White Rock, who was instrumental in establishing the first White Rock Hospital in 1954, and is the oldest of four children. Dr. Hogg went on to deliver more than 1,100 children during his time in the community, with a wing of the Peace Arch Hospital named in his honour.

While attending the University of British Columbia (UBC), Hogg was a two-sport athlete, playing football and basketball, including winning the National Junior Men’s Basketball Championship in 1967. He graduated from UBC with a bachelor of arts in sociology and psychology, and from Antioch College with a master's degree in psychology.

Hogg began coaching baseball in the community in his teens. He was asked to go before White Rock City Council to request support for the team to go to Edmonton for the championships. Upon returning home, Hogg said that he thought the whole thing had been pointless, to which his mother replied “Son, I hoped I’d always raised you to be the kind of person that if you didn’t like something, you wouldn’t complain about it, but you’d get involved and try and make a difference.” Hogg has said that this is what led him to run for politics, first at the municipal level, then provincially and federally.

He had worked for the Salvation Army's House of Concord as a probation officer, and the British Columbia corrections service as a regional director. In 1996, while working as director of the Burnaby Youth Custody Centre, he established Night Hoops, a nighttime basketball program for at-risk youth to help reduce recidivism and other related issues.

Hogg and his wife LaVerne have one son, Blair. They were also foster parents and billet parents for the Surrey Eagles hockey team. He had served on the board of organizations such as Peace Arch Hospital and the Peace Arch Community Health Council.

== Political career ==
=== Municipal ===
Hogg was elected in 1974 as alderman for the City of White Rock, serving in that role from 1975 to 1983. He was then elected the city's mayor in 1984, serving until 1993. During his tenure as mayor, Hogg oversaw the development of the White Rock Promenade along the waterfront, as well as the repurposing of the old train station into the White Rock Museum and Archives.

=== Provincial ===
With incumbent Surrey-White Rock member of the Legislative Assembly (MLA) Wilf Hurd resigning to run in the 1997 federal election, Hogg was approached by the British Columbia Liberal Party to contest the riding's by-election. He was elected to the British Columbia Legislative Assembly at the 1997 by-election, and held the seat for twenty years. While the Liberals were in opposition, Hogg served as critic for education and human resources. He shared an apartment in Victoria with Geoff Plant and party leader Gordon Campbell during that time.

When the Liberals formed government following the 2001 provincial election, Hogg was appointed Minister of Children and Family Development by Premier Campbell. He was forced to resign from that role in January 2004 during an investigation into the ministry's spending; an audit by PricewaterhouseCoopers concluded there was no evidence of fraud or misappropriation of the ministry's funds.

He re-entered the cabinet in August 2006 to serve as Minister of State for ActNow BC, a provincial initiative to promote healthy living. He then served as Minister of State for Mining from June 2008 until being replaced by Randy Hawes in June 2009. He was subsequently named Parliamentary Secretary for Social Entrepreneurship.

Hogg was chosen as government caucus chair by fellow Liberal MLAs in July 2011, replacing the outgoing Ron Cantelon. He was also named Parliamentary Secretary for Non-Profit Partnerships by Premier Christy Clark in September 2011, before being reassigned to the role of Parliamentary Secretary for Youth Sport in September 2015.

Hogg announced in October 2016 that he would not seek re-election in 2017. The BC Liberals chose Tracy Redies, former CEO of Coast Capital Savings, as the next candidate for the riding.

=== Federal ===
Hogg first ran for federal office under the federal Liberal banner in the riding of Surrey—White Rock—South Langley in 1993, placing second behind Reform candidate Val Meredith.

In 2017, Hogg was selected as the Liberal candidate for the South Surrey—White Rock by-election, resulting from the resignation of incumbent Conservative MP Dianne Watts. Hogg defeated former cabinet minister and former MP from neighbouring Delta—Richmond East, Conservative candidate Kerry-Lynne Findlay, in the by-election. This marked the first time a Liberal had won the riding since the 1940s, when it included all of Surrey, and most of New Westminster. On March 21, 2018, Hogg was elected as chair of the Federal Liberal Pacific Caucus. He sat on the House of Commons Standing Committee on Human Resources, Skills and Social Development and the Status of Persons with Disabilities, and the Standing Committee on Canadian Heritage.

Hogg lost the seat to Findlay in the 2019 federal election; he was defeated by Findlay again in 2021.

== Recent activities ==
At the age of 70, while working as an MLA, Hogg completed an interdisciplinary doctorate that focused on public policy from Simon Fraser University (SFU). He was subsequently named an adjunct professor in criminology at SFU in 2017.

He ran for mayor of Surrey in the 2022 municipal election as part of the Surrey First slate, finishing third behind winner Brenda Locke and incumbent Doug McCallum.

== Electoral record ==
=== Federal ===
2021 Canadian federal election: South Surrey—White Rock
| Party | Candidate | Votes | % | ±% | Expenditures |
|---|---|---|---|---|---|
| Conservative | Kerry-Lynne Findlay | 24,158 | 42.45 | +0.56 | $116,744.84 |
| Liberal | Gordie Hogg | 22,166 | 38.95 | +1.57 | $106,156.01 |
| New Democratic | June Liu | 8,395 | 14.75 | +3.18 | $5,597.59 |
| People's | Gary Jensen | 2,186 | 3.84 | +2.37 | $2,520.21 |
| Total valid votes/expense limit | | 56,905 | 99.41 | – | $116,892.25 |
| Total rejected ballots | | 340 | 0.59 | +0.04 | |
| Turnout | | 57,245 | 64.84 | –4.08 | |
| Eligible voters | | 88,281 | | | |
| Conservative hold | | Swing | | –0.51 | |
Source: Elections Canada

2019 Canadian federal election: South Surrey—White Rock
| Party | Candidate | Votes | % | ±% | Expenditures |
|---|---|---|---|---|---|
| Conservative | Kerry-Lynne Findlay | 24,310 | 41.89 | –0.39 | $107,342.28 |
| Liberal | Gordie Hogg | 21,692 | 37.38 | –9.99 | $86,461.45 |
| New Democratic | Stephen Crozier | 6,716 | 11.57 | +6.70 | $16,252.90 |
| Green | Beverly Pixie Hobby | 4,458 | 7.68 | +3.57 | $6,434.86 |
| People's | Joel Poulin | 852 | 1.47 | – | $5,942.36 |
| Total valid votes/expense limit | | 58,028 | 99.44 | – | $110,594.25 |
| Total rejected ballots | | 326 | 0.56 | +0.39 | |
| Turnout | | 58,354 | 68.92 | +30.78 | |
| Eligible voters | | 84,664 | | | |
| Conservative gain from Liberal | | Swing | | – | |
Source: Elections Canada

Canadian federal by-election, December 11, 2017: South Surrey—White Rock Resignation of Dianne Watts
| Party | Candidate | Votes | % | ±% | Expenditures |
|---|---|---|---|---|---|
| Liberal | Gordie Hogg | 14,369 | 47.37 | +5.89 | $88,736.12 |
| Conservative | Kerry-Lynne Findlay | 12,824 | 42.28 | –1.75 | $87,702.59 |
| New Democratic | Jonathan Silveira | 1,478 | 4.87 | –5.54 | $14,166.92 |
| Green | Larry Colero | 1,247 | 4.11 | +0.69 | $2,586.08 |
| Christian Heritage | Rod Taylor | 238 | 0.78 | – | $9,833.08 |
| Libertarian | Donald Wilson | 89 | 0.29 | –0.17 | none listed |
| Progressive Canadian | Michael Huenefeld | 86 | 0.28 | +0.09 | $508.36 |
| Total valid votes/expense limit | | 30,331 | 99.83 | – | $102,950.75 |
| Total rejected ballots | | 52 | 0.17 | –0.21 | |
| Turnout | | 30,383 | 38.14 | –35.85 | |
| Eligible voters | | 79,653 | | | |
| Liberal gain from Conservative | | Swing | | +3.82 | |
Source: Elections Canada

1993 Canadian federal election: Surrey—White Rock—South Langley
| Party | Candidate | Votes | % | ±% |
|---|---|---|---|---|
| Reform | Val Meredith | 32,198 | 44.11 | +37.80 |
| Liberal | Gordie Hogg | 24,683 | 33.82 | +10.33 |
| Progressive Conservative | Norm Blain | 8,885 | 12.17 | –31.31 |
| New Democratic | Mota Singh Jheeta | 3,029 | 4.15 | –20.18 |
| National | Carolyn Dorothy Goertzen | 2,387 | 3.27 | – |
| Christian Heritage | Heather Stilwell | 877 | 1.20 | –0.20 |
| Green | Steve Chitty | 464 | 0.64 | +0.20 |
| Natural Law | Derek Nadeau | 251 | 0.34 | – |
| Marxist–Leninist | Charles Boylan | 67 | 0.09 | – |
| Independent | Rhonda Thiessen | 59 | 0.08 | – |
| Canada Party | Farlie Paynter | 56 | 0.08 | – |
| Commonwealth of Canada | Giancarlo Dalla Valle | 35 | 0.05 | – |
| Total valid votes | | 72,991 | 99.54 | |
| Total rejected ballots | | 334 | 0.46 | – |
| Turnout | | 73,325 | 71.77 | – |
| Eligible voters | | 102,164 | | |
| Reform gain from Progressive Conservative | | Swing | | +34.55 |
Source: Elections Canada

=== Provincial ===
2013 British Columbia general election: Surrey-White Rock
| Party | Candidate | Votes | % |
|---|---|---|---|
| Liberal | Gordon Hogg | 15092 | 58.09 |
| New Democratic | Susan Keeping | 7180 | 27.63 |
| Green | Don Pitcairn | 2304 | 8.87 |
| Conservative | Elizabeth Morales Pagtakhan | 1301 | 5.01 |
| British Columbia Party | Jim Laurence | 105 | 0.40 |
| Total valid votes | | 25982 | 100.00 |
| Total rejected ballots | | 74 | 0.28 |
| Turnout | | 26056 | 64.73 |
Source: Elections BC

2009 British Columbia general election: Surrey-White Rock
| Party | Candidate | Votes | % | ±% |
|---|---|---|---|---|
| Liberal | Gordon Hogg | 15,121 | 62.05 | +4.19 |
| New Democratic | Drina Allen | 6,668 | 27.36 | +0.96 |
| Green | Don Pitcairn | 2,118 | 8.69 | −2.03 |
| Reform | David Charles Hawkins | 464 | 1.90 | |
| Total | | 24,371 | 100.00 | |
Source:"2009 Official Election Results for Surrey-White Rock". Elections BC. June 5, 2009.

2005 British Columbia general election: Surrey-White Rock
| Party | Candidate | Votes | % | ±% |
|---|---|---|---|---|
| Liberal | Gordon Hogg | 16,462 | 57.86 | −10.84 |
| New Democratic | Moh Chelali | 7,511 | 26.40 | +13.24 |
| Green | Ashley Brie Hughes | 3,051 | 10.72 | −2.44 |
| Conservative | David James Evans | 1,340 | 4.71 | |
| Democratic Reform | Ronald Edward Dunsford | 87 | 0.31 | |
| Total | | 28,451 | 100.00 | |

B.C. General Election 2001: Surrey-White Rock
| Party | Candidate | Votes | % | ± | Expenditures |
|---|---|---|---|---|---|
| Liberal | Gordon J. Hogg | 18,678 | 68.70 | +10.66 | $46,685 |
| Green | Ruth Christine | 3,577 | 13.16 | +10.98 | $2,700 |
| NDP | Matt Todd | 3,415 | 12.56 | -13.87 | $5,509 |
| Unity | Garry Sahl | 983 | 3.62 | - | |
| Marijuana | David Bourgeois | 536 | 1.96 | - | $394 |
| Total valid votes | | 27,189 | 100.00 | | |
| Total rejected ballots | | 91 | 0.33 | | |
| Turnout | | 27,280 | 77.64 | | |
