= LaSalle College Vancouver =

Private arts school in Vancouver, British Columbia

- Type: Private training institution
- Established: 1998
- President: Jason Dewling
- Location: 2808 Bradfield Court, Vancouver, British Columbia, V5M 4J1, Canada
- Campus: Urban
- Nickname: LCV

LaSalle College Vancouver (formerly the Art Institute of Vancouver) is a Canadian-owned private post-secondary arts and design school located in Vancouver, British Columbia. The school provides education in fashion, culinary, interior design, graphic design, audio & film, and game design & VFX.

LaSalle College Vancouver is part of the LCI Education network of schools which encompasses 23 campuses around the world. These specialize mainly in design education and include LaSalle College Montreal, LCI Barcelona in Spain, LCI Melbourne in Australia, and LCI Bogota in Colombia, among others.

The school is a registered post-secondary institution and is designated by the Private Training Institutions Branch of the Ministry of Advanced Education of British Columbia.

== Programs ==
LaSalle College Vancouver (LCV) offers programs in the following areas:

- Game Design & VFX
- Associate of Arts
- Graphic Design
- Culinary
- Interior Design
- Fashion
- Audio & Film
- E-Learning

== Art Institute of Vancouver ==
The Art Institute of Vancouver
- Type: Private, degree-granting
- Established: 1979
- Parent institution: LCI Education
- President: Jason Dewling
- Students: 600+ Undergraduate
- Location: Vancouver, BC, Canada; 49.2601°N 123.0450°W
- Website: www.artinstitutevancouver.com

In 2017, The Art Institute of Vancouver was acquired by LCI Education Network and the 80,000 square foot building has been rebranded to reflect its new association as LaSalle College Vancouver. The original main location of The Art Institute of Vancouver used to be in Burnaby, which was founded in 1979 and originally called the Center for Digital Imaging and Sound (CDIS). The International Culinary School at The Art Institute of Vancouver was founded in 1982 and originally called Dubrulle International Culinary & Hotel Institute of Canada. Since 2010 all the programs have now moved to its present location at the new Renfrew Campus.

The Art Institute of Vancouver is registered with and accredited by the Private Training Institutions Branch

The Art Institute of Vancouver has been part of the LCI Education Network since February 1, 2017, who acquired it from Education Management Corporation.

The Art Institute of Vancouver, now LaSalle College Vancouver, offers courses in Visual Effects, Animation, Recording Arts, Baking & Pastry Arts, Culinary Arts, Music Production, Event Management, Digital Film & Video, Graphic Design, Interior Design, Fashion Design, Game Art & Design, Game Programming, and other art disciplines. Since 2009 The Art Institute of Vancouver offers a bachelor's degree in Graphic Design.

== Game Art & Design program ==
The Calgary Sun reported that in 2005 over 200 students were enrolled in The Art Institute of Vancouver's 18-month game art and design diploma program. And in 2006 The Art Institute of Vancouver partnered with the International Game Developers Association and video game company Electronic Arts (EA) to host the ARTmageddon game industry festival. The school's teachers and students have been interviewed about game design and education by publications such as the Vancouver Courier and Gamasutra.

== Notable alumni ==
- Nathan Fong (1959–2020), Canadian chef
- Reann Gasper, former MLA for Abbotsford-Mission
