= 2017 South Surrey—White Rock federal by-election =

- December 11, 2017

Seat of South Surrey—White Rock
- Turnout: 38.13% (▼36.60pp)
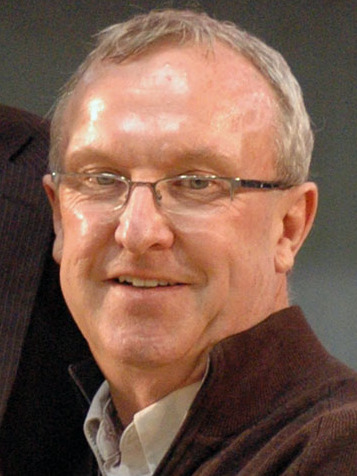

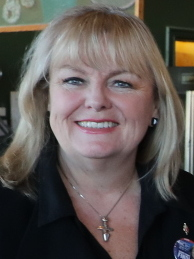
	First party	Second party
Candidate	Gordie Hogg	Kerry-Lynne Findlay
Party	Liberal	Conservative
Popular vote	14,369	12,752
Percentage	47.49%	42.14%
Swing	▲6.00pp	▼1.89pp
MP before election
Dianne Watts
Conservative
Elected MP
Gordie Hogg
Liberal

A by-election was held in the federal riding of South Surrey—White Rock in British Columbia on December 11, 2017 following the resignation of Conservative MP Dianne Watts. The seat was gained for the Liberals by Gordie Hogg.

The by-election result was rare as it saw a seat gain for a governing party.

The by election was held on the same day as 3 others across Canada; Battlefords—Lloydminster in Alberta, Bonavista—Burin—Trinity in Newfoundland and Labrador and Scarborough—Agincourt in Ontario.

== Background ==
=== Constituency ===
The riding is anchored by the cities of Surrey and White Rock.

=== Representation ===
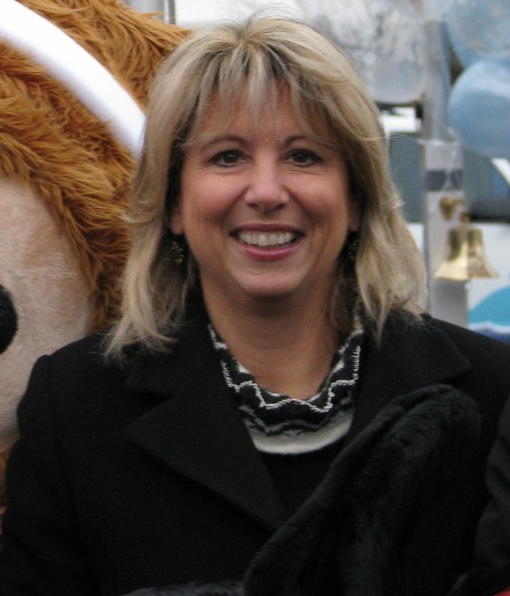
Dianne Watts was elected MP in 2015.

The riding of South Surrey—White Rock was newly created for the 2015 election. A notionally safe seat for the Conservatives, the result was tighter than expected. Conservative candidate Dianne Watts won over the Liberal candidate with a majority of under 2000 votes. The seat was vacated on September 30, 2017, after Watts announced on September 24, 2017, that she would be resigning her seat to enter provincial politics and seek the leadership of the British Columbia Liberal Party.

== Campaign ==
Former federal cabinet minister and Delta—Richmond East MP Kerry-Lynne Findlay defeated Fraser Institute policy analyst and former BC Liberal staffer David Hunt and police officer Bryan Tepper for the Conservative Party nomination.

Former White Rock Mayor and Surrey-White Rock MLA Gordie Hogg was acclaimed as the Liberal Party candidate. A rumoured candidate for the nomination was Judith Higginbotham, a former Surrey city councillor and the riding's Liberal candidate in the 2015 federal election.

Mortgage broker Jonathan Silveira was acclaimed the NDP candidate on November 19.

The Speaker's warrant regarding the vacancy was received on October 3, 2017; under the Parliament of Canada Act the writ for a by-election had to be dropped no later than April 1, 2018, 180 days after the Chief Electoral Officer was officially notified of the vacancy via a warrant issued by the Speaker.

== Results ==
Canadian federal by-election, December 11, 2017: South Surrey—White Rock Resignation of Dianne Watts
Party	Candidate	Votes	%	±%	Expenditures
Liberal	Gordie Hogg	14,369	47.37	+5.89	$88,736.12
Conservative	Kerry-Lynne Findlay	12,824	42.28	–1.75	$87,702.59
New Democratic	Jonathan Silveira	1,478	4.87	–5.54	$14,166.92
Green	Larry Colero	1,247	4.11	+0.69	$2,586.08
Christian Heritage	Rod Taylor	238	0.78	–	$9,833.08
Libertarian	Donald Wilson	89	0.29	–0.17	none listed
Progressive Canadian	Michael Huenefeld	86	0.28	+0.09	$508.36
Total valid votes/expense limit		30,331	99.83	–	$102,950.75
Total rejected ballots		52	0.17	–0.21	
Turnout		30,383	38.14	–35.85	
Eligible voters		79,653			
Liberal gain from Conservative		Swing		+3.82	
Source: Elections Canada

== 2015 results ==
2015 Canadian federal election: South Surrey—White Rock
Party	Candidate	Votes	%	±%	Expenditures
Conservative	Dianne Watts	24,934	44.03	-8.85	$161,579.40
Liberal	Judith Higginbotham	23,495	41.49	+22.40	$40,658.82
New Democratic	Pixie Hobby	5,895	10.41	-8.78	$38,925.44
Green	Larry Colero	1,938	3.42	-2.44	$12.62
Libertarian	Bonnie Hu	261	0.46	–	–
Progressive Canadian	Brian Marlatt	108	0.19	–	$400.00
Total valid votes/Expense limit		56,631	100.00		$208,357.11
Total rejected ballots		219	0.39	–	
Turnout		56,850	74.73	–	
Eligible voters		76,078			
Conservative hold		Swing		-15.63	
Source: Elections Canada

== See also ==
- By-elections to the 42nd Canadian Parliament
