= Pam Alexis =

Canadian politician

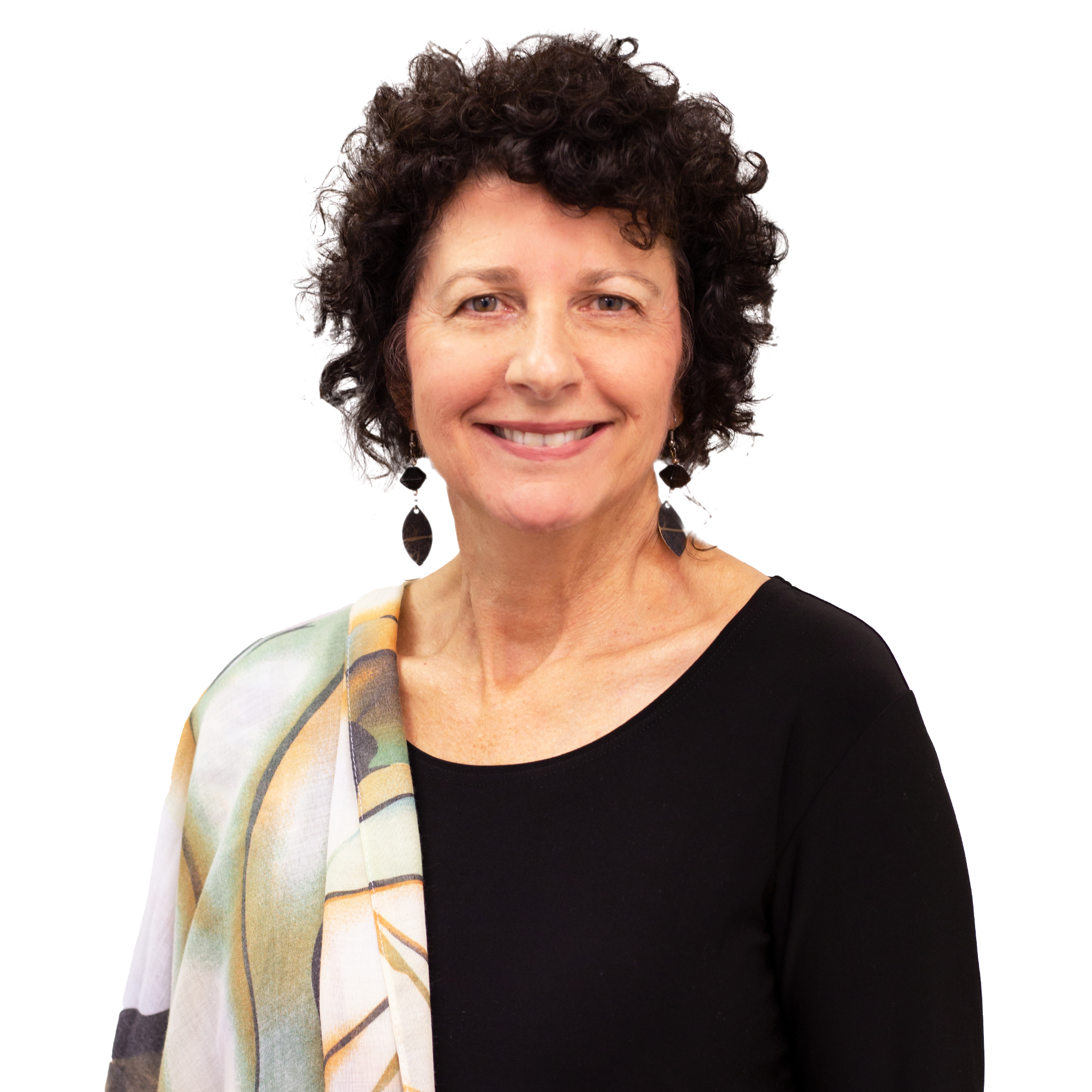
- Alexis in 2020

Minister of Agriculture and Food of British Columbia
- In office December 7, 2022 – November 18, 2024
- Premier: David Eby
- Preceded by: Lana Popham
- Succeeded by: Lana Popham

Member of the British Columbia Legislative Assembly for Abbotsford-Mission
- In office October 24, 2020 – September 21, 2024
- Preceded by: Simon Gibson
- Succeeded by: Reann Gasper

Mayor of Mission
- In office November 1, 2018 – November 12, 2020
- Preceded by: Randy Hawes
- Succeeded by: Mark Davies (acting)

Personal details
- Born: Victoria, British Columbia
- Party: New Democratic
- Spouse: Alan Fry
- Education: University of Victoria

Pam Alexis is a Canadian politician who was elected to the Legislative Assembly of British Columbia in the 2020 British Columbia general election. She represented the electoral district of Abbotsford-Mission as a member of the British Columbia New Democratic Party (BC NDP). She served as the Minister of Agriculture and Food of British Columbia in the cabinet of David Eby.

== Biography ==
Born and raised in Victoria, British Columbia, Alexis attended University of Victoria, receiving a bachelor of fine arts degree in 1980 and a teaching certificate in 1982. She lived in Japan with her family from 1985 to 1990 before moving to Dallas, Texas, teaching English as a second or foreign language during that time. They returned to Canada in 1994, settling in the District of Mission in the Fraser Valley. She worked at the Clarke Theatre in Mission from 1996 to 2001, before founding an event management company.

Prior to politics, she served on several boards and non-profit organizations, including the Mission Chamber of Commerce (vice-president), the Rotary Club of Mission Midday, and the Sunshine Rotary Club, where she also served as president and earned four Paul Harris Fellowships. She was vice-president for the 2014 BC Winter Games hosted in Mission.

She was first elected as a Mission school trustee in the 2005 municipal election and was re-elected in 2008. She unsuccessfully ran for a seat on Mission District Council in 2011, before winning election to council in 2014 by taking the largest number of votes. In 2018, she won the district's mayoral race.

She ran in the 2020 provincial election as a BC NDP candidate in the riding of Abbotsford-Mission, defeating the two-term incumbent Liberal candidate Simon Gibson to become the riding's member of the Legislative Assembly (MLA). She resigned as mayor of Mission on November 12, 2020. She suffered a stroke in September 2021, but recovered with no permanent side effects and resumed her work as MLA the following month.

She was named Minister of Agriculture and Food by Premier David Eby on December 7, 2022.

In the 2024 British Columbia general election, Alexis was unseated in her bid for re-election by Reann Gasper.

Alexis was selected as the NDP candidate to stand against BC Conservative leader Kerry-Lynne Findlay in the 2026 Abbotsford-Mission provincial by-election. The by-election was cancelled by the calling of the 2026 British Columbia general election.

== Electoral record ==
2026 British Columbia general election: Abbotsford-Mission
** Preliminary results — Not yet official **
Party	Candidate	Votes	%	±%
Conservative	Darryl Kropp	11,848	56.7	
New Democratic	Pam Alexis	7,489	35.8	
CentreBC	Lakhwinder Jhaj	735	3.5	–
OneBC	Virender Dass	534	2.6	–
Libertarian	Jeff Monds	299	1.4	–
Total valid votes				
Total rejected ballots				
Turnout				
Registered voters		TBA		
Conservative hold		Swing		
Source: Elections BC

2024 British Columbia general election: Abbotsford-Mission
Party	Candidate	Votes	%	±%	Expenditures
Conservative	Reann Gasper	13,523	55.38	+49.8	$49,054.04
New Democratic	Pam Alexis	10,894	44.62	−1.8	$46,363.45
Total valid votes/expenses limit		24,417	99.60	–	$71,700.08
Total rejected ballots		98	0.40	–	
Turnout		24,515	57.42	–	
Registered voters		42,692			
Conservative notional gain from New Democratic		Swing		+25.8	
Source: Elections BC

2020 British Columbia general election: Abbotsford-Mission
Party	Candidate	Votes	%	±%	Expenditures
New Democratic	Pam Alexis	10,364	41.07	+11.90	$22,050.17
Liberal	Simon Gibson	9,620	38.12	−13.07	$38,355.28
Green	Stephen Fowler	2,667	10.57	−6.51	$1,113.00
Conservative	Trevor Hamilton	1,989	7.88	–	$1,310.44
Christian Heritage	Aeriol Alderking	595	2.36	−0.20	$1,305.19
Total valid votes		25,235	99.40	–	
Total rejected ballots		152	0.60	+0.07	
Turnout		25,387	53.45	-5.76	
Registered voters		47,500			
New Democratic gain from Liberal		Swing		+12.48	
Source: Elections BC
