= South Surrey—White Rock =

Federal electoral district in British Columbia, Canada

British Columbia electoral district
- Interactive map of riding boundaries from the 2025 federal election
- Coordinates: 49.057°N 122.786°W

Federal electoral district
- Legislature: House of Commons
MP
Ernie Klassen
Liberal
- District created: 2013
- First contested: 2015
- Last contested: 2025
- District webpage: profile, map

Demographics
- Population (2011): 94,678
- Electors (2017): 79,359
- Area (km²): 154
- Pop. density (per km²): 614.8
- Census division: Metro Vancouver
- Census subdivision(s): Surrey (part), White Rock, Semiahmoo

South Surrey—White Rock (French: Surrey-Sud—White Rock) is a federal electoral district in British Columbia that has been represented in the House of Commons of Canada since 2015. It encompass a portion of British Columbia previously included in the electoral districts of Fleetwood—Port Kells, Newton—North Delta, and South Surrey—White Rock—Cloverdale.

South Surrey—White Rock was created by the 2012 federal electoral boundaries redistribution and was legally defined in the 2013 representation order. It came into effect upon the call of the 42nd Canadian federal election, on October 19, 2015.

The 2017 by-election was won by Liberal candidate and former White Rock mayor Gordie Hogg. However, the Conservatives were quick to regain their seat with Kerry-Lynne Findlay winning the riding in the 43rd Canadian federal election in 2019.

== Demographics ==
Panethnic groups in South Surrey—White Rock (2011−2021)
Panethnic group	2021		2016		2011	
Panethnic group	Pop.	%	Pop.	%	Pop.	%
European (Note: Statistic includes all persons that did not make up part of a visible minority or an indigenous identity.)	70,055	60.08%	70,635	69.86%	73,055	79.44%
East Asian (Note: Statistic includes total responses of "Chinese", "Korean", and "Japanese" under visible minority section on census.)	21,745	18.65%	15,075	14.91%	8,665	9.42%
South Asian	14,095	12.09%	8,640	8.55%	5,495	5.98%
Southeast Asian (Note: Statistic includes total responses of "Filipino" and "Southeast Asian" under visible minority section on census.)	3,140	2.69%	1,745	1.73%	1,515	1.65%
Indigenous	2,475	2.12%	2,250	2.23%	1,555	1.69%
African	1,325	1.14%	685	0.68%	505	0.55%
Latin American	1,195	1.02%	680	0.67%	345	0.38%
Middle Eastern (Note: Statistic includes total responses of "West Asian" and "Arab" under visible minority section on census.)	980	0.84%	520	0.51%	360	0.39%
Other (Note: Statistic includes total responses of "Visible minority, n.i.e." and "Multiple visible minorities" under visible minority section on census.)	1,600	1.37%	870	0.86%	475	0.52%
Total responses	116,610	97.44%	101,105	97.17%	91,965	97.13%
Total population	119,672	100%	104,051	100%	94,678	100%
Notes: Totals greater than 100% due to multiple origin responses. Demographics based on 2012 Canadian federal electoral redistribution riding boundaries.

According to the 2011 Canadian census

Religions: 52.1% Christian, 4.3% Sikh, 1.4% Buddhist, 1.1% Muslim, 2.0% Other, 39.1% None.
Median income: $34,974 (2010)
Average income: $50,826 (2010)

== Members of Parliament ==
This riding has elected the following members of the House of Commons of Canada:

Parliament	Years	Member	Party
South Surrey—White Rock; Riding created from Fleetwood—Port Kells, Newton—North Delta and South Surrey—White Rock—Cloverdale
42nd	2015–2017	Dianne Watts	Conservative
42nd	2017–2019	Gordie Hogg	Liberal
43rd	2019–2021	Kerry-Lynne Findlay	Conservative
44th	2021–2025	Kerry-Lynne Findlay	Conservative
45th	2025–present	Ernie Klassen	Liberal

== Election results ==
Graph of election results in South Surrey—White Rock (minor parties that never got 2% of the vote or didn't run consistently are omitted)

=== 2023 representation order ===
2025 Canadian federal election
Party	Candidate	Votes	%	±%	Expenditures
Liberal	Ernie Klassen	33,094	50.50	+11.60	$103,687.08
Conservative	Kerry-Lynne Findlay	29,924	45.67	+3.23	$134,499.95
New Democratic	Jureun Park	1,634	2.49	–12.31	none listed
Green	Christine Kinnie	875	1.34	–	$4,957.34
Total valid votes/expense limit		65,527	99.44	–	$136,873.75
Total rejected ballots		368	0.56	–0.04	
Turnout		65,895	71.59	+6.75	
Eligible voters		92,041			
Liberal notional gain from Conservative		Swing		+4.19	
Source: Elections Canada

2021 federal election redistributed results
Party	Vote	%
Conservative	23,802	42.44
Liberal	21,816	38.90
New Democratic	8,302	14.80
People's	2,162	3.86

=== 2013 representation order ===
2021 Canadian federal election
Party	Candidate	Votes	%	±%	Expenditures
Conservative	Kerry-Lynne Findlay	24,158	42.45	+0.56	$116,744.84
Liberal	Gordie Hogg	22,166	38.95	+1.57	$106,156.01
New Democratic	June Liu	8,395	14.75	+3.18	$5,597.59
People's	Gary Jensen	2,186	3.84	+2.37	$2,520.21
Total valid votes/expense limit		56,905	99.41	–	$116,892.25
Total rejected ballots		340	0.59	+0.04	
Turnout		57,245	64.84	–4.08	
Eligible voters		88,281			
Conservative hold		Swing		–0.51	
Source: Elections Canada

2019 Canadian federal election
Party	Candidate	Votes	%	±%	Expenditures
Conservative	Kerry-Lynne Findlay	24,310	41.89	–0.39	$107,342.28
Liberal	Gordie Hogg	21,692	37.38	–9.99	$86,461.45
New Democratic	Stephen Crozier	6,716	11.57	+6.70	$16,252.90
Green	Beverly Pixie Hobby	4,458	7.68	+3.57	$6,434.86
People's	Joel Poulin	852	1.47	–	$5,942.36
Total valid votes/expense limit		58,028	99.44	–	$110,594.25
Total rejected ballots		326	0.56	+0.39	
Turnout		58,354	68.92	+30.78	
Eligible voters		84,664			
Conservative gain from Liberal		Swing		–	
Source: Elections Canada

Canadian federal by-election, December 11, 2017 Resignation of Dianne Watts
Party	Candidate	Votes	%	±%	Expenditures
Liberal	Gordie Hogg	14,369	47.37	+5.89	$88,736.12
Conservative	Kerry-Lynne Findlay	12,824	42.28	–1.75	$87,702.59
New Democratic	Jonathan Silveira	1,478	4.87	–5.54	$14,166.92
Green	Larry Colero	1,247	4.11	+0.69	$2,586.08
Christian Heritage	Rod Taylor	238	0.78	–	$9,833.08
Libertarian	Donald Wilson	89	0.29	–0.17	none listed
Progressive Canadian	Michael Huenefeld	86	0.28	+0.09	$508.36
Total valid votes/expense limit		30,331	99.83	–	$102,950.75
Total rejected ballots		52	0.17	–0.21	
Turnout		30,383	38.14	–35.85	
Eligible voters		79,653			
Liberal gain from Conservative		Swing		+3.82	
Source: Elections Canada

2015 Canadian federal election
Party	Candidate	Votes	%	±%	Expenditures
Conservative	Dianne Watts	24,934	44.03	-8.85	$161,579.40
Liberal	Judith Higginbotham	23,495	41.49	+22.40	$40,658.82
New Democratic	Pixie Hobby	5,895	10.41	-8.78	$38,925.44
Green	Larry Colero	1,938	3.42	-2.44	$12.62
Libertarian	Bonnie Hu	261	0.46	–	–
Progressive Canadian	Brian Marlatt	108	0.19	–	$400.00
Total valid votes/expense limit		56,631	100.00		$208,357.11
Total rejected ballots		219	0.39	–	
Turnout		56,850	74.73	–	
Eligible voters		76,078			
Conservative hold		Swing		-15.63	
Source: Elections Canada

2011 federal election redistributed results
Party	Vote	%
Conservative	23,890	52.9
New Democratic	8,671	19.2
Liberal	8,624	19.0
Green	2,648	5.9
Others	1,344	3.0

== See also ==
- List of Canadian electoral districts
- Historical federal electoral districts of Canada
