= Randy Hawes =

Canadian politician (born 1947)

Mayor of Mission
- In office 2014–2018
- Preceded by: Ted Adlem
- Succeeded by: Pam Alexis
- In office 1993–2001

Member of the British Columbia Legislative Assembly for Abbotsford-Mission
- In office May 12, 2009 – May 14, 2013
- Preceded by: Riding established
- Succeeded by: Simon Gibson

Member of the British Columbia Legislative Assembly for Maple Ridge-Mission
- In office May 16, 2001 – May 12, 2009
- Preceded by: Riding established
- Succeeded by: Marc Dalton

Minister of State for Mining of British Columbia
- In office June 10, 2009 – March 14, 2011
- Premier: Gordon Campbell
- Preceded by: Gordon Hogg
- Succeeded by: Position abolished

Personal details
- Born: 1947 (age 78–79) Edmonton, Alberta, Canada
- Party: BC Liberal
- Spouse: Alma Hawes (m. 1969)

Randy Clifford Hawes (born 1947) is a Canadian politician from British Columbia. He was a member of the Legislative Assembly (MLA) of BC, representing the provincial riding of Maple Ridge-Mission from 2001 to 2009, and Abbotsford-Mission from 2009 to 2013. As part of the British Columbia Liberal Party caucus, he served as Minister of State for Mining from 2009 to 2011 under Premier Gordon Campbell. He also served as mayor of Mission, British Columbia from 1993 to 2001, and from 2014 to 2018.

== Biography ==
Hawes was born in Edmonton, Alberta, and joined Toronto-Dominion Bank (TD) as a loans officer in 1972. He managed a number of bank locations around BC and Yukon, ending up in Mission in 1979. He left TD in 1986 to work in real estate and property development.

He was first elected to the municipal council of the District of Mission in 1987, serving a one-year term as councillor in 1987. He was then elected mayor of Mission in 1993, and served three consecutive terms until 2001. In those capacities he worked to advance services and expand the local tax base. In that time Hawes also served as chair of the Fraser Valley Regional District, as well as a member of the Fraser Valley Treaty Advisory Committee, the Fraser Valley Water Commission, and other bodies.

Hawes was first elected to the Legislative Assembly of British Columbia in the 2001 provincial general election as the member for Maple Ridge-Mission, and was re-elected in 2005, serving as Chief Government Whip from 2005 to 2009. He was re-elected to represent the new riding of Abbotsford-Mission in 2009, and was named to Premier Gordon Campbell's cabinet as Minister of State for Mining. He was not given a cabinet post when Christy Clark succeeded Campbell as premier in 2011.

Hawes had a number of health and social services roles during his time in the legislature, including serving as Chair of the Government Caucus Committee on Health, a member of the Legislative Assembly’s Standing Committee on Health, a member of the Project Steering committee for the new Regional Hospital and Cancer Centre in Abbotsford, the Coordinator of the Caucus Outreach Project, and the Caucus Committee on Seniors.

Hawes' responsibilities in the areas of transportation and environment included serving as Chair of the Streamside Setback Review committee, Chair of the Fraser Valley Aggregate Pilot Project, a member of the Burrard Thermal Options Committee, and the Small-Scale Salvage Review Committee. In the area of good governance, Hawes' responsibilities included serving as Chair of the Special Committee to Appoint a Chief Electoral Officer, a member of the Government Caucus Committee on Communities and Safety, a member of the Select Standing Committee on Public Accounts, a member of the Special Committee to Select a Merit Commissioner, and a member of the Legislative Review Committee.

Hawes announced in 2012 that he would not seek re-election as MLA in the following year's provincial election. He instead ran for his previous position as mayor of Mission in the 2014 municipal election, defeating incumbent Ted Adlem. He served another 4-year term as mayor, before losing to Pam Alexis in the 2018 municipal election.

== Personal life ==
Hawes has been married to wife Alma since 1969; they have three children. In spring 2009, Hawes and his wife participated in Food Network Canada's The 100 Mile Challenge.

Hawes' community service began with coaching minor hockey and baseball, and came to include a number of local organizations, including the Mission Community Health Council and the Ferndale Penitentiary Citizens' Advisory Committee. In addition he is a member of the Mission Mid-Day Rotary Club.

== Election results ==
2009 British Columbia general election: Abbotsford-Mission
| Party | Candidate | Votes | % | Expenditures |
|---|---|---|---|---|
| Liberal | Randy Hawes | 10,372 | 58.37 | $98,340 |
| New Democratic | Lynn Perrin | 5,788 | 32.57 | $5,514 |
| Green | Bill Walsh | 1,611 | 9.06 | $356 |
| Total valid votes | | 17,771 | 100.00 | |
| Total rejected ballots | | 160 | 0.89 | |
| Turnout | | 17,930 | 52.10 | |

2005 British Columbia general election: Maple Ridge-Mission
| Party | Candidate | Votes | % |
|---|---|---|---|
| Liberal | Randy Hawes | 12,095 | 44.30 |
| New Democratic | Jenny Stevens | 11,896 | 43.57 |
| Green | William Stanley Walsh | 2,633 | 9.64 |
| Marijuana | Carol Gwilt | 314 | 1.15 |
| Independent | Chum Richardson | 312 | 1.14 |
| Platinum | Keith Smith | 53 | 0.19 |
| Total | | 26,080 | 100.00 |

2001 British Columbia general election: Maple Ridge-Mission
| Party | Candidate | Votes | % | Expenditures |
|---|---|---|---|---|
| Liberal | Randy Hawes | 12,920 | 56.67 | $36,054 |
| New Democratic | Rose Bennett | 4,710 | 20.66 | $19,157 |
| Green | Dawn Paley | 2,910 | 12.76 | $296 |
| Unity | David Ritchie | 1,037 | 4.55 | $1,487 |
| Marijuana | Denise Briere-Smart | 908 | 3.98 | $394 |
| Independent | Dale Randall | 252 | 1.11 | $4,144 |
| Independent | Chum Richardson | 81 | 0.49 | $103 |
| Total valid votes | | 22,800 | 100.00 | |
| Total rejected ballots | | 127 | 0.56 | |
| Turnout | | 22,927 | 70.87 | |
