= List of mayors of White Rock, British Columbia =

The following is a list of mayors of White Rock, British Columbia.

- Charles Morris Defieux 1957
- William "Bill" Hodgson 1958–1959
- Harry T. Douglass 1960–1969
- John "Jack" Hynds 1970–1971
- Art Wall 1972–1973
- Don MacDonald 1974–1979
- Tom Kirstein 1980–1983
- Gordon J. Hogg 1984–1993
- Hardy Staub 1994–2002
- Judy Forster 2003–2008
- Catherine Ferguson 2008–2011
- Wayne Baldwin 2011–2018
- Darryl Walker 2018–2022
- Megan Knight 2022–present
