= Stan Wilbee =

Canadian politician

Member of Parliament for Delta
- In office 1988–1993
- Preceded by: riding created
- Succeeded by: John Cummins

Personal details
- Born: 12 May 1932 (age 93) Vancouver, British Columbia
- Party: Progressive Conservative
- Profession: Physician

Godfrey Stanley Wilbee (born 12 May 1932) was a member of the House of Commons of Canada from 1988 to 1993. Born in Vancouver, British Columbia, he was a medical doctor by career.

He was elected in the 1988 federal election at the Delta electoral district for the Progressive Conservative party. He served in the 34th Canadian Parliament but lost to John Cummins of the Reform Party in the 1993 federal election.
