= Delta—South Richmond =

Former federal electoral district in British Columbia, Canada

British Columbia electoral district

Defunct federal electoral district
- Legislature: House of Commons
- District created: 1996
- District abolished: 2004
- First contested: 1997
- Last contested: 2000

Delta—South Richmond was a federal electoral district in British Columbia, Canada, that was represented in the House of Commons of Canada from 1997 to 2004.

== History ==
This riding was created in 1996 from parts of Delta riding. It was only used in the 1997 and 2000 federal elections. In 2003, it was abolished when it was redistributed between Delta—Richmond East, Newton—North Delta and Richmond ridings.

== Members of Parliament ==
Parliament	Years	Member	Party
Delta—South Richmond; Riding created from Delta
36th	1997–2000	John Cummins	Reform
37th	2000–2003	John Cummins	Alliance
37th	2003–2004	John Cummins	Conservative
Riding dissolved into Delta—Richmond East, Newton—North Delta and Richmond

== Election results ==
2000 Canadian federal election
Party	Candidate	Votes	%	±%	Expenditures
Alliance	John Cummins	30,882	56.79	+10.29	$59,872
Liberal	Jim Doswell	15,858	29.16	–7.95	$67,469
Progressive Conservative	Curtis MacDonald	3,838	7.06	+1.55	$123
New Democratic	Ernie Fulton	3,060	5.63	–3.55	$2,416
Canadian Action	Allan Warnke	517	0.95	–	none listed
No affiliation	Frank Wagner	225	0.41	–0.19	$626
Total valid votes		54,380	99.69		
Total rejected ballots		170	0.31	–0.03	
Turnout		54,550	65.84	–2.91	
Eligible voters		82,852			
Alliance notional hold		Swing		–	
Source: Elections Canada

1997 Canadian federal election
Party	Candidate	Votes	%	Expenditures
Reform	John Cummins	23,891	46.50	$38,913
Liberal	Karen Morgan	19,071	37.11	$48,918
New Democratic	Lloyd Macdonald	4,715	9.18	$7,841
Progressive Conservative	Kevin Garvey	2,829	5.51	$24,908
Christian Heritage	Joe Pal	325	0.63	$4,647
Independent	Ruth Adams	308	0.60	$300
Natural Law	Matt Deacon	245	0.48	$5
Total valid votes		51,384	99.66	
Total rejected ballots		176	0.34	
Turnout		51,560	68.75	
Eligible voters		74,995		
Source: Elections Canada

== See also ==
- List of Canadian electoral districts
- Historical federal electoral districts of Canada
