= Nathan Fong =

Canadian chef (1959–2020)

- Born: Nathan Mark Fong; March 16, 1959; West Vancouver, British Columbia, Canada
- Died: March 30, 2020 (aged 61); Vancouver, British Columbia, Canada
- Education: University of British Columbia; Art Institute of Vancouver
- Occupations: Chef; Food stylist; Media personality
- Employer: Government of British Columbia
- Spouse: Michel Chicoine

Nathan Mark Fong (March 16, 1959 – March 30, 2020) was a Canadian chef, food stylist, media personality and activist.

== Early life and education ==
Nathan Mark Fong was born in West Vancouver on March 16, 1959. His parents were Edna and Robert Fong. He had four siblings and was the oldest. The Fong's owned an IGA grocery store in the Dundarave neighborhood of West Vancouver. When he was a teenager, Fong worked at the grocery store as a stocker.

Fong attended the University of British Columbia for commerce. He never completed his degree, deciding to study cooking at the Dubrulle Culinary Institute at the Art Institute of Vancouver. His classmates included Rob Feenie and Barbara-Jo McIntosh.

== Career in food and personal life ==
Fong started a catering company after graduating from Dubrulle. He transitioned into food styling soon thereafter. He styled food for photo shoots and commercials, including for McDonald's, Coca-Cola, Samsung, A&W, and White Spot. In 1998, Fong won the first International Association of Culinary Professionals Julia Child Award of Excellence for food styling. He won the Food Network Challenge's Superstar Foodstylist Competition in 2009.

Since 2012, Fong served as chef for the British Columbian government. He represented the province at tourism events, trade shows, international events and diplomatic receptions. He appeared regularly on the Today show during the show's 2010 Winter Olympics programming, showcasing British Columbian cuisine and food culture. In 2016, he participated in a reception for the Prince William, Duke of Cambridge and Catherine, Duchess of Cambridge. Fong persuaded Catherine to taste raw geoduck, while Prince William declined. That same year, he married his partner Michel Chicoine on January 16.

For decades, Fong hosted his TV show "Fong on Food" on Global Television Network and a weekly radio show by the same name. He was the executive chef producer of the BC Seafood Festival. He was a columnist for the Vancouver Sun and also contributed to Enroute, Bon Appetit, NUVO, Men's Health, Cooking Light and Fine Cooking.

Nathan was also a long-standing board member for BC & Yukon Chapter of the Travel Media Association of Canada (TMAC), including the BC Chapter Chair.

=== Activism ===
Fong was HIV-positive, which inspired him to become involved in HIV fundraising and pro-LGBTQ causes. In 2002, Fong created the Passions Gala, an annual wine and food event that benefited the Dr. Peter AIDS Foundation. As of 2019, the event has raised over $1.6 million for the Foundation. He was nominated for the Gemini Humanitarian Award in 2006 for his work with the Dr. Peter Centre. In 2006, he was awarded the BCPWA/Positive Living Society's AccolAIDS Philanthropy Award.

== Later life and death ==
Fong had diabetes and struggled to control it. He would often stop eating when he was feeling depressed, something he experienced with in the weeks prior to his death. In 2020, he also saw business plummet due to the cancelation of events in the wake of COVID-19 shelter in place orders. He visited Scottsdale, Arizona before travel bans and shelter-in-place went into effect and returned to Vancouver where he quarantined at his home.

The last week of March 2020, Fong fainted and fell, hitting his head. Fong was found dead, on March 30, at his home in Vancouver by his spouse Michel Chicoine. Officially, it has been said that he died of a suspected heart attack.

== In Memory of Nathan Fong ==
In memory of Nathan's work in journalism, the BC & Yukon Chapter of the Travel Media Association of Canada establish the annual Nathan Fong Memorial Award in 2021. This award is generously sponsored by Nathan's family in partnership with the BC & Yukon Chapter of TMAC.

This award was created to raise awareness and highlight the many contributions Canadians of Asian descent have made to Canada, and is awarded to members of TMAC who share stories with both an Asian and Canadian connection.

Recipients of the Nathan Fong Memorial Award, include:

Nathan Fong Memorial Award Winners
Year	Awarded	Story	Author
2024			
	First Place	From Jeju to Tofino: Korean chef adds new flavours to Vancouver Island — with a little help from his mother	Bianca Bujan
	Second Place	‘Toronto diners are curious’: Inside Pai chef’s new Chiang Mai-themed bar, Tha Phae Tavern	Amy Rosen
	Third Place	The Paper Trail Project: a glimpse into the shadows of Canadian history at the Chinese Canadian Museum in Vancouver	Jacqueline Louie
	Honourable Mention	Taste your way through Chinatown	Cinda Chavich
	Honourable Mention	Michelin-worthy Baan Lao escalates its culinary magic in Richmond	Wendy Nordvik-Carr
2023			
	First Place	Malaysian Chef Alex Chen makes Vancouver’s Michelin List	Bianca Bujan
	Second Place	On the Steveston Waterfront, a Thai Chef Blends Alchemy, Gastronomy, and Tradition	Caroyln Heller
	Third Place	A Chinese Tapestry	Lucas Aykroyd
2022			
	First Place	Behind the Stories at the Chinatown Storytelling Centre	Carolyn Heller
	Second Place	Mochi Cooking Class on the Culture Travels Podcast	Erica Hargreave, Manami Calvo & Maya Calvo
	Third Place	Business Owner Carol Lee’s Guide to Vancouver’s Chinatown	Diane Selkirk
	Honourable Mention	Dig into Richmond, BC's Stellar Asian Food Scene	Diana Ballon
	Honourable Mention	Sri Lankan Mani Pittu Recipe	Yashy Murphy
2021			
	First Place	Richmond Night Market	Will Tang
	Second Place	California roll creator Chef Tojo celebrates 50 years in Canada with a must-try menu	Bianca Bujan
	Third Place	When Vancouver’s Chinese Community Protested for Barbecue	Carolyn Heller
	Honourable Mention	Meet the New Generation of Canadian Winemakers with South Asian Roots	Carolyn Heller
