= Darryl Kropp =

Canadian politician

Darryl Kropp MLA

Member of the British Columbia Legislative Assembly for Abbotsford-Mission
- Incumbent
- Assumed office October 24, 2026
- Preceded by: Reann Gasper

Personal details
- Party: Conservative

Darryl Kropp MLA is a Canadian politician and tech executive who has served as member of the Legislative Assembly of British Columbia (MLA) representing the electoral district of Abbotsford-Mission since 2026. He is a member of the Conservative Party.

== Early career ==
A graduate of the Rotman School of Management, Kropp has served on executive roles of several aerospace and technology companies. In 2018, he was elected to the board of Tru Cooperative Bank, then known as First West Credit Union, and guided the company through its transition to its current name.

== Political career ==
In 2026, Kropp was selected to be the Conservative candidate in the electoral district replacing Reann Gasper after a by-election was cancelled. He defeated former New Democratic MLA Pam Alexis with over 56% of the vote.

== Electoral history ==
2026 British Columbia general election: Abbotsford-Mission
** Preliminary results — Not yet official **
Party	Candidate	Votes	%	±%
Conservative	Darryl Kropp	12,583	56.51	
New Democratic	Pam Alexis	7,965	35.77	
CentreBC	Lakhwinder Jhaj	780	3.50	–
OneBC	Virender Dass	569	2.56	–
Libertarian	Jeff Monds	319	1.43	–
Total valid votes		22,216		
Total rejected ballots		50		
Turnout		22,266		
Registered voters		TBA		
Conservative hold		Swing		
Source: Elections BC
