= Ernie Klassen =

Canadian politician

Ernie Klassen MP
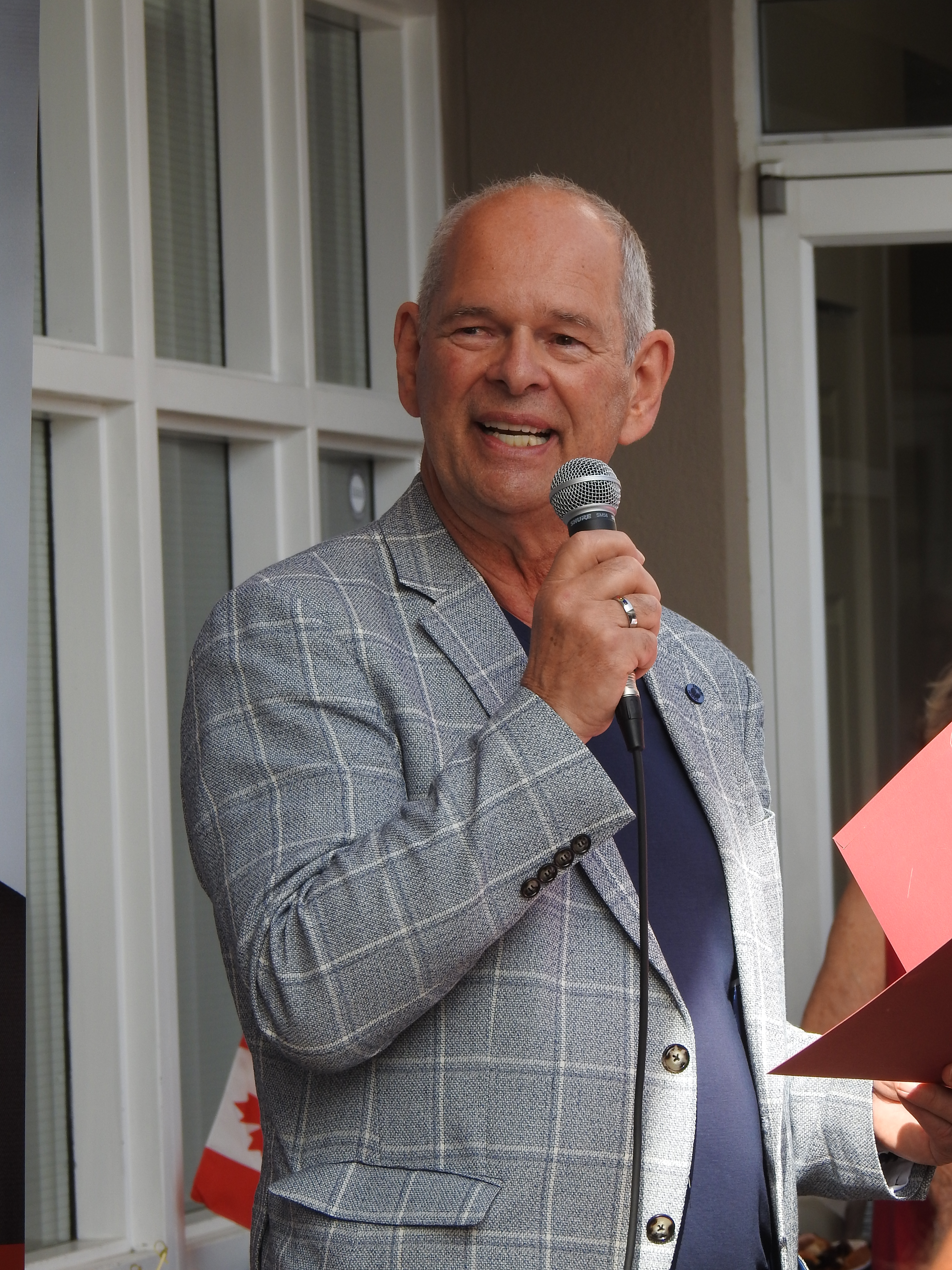
- Klassen in 2025

Parliamentary Secretary to the Minister of Fisheries
- Incumbent
- Assumed office June 5, 2025

Member of Parliament for South Surrey—White Rock
- Incumbent
- Assumed office April 28, 2025
- Preceded by: Kerry-Lynne Findlay

White Rock City Councillor
- In office October 15, 2022 – April 28, 2025

Personal details
- Born: Abbotsford, British Columbia, Canada
- Party: Liberal
- Spouse: Michael Barwell (m. 2011)
- Children: 3

Ernie Klassen MP is a Canadian politician serving as the member of Parliament (MP) for South Surrey—White Rock since 2025. A member of the Liberal Party, he was first elected in the 2025 federal election. When elected as a member of Parliament, Klassen was serving as a city councillor in White Rock. He was elected to that post in 2022.

== Political career ==
Klassen, who is openly gay, was previously the president of the White Rock Pride Society.

Klassen was elected to White Rock city council on October 15, 2022.

In 2024, BC United announced that Klassen was slated to be its candidate for Surrey South in the 2024 British Columbia provincial election. On August 28, 2024, BC United leader Kevin Falcon suspended its campaign and withdrew its candidates.

In 2025, Klassen was elected as member of Parliament for South Surrey—White Rock for the Liberal Party of Canada, defeating incumbent Kerry-Lynne Findlay.

== Electoral history ==
2025 Canadian federal election: South Surrey—White Rock
Party	Candidate	Votes	%	±%	Expenditures
Liberal	Ernie Klassen	33,094	50.50	+11.60	$103,687.08
Conservative	Kerry-Lynne Findlay	29,924	45.67	+3.23	$134,499.95
New Democratic	Jureun Park	1,634	2.49	–12.31	none listed
Green	Christine Kinnie	875	1.34	–	$4,957.34
Total valid votes/expense limit		65,527	99.44	–	$136,873.75
Total rejected ballots		368	0.56	–0.04	
Turnout		65,895	71.59	+6.75	
Eligible voters		92,041			
Liberal notional gain from Conservative		Swing		+4.19	
Source: Elections Canada
