= Greg Findlay =

Canadian football player (1942–2021)

No. 79
- Positions: Defensive end, Linebacker

Personal information
- Born: August 24, 1942; Timmins, Ontario, Canada
- Died: May 11, 2021 (aged 78); Langley, British Columbia, Canada
- Listed height: 6 ft 3 in (1.91 m)
- Listed weight: 245 lb (111 kg)

Career information
- High school: Vancouver College

Career history

Playing
- 1962–1973: BC Lions

Operations
- 1971–1972: CFLPA (President)

Awards and highlights
- Grey Cup champion (1964); CFL All-Star (1970); 2× CFL West All-Star (1968, 1970)

Donald George MacGregor Findlay (August 24, 1942 – May 11, 2021) was a professional Canadian football linebacker who played 12 years in the Canadian Football League (CFL) for the BC Lions from 1962 to 1973.

In 1971, while still an active player, Findlay became the third president of the Canadian Football League Players' Association.

Findlay's father Stephen Findlay played for the Hamilton Tigers in the 23rd Grey Cup. His sister is politician Kerry-Lynne Findlay. His son Anthony Findlay played for the Saskatchewan Roughriders in 1994. His grandson Jackson Findlay plays in the CFL. His nephew Brooks Findlay also played in the CFL.

Greg died on May 11, 2021, in Langley, British Columbia.
