= Reann Gasper =

Canadian politician

Member of the British Columbia Legislative Assembly for Abbotsford-Mission
- In office October 19, 2024 – August 22, 2026
- Preceded by: Pam Alexis
- Succeeded by: Darryl Kropp

Personal details
- Party: BC Conservative
- Education: LaSalle College

Reann Gasper is a Canadian politician who served as a member of the Legislative Assembly of British Columbia (MLA) representing the electoral district of Abbotsford-Mission from 2024 to 2026. A member of the Conservative Party, she resigned her seat in 2026 so party leader Kerry-Lynne Findlay could run in a by-election to have a seat in the legislature.

== Early life and career ==
Gasper is a mother of three and has been married to her partner for over 20 years. Beyond her family roles, she has actively raised funds and awareness for human trafficking, supporting both local and global organizations helping at-risk women and families. In her local community, she has volunteered at Lydia House events in Mission and supported organizations and local church outreaches that focus on helping the homeless community in Abbotsford.

She has served in multiple leadership roles on boards across organizations including BNI Leadership, Eldership Church Board, Youth Theatre Movement Board, Fraser Valley Real Estate Board, and the Electoral District Association.

Gasper holds a diploma of interior design from Lasalle College, a bachelor of arts in Christian ministry, a diploma in worship and creative arts, and a certificate in pastoral counselling. She is currently a licensed real estate agent with the Fraser Valley Real Estate Board and serves as a senior church leader for creative arts.

== Political career ==
On February 7, 2024, the Conservative Party of BC announced Gasper as their candidate for the riding of Abbotsford-Mission. She went on to unseat BC NDP incumbent and cabinet minister Pam Alexis, securing 55.39% of the vote. She served in the Conservative Party of BC leader John Rustad's shadow cabinet as the critic for child care, children and youth with support needs and then deputy caucus whip.

On August 22, 2026, Gasper announced she would step down as MLA, allowing recently elected party leader Kerry-Lynne Findlay to run for her seat in a by-election. Findlay subsequently hired her as deputy chief of staff-and later-chief of staff, a job Gasper lost days later, when Findlay resigned as party leader on September 20. As the by-election was cancelled, and Darryl Kropp was selected as the Conservative candidate for Abbotsford-Mission in the 2026 British Columbia general election.

== Electoral history ==
2024 British Columbia general election: Abbotsford-Mission
Party	Candidate	Votes	%	±%	Expenditures
Conservative	Reann Gasper	13,523	55.38	+49.8	$49,054.04
New Democratic	Pam Alexis	10,894	44.62	−1.8	$46,363.45
Total valid votes/expenses limit		24,417	99.60	–	$71,700.08
Total rejected ballots		98	0.40	–	
Turnout		24,515	57.42	–	
Registered voters		42,692			
Conservative notional gain from New Democratic		Swing		+25.8	
Source: Elections BC

== See also ==
- 43rd Parliament of British Columbia
