= Delta (federal electoral district) =

Federal electoral district in British Columbia, Canada

British Columbia electoral district
- Interactive map of riding boundaries from the 2025 federal election

Federal electoral district
- Legislature: House of Commons
MP
Jill McKnight
Liberal
- District created: 2013
- First contested: 2015
- Last contested: 2025
- District webpage: profile, map

Demographics
- Population (2016): 103,064
- Electors (2015): 77,892
- Area (km²): 207
- Pop. density (per km²): 497.9
- Census division: Metro Vancouver
- Census subdivision(s): Surrey (part), Delta, Tsawwassen, Musqueam

Delta is a federal electoral district in British Columbia, Canada, that was represented in the House of Commons of Canada from 1988 to 1997 and since 2015.

== History ==
The 1988–1997 edition of this riding was created in 1987 from parts of Fraser Valley West, Richmond—South Delta and Surrey—White Rock—North Delta ridings. During this period of time, the riding consisted of the District Municipality of Delta and the southwest part of the District Municipality of Surrey. It was abolished in 1996, and became part of Delta—South Richmond.

The riding was recreated following the 2012 federal electoral boundaries redistribution. The boundaries for this edition of the riding are perfectly coterminal with the District Municipality of Delta. The riding was created from parts of Newton—North Delta and Delta—Richmond East. These new boundaries were legally defined in the 2013 representation order, which came into effect upon the call of the 2015 Canadian federal election, scheduled for October 2015.

== Geography ==
The electoral district comprises the following:

1. Tsawwassen First Nation,
2. the entirety of the City of Delta and
3. a portion of the City of Surrey (including Newton) as described: commencing at the intersection between the western limit of said city and the right-of-way of the British Columbia Railroad, east along said railroad to the production of 125A Street, thence north along said street to 56 Avenue, thence east along said avenue 128 Street, thence north along said street to Highway 10, thence west along said highway to 126 Street, thence north along said street to 64 Avenue, thence west along said avenue to Scott Road and the western limit of Surrey, thence south along said road and limit to the point of origin.

== Demographics ==
Panethnic groups in Delta (2011−2021)
Panethnic group	2021		2016		2011	
Panethnic group	Pop.	%	Pop.	%	Pop.	%
European (Note: Statistic includes all persons that did not make up part of a visible minority or an indigenous identity.)	56,580	51.7%	62,285	61.3%	67,090	67.45%
South Asian	28,100	25.68%	20,495	20.17%	17,035	17.13%
East Asian (Note: Statistic includes total responses of "Chinese", "Korean", and "Japanese" under visible minority section on census.)	11,445	10.46%	9,365	9.22%	7,105	7.14%
Southeast Asian (Note: Statistic includes total responses of "Filipino" and "Southeast Asian" under visible minority section on census.)	4,525	4.13%	3,255	3.2%	3,170	3.19%
Indigenous	3,450	3.15%	2,950	2.9%	2,515	2.53%
African	1,120	1.02%	795	0.78%	595	0.6%
Latin American	1,060	0.97%	820	0.81%	715	0.72%
Middle Eastern (Note: Statistic includes total responses of "West Asian" and "Arab" under visible minority section on census.)	945	0.86%	520	0.51%	240	0.24%
Other (Note: Statistic includes total responses of "Visible minority, n.i.e." and "Multiple visible minorities" under visible minority section on census.)	2,205	2.01%	1,125	1.11%	1,005	1.01%
Total responses	109,435	98.84%	101,600	98.58%	99,465	98.88%
Total population	110,721	100%	103,064	100%	100,588	100%
Notes: Totals greater than 100% due to multiple origin responses. Demographics based on 2012 Canadian federal electoral redistribution riding boundaries.

== Members of Parliament ==
The riding has elected the following members of Parliament:

Parliament	Years	Member	Party
Delta; Riding created from Fraser Valley West, Richmond—South Delta and Surrey—White Rock—North Delta
34th	1988–1993	Stan Wilbee	Progressive Conservative
35th	1993–1997	John Cummins	Reform
Riding dissolved into Delta—South Richmond
Riding re-created from Newton—North Delta and Delta—Richmond East
42nd	2015–2019	Carla Qualtrough	Liberal
43rd	2019–2021	Carla Qualtrough	Liberal
44th	2021–2025	Carla Qualtrough	Liberal
45th	2025–present	Jill McKnight	Liberal

== Election results ==
Graph of election results in Delta (2013-present) (minor parties that never got 2% of the vote or didn't run consistently are omitted) View source data.

=== 2021—present ===
2025 Canadian federal election
Party	Candidate	Votes	%	±%	Expenditures
Liberal	Jill McKnight	32,802	51.83	+9.28	$118,216.69
Conservative	Jessy Sahota	27,314	43.15	+9.62	$123,210.05
New Democratic	Jason McCormick	2,787	4.40	–14.04	$2,265.82
People's	Natasa Sirotic	390	0.62	–1.86	$4,848.00
Total valid votes/expense limit		63,293	99.46		$130,926.91
Total rejected ballots		344	0.54	–0.03	
Turnout		63,637	74.12	+6.58	
Eligible voters		85,862			
Liberal notional hold		Swing		–0.17	
Source: Elections Canada

2021 federal election redistributed results
Party	Vote	%
Liberal	23,697	42.54
Conservative	18,681	33.54
New Democratic	10,276	18.45
People's	1,381	2.48
Green	1,244	2.23
Others	424	0.76

=== 2015–2021 ===
2021 Canadian federal election
Party	Candidate	Votes	%	±%	Expenditures
Liberal	Carla Qualtrough	22,105	42.26	+1.03	$103,546.64
Conservative	Garry Shearer	17,695	33.83	+0.84	$80,980.88
New Democratic	Monika Dean	9,591	18.33	+2.04	$3,705.19
People's	Paul Tarasenko	1,291	2.47	+0.71	$0.00
Green	Jeremy Smith	1,244	2.39	-3.89	$0.00
Independent	Hong Yan Pan	379	0.72	-	$0.00
Total valid votes/expense limit		52,305	99.43	+0.09	$109,817.32
Total rejected ballots		300	0.57	-0.09	
Turnout		52,605	67.54	-3.15	
Eligible voters		77,892			
Liberal hold		Swing		+0.10	
Source: Elections Canada

2019 Canadian federal election
Party	Candidate	Votes	%	±%	Expenditures
Liberal	Carla Qualtrough	22,257	41.2	-7.92	
Conservative	Tanya Corbet	17,809	33.0	+0.22	
New Democratic	Randy Anderson-Fennell	8,792	16.3	+1.38	
Green	Craig DeCraene	3,387	6.3	+3.13	
People's	Angelina Ireland	948	1.8	-	
Independent	Amarit Bains	398	0.7	-	
Independent	Tony Bennett	385	0.7	-	
Total valid votes/expense limit		53,976	100.0		
Total rejected ballots		361			
Turnout		54,337	70.7		
Eligible voters		76,871			
Liberal hold		Swing		-4.07	
Source: Elections Canada

2015 Canadian federal election
Party	Candidate	Votes	%	±%	Expenditures
Liberal	Carla Qualtrough	27,355	49.12	+30.55	$72,634.16
Conservative	Kerry-Lynne Findlay	18,255	32.78	-15.17	$174,408.46
New Democratic	Jeremy Leveque	8,311	14.92	-13.13	$59,352.24
Green	Anthony Edward Devellano	1,768	3.17	-1.57	–
Total valid votes/expense limit		55,689	100.00		$206,935.20
Total rejected ballots		200	0.36	–	
Turnout		55,889	74.47	–	
Eligible voters		75,044			
Liberal notional gain from Conservative		Swing		+22.86	
Source: Elections Canada

2011 federal election redistributed results
Party	Vote	%
Conservative	21,982	47.95
New Democratic	12,862	28.06
Liberal	8,514	18.57
Green	2,177	4.75
Others	307	0.67

=== 1987–1996 ===
Graph of election results in Delta (1987-1996) (minor parties that never got 2% of the vote or didn't run consistently are omitted) View source data.

1993 Canadian federal election
Party	Candidate	Votes	%	±%
Reform	John Cummins	17,161	38.30	+33.85
Liberal	Karen Morgan	13,750	30.69	+10.80
Progressive Conservative	Stan Wilbee	9,245	20.63	-23.62
New Democratic	Lloyd Macdonald	2,577	5.75	-23.36
National	John Waller	1,173	2.62	–
Christian Heritage	Keith Gee	347	0.77	-1.02
Natural Law	Joan Buzik	177	0.40	–
Green	Bryan Wagman	165	0.37	–
Independent	Benjamin Brian Wolfe	103	0.23	–
Independent	Ryan Bigge	59	0.13	–
Independent	Carollyne Tayler	36	0.08	–
Commonwealth of Canada	Nevenka Kos	11	0.02	–
Total valid votes		44,804	100.0	
Reform gain from Progressive Conservative		Swing		+11.52

1988 Canadian federal election
Party	Candidate	Votes	%
Progressive Conservative	Stan Wilbee	19,755	44.25
New Democratic	Sylvia Bishop	12,995	29.11
Liberal	Fred Gingell	8,880	19.89
Reform	John Cummins	1,987	4.45
Christian Heritage	Keith Gee	801	1.79
Independent	Gerard Baisch	134	0.30
Libertarian	Kurt Pokrandt	88	0.20
Total valid votes		44,640	100.0
This riding was created from parts of Fraser Valley West, Richmond—South Delta and Surrey—White Rock—North Delta, all of which elected a Progressive Conservative in the previous election.

== See also ==
- List of Canadian electoral districts
- Historical federal electoral districts of Canada

Historic ridings with the name Delta

- Burnaby—Richmond—Delta (1970–1976)
- Delta—Richmond East (2003–)
- Newton—North Delta (2003–)
- Richmond—South Delta (1976–1987)
- Surrey—White Rock—North Delta (1976–1987)
