= John Cummins (Canadian politician) =

Canadian politician (1942–2025)

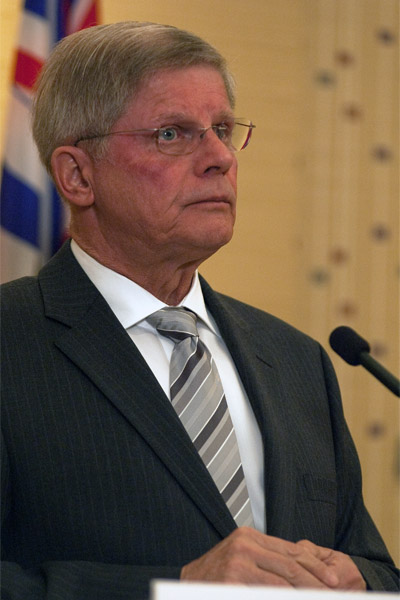
- Cummins in 2011

Leader of the Conservative Party of British Columbia
- In office May 28, 2011 – July 13, 2013
- Preceded by: Wilf Hanni (2009)
- Succeeded by: Dan Brooks (2014)

Member of Parliament for Delta—South Richmond Delta (1993–1997)
- In office October 25, 1993 – May 1, 2011
- Preceded by: Stan Wilbee
- Succeeded by: Kerry-Lynne Findlay

Personal details
- Born: John Martin Cummins; March 12, 1942 Georgetown, Ontario, Canada
- Died: March 2, 2025 (aged 82) Kamloops, British Columbia, Canada
- Party: Conservative (federal); BC Conservative (provincial)
- Other political affiliations: Reform (1993–2000); Canadian Alliance (2000–2003)
- Spouse: Sue Cummins
- Profession: Commercial fisherman, teacher

John Martin Cummins (March 12, 1942 – March 2, 2025) was a Canadian politician who served as the leader of the Conservative Party of British Columbia from 2011 to 2013. Federally, as member of the Conservative Party of Canada, he represented the riding of Delta—Richmond East in the House of Commons from 1993 to 2011, when he turned to provincial politics becoming the leader of the unaffiliated provincial Conservative Party.

== Early life and education ==
Born in Georgetown, Ontario, Cummins obtained a bachelor's degree from the University of Western Ontario where he attended King's University College and a master's degree from the University of British Columbia.

== Before politics ==
Before entering politics, Cummins worked in the pulp and paper industry in Ontario, the oil fields of Alberta and on the construction of the W. A. C. Bennett Dam in northern British Columbia. He taught school in the Northwest Territories and in the Peace River district of northern Alberta, then spent fifteen years teaching in Delta, British Columbia. Cummins was also a commercial fisherman; he owned and operated commercial fishing boats in BC for over 20 years.

== Politics ==
Cummins was first elected to the House of Commons in the 1993 election, as a Reform Party member. He was re-elected in 1997, 2000 (as a member of the Canadian Alliance), 2004, 2006, and 2008 (as a Conservative).

As a member of Parliament, Cummins served twice as party critic for fisheries and oceans, in addition to his work on various other House of Commons and joint committees.

On October 19, 2010, Bill Tieleman wrote about John Cummins convention speech where Tieleman writes that "the BC Conservatives are going to target not only disgruntled BC Liberal voters but also the NDP's traditional support bases".

On March 12, 2011, Cummins announced that he would not be seeking re-election in the federal election held on May 2, 2011. On March 29, 2011, Cummins announced he would seek the leadership of the Conservative Party of British Columbia, and was acclaimed leader at the party's convention on May 28, 2011.

On November 28, 2011, Cummins recommended that a review of the Royal Canadian Mounted Police in BC, including whether a provincial police force should be considered. This was announced following a review from Brian Peckford.

== Controversies ==
During an interview on CFAX 1070 Radio on May 11, 2011, prior to becoming leader of the BC Conservatives, Cummins was questioned by the host of the radio show about his stance on gay rights following a suggestion that homosexuality was a choice. He issued an apology a couple days later, saying "My comments on CFAX radio this past Wednesday may have been misinterpreted and may have offended some. I apologize for that".

== Death ==
Cummins died at the Royal Inland Hospital in Kamloops, British Columbia, on March 2, 2025, at the age of 82. He had been in ill health following a stroke in August 2020.
