= Simon Gibson =

Canadian politician

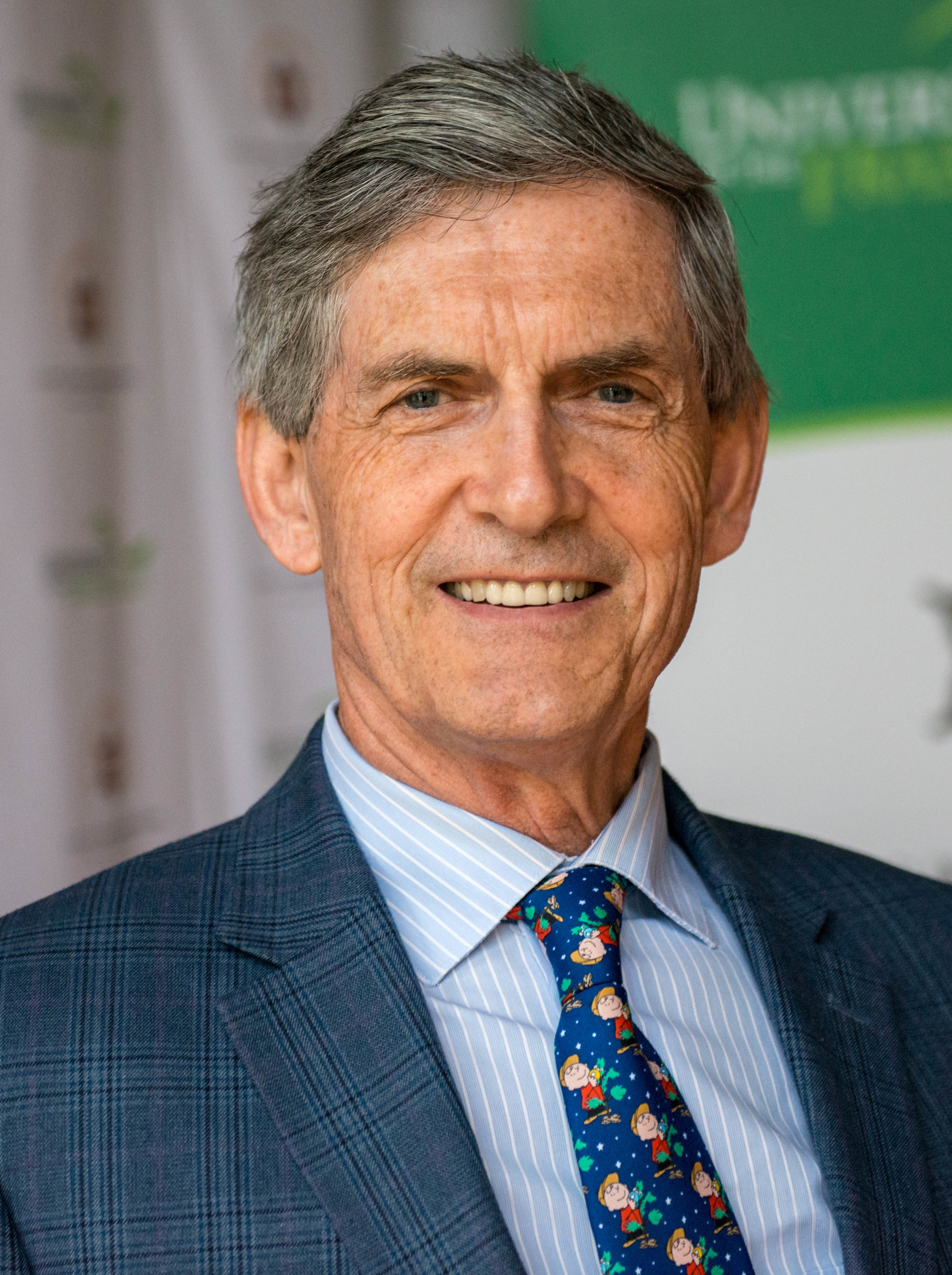

Member of the British Columbia Legislative Assembly for Abbotsford-Mission
- In office May 14, 2013 – September 21, 2020
- Preceded by: Randy Hawes
- Succeeded by: Pam Alexis

Personal details
- Born: 1949 or 1950 (age 75–76)
- Party: BC Liberal

Simon John Gibson (born 1950) is a Canadian politician who, after being defeated in the 1996 provincial election as a candidate for the Reform Party, was elected to the Legislative Assembly of British Columbia in the 2013 provincial election and again in the 2017 provincial election. He represented the electoral district of Abbotsford-Mission as a member of the British Columbia Liberal Party until his defeat in the 2020 provincial election. During his two terms in the BC Legislature, he served as Parliamentary Secretary for Independent Schools and as Opposition critic for Advanced Education.

Prior to his election, Gibson was a member of Abbotsford City Council for more than 30 years. In the 2022 municipal elections, he was again elected to Abbotsford City Council.

== Electoral record ==
2017 British Columbia general election: Abbotsford-Mission
Party	Candidate	Votes	%	±%	Expenditures
Liberal	Simon Gibson	12,879	51.19	+0.52	$50,561
New Democratic	Andrew Murray Christie	7,339	29.17	+1.97	$284
Green	Jennifer Holmes	4,297	17.08	+8.01	$1,482
Christian Heritage	Dan Cameron	644	2.56	–	$466
Total valid votes		25,159	100.00		
Total rejected ballots		135	0.53		
Turnout		25,294	59.20		
Source: Elections BC

2013 British Columbia general election: Abbotsford-Mission
Party	Candidate	Votes	%	±%	Expenditures
Liberal	Simon Gibson	10,417	50.67	−7.7	$61,719
New Democratic	Preet Rai	5,591	27.20	−5.37	$51,805
Conservative	Don Stahl	1,946	9.47	–	$5,271
Green	Aird Flavelle	1,865	9.07	+0.01	$3,377
Independent	Wendy Bales	415	2.02	–	$2,699
Independent	Roman Bojczuk	204	0.99	–	$2,547
Excalibur	Marcus Halliday	119	0.58	–	$310
Total valid votes		20,557	100.00		
Total rejected ballots		117	0.57		
Turnout		20,674	56.63		
Source: Elections BC
