= LaSalle College =

College in Montreal, Canada

LaSalle College/Montreal
- Motto: Make the world your classroom
- Type: College
- Established: 1959
- Parent institution: LCI Education network
- Affiliations: Non-Denominational
- Academic affiliations: ACCC, CCAA, CBIE
- Students: International & Local
- Undergraduates: Pre-university, Technical
- Postgraduates: Not available
- Location: 2000 Sainte-Catherine Street West; H3H 2T2, Montreal, Quebec, Canada; 45°29′29″N 73°34′53″W
- Campus: Urban
- Colours: Blue & Orange
- Website: www.collegelasalle.com

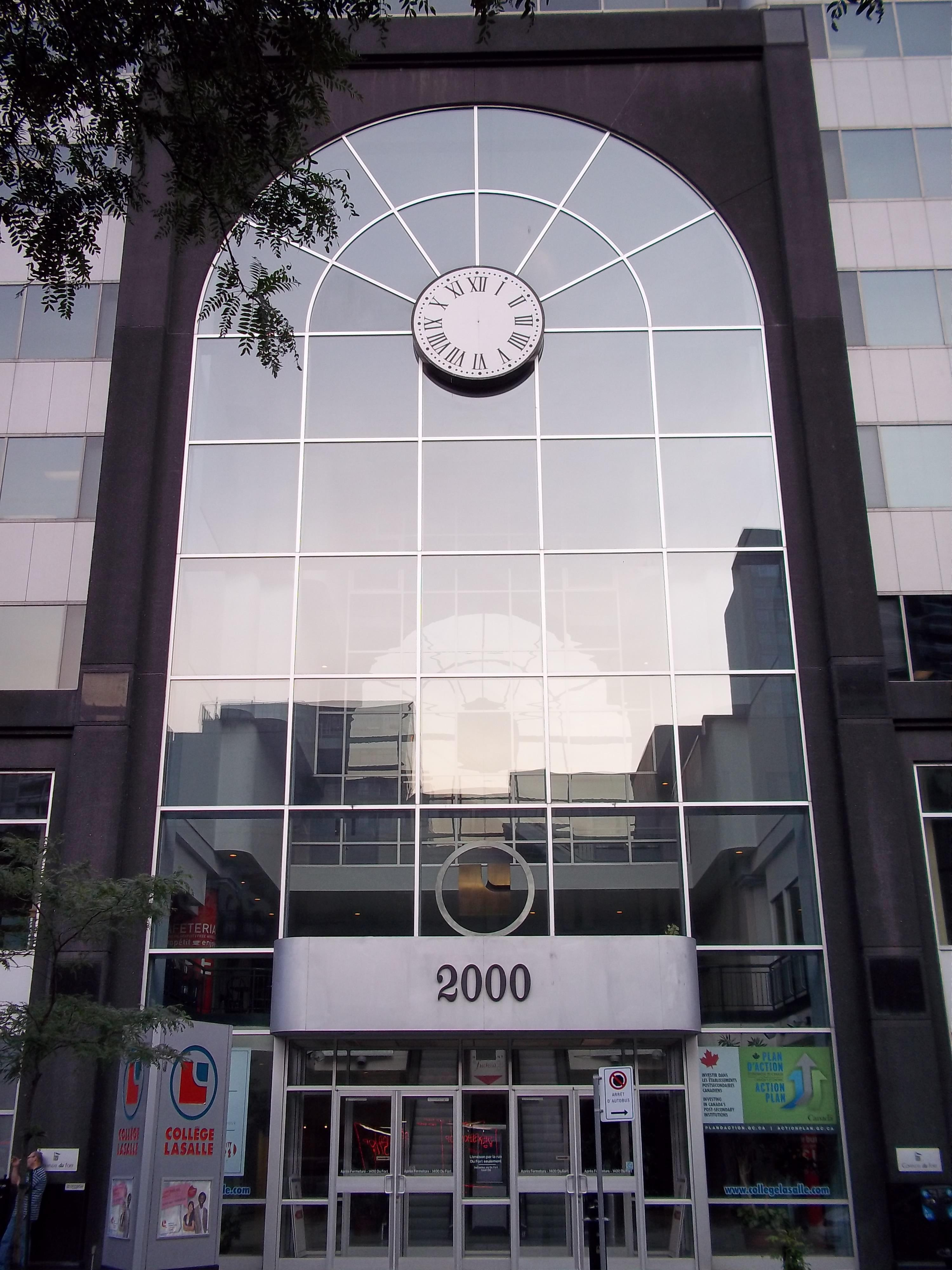
College LaSalle 2000 rue Sainte-Catherine

LaSalle College (French: Collège LaSalle) was founded in Montreal, in the province of Quebec, Canada, in 1959 by Jean-Paul Morin. The college offers over 60 DCS (pre-university and technical) and ACS programs. It is the largest bilingual college in North America, with 7 specialized schools: Art, Design and Communication, Business and Management, Education and Social Sciences, Fashion, Gaming, Animation and VFX, Hospitality and Tourism and Information Technology.

== History ==
LaSalle College was founded in 1959 by Jean-Paul Morin, who is often referred to as "the father of fashion design in Quebec." His goal was to give the Quebec population, at the time, new career opportunities by receiving education directly from experts. The first program offered was a secretarial course.

== Timeline ==
- 1959: Founder, Jean-Paul Morin opens LaSalle Commercial College in Ville LaSalle and offers secretarial training.
- 1963: Jean-Paul Morin sets a trend by taking initiative: his college is the first to hold an "open house," to print a color ad in Quebec, and do television advertising.
- 1966: Designed by professors of the Fashion Institute of Technology of New York, LaSalle College launches its Fashion Marketing program.
- 1970: A placement service is put in place for graduates of LaSalle College.
- 1971: In collaboration with the Hotel Sheraton, LaSalle College launches its Hotel Management program.
- 1973: LaSalle College receives the status of "collegial establishment" from the ministère de l’Éducation du Québec.
- 1973: The first fashion school in Canada is born. The three-year Fashion Design program is launched whereby graduates receive a diploma of collegial studies (DEC)
- 1978: The ministère de l’ Éducation du Québec recognizes LaSalle College as the "Centre specialisé de la mode"
- 1979: Mr. Jacques Marchand joins LaSalle College.
- 1983: College Inter-Dec opens, offering programs in beauty, video games and design.
- 1988: Jean-Paul Morin retires.
- 1988: Mrs. Jacques Marchand and Jacques Lefebvre acquire the college.
- 1989: The first LaSalle College International opens in Casablanca, Morocco.
- 1989: The Fondation de la Mode de Montréal is created to support training and research in the fashion industry.
- 1995: L’École supérieure de mode de Montréal (ÉSMM) is created in partnership with l’Université de Québec à Montréal offering a bachelor's degree in fashion design and management
- 1996: The resto-bar Le Fuchsia opens and acts as a laboratory for the International School of Hotel Management and Tourism.
- 1996: The Montréal International Language Centre (MILC) is created, providing courses in English and French as a second language, alongside seven other foreign languages.
- 1998: LaSalle College International opens in Vancouver, BC.
- 2000: LaSalle College opens an e-learning school and invests in developing online learning services.
- 2010: Portfolios (formerly known as UXIBUS) is launched, a website for graduates to showcase their work, search for jobs and where employers can browse through profiles to find potential candidates.
- 2014: After 25 years, LaSalle College changes its image and logo.
- 2014: Claude Marchand becomes CEO of LCI Education.
- 2017: LCI Education network acquires The Art Institute of Vancouver which continues as LaSalle College Vancouver, in Vancouver, Canada.
- 2019: LaSalle College integrate all of Inter-Dec College’s programs under its banner, including the interior design, digital arts, video games and beauty programs.
- 2024: LaSalle College modernize its image and its digital experience with the launch of its new website.

== Awards and recognition ==
- In 2013, New York-based fashion blog Fashionista.com ranked LaSalle College #33 out of the "Top 50 Fashion Schools in the World."
- In 2014, LaSalle College students earned 4 out of the 5 prizes awarded at the Télio Design Competition (A Quebec-based, wholesale textiles distributor).

== See also ==
- List of colleges in Quebec
- Higher education in Quebec
- Canadian Inter-university Sport
- Canadian government scientific research organizations
- Canadian university scientific research organizations
- Canadian industrial research and development organizations
