= Kerry-Lynne Findlay =

Canadian politician (born 1955)

The Honourable Kerry-Lynne Findlay PC KC
- Findlay in 2026

Leader of the Conservative Party of British Columbia
- In office May 30, 2026 – September 20, 2026
- Parliamentary leader: Trevor Halford; Heather Maahs
- Preceded by: Trevor Halford (interim)
- Succeeded by: Lorne Doerkson (interim)

Minister of National Revenue
- In office July 15, 2013 – November 4, 2015
- Prime Minister: Stephen Harper
- Preceded by: Gail Shea
- Succeeded by: Diane Lebouthillier
Other positions
Chief Opposition Whip
In office September 13, 2023 – April 28, 2025
Leader	Pierre Poilievre
Preceded by	Blaine Calkins
Succeeded by	Chris Warkentin
Associate Minister of National Defence
In office February 22, 2013 – July 15, 2013
Prime Minister	Stephen Harper
Preceded by	Bernard Valcourt
Succeeded by	Julian Fantino
Parliamentary Secretary to the Minister of Justice
In office May 25, 2011 – February 21, 2013
Minister	Rob Nicholson

Member of Parliament
- In office October 21, 2019 – April 28, 2025
- Preceded by: Gordie Hogg
- Succeeded by: Ernie Klassen
- Constituency: South Surrey—White Rock
- In office May 30, 2011 – August 4, 2015
- Preceded by: John Cummins
- Succeeded by: Constituency abolished
- Constituency: Delta—Richmond East

Personal details
- Born: Kerry-Lynne Donna Findlay; January 12, 1955 (age 71) Ladysmith, British Columbia, Canada
- Party: Conservative (provincial); Conservative (federal)
- Other political affiliations: Liberal (federal; 1980s–1990s); Canadian Alliance (until 2003); Conservative Electors Association (since 2025)
- Spouses: A. Boyd Ferris (died 1989) Brent Chapman (m. 1993)
- Relatives: Greg Findlay (brother)
- Education: University of British Columbia
- Profession: Lawyer; Politician

Kerry-Lynne Donna Findlay (born January 12, 1955), commonly known by her initials KLF, is a Canadian politician and lawyer who served as leader of the Conservative Party of British Columbia from May to September 2026. She had served as a member of Parliament (MP) for South Surrey—White Rock from 2019 to 2025 and Delta—Richmond East from 2011 to 2015 with the federal Conservative Party. Findlay was Associate Minister of National Defence in 2013, and Minister of National Revenue from 2013 to 2015 under Prime Minister Stephen Harper.

== Early life and legal career ==
Kerry-Lynne Findlay was born in 1955 in Ladysmith, British Columbia, and lived in Nanaimo and Victoria; her brother Greg Findlay was a linebacker for the BC Lions Canadian Football League (CFL) team. She comes from a family with many former CFL players; Findlay's father Stephen Findlay played for the Hamilton Tigers in the 23rd Grey Cup. After graduating from Crofton House School in Vancouver, she attended the University of British Columbia, receiving a Bachelor of Arts degree in history and political science in 1975, and a law degree in 1978.

She articled at Kowarsky and Company in Vancouver, then worked there as an associate for two years before briefly serving as in-house counsel for the Insurance Corporation of British Columbia. She established her own practice in 1981, then joined Connell Lightbody in 1987 before switching to Watson Goepel Maledy in 1996. During her legal career, Findlay has been active in both the national and B.C. provincial branch of the Canadian Bar Association. She held various positions in that organization including national and provincial chair of the Constitutional Law Section and member of the National Task Force on Canadian Court Reform, and she was acclaimed president of the B.C. Branch for the 1997–1998 term. Findlay was appointed Queen's Counsel in March 1999 by the Attorney General of British Columbia, and served a five-year term as a Member of the Canadian Human Rights Tribunal by appointment of the Federal Minister of Justice (2006–2011).

== Political career ==
In the 1980s and 1990s, Findlay was a supporter of the Liberal Party of Canada. She attended national conventions as a delegate, was an executive member of the Liberal Party Women's Commission, and an executive member of the party for the Vancouver Centre riding association.

Findlay entered politics during the 2000 federal election as a Canadian Alliance candidate in the riding of Vancouver Quadra, but lost to Liberal candidate Stephen Owen.

=== Federal politics (2011–2025) ===
She was named the Conservative Party's candidate for Delta—Richmond East in March 2011, and won the seat in that year's federal election. During the 41st Parliament, she served as member of the House of Commons Standing Committee on Justice and Human Rights, and sat on a selection panel to help choose a replacement for Marie Deschamps of Quebec, who retired as puisne justice of the Supreme Court of Canada. She was named Parliamentary Secretary to the Minister of Justice in May 2011, and as Associate Minister of National Defence on February 22, 2013. She then served as the Minister of National Revenue from July 15, 2013, until November 4, 2015.

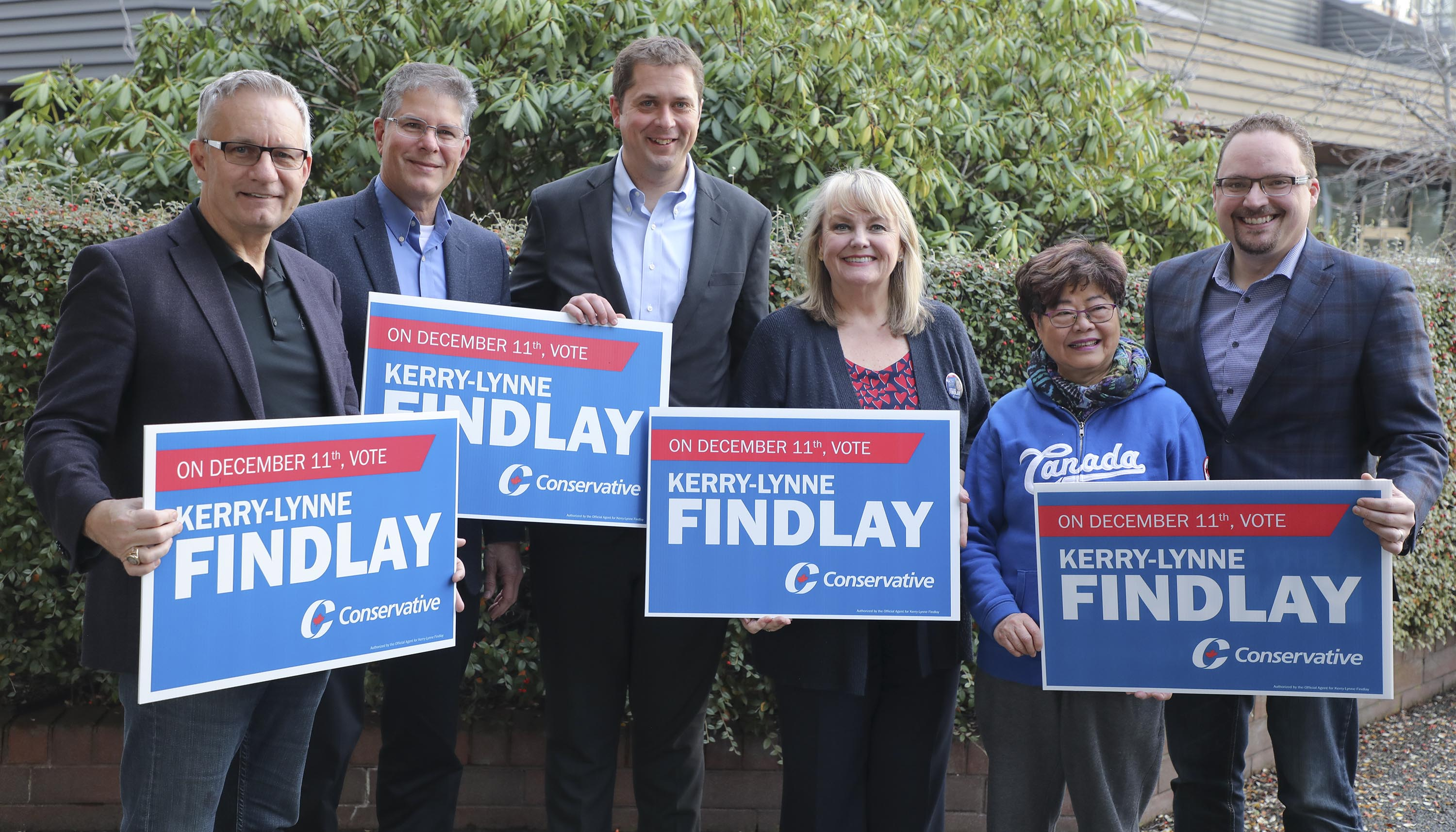
Party leader Andrew Scheer campaigning with Findlay in December 2017

She contested the reconstituted riding of Delta in the 2015 election, but lost to Liberal candidate Carla Qualtrough. She then ran for the Conservatives in the 2017 South Surrey—White Rock by-election, but was defeated by the Liberal's Gordie Hogg, taking 42.1% of the vote to Hogg's 47.5%.

In a re-match at the 2019 election, Findlay unseated Hogg by taking 42.6% of the vote. She served as shadow minister for Environment and Climate Change from November 2019 to September 2020. She received backlash in August 2020 after retweeting another user's Twitter post trying to connect Chrystia Freeland with George Soros. She voted in support of Bill C-233 – an act to amend the Criminal Code (sex-selective abortion), which would make it an indictable or a summary offence for a medical practitioner to knowingly perform an abortion solely on the grounds of the child's genetic sex.

She was re-elected in 2021 by defeating Gordie Hogg again, and served as shadow minister for National Defence from November 2021 to October 2022. Following Erin O'Toole's ousting as Conservative leader in February 2022, Findlay announced her intention to run for interim party leader; Candice Bergen was ultimately chosen for the role. On September 13, 2022, Findlay was named Chief Opposition Whip by Conservative Party leader Pierre Poilievre, becoming the first woman to serve in this role for the Conservatives.

She lost re-election in the 2025 election. Some observers attributed her loss to comments made by her husband Brent Chapman, who is the MLA for Surrey South. In May 2026, the federal election watchdog announced Findlay was under investigation over expenses for her failed re-election bid. Elections Canada alleges Findlay received $75,000 in undeclared and unpaid services from a corporation in exchange for promised federal contracts. They further suggest that approximately 50 individuals described as foreign nationals without legal status, canvassed on behalf of Findlay. In response, Findlay threatened legal action against the media for publishing any story mentioning these allegations.

=== Municipal politics (2025–2026) ===
On September 17, 2025, Findlay became the advisory board chair of the Conservative Electors Association, a newly formed municipal party in British Columbia. Her role was to help with candidate recruitment and policy development.

In February 2026, Findlay was involved in a launch event for the Conservative Electors Association, where they announced the slate of candidates for the 2026 Surrey municipal election.

=== Leader of the BC Conservatives (May–September 2026) ===
On May 30, 2026, Findlay was elected leader of the Conservative Party of British Columbia with 51% of the vote. She took over from interim leader Trevor Halford following the resignation of John Rustad in December 2025.

During the leadership campaign, Findlay faced criticism within her own party for saying fellow leadership candidate Peter Milobar had a conflict of interest when it comes to reconciliation because his wife is Indigenous. In response, Milobar called Findlay's attacks "the worst side of politics possible,” suggesting her victory would “give a lot of British Columbians pause for thought of whether they would actually vote for a party like this.” He would later leave the party in August 2026. Findlay has also received criticism from former Conservative MLA Elenore Sturko, who called her "radical on the right wing," saying she’s been copied on several emails from B.C. Conservative members cancelling their memberships. Former BC United MLA Karin Kirkpatrick called Findlay's victory "very, very bad for the Conservative party." On June 29, she conducted a shadow cabinet reshuffle, appointing MLA Heather Maahs as leader of the Opposition. On July 3, 2026, former BC Conservative MLA Amelia Boultbee crossed the floor to join the governing BC NDP caucus, citing a shift toward "Trump-style populism" under new BC Conservative leader Findlay as the reason she would not be returning to its caucus.

Findlay received criticism in July 2026 after her senior staff and MLAs were allegedly directed to no longer use the term "First Nations", but instead to use terms like "Indian". Although "Indian" is generally regarded as an archaic and offensive term, Findlay allegedly argued that its appearance in legal and official documents such as the federal Indian Act justified its use. Findlay denied that such a directive was given. In response to the allegations, former Premier of British Columbia Christy Clark called Findlay "kooky" and said Findlay "cannot win an election."

In August 2026, Ian Paton accusing Findlay of offering him a paid job with an MLA's salary if he resigned his seat for her. Similarly, Rosalyn Bird said that when she refused to resign to allow Findlay to run in her riding, she threw a "tantrum," writing "she yelled at me, told me I was being selfish, told me this was about a bigger picture, then she hung up. The conversation was less than a minute." On August 23, 2026 Reann Gasper announced that she would step down as MLA of Abbotsford-Mission and allow party leader Findlay to run for her seat in a by-election. Gasper was promptly hired as Findlay’s deputy chief of staff. Offering an inducement in return for a politician’s resignation is a criminal offence.

In August and September 2026, ten Conservative MLAs resigned from the party, criticizing Findlay's leadership. Richmond-Bridgeport MLA Teresa Wat claims Findlay made “unfounded accusations about me, including remarks that called my allegiance to Canada into question,” stating she "cannot continue to sit in a caucus led by someone who has questioned my loyalty without evidence and, when given the opportunity to correct the record, has failed to do so.” Courtenay-Comox MLA Brennan Day issued a statement criticizing Findlay's leadership, writing "I have lost confidence in the judgement, conduct, and ethical standards of her leadership and those she has chosen to surround herself with." Abbotsford South MLA Bruce Banman, the first MLA to cross the floor and join John Rustad as a Conservative, wrote "person after person has informed me they have decided that our new leader is unelectable," instead he is "joining an ever increasing number of MLAs to sit as an independent MLA in the BC Legislature". Banman also wrote he "would encourage my fellow MLAs regardless of political affiliation to join me." Boundary-Similkameen MLA Donegal Wilson cited Findlay's hiring of "Alberta separatist[s]" as the reason for her resignation, along with Findlay's inability to "bring Conservatives back together.” MLAs Ian Paton of Delta-South, Peter Milobar of Kamloops Centre, Rosalyn Bird of Prince George-Valemount, Áʼa꞉líya Warbus of Chilliwack-Cultus Lake, Scott McInnes of Columbia River-Revelstoke, and Linda Hepner of Surrey-Serpentine River also announced their resignation from the party.

In September 2026, Findlay removed three MLAs from the Conservative caucus for questioning her leadership. Former interim leader of the party and MLA for Surrey-White Rock Trevor Halford, former leader and MLA for Nechako Lakes John Rustad, and MLA for Skeena Claire Rattée were all removed. Rattée issued a statement claiming Findlay was “attempting to oust members of her own caucus, demonstrating poor judgement that doesn’t befit someone who is attempting to become premier.”

Since July 2026, multiple staffers have also resigned from the party, including former executive director Angelo Isidorou, former party president Aisha Estey and former vice-president Sharon White. These positions have been replaced by many controversial figures, including Apollo Chung, a former member of the separatist Republican Party of Alberta, and Chris Delaney, notable for his ties to former British Columbia Premier Bill Vander Zalm.

In September 2026, allegations emerged that Findlay had hired a private investigator to watch Conservative critics, including sitting Conservative MLAs and a journalist. Findlay claims she was "unaware." MLA for Skeena Claire Rattée, who identified herself as one of the targets, said at least 10 members of caucus have signed a letter asking Findlay to resign. Rattée was later removed from caucus by Findlay. Former Conservative MLA Brennan Day, and former party executive director Angelou Isidorou also identified themselves as alleged targets.

On September 20, 2026, Findlay announced her resignation as leader of the Conservative Party of BC. The by-election was cancelled, and Darryl Kropp was selected as the Conservative candidate for Abbotsford-Mission in the 2026 British Columbia general election.

== Political positions ==
Kerry-Lynne Findlay has positioned herself as right-wing populist, socially conservative, and a Blue Tory. She has described herself as a “reliable Conservative,” and an outsider taking on “insiders” with a “hidden liberal agenda” and “mainstream media gatekeepers.” Findlay has emphasized “faith, family, and freedom” as guiding her leadership, and is politically compared to former British Columbia premier Bill Vander Zalm.

=== Economic issues ===
She has strongly opposed carbon pricing and, as an opposition MP, argued that the federal carbon price increased household costs; she called for its abolition, making opposition to carbon taxation a prominent component of her economic and environmental politics. As leader of the BC Conservative Party, she has pledged to fight for the restoration of marine finfish farming licenses and oppose any federal government intervention on the issue.

=== Indigenous rights ===
Findlay has also made opposition to Indigenous rights, including the repeal of DRIPA, core to her platform while campaigning for leadership of the BC Conservative Party. She accused leadership rival Peter Milobar of having a conflict of interest in how he handled opposition to the legislation because his wife and other family members were Indigenous, which led to accusations of racism. In her acceptance speech as leader, she doubled down, stressing “The NDP’s radical ideology has devastated property rights, backroom-signed treaties, and the NDP’s economic vandalism has to end.”

Findlay and her staff were also alleged to have issued guidance to several caucus members and their staffers that they were to use the terms Indigenous, Aboriginal or Indian instead of First Nations. Her office was said to have cited the federal Indian Act as justification for using this term. When questioned by Black Press, she denied the allegations, claiming “It’s simply not true. There was no directive, nothing like that.”

=== LGBTQ+ rights ===
At the same time, her federal voting record included support for legislation protecting gender identity and expression under Canadian human rights and criminal law. In 2021, she stated that she opposed coercive conversion therapy. Still, she criticized Bill C-6 because its definition was, in her view, too broad and insufficiently precise.

While campaigning for leadership of the Conservative Party of British Columbia, she promised to end provincial sexual orientation and gender identity inclusive (SOGI) education.

== Personal life ==
Findlay was married to lawyer A. Boyd Ferris, with whom she had two children. After Ferris died from a heart attack in 1989, she met actor Brent Chapman. The two married in 1993 and had two more daughters together; they also have nine grandchildren. Chapman was elected as the provincial MLA for Surrey South in the 2024 British Columbia general election.

Findlay is a member of the All-Saints Community Church in White Rock, British Columbia, which is part of the Anglican Mission in the Americas, through its Canadian branch.

Findlay's volunteer posts, in addition to the Canadian Bar Association, have included chair of the Vancouver City Planning Commission, board member of Science World, executive member of the Junior Leagues of Canada, president of Delta Zeta chapter of Alpha Gamma Delta International Fraternity, and honorary counsel for the Chinese Benevolent Association of Canada. In 2016, she was named a Distinguished Citizen by Alpha Gamma Delta.

In 2001, she declared bankruptcy with more than a half million dollars in debt. She attributed the bankruptcy to a legal battle with the Musqueam First Nation.

== Electoral history ==
=== Leadership elections ===
= Eliminated from next round
= Winner

Candidate	Ballot 1		Ballot 2		Ballot 3		Ballot 4	
Name	Votes	Points	Votes	Points	Votes	Points	Votes	Points
Kerry-Lynne Findlay	7,583 29.9%	2806.42 30.5%	7,844 30.9%	2961.53 32.2%	9,050 35.7%	3559.78 38.6%	10,907 43.0%	4696.51 51.0%
Caroline Elliott	6,760 26.7%	2374.14 25.8%	7,393 29.2%	2638.74 28.6%	7,800 30.76%	2883.71 31.3%	10,847 42.8%	4514.49 49.0%
Iain Black	4,902 19.3%	1865.82 20.3%	6,077 24.0%	2328.21 25.3%	6971 27.5%	2767.51 30.0%	Eliminated	
Yuri Fulmer	3,163 12.5%	1193.27 13.0%	3,344 13.2%	1282.52 13.9%	Eliminated			
Peter Milobar	2,893 11.4%	971.34 10.5%	Eliminated					
Total Valid	25,301	9211.0	24,658	9211.0	23,821	9211.0	21,754	9211.0
Abstain / exhausted	58 0.2%	n/a	701 2.8%	n/a	1538 6.1%	n/a	3,605 14.2%	n/a

=== Federal elections ===
2025 Canadian federal election: South Surrey—White Rock
Party	Candidate	Votes	%	±%	Expenditures
Liberal	Ernie Klassen	33,094	50.50	+11.60	$103,687.08
Conservative	Kerry-Lynne Findlay	29,924	45.67	+3.23	$134,499.95
New Democratic	Jureun Park	1,634	2.49	–12.31	none listed
Green	Christine Kinnie	875	1.34	–	$4,957.34
Total valid votes/expense limit		65,527	99.44	–	$136,873.75
Total rejected ballots		368	0.56	–0.04	
Turnout		65,895	71.59	+6.75	
Eligible voters		92,041			
Liberal notional gain from Conservative		Swing		+4.19	
Source: Elections Canada

2021 Canadian federal election: South Surrey—White Rock
Party	Candidate	Votes	%	±%	Expenditures
Conservative	Kerry-Lynne Findlay	24,158	42.45	+0.56	$116,744.84
Liberal	Gordie Hogg	22,166	38.95	+1.57	$106,156.01
New Democratic	June Liu	8,395	14.75	+3.18	$5,597.59
People's	Gary Jensen	2,186	3.84	+2.37	$2,520.21
Total valid votes/expense limit		56,905	99.41	–	$116,892.25
Total rejected ballots		340	0.59	+0.04	
Turnout		57,245	64.84	–4.08	
Eligible voters		88,281			
Conservative hold		Swing		–0.51	
Source: Elections Canada

2019 Canadian federal election: South Surrey—White Rock
Party	Candidate	Votes	%	±%	Expenditures
Conservative	Kerry-Lynne Findlay	24,310	41.89	–0.39	$107,342.28
Liberal	Gordie Hogg	21,692	37.38	–9.99	$86,461.45
New Democratic	Stephen Crozier	6,716	11.57	+6.70	$16,252.90
Green	Beverly Pixie Hobby	4,458	7.68	+3.57	$6,434.86
People's	Joel Poulin	852	1.47	–	$5,942.36
Total valid votes/expense limit		58,028	99.44	–	$110,594.25
Total rejected ballots		326	0.56	+0.39	
Turnout		58,354	68.92	+30.78	
Eligible voters		84,664			
Conservative gain from Liberal		Swing		–	
Source: Elections Canada

Canadian federal by-election, December 11, 2017: South Surrey—White Rock Resignation of Dianne Watts
Party	Candidate	Votes	%	±%	Expenditures
Liberal	Gordie Hogg	14,369	47.37	+5.89	$88,736.12
Conservative	Kerry-Lynne Findlay	12,824	42.28	–1.75	$87,702.59
New Democratic	Jonathan Silveira	1,478	4.87	–5.54	$14,166.92
Green	Larry Colero	1,247	4.11	+0.69	$2,586.08
Christian Heritage	Rod Taylor	238	0.78	–	$9,833.08
Libertarian	Donald Wilson	89	0.29	–0.17	none listed
Progressive Canadian	Michael Huenefeld	86	0.28	+0.09	$508.36
Total valid votes/expense limit		30,331	99.83	–	$102,950.75
Total rejected ballots		52	0.17	–0.21	
Turnout		30,383	38.14	–35.85	
Eligible voters		79,653			
Liberal gain from Conservative		Swing		+3.82	
Source: Elections Canada

2015 Canadian federal election: Delta
Party	Candidate	Votes	%	±%	Expenditures
Liberal	Carla Qualtrough	27,355	49.12	+30.55	$72,634.16
Conservative	Kerry-Lynne Findlay	18,255	32.78	–15.17	$174,408.46
New Democratic	Jeremy Leveque	8,311	14.92	–13.13	$59,352.24
Green	Anthony Edward Devellano	1,768	3.17	–1.57	none listed
Total valid votes/expense limit		55,689	100.00		$206,935.20
Total rejected ballots		200	0.36	–	
Turnout		55,889	74.47	–	
Eligible voters		75,044			
Liberal notional gain from Conservative		Swing		+22.86	
Source: Elections Canada

2011 Canadian federal election: Delta—Richmond East
Party	Candidate	Votes	%	±%	Expenditures
Conservative	Kerry-Lynne Findlay	26,059	54.24	–1.51	$60,053.98
New Democratic	Nic Slater	11,181	23.27	+8.83	$6,028.08
Liberal	Alan Beesley	8,112	16.88	–5.14	$17,933.82
Green	Duane Laird	2,324	4.84	–2.94	none listed
Independent	John Shavluk	220	0.46	–	$852.60
Libertarian	Jeff Monds	147	0.31	–	none listed
Total valid votes/expense limit		48,043	99.65	–	$87,887.30
Total rejected ballots		168	0.35	–0.03	
Turnout		48,211	59.65	–0.41	
Eligible voters		80,821			
Conservative hold		Swing		+3.33	
Source: Elections Canada

2000 Canadian federal election: Vancouver Quadra
Party	Candidate	Votes	%	±%	Expenditures
Liberal	Stephen Owen	22,253	44.84	+2.69	$60,542
Alliance	Kerry-Lynne Findlay	18,613	37.50	+9.91	$64,240
Progressive Conservative	Bill Clarke	4,112	8.28	–8.59	$12,355
New Democratic	Loretta Woodcock	2,595	5.23	–4.80	$10,844
Green	Doug Warkentin	1,434	2.89	+0.31	$16,556
Canadian Action	Chris Shaw	390	0.79	–	$5,683
Natural Law	Steven R. Beck	126	0.25	–0.22	none listed
Marxist–Leninist	Anne Jamieson	109	0.22	–0.08	$18
Total valid votes		49,632	99.61		
Total rejected ballots		194	0.39	–0.06	
Turnout		49,826	63.34	–4.42	
Eligible voters		78,664			
Liberal hold		Swing		–3.61	
Change for the Canadian Alliance is based on the Reform Party.
Source: Elections Canada
