= Abbotsford-Mission =

Provincial electoral district in British Columbia, Canada

British Columbia electoral district
- Interactive map of riding boundaries

Provincial electoral district
- Legislature: Legislative Assembly of British Columbia
MLA
Darryl Kropp
Conservative
- District created: 2008
- First contested: 2009
- Last contested: 2026

Demographics
- Population (2021): 59,296
- Area (km²): 88
- Pop. density (per km²): 673.8
- Census division: Fraser Valley
- Census subdivision(s): Abbotsford, Mission

Abbotsford-Mission is a provincial electoral district in British Columbia that has been represented in the Legislative Assembly of British Columbia since 2009.

Created under the 2008 British Columbia electoral redistribution, the riding was first contested in the 2009 general election. It was created from parts of Abbotsford-Clayburn, Chilliwack-Sumas and Maple Ridge-Mission.

== Demographics ==
Population, 2021	59,296
Area (km^{2})	88
Pop. density (people per km^{2})	673
Source: BC Electoral Boundaries Commission

== Geography ==
Straddling the Fraser River, the electoral district comprises parts of northeastern Abbotsford, including Clayburn and Ridgedale, as well as the city of Mission, encompassing its core and Hatzic.

== Members of the Legislative Assembly ==
This riding has elected the following members of the Legislative Assembly:

Assembly	Years	Member	Party
Abbotsford-Mission; Riding created from Maple Ridge-Mission, Abbotsford-Clayburn and Chilliwack-Sumas
39th	2009–2013	Randy Hawes	Liberal
40th	2013–2017	Simon Gibson	Liberal
41st	2017–2020	Simon Gibson	Liberal
42nd	2020–2024	Pam Alexis	New Democratic
43rd	2024–2026	Reann Gasper	Conservative
44th	2026–present	Darryl Kropp	Conservative

== Electoral history ==
=== 2023 Representation Order ===
2026 British Columbia general election
** Preliminary results — Not yet official **
Party	Candidate	Votes	%	±%
Conservative	Darryl Kropp	11,848	56.7	
New Democratic	Pam Alexis	7,489	35.8	
CentreBC	Lakhwinder Jhaj	735	3.5	–
OneBC	Virender Dass	534	2.6	–
Libertarian	Jeff Monds	299	1.4	–
Total valid votes				
Total rejected ballots				
Turnout				
Registered voters		TBA		
Conservative hold		Swing		
Source: Elections BC

Cancelled 2026 by-election Scheduled for September 26, 2026 due to the resignation of Reann Gasper
Party	Candidate
Conservative	Kerry-Lynne Findlay
New Democratic	Pam Alexis
Green	Stephen Fowler
CentreBC	Lakhwinder Jhaj
Libertarian	Jeff Monds
The by-election was cancelled due to the dissolution of the Legislature on September 22, 2026.

2024 British Columbia general election
Party	Candidate	Votes	%	±%	Expenditures
Conservative	Reann Gasper	13,523	55.38	+49.8	$49,054.04
New Democratic	Pam Alexis	10,894	44.62	−1.8	$46,363.45
Total valid votes/expenses limit		24,417	99.60	–	$71,700.08
Total rejected ballots		98	0.40	–	
Turnout		24,515	57.42	–	
Registered voters		42,692			
Conservative notional gain from New Democratic		Swing		+25.8	
Source: Elections BC

2020 provincial election redistributed results
Party	%
New Democratic	46.4
Liberal	35.3
Green	10.9
Conservative	5.6
Christian Heritage	1.8

=== 2015 Representation Order ===
2020 British Columbia general election
Party	Candidate	Votes	%	±%	Expenditures
New Democratic	Pam Alexis	10,364	41.07	+11.90	$22,050.17
Liberal	Simon Gibson	9,620	38.12	−13.07	$38,355.28
Green	Stephen Fowler	2,667	10.57	−6.51	$1,113.00
Conservative	Trevor Hamilton	1,989	7.88	–	$1,310.44
Christian Heritage	Aeriol Alderking	595	2.36	−0.20	$1,305.19
Total valid votes		25,235	99.40	–	
Total rejected ballots		152	0.60	+0.07	
Turnout		25,387	53.45	-5.76	
Registered voters		47,500			
New Democratic gain from Liberal		Swing		+12.48	
Source: Elections BC

2017 British Columbia general election
Party	Candidate	Votes	%	±%	Expenditures
Liberal	Simon Gibson	12,879	51.19	+0.52	$50,561
New Democratic	Andrew Murray Christie	7,339	29.17	+1.97	$284
Green	Jennifer Holmes	4,297	17.08	+8.01	$1,482
Christian Heritage	Dan Cameron	644	2.56	–	$466
Total valid votes		25,159	100.00		
Total rejected ballots		135	0.53		
Turnout		25,294	59.20		
Source: Elections BC

=== 2008 Representation Order ===
2013 British Columbia general election
Party	Candidate	Votes	%	±%	Expenditures
Liberal	Simon Gibson	10,417	50.67	−7.7	$61,719
New Democratic	Preet Rai	5,591	27.20	−5.37	$51,805
Conservative	Don Stahl	1,946	9.47	–	$5,271
Green	Aird Flavelle	1,865	9.07	+0.01	$3,377
Independent	Wendy Bales	415	2.02	–	$2,699
Independent	Roman Bojczuk	204	0.99	–	$2,547
Excalibur	Marcus Halliday	119	0.58	–	$310
Total valid votes		20,557	100.00		
Total rejected ballots		117	0.57		
Turnout		20,674	56.63		
Source: Elections BC

2009 British Columbia general election
Party	Candidate	Votes	%	Expenditures
Liberal	Randy Hawes	10,372	58.37	$98,340
New Democratic	Lynn Perrin	5,788	32.57	$5,514
Green	Bill Walsh	1,611	9.06	$356
Total valid votes		17,771	100.00	
Total rejected ballots		160	0.89	
Turnout		17,930	52.10	

== See also ==
- List of British Columbia provincial electoral districts
- Canadian provincial electoral districts
