= Delta—Richmond East =

Former federal electoral district in British Columbia, Canada

British Columbia electoral district
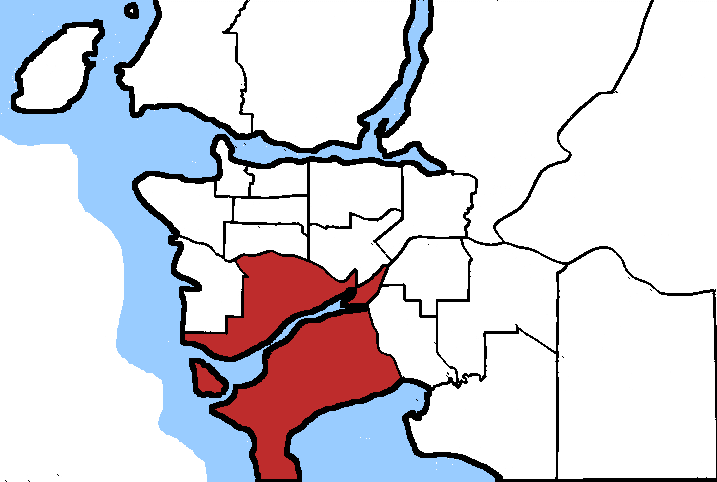
- Delta—Richmond East in relation to other federal electoral districts in Vancouver
- Coordinates: 49.128°N 123.048°W

Defunct federal electoral district
- Legislature: House of Commons
- District created: 2003
- District abolished: 2013
- First contested: 2004
- Last contested: 2011
- District webpage: profile, map

Demographics
- Population (2011): 111,411
- Electors (2011): 78,706
- Area (km²): 246.69
- Census subdivision(s): Richmond, Delta

Delta—Richmond East was a federal electoral district in the province of British Columbia, Canada, that was represented in the House of Commons of Canada from 2004 until 2013.

== Geography ==
It was located in the Metro Vancouver, and consisted of:

- the south east part of the City of Richmond,
- the village of Steveston in Richmond,
- the west part of the Corporation of Delta,
- Musqueam Indian Reserve No. 4, and
- Tsawwassen Indian Reserve.

== Demographics ==
This riding's population was 38% immigrants, about 20% of which were Chinese-Canadian. The service sector, retail trade, construction, and manufacturing were the major sources of employment in this riding. The average family income was almost $90,000. Unemployment was around 4.8%.

== History ==
The electoral district was created in 2003 from Delta—South Richmond and Richmond ridings. It was dissolved in 2011 into Delta and Steveston—Richmond East.

== Members of Parliament ==
| Parliament | Years | Member | Party |
|---|---|---|---|
Delta—Richmond East; Riding created from Delta—South Richmond and Richmond
| 38th | 2004–2006 | John Cummins | Conservative |
| 39th | 2006–2008 | John Cummins | Conservative |
| 40th | 2008–2011 | John Cummins | Conservative |
| 41st | 2011–2015 | Kerry-Lynne Findlay | Conservative |
Riding dissolved into Delta and Steveston—Richmond East

== Election results ==
=== 2011 ===
2011 Canadian federal election
| Party | Candidate | Votes | % | ±% | Expenditures |
|---|---|---|---|---|---|
| Conservative | Kerry-Lynne Findlay | 26,059 | 54.24 | –1.51 | $60,053.98 |
| New Democratic | Nic Slater | 11,181 | 23.27 | +8.83 | $6,028.08 |
| Liberal | Alan Beesley | 8,112 | 16.88 | –5.14 | $17,933.82 |
| Green | Duane Laird | 2,324 | 4.84 | –2.94 | none listed |
| Independent | John Shavluk | 220 | 0.46 | – | $852.60 |
| Libertarian | Jeff Monds | 147 | 0.31 | – | none listed |
| Total valid votes/expense limit | | 48,043 | 99.65 | – | $87,887.30 |
| Total rejected ballots | | 168 | 0.35 | –0.03 | |
| Turnout | | 48,211 | 59.65 | –0.41 | |
| Eligible voters | | 80,821 | | | |
| Conservative hold | | Swing | | +3.33 | |
Source: Elections Canada

=== 2008 ===
2008 Canadian federal election
| Party | Candidate | Votes | % | ±% | Expenditures |
|---|---|---|---|---|---|
| Conservative | John Cummins | 26,252 | 55.75 | +7.31 | $30,638.24 |
| Liberal | Dana L. Miller | 10,371 | 22.02 | –9.85 | $15,611.38 |
| New Democratic | Szilvia Barna | 6,803 | 14.45 | –0.28 | $2,821.43 |
| Green | Matthew Laine | 3,663 | 7.78 | +2.82 | $308.81 |
| Total valid votes/expense limit | | 47,089 | 99.62 | – | $84,246.34 |
| Total rejected ballots | | 180 | 0.38 | +0.06 | |
| Turnout | | 47,269 | 60.06 | –4.07 | |
| Eligible voters | | 78,706 | | | |
| Conservative hold | | Swing | | +8.58 | |
Source: Elections Canada

=== 2006 ===
2006 Canadian federal election
| Party | Candidate | Votes | % | ±% | Expenditures |
|---|---|---|---|---|---|
| Conservative | John Cummins | 23,595 | 48.44 | +2.84 | $55,219.73 |
| Liberal | Patricia Whittaker | 15,527 | 31.88 | –1.33 | $25,728.68 |
| New Democratic | William Jonsson | 7,176 | 14.73 | +0.10 | $2,682.05 |
| Green | Jean-Philippe Laflamme | 2,414 | 4.96 | –1.61 | $4.00 |
| Total valid votes/expense limit | | 48,712 | 99.68 | – | $77,573.90 |
| Total rejected ballots | | 156 | 0.32 | –0.03 | |
| Turnout | | 48,868 | 64.13 | +0.16 | |
| Eligible voters | | 76,200 | | | |
| Conservative hold | | Swing | | +2.09 | |
Source: Elections Canada

=== 2004 ===
2004 Canadian federal election
| Party | Candidate | Votes | % | Expenditures |
|---|---|---|---|---|
| Conservative | John Cummins | 21,308 | 45.60 | $69,867.88 |
| Liberal | Shelley Leonhardt | 15,515 | 33.20 | $47,917.38 |
| New Democratic | Itrath Syed | 6,838 | 14.63 | $10,971.02 |
| Green | Dana L. Miller | 3,066 | 6.56 | $1,976.82 |
| Total valid votes/expense limit | | 46,727 | 99.65 | $74,301.05 |
| Total rejected ballots | | 163 | 0.35 | |
| Turnout | | 46,890 | 63.97 | |
| Eligible voters | | 73,297 | | |
Source: Elections Canada

== See also ==
- List of Canadian electoral districts
- Historical federal electoral districts of Canada
