= Pinnacle Playhouse =

Canadian theatre

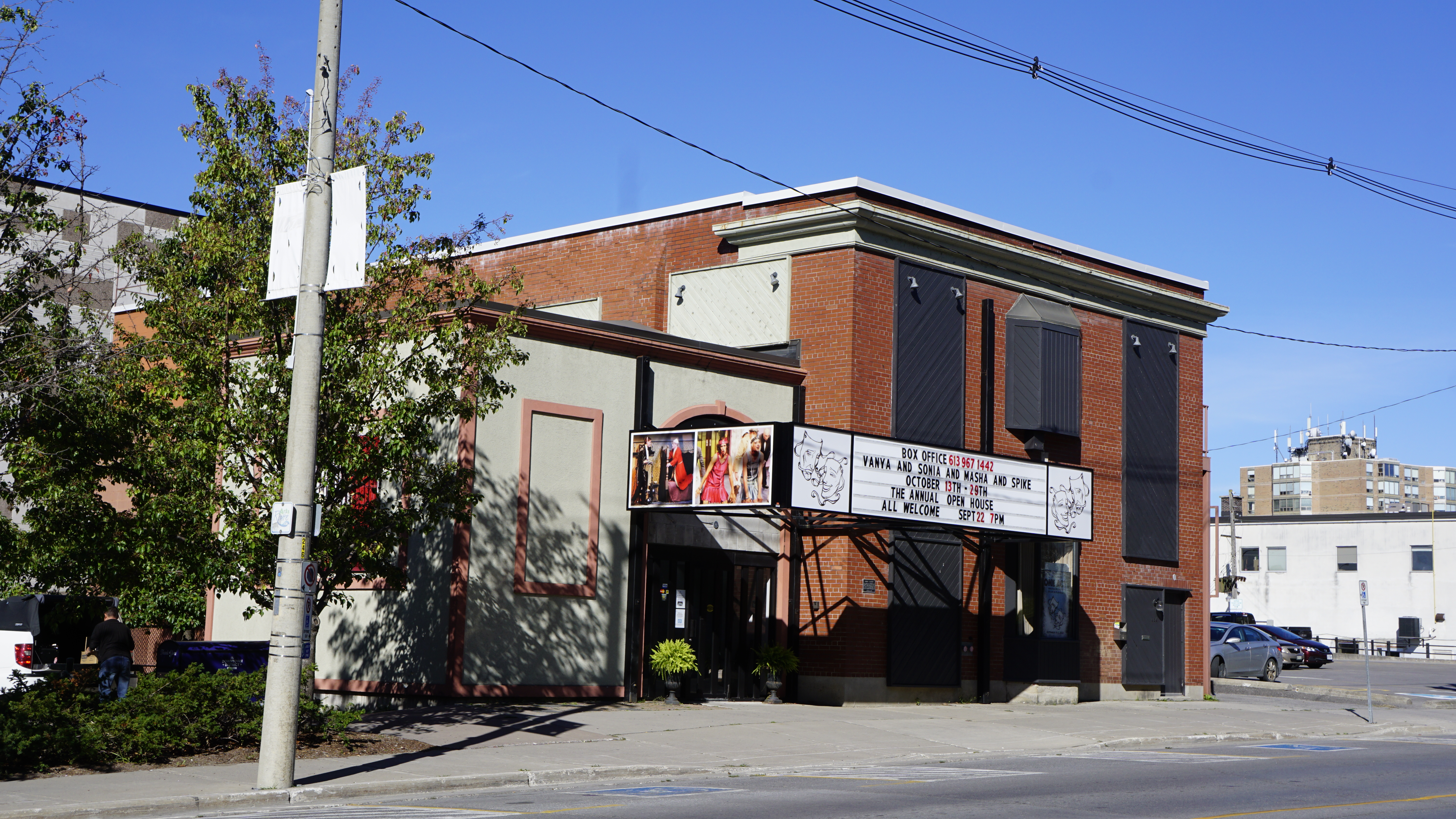
- Play House
- Interactive map of Pinnacle Playhouse
- Address: 256 Pinnacle Street; Belleville, Ontario; K8N 3B1
- Coordinates: 44.1656°N 77.3836°W
- Owner: City of Belleville
- Capacity: 154
- Type: Regional theatre
- Designation: Non-profit organization
- Current use: Community (amateur) theatre

Construction
- Opened: 1969
- Years active: 1969-present (BTG in other spaces: 1951-1969)

Website
- Belleville Theatre Guild

The Pinnacle Playhouse is a theatre in Belleville, Ontario, Canada. It houses the Belleville Theatre Guild, a member of the Eastern Ontario Drama League.

== History ==
In 1951, a group of friends gathered to read a play for pleasure. They enjoyed it so much they decided they would form a group and perform it. That fall, they met again at a tea room in downtown Belleville to plan a public meeting in the Corby Library for forming a theatre guild in Belleville.

The Voice of the People, a play by Robertson Davies, was one of the first one act plays performed. It went on to win the Eastern Ontario Drama League Festival and was invited to the Dominion Drama Festival in Saint John, New Brunswick, the next spring.

With the onset of television, the theatre struggled to stay alive with little money or location to operate from. Places were used that ranged from the third storey of a downtown building, to a donated room at the back of a building, to a vacant storefront. In 1969, the city of Belleville provided the guild with use of the D.L. Storey Building on Pinnacle Street, which was formerly a Salvation Army Citadel. The guild members were responsible for all operating costs of the building, including utilities, heat, repairs and maintenance, plus any renovations that are required. It was then renamed the Pinnacle Playhouse and it has been the source of its success ever since.

By the time the theatre celebrated its 50th anniversary in 2001, it had established itself as Belleville's primary (and at times only) hub for live theatre with early members including Jim Alexander, Liz Marshall and Steve Forrester. The latter served at BTG in a creative capacity for exactly 50 years.

Today the Belleville Theatre Guild, at Pinnacle Playhouse, puts on five shows annually. Each season culminates with a musical. In addition to their regular season they are a venue for the Belleville Doc Fest, Night Kitchen Too (a musical variety performance), and occasional screenings of silent films. Marianne Ackerman has held public readings of her in-progress works at the venue. Beginning in 2014, BTG began hosting local playwrights with an annual off-season show called the Evening of One-Acts. Playwrights whose short works have debuted here include Peter Paylor, Judie Preece, Maurice Leslie, Wayne Clark, Ian Feltham, Keith Taylor and Adri Boodoosingh.

Past productions from this theatre that have won Best Production from the EODL Full-Length Festival include Who's Afraid of Virginia Woolf in 1999, Talley's Folly in 2003, and Between Breaths in 2024.

== Administration ==
BTG's activities within Pinnacle Playhouse are managed by an 11-member board consisting of the following: President, Vice President, Past President, Secretary, Treasurer, Director of Production, Director of Programming, Director of Tech, Director of Public Relations, Director of Membership, Director of House.

Former board positions have included a Director of Box Office, which existed until a member serving in this position pointed out it was the Theatre Guild's only paid position and therefore constituted a conflict of interest. Apart from Box Office and the orchestras for musicals, non-profit membership has been maintained.

Each of the Board's directors is tasked with their own committee, which in some cases branches into sub-committees, to meet on a weekly or monthly basis and operate the theater's various departments.

== Renovations ==
The Playhouse has undergone many transformations, including the initial upgrade to a 126-seat theater with a revolving stage (which was removed in later renovations). In 1982 – 83 the Belleville Theatre Guild, with donations from subscribers, community groups and local and provincial governments, renovated the Playhouse to increase seating to 154 and to provide essential space both onstage and off.

In 2002, the Belleville Theatre Guild initiated its "Help Give Us A Lift" campaign to raise funds for an elevator addition, additional wing space, a new box office and a barrier-free washroom. A grant was given by the Ontario Trillium Foundation. The Guild's building fund, which had been saved for many years, provided the majority of remaining costs. The balance was raised through donations from businesses and individuals in the community. The most significant of these sponsors have their names engraved in the BTG Walk of Fame (on the sidewalk outside the theatre).

In the late 2010s, a mew marquee was installed which includes upscaled photos of three of BTG's past productions (A Christmas Carol in 2014; The Drowsy Chaperone in 2015; Little Shop of Horrors in 2017).

== Annex ==
The Guild also has a warehouse space called the Annex, which houses set pieces, props, costumes, a board room, a workroom for set builders and a rehearsal space for upcoming productions. Maintenance is a joint effort between BTG's various committees and a separate company who rents adjoining space in the warehouse.
