= Belleville, Ontario =

Belleville
- City (single-tier)
- City of Belleville
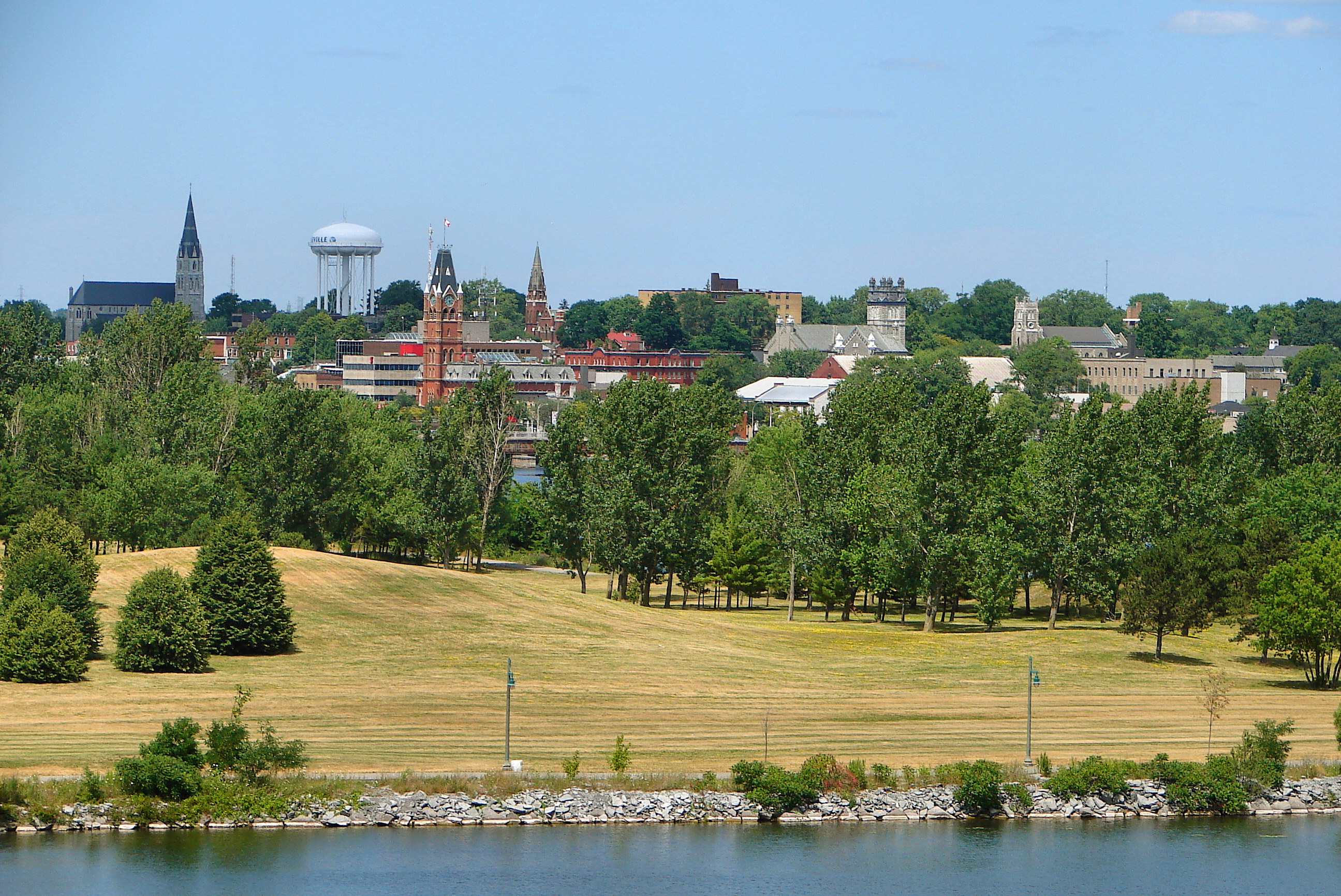
- Skyline of Downtown Belleville

- Logo
- Nicknames: Bellevegas; The Friendly City
- Motto: Loyalty Tradition Progress
- Location within Southern Ontario
- Coordinates: 44°10′N 77°23′W
- Country: Canada
- Province: Ontario
- County: Hastings
- Settled: 1789
- Named: 1816
- Incorporated: 1836 (as police village)
- Incorporated: 1878 (as city)

Government
  - Mayor: Paul Fleming
  - Governing Body: Belleville City Council
  - MPs: Chris Malette (LPC); Shelby Kramp-Neuman (CPC)
  - MPPs: Tyler Allsopp (PCPO); Ric Bresee (PCPO)

Area
  - Land: 247.15 km^{2} (95.43 sq mi)
  - Metro: 1,337.50 km^{2} (516.41 sq mi)

Population (2021)
  - Total: 55,071
  - Density: 222.8/km^{2} (577/sq mi)
  - Metro: 111,184
  - Metro density: 83.1/km^{2} (215/sq mi)

Gross Domestic Product
  - Belleville CMA: CA$5.1 billion (2020)
- Time zone: UTC−5 (EST)
  - Summer (DST): UTC−4 (EDT)
- Postal Code FSA: K8N, K8P, K8R
- Area codes: 613, 343, 753
- Website: www.city.belleville.on.ca

Belleville is a city in Ontario, Canada, situated on the eastern end of Lake Ontario, located at the mouth of the Moira River and on the Bay of Quinte. Its population as of the 2021 Canadian census was 55,071 (Census Metropolitan Area population 111,184). Belleville is the seat of Hastings County, but politically independent of it; it is also the centre of the Bay of Quinte Region.

== History ==
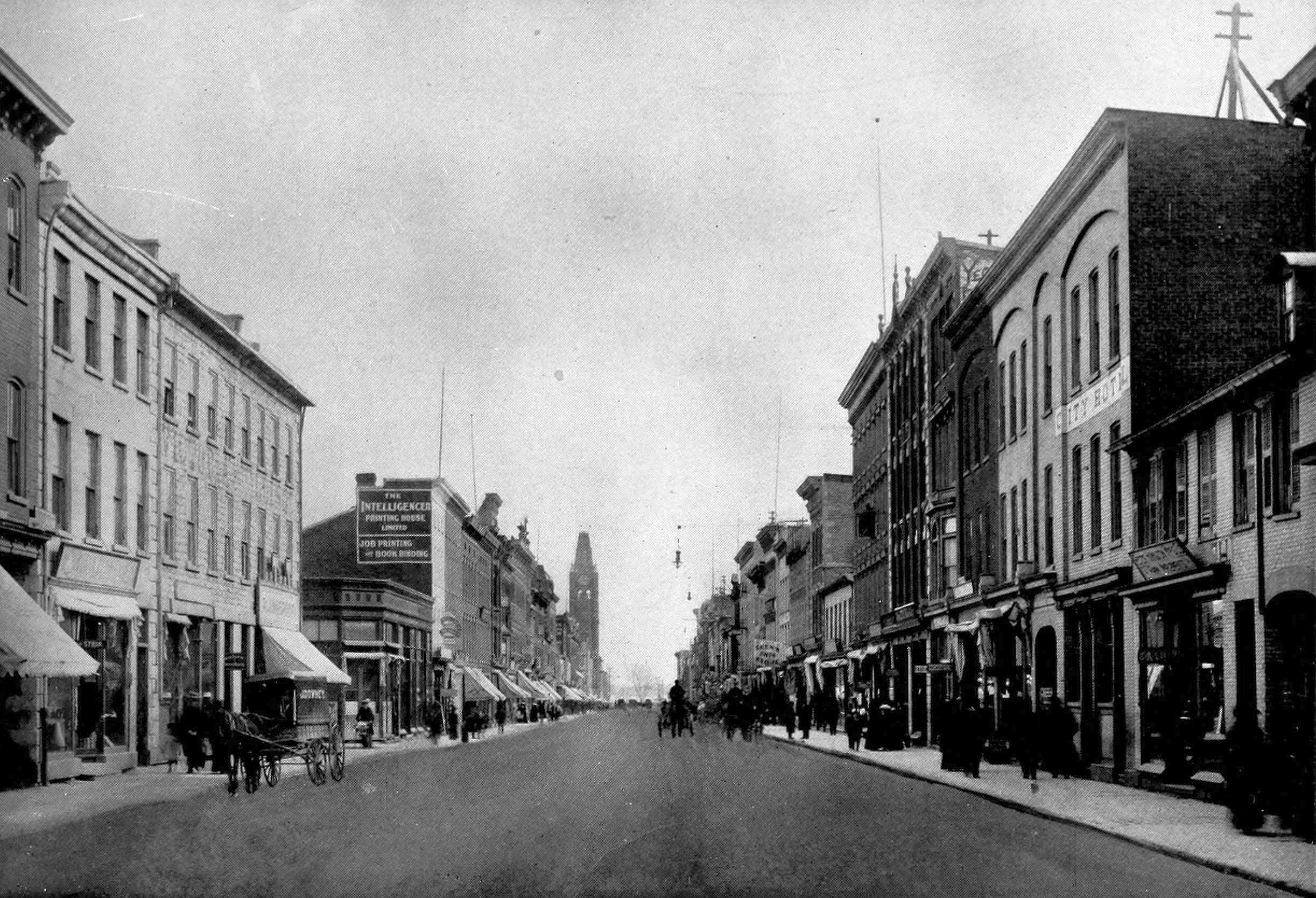
Front Street, 1900

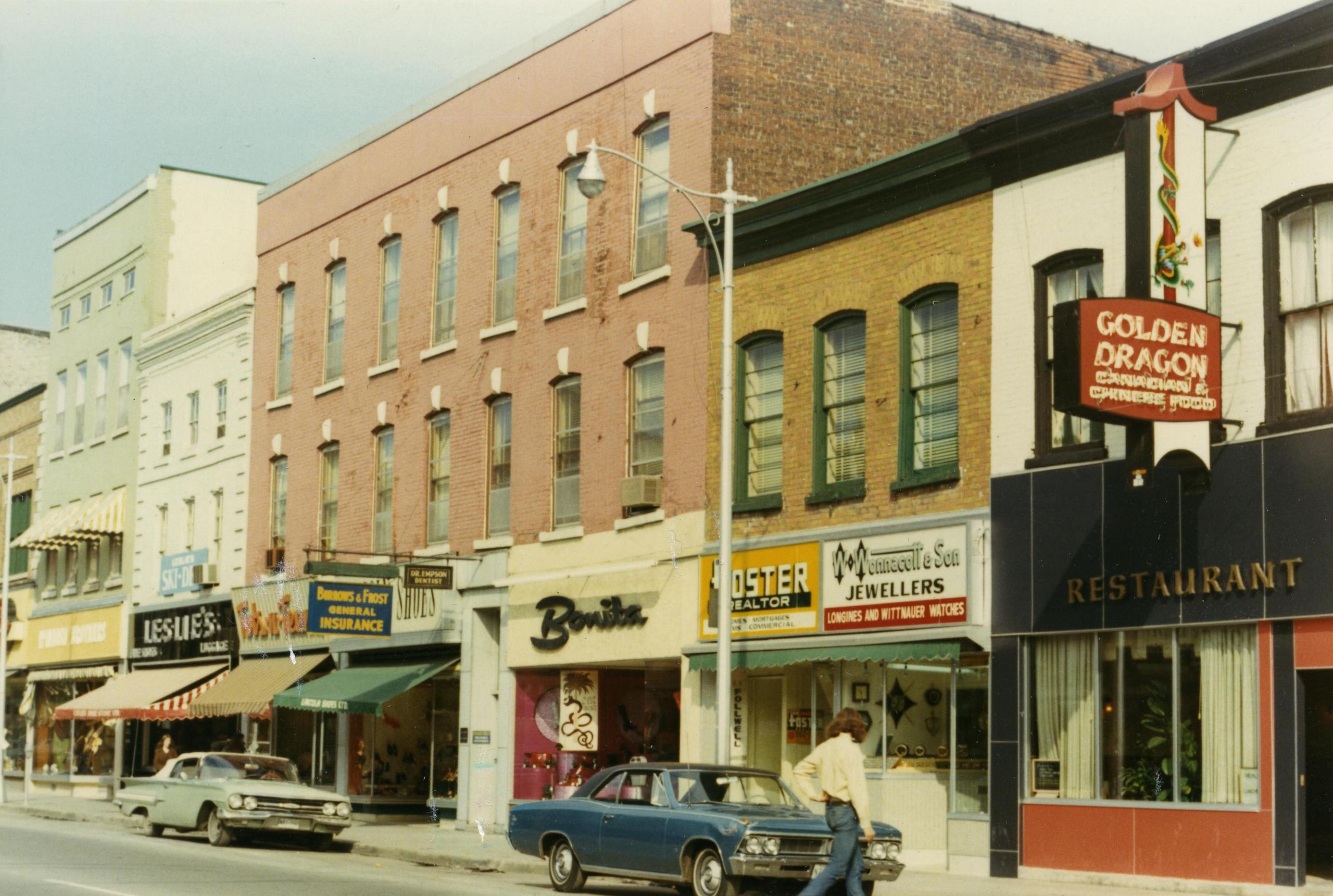
Front Street, 1972

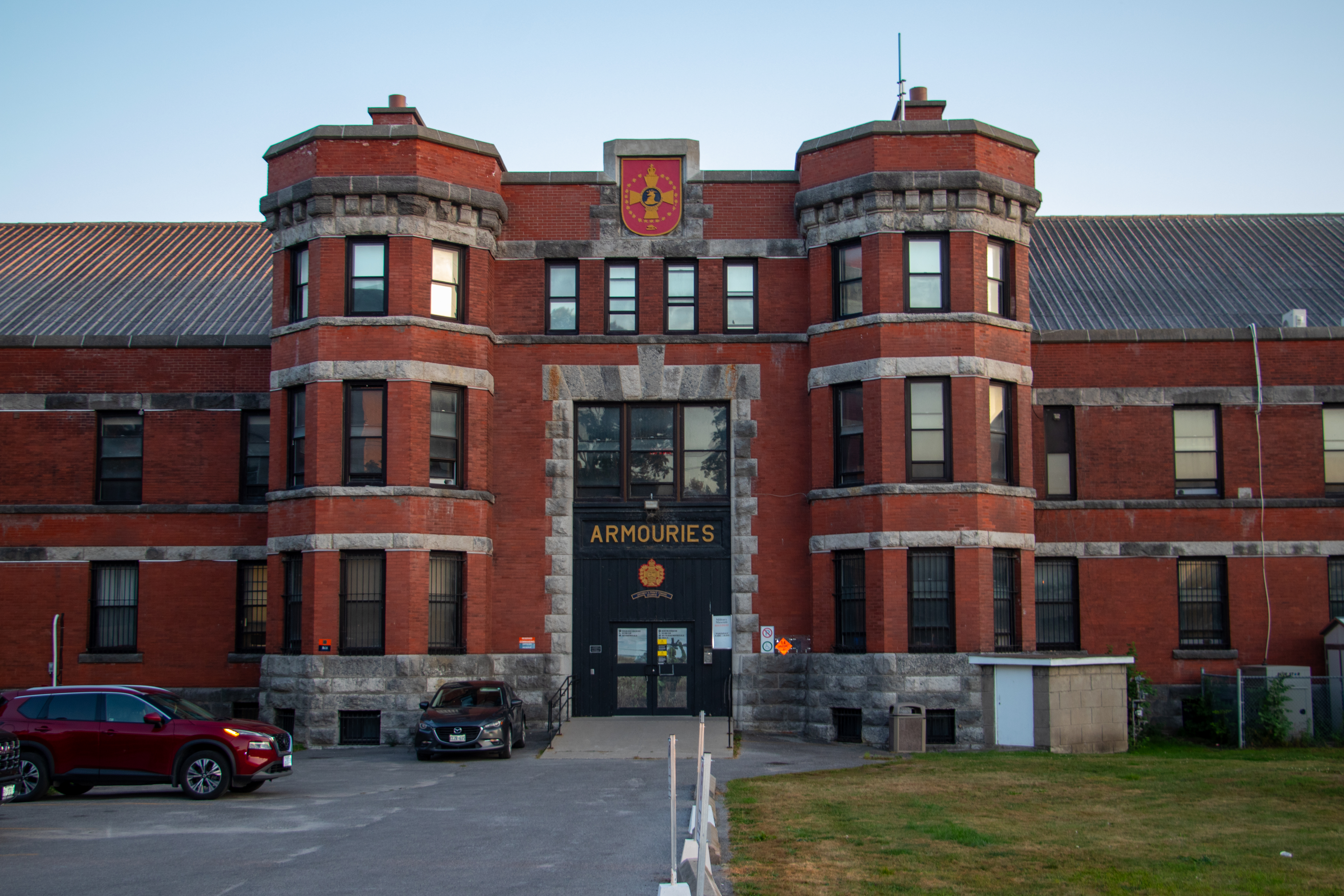
Belleville Armoury is a recognized Federal Heritage building, listed in 1992 on the Register of the Government of Canada Heritage Buildings.

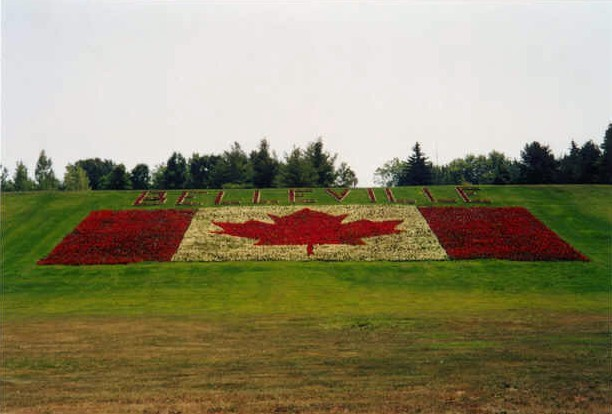
Flowerbed beside Highway 401 near Belleville

The settlement was first called Singleton's Creek after an early settler, George Singleton. Next it was called Meyer's Creek, after prominent settler and industrialist John Walden Meyers (1745–1821), one of the founders of Belleville. There he built a sawmill and grist mill. After an 1816 visit to the settlement by colonial administrator Sir Francis Gore and his wife, Lady Annabella Gore, it was renamed as Belleville in her honour.

Henry Corby, who arrived in 1832 with his new wife Alma Williams (they had married before immigrating), settled in Belleville. He was a merchant, setting up a grocery store and other businesses. He founded the H. Corby Distillery, and promoted the municipality. He also represented it in Parliament.

Their son Henry Corby Jr. (Harry) took over the family business and continued to support the town: he donated funding to create the public library, helped develop the park at Massassaga Point, established the Corby Charitable Fund, helped raise funds to build the first bridge across the Bay of Quinte and donated the land and development of Corby Park.

In 1836 Belleville became an incorporated village. By 1846, it had a population of 2040. Several stone buildings were soon constructed, including a jail and court house, as well as some of the seven churches. Transportation to other communities was by stagecoach and, in summer, by steamboat along the lake. Two weekly newspapers were published. The post office received mail daily. Several court and government offices were located here. In addition to tradesmen, there was some small industry, three cloth factories, a paper mill, two grist mills, three tanneries and two breweries. The seventeen taverns outnumbered the churches and most businesses. The oldest surviving residence within the original boundaries, 67 South Front Street, was built by Alexander Oliphant Petrie in 1814.

With the completion of the Grand Trunk Railway in 1856, Belleville became an important railway junction. Added to a booming trade in lumber and successful farming in the area, the railway helped increase the commercial and industrial growth. Belleville was incorporated as a town in 1850.

In 1858 the iron bridge was completed over the Moira River at Bridge Street; it was the first iron bridge in Hastings County. By 1865, the population reached 6,000. Telephone service to 29 subscribers was in place by 1883; electricity became available in 1885 and in 1886, the town began to offer municipal water service. In 1870, Ontario's first school for the deaf was established in Belleville. Under Dr. Charles B. Coughlin, the school was recognized as making a significant contribution to special education. Originally called the Ontario Institution for the Education of the Deaf and Dumb, the facility was renamed as Ontario School for the Deaf. In 1974, it was renamed as the Sir James Whitney School for the Deaf.

Belleville's city hall operates in a building first constructed in 1873 to house the public market and administrative offices. It was designed in the High Victorian Gothic style and retains much of its original appearance. In 1877, Belleville was legally incorporated as a city.

In 1998, the city was amalgamated with the surrounding Township of Thurlow to form an expanded City of Belleville as part of Ontario-wide municipal restructuring. The city also annexed portions of Quinte West to the west.

Late-20th-century franchises founded here include the Dixie Lee Fried Chicken chain in 1964 and, in 1978, Journey's End Corporation's economy, limited-service hotel chain.

In February 2024, the city declared a state of emergency after 23 people—clustered around a homeless shelter—overdosed on opioids within two days. The cause was "a laced drug in the region".

On September 20, 2026, a police officer was injured in a shooting outside the Sons of Jacob Synagogue while members of the Jewish community gathered for Yom Kippur. The alleged perpetrator died in hospital after a shootout with police. Ontario's Special Investigations Unit, an independent civilian law enforcement agency, investigated the incident. Ontario Premier Doug Ford condemned the shooting and expressed support for the wounded officer and other first responders.

== Geography ==
Belleville is located at the mouth of the Moira River on the Bay of Quinte in southeastern Ontario between the cities of Quinte West to the west and Napanee to the east. These cities are connected by both Ontario's Highway 2 and the Macdonald-Cartier Freeway (Highway 401); The city is also served by Highway 37, running north–south from Belleville towards Tweed to the east of the Moira River; and Highway 62 (once Highway 14 south of 401), northwards towards Madoc, and southward to Prince Edward County over the Bay Bridge.

Officially, Belleville is properly considered part of the Central Ontario region as it is located west of the St. Lawrence River's starting point, but the city is popularly considered part of Eastern Ontario as it shares the eastern region's area code 613 and K postal code.

=== Climate ===
Belleville's climate has four distinct seasons. The city's traditional humid continental climate (Dfb) (hot summers, cold winters) is moderated by its location near Lake Ontario. The lake moderates temperature extremes, cooling hot summer days and warming cold days during the fall and winter. Because of this, winter snowfall is somewhat limited due to the increased frequency of precipitation falling as rain during the winter months. In the summer months, severe thunderstorm activity is usually limited because of the non-favourable lake breeze conditions. The city, being located on the north shore of Lake Ontario, is also in an unfavourable location for lake effect snow. One notable exception, however, was in December 2010 when 14 cm of snow occurred in one day as a result of a snow band from Lake Ontario. The summer months do not typically experience exceedingly hot temperatures, however, humidity levels can make daytime highs uncomfortable. Summer rainfall is usually modest and delivered by passing thunderstorms or warm fronts. Remnants of tropical systems do pass through on occasion towards summer's end, resulting in one or two days of consistently wet weather. The winter season is highly variable, with the record setting winter of 2007–08 experiencing near 270 cm of snow. Four years later, the winter of 2011–12 experienced only 60 cm of snow. Winter temperatures are also highly variable, even in one season. Air masses change frequently, and while a few days may see above freezing temperatures at a time in January, the next week may bring cold and snowfall. Autumn is usually mild, with an increase in precipitation starting in late September as conditions for fall storms develop. The highest temperature ever recorded in Belleville was 104 °F (40.0 °C) on 9 July 1936. The coldest temperature ever recorded was −39 °F (−39.4 °C) on 9 February 1934.

Climate data for Belleville, 1981−2010 normals, extremes 1866−present
Month	Jan	Feb	Mar	Apr	May	Jun	Jul	Aug	Sep	Oct	Nov	Dec	Year
Record high °C (°F)	14.5 (58.1)	13.0 (55.4)	23.0 (73.4)	29.0 (84.2)	35.0 (95.0)	35.6 (96.1)	40.0 (104.0)	36.1 (97.0)	35.0 (95.0)	28.3 (82.9)	22.2 (72.0)	16.5 (61.7)	40.0 (104.0)
Mean daily maximum °C (°F)	−2.2 (28.0)	−0.5 (31.1)	4.1 (39.4)	11.7 (53.1)	18.7 (65.7)	23.9 (75.0)	26.8 (80.2)	25.7 (78.3)	21.0 (69.8)	13.7 (56.7)	7.2 (45.0)	1.2 (34.2)	12.6 (54.7)
Daily mean °C (°F)	−6.7 (19.9)	−5.1 (22.8)	−0.4 (31.3)	7.0 (44.6)	13.7 (56.7)	19.0 (66.2)	21.8 (71.2)	20.8 (69.4)	16.3 (61.3)	9.5 (49.1)	3.6 (38.5)	−2.6 (27.3)	8.1 (46.6)
Mean daily minimum °C (°F)	−11.1 (12.0)	−9.7 (14.5)	−5 (23)	2.3 (36.1)	8.7 (47.7)	14.0 (57.2)	16.9 (62.4)	15.9 (60.6)	11.7 (53.1)	5.3 (41.5)	0.1 (32.2)	−6.3 (20.7)	3.6 (38.5)
Record low °C (°F)	−37.8 (−36.0)	−39.4 (−38.9)	−29.4 (−20.9)	−17.2 (1.0)	−7.2 (19.0)	0.0 (32.0)	6.1 (43.0)	3.3 (37.9)	−1.7 (28.9)	−10 (14)	−22.2 (−8.0)	−34.4 (−29.9)	−39.4 (−38.9)
Average precipitation mm (inches)	67.3 (2.65)	58.1 (2.29)	62.4 (2.46)	75.8 (2.98)	81.3 (3.20)	74.5 (2.93)	65.1 (2.56)	75.5 (2.97)	91.9 (3.62)	85.2 (3.35)	95.7 (3.77)	79.1 (3.11)	911.6 (35.89)
Average rainfall mm (inches)	30.6 (1.20)	29.4 (1.16)	40.3 (1.59)	69.2 (2.72)	81.2 (3.20)	74.5 (2.93)	65.1 (2.56)	75.5 (2.97)	91.9 (3.62)	84.9 (3.34)	84.7 (3.33)	44.6 (1.76)	771.9 (30.39)
Average snowfall cm (inches)	36.8 (14.5)	28.6 (11.3)	22.1 (8.7)	6.5 (2.6)	0.0 (0.0)	0.0 (0.0)	0.0 (0.0)	0.0 (0.0)	0.0 (0.0)	0.2 (0.1)	11.0 (4.3)	34.5 (13.6)	139.7 (55.0)
Average precipitation days (≥ 0.2 mm)	15.4	11.8	12.0	12.2	12.4	11.6	9.7	10.5	11.3	13.5	14.0	14.2	148.6
Average rainy days (≥ 0.2 mm)	5.3	4.9	7.4	11.0	12.3	11.6	9.7	10.5	11.3	13.4	11.4	7.5	116.2
Average snowy days (≥ 0.2 cm)	11.7	8.5	6.4	2.1	0.04	0.0	0.0	0.0	0.0	0.12	3.7	8.8	41.2
Source: Environment Canada

== Demographics ==
The 2021 Census by Statistics Canada found that Belleville had a population of 55,071 living in 23,536 of its 24,582 total private dwellings, a change of 8.6% from its 2016 population of 50,716. With a land area of 247.15 km^{2} (95.43 sq mi), it had a population density of 222.8/km^{2} (577.1/sq mi) in 2021.

At the census metropolitan area (CMA) level in the 2021 census, the Belleville - Quinte West CMA had a population of 111,184 living in 46,213 of its 48,274 total private dwellings, a change of 7.5% from its 2016 population of 103,401. With a land area of 1,337.5 km^{2} (516.4 sq mi), it had a population density of 83.1/km^{2} (215.3/sq mi) in 2021.

Historical census populations – Belleville, Ontario

Year	Pop.	±%
1841	2,040	—
1851	4,593	+125.1%
1871	7,305	+59.0%
1881	9,516	+30.3%
1891	9,916	+4.2%
1901	9,117	−8.1%
1911	9,876	+8.3%

Year	Pop.	±%
1921	12,206	+23.6%
1931	13,790	+13.0%
1941	15,498	+12.4%
1951	19,519	+25.9%
1961	30,655	+57.1%
1971	35,128	+14.6%
1981	34,881	−0.7%

Year	Pop.	±%
1991	37,243	+6.8%
1996	37,083	−0.4%
2001	45,986	+24.0%
2006	48,821	+6.2%
2011	49,454	+1.3%
2016	50,716	+2.6%
2021	55,071	+8.6%

Population counts are not adjusted for boundary changes.
Source: Statistics Canada

=== Ethnicity ===
Belleville's population is mostly of European descent. The racial make up of Belleville as of 2021 was 85.1% White, 5.6% Indigenous and 9.3% visible minorities. The largest visible minority groups in Belleville are South Asian (3.9%), Black (1.3%), Filipino (0.9%) and Chinese (0.8%).

Panethnic groups in the City of Belleville (2001−2021)
Panethnic group	2021		2016		2011		2006		2001	
Panethnic group	Pop.	%	Pop.	%	Pop.	%	Pop.	%	Pop.	%
European (Note: Statistic includes all persons that did not make up part of a visible minority or an indigenous identity.)	45,770	85.09%	44,085	89.34%	43,650	90.74%	43,935	91.77%	42,410	93.92%
Indigenous	3,030	5.63%	2,485	5.04%	2,110	4.39%	1,385	2.89%	1,065	2.36%
South Asian	2,090	3.89%	720	1.46%	645	1.34%	510	1.07%	400	0.89%
African	705	1.31%	480	0.97%	450	0.94%	435	0.91%	200	0.44%
Southeast Asian (Note: Statistic includes total responses of "Filipino" and "Southeast Asian" under visible minority section on census.)	680	1.26%	440	0.89%	280	0.58%	335	0.7%	245	0.54%
East Asian (Note: Statistic includes total responses of "Chinese", "Korean", and "Japanese" under visible minority section on census.)	650	1.21%	485	0.98%	485	1.01%	780	1.63%	500	1.11%
Latin American	435	0.81%	220	0.45%	185	0.38%	255	0.53%	135	0.3%
Middle Eastern (Note: Statistic includes total responses of "West Asian" and "Arab" under visible minority section on census.)	175	0.33%	185	0.37%	180	0.37%	90	0.19%	165	0.37%
Other/multiracial (Note: Statistic includes total responses of "Visible minority, n.i.e." and "Multiple visible minorities" under visible minority section on census.)	270	0.5%	250	0.51%	135	0.28%	160	0.33%	70	0.16%
Total responses	53,790	97.67%	49,345	97.3%	48,105	97.27%	47,875	98.06%	45,155	98.1%
Total population	55,071	100%	50,716	100%	49,454	100%	48,821	100%	46,029	100%
Note: Totals greater than 100% due to multiple origin responses

Ethnic and Cultural origins (2021)	Population	Percent
English	16,515	30.7%
Irish	15,155	28.2%
Scottish	12,005	22.3%
Canadian	9,620	17.9%
French n.o.s	5,610	10.4%
German	5,220	9.7%
Dutch	3,180	5.9%
Caucasian (White) n.o.s+ European n.o.s	2,370	4.4%
British Isles n.o.s	2,225	4.1%
Italian	1,920	3.6%
First Nations (North American Indian) n.o.s.+ North American Indigenous, n.o.s.	1,595	3.0%
Indian (India)	1,430	2.7%
Welsh	1,265	2.4%
Polish	1,255	2.3%
Note: a person may report more than one ethnic origin.

=== Language ===
89.7% of residents speak English as their mother tongue as of 2021. Other common first languages are French (1.5%), Gujarati (0.7%), Punjabi (0.6%), Spanish (0.5%), and Chinese (0.5%). 1.1% list both English and a non-official language as mother tongues, while 0.4% list both English and French.

=== Religion ===
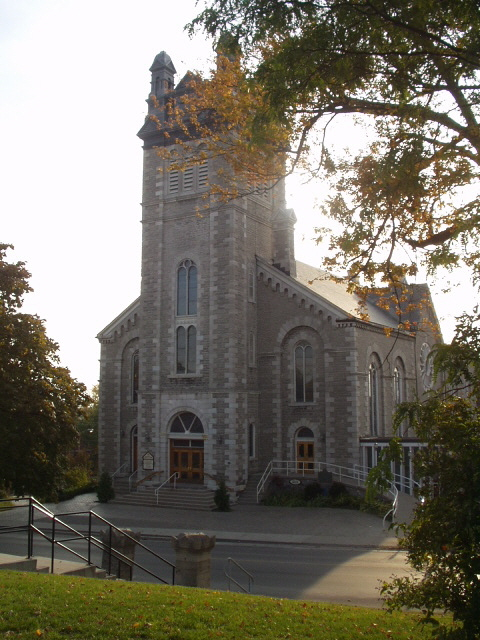
Bridge Street United Church

Largest non-Christian religion in Belleville - Quinte West CMA by census tract based on the 2021 census

As of 2021, 53.4% of residents were Christian, down from 67.1% in 2011. 22.7% were Protestant, 19.8% Catholic, 6.0% Christians not otherwise specified, and 4.9% members of other Christian denominations or Christian-related traditions. 42.1% were non-religious or secular, up from 30.3% in 2011. The remaining 4.5% affiliated with another religion, up from 2.6% in 2011. The largest non-Christian religions were Hinduism (1.4%), Sikhism (1.0%) and Islam (0.8%).

== Economy ==
Some corporations operating in Belleville include the following:

- Procter & Gamble
- Kellogg's

Belleville is home to two shopping malls: The Bay View Mall in east-end Belleville and the Quinte Mall along Bell Boulevard (south of Highway 401) in North Belleville. In January 2017 a Shorelines Casino opened on Bell Boulevard.

== Arts and culture ==
=== Theatre ===
- Pinnacle Playhouse
- Theatre in the Wings
- The Empire Theatre
- Moonpath Productions
- Quinte Ballet School of Canada

== Sports ==
The Belleville Senators play in the American Hockey League (AHL) and began play in the 2017–18 season as the top minor league affiliate of the National Hockey League's Ottawa Senators. They play at the CAA Arena, formally Yardmen Arena, located on 265 Cannifton Road.

Belleville Bulls played in the Ontario Hockey League from 1981 to 2015. The team was then sold and relocated to Hamilton, Ontario. Belleville was also previously home to two senior hockey teams, the Belleville Macs and the Belleville McFarlands. Belleville is also home the Bay of Quinte Yacht Club, which challenged for the America's Cup in 1881. Belleville also sports minor hockey league teams such as the Belleville Bearcats (female) and the Belleville Jr. Bulls (male).

The Belleville McFarlands were a men's senior ice hockey team in the Ontario Hockey Association Senior division from 1956 to 1961. The McFarlands were Allan Cup champions in 1958, defeating the Kelowna Packers four games to three, and the World Championship in 1959. The team name was revived by a later team in the Eastern Ontario Senior Hockey League from 2003 to 2006, known as the Belleville Macs.

Shannonville Motorsport Park has hosted rounds of the Canadian Touring Car Championship, the Canadian Superbike Championship and the CASC Ontario Region championships.

== Government ==
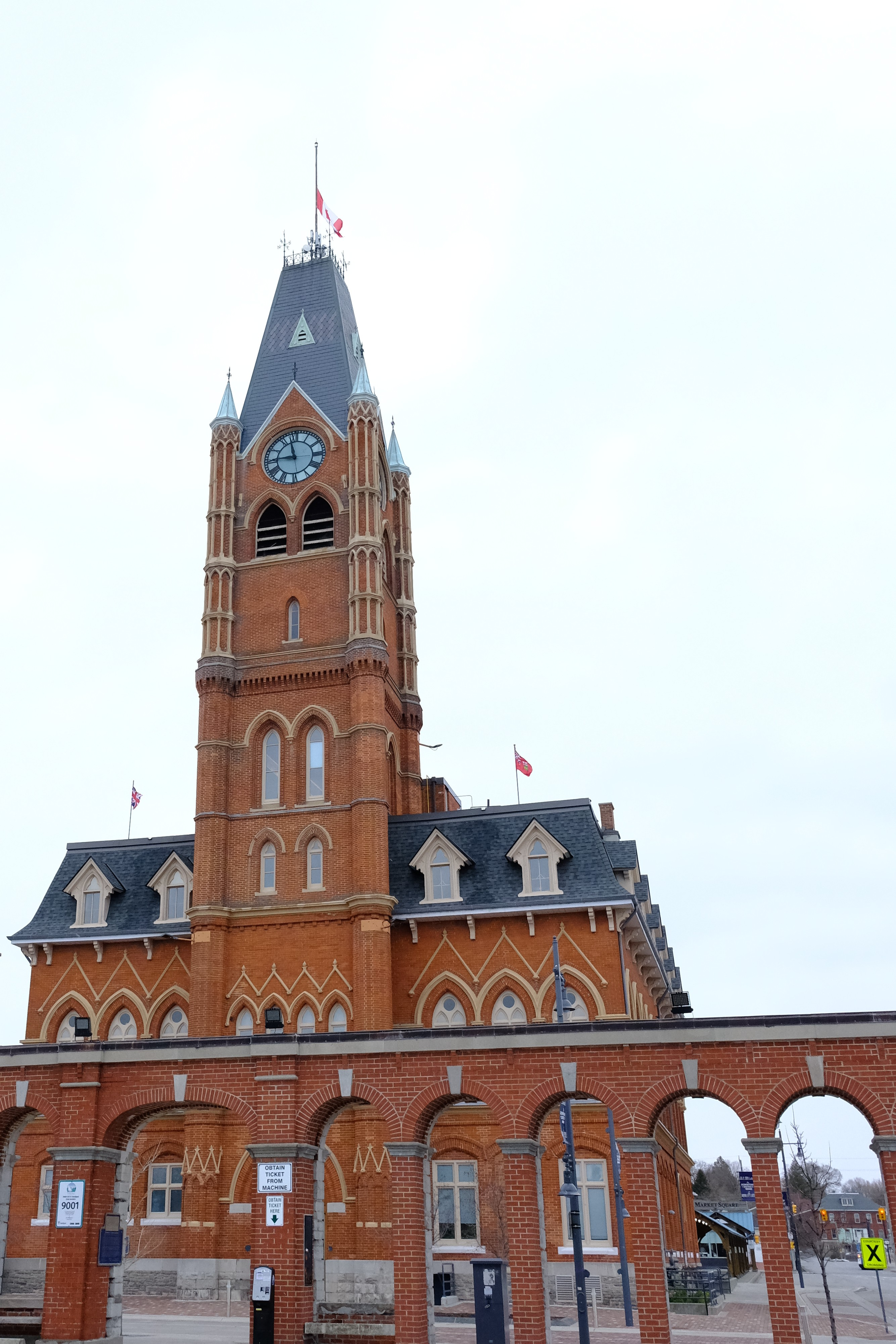
Belleville City Hall, built in 1873

Local government is represented by Belleville City Council with a mayor and eight councillors. There are two city wards with Ward 1 (Belleville) represented by six councillors and Ward 2 (Thurlow) by two councillors. Ward 1 consists of the historic city and Ward 2 was created in 1998 with the amalgamation of Township of Thurlow. City Council sits at Belleville City Hall.

=== Police Service ===
The city has had its own police force since 1834, and constables since 1790. The force has about 100 sworn members headed by a Chief of Police and a Deputy Chief. The service is stationed out of one location only. Policing on provincial highways (37, 62 and 401) are provided by the Ontario Provincial Police from the Centre Hastings detachment.

=== Canadian Forces ===
The Hastings and Prince Edward Regiment continues to be a presence in the city. The regimental headquarters and one company (A Company, Assoro Company) are at 187 Pinnacle Street. The Hastings and Prince Edward Regiment museum is located at their armouries.

== Infrastructure ==
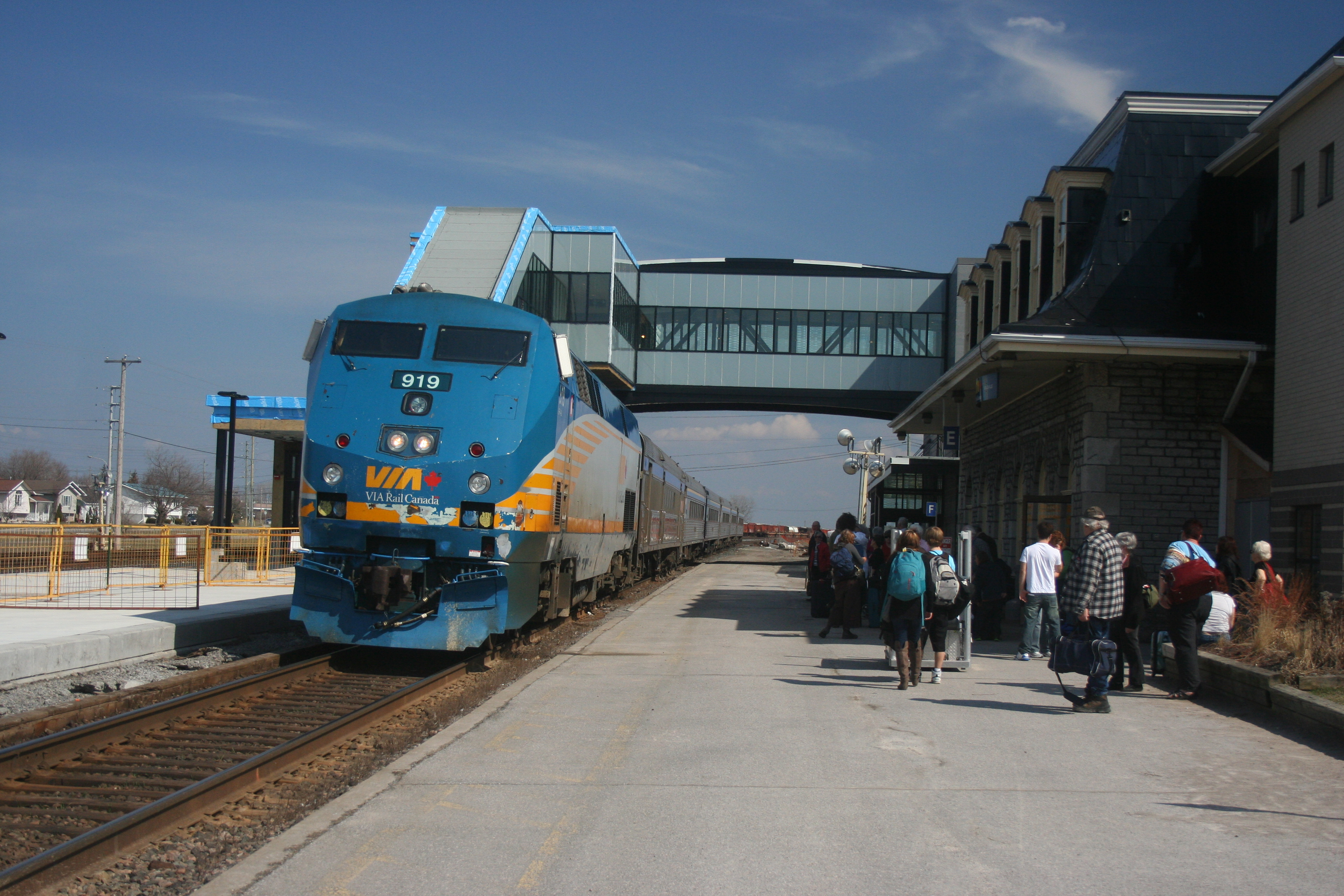
A VIA Rail train arrives at Belleville station (2012)

=== Roads ===
Belleville is serviced by Highway 401 And other routes such as

- Highway 62
- Highway 37/Cannifton Road Parkway
- Highway 2/Dundas Street.
- Bell Boulevard/Adam Street
- College Street/Airport Parkway

=== Public Transit ===
Public transport is provided by Belleville Transit, which operates 7 days a week, with 8 routes serving the urban area of the City. The fleet consists of 17 coaches travelling approximately 2,300 kilometers per day and carry 3,000 riders per day.

Bus service to and from Toronto Pearson International Airport is provided by Megabus.

Deseronto Transit provides public transportation services to destinations including Deseronto, Napanee, and Prince Edward County.

=== Rail ===
Belleville is located on the Toronto-Montreal main rail lines for both Canadian National Railway and Canadian Pacific Railway; both companies provide freight access. VIA Rail also operates five daily passenger services each way along its Quebec City–Windsor Corridor.

=== Hospital ===
Belleville General Hospital is located near Highway 2 and is Belleville's main healthcare facility. The hospital is one of the four hospitals in the region under Quinte Health Care. The corporate headquarters of Quinte Health Care is located in the Belleville location.

== Education ==
=== Post-secondary ===
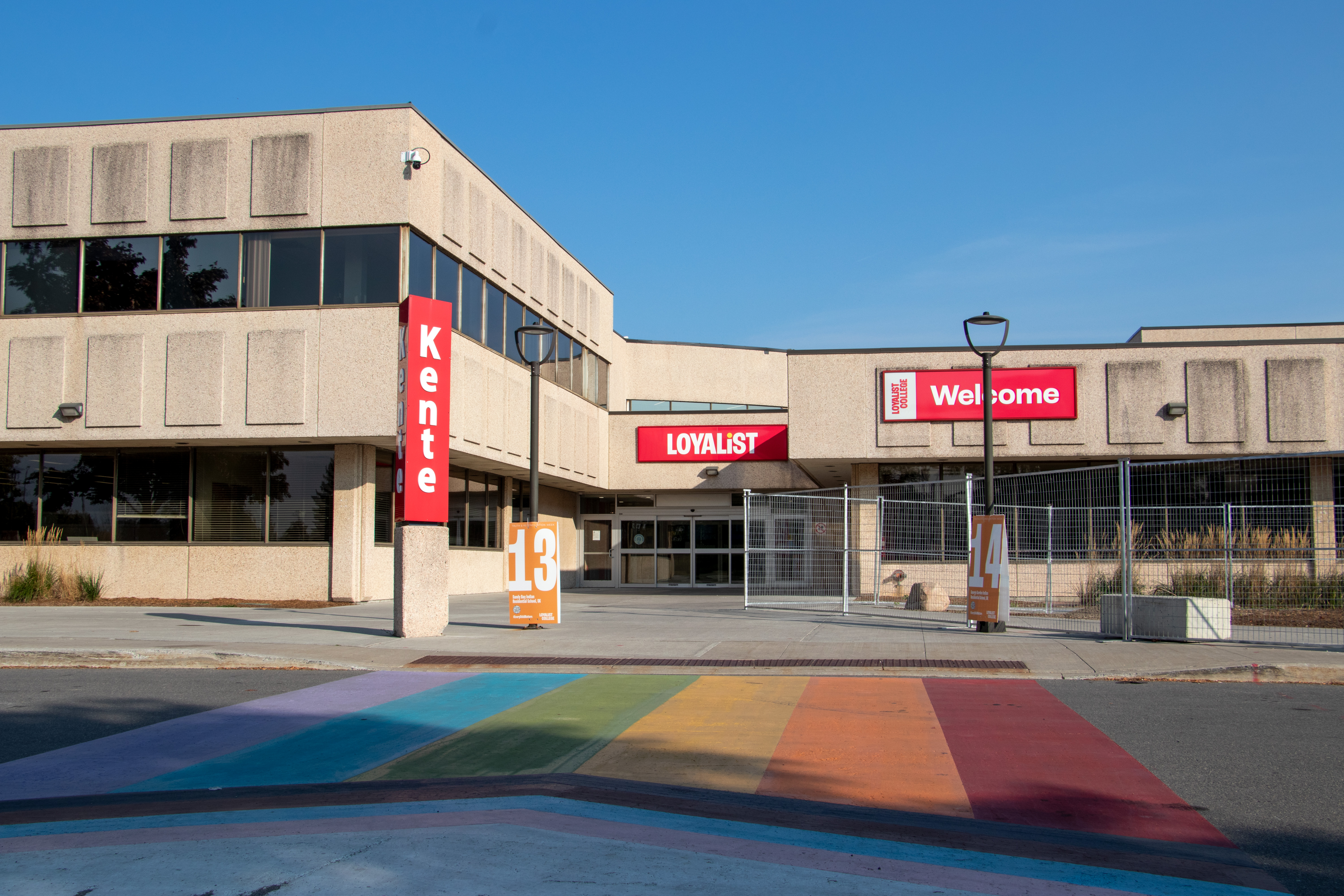
Front entrance of Loyalist College, 2023

The Academy of Learning College is a local college located on the east end of Belleville.

Loyalist College is a local public community college located on the border of Belleville and Quinte West on Wallbridge Loyalist Road.

=== Public schools ===
The public school system is served by the Hastings & Prince Edward District School Board. The Catholic School system is served by the Algonquin and Lakeshore Catholic District School Board.

Secondary schools:

- Centennial Secondary School
- Eastside Secondary School
- Bayside Secondary School (Quinte West)

Elementary schools:

- Susanna Moodie Elementary School
- Parkdale Public Elementary School
- Easthill Elementary School
- Prince of Wales Elementary School
- Harry J. Clarke Elementary School (Offers French immersion)
- Sir John A Macdonald School
- Prince Charles Elementary School
- Foxboro Public School
- Bayside Elementary School (Offers French immersion)
- Harmony Public School

=== Catholic schools ===
The following are Belleville area schools managed by the Algonquin and Lakeshore Catholic District School Board.

Secondary schools:

- Nicholson Catholic College
- St. Theresa Catholic Secondary School

Elementary schools:

- Our Lady of Fatima Catholic School
- St Michael's Catholic School (French immersion)
- St Joseph's Catholic School
- Georges Vanier Catholic School
- Holy Rosary Catholic School
- Saint Maracle Catholic School

=== Provincial demonstration schools ===
- Sir James Whitney School for the Deaf
- Sagonaska School

=== Private and Independent schools ===
- Albert College (independent school for Pre-Kindergarten to Grade 12)
- Academy of Learning College
- Quinte Ballet School of Canada
- Quinte Christian High School
- Belleville Christian School
- Belleville Montessori School

== Media ==
=== Print ===
- Belleville Intelligencer (Tuesday thru Saturday)
- Community Press (Every Thursday)

=== Radio ===
Frequency	Call sign	Branding	Format	Owner	Notes
AM 800	CJBQ	CJBQ 800	Full service	Quinte Broadcasting	
FM 90.3	CBO-FM-1	CBC Radio One	Talk radio, public radio	Canadian Broadcasting Corporation	Rebroadcaster of CBO-FM (Ottawa)
FM 91.3	CJLX-FM	91X	Campus radio	Loyalist College	
FM 94.3	CJBC-1-FM	Ici Radio-Canada Première	Talk radio, public radio	Canadian Broadcasting Corporation	Rebroadcaster of CJBC (Toronto)
FM 95.5	CJOJ-FM	Hits 95.5	Adult hits	Starboard Communications	
FM 97.1	CIGL-FM	Mix 97	Hot adult contemporary	Quinte Broadcasting	
FM 100.1	CHCQ-FM	Cool 100.1	Country music	Starboard Communications	
FM 102.3	CKJJ-FM	UCB Radio	Christian radio	United Christian Broadcasters Canada	
FM 107.1	CJTN-FM	Rock 107	Classic rock	Quinte Broadcasting	

=== Television ===
OTA virtual channel (PSIP)	OTA actual channel	Call sign	Network	Notes
22.1	22 (UHF)	CICO-DT-53	TVOntario	Rebroadcaster of CICA-DT (Toronto)

OTA virtual channel (PSIP)	OTA actual channel	Call sign	Network	Notes
4 & 700	4 (Cable TV only)	YourTV Quinte	YourTV	Part of Cogeco Community TV

=== Internet ===
- Quinte News
- QNet News
- InQuinte.ca

== Sister cities ==
The City of Belleville has three sister city arrangements with communities outside of Canada which include:

- Lahr, Baden-Württemberg, Germany – established in 1971
- Gunpo, Gyeonggi-do, South Korea – established in 1996
- Zhucheng, Shandong, People's Republic of China – established in 1996

== Notable people ==
- Lee Aaron, hard rock and jazz singer. Best known for "Metal Queen"
- Marianne Ackerman, playwright, novelist, and journalist'
- Lauren Ash, actress best known for Superstore
- Drew Bannister, professional ice hockey defenceman
- Dennis Bock, novelist and short story writer
- Michael Botterill, professional Canadian football linebacker
- Sir MacKenzie Bowell, Canada's fifth Prime Minister
- Wilfred Leigh Brintnell, a pioneering Canadian aviator
- James Brown, politician
- Stevie Cameron, award-winning investigative journalist and best-selling author
- James Collip, co-discoverer of insulin
- Matt Cooke, NHL hockey player
- Nick Cousins, NHL player
- Brander Craighead, football player
- Bob Crawford, retired NHL hockey player
- Lou Crawford, former OHL and AHL head coach
- Marc Crawford, NHL head coach
- Jack Devine, CJBQ sports commentator, and president of the Canadian Amateur Hockey Association
- Bob Dillabough, retired NHL player with the Detroit Red Wings, Boston Bruins and the Oakland Seals
- Herbert Henry Dow, Dow Chemical, Born February 26, 1866
- Rick Green, retired NHLer
- Ellie Anne Harvie, actress
- Bobby Hull, Hockey Hall of Fame member
- Brett Hull, son of Bobby, Hockey Hall of Fame member (inducted 2009)
- Dennis Hull, Bobby's younger brother, member of 1972 Team Canada
- Aislinn Hunter, poet and fiction writer
- Frances Itani, fiction writer, poet and essayist
- Avril Lavigne, Canadian singer/songwriter and actress, born in Belleville and lived here until age five.
- James Frederick Lister, lawyer
- Norm Maracle, hockey goaltender
- James Marker, inventor of Cheezies
- Dr. William James McCormick, physician, proprietor of the High Park Sanitarium
- Tom McGill, goalkeeper who plays for Brighton and Hove Albion
- Rick Meagher, retired NHL player
- Trennt Michaud, Olympic figure skater
- Rick Mofina, author of crime fiction and thriller novels
- Susanna Moodie (1803–1885), author, moved to Belleville with her husband in 1840 after several years spent "roughing it in the bush" near Lakefield, Ontario
- Riyo Mori, Miss Universe 2007, spent her teenage years in Belleville, studying at Centennial Secondary School and at Quinte Ballet School of Canada
- Farley Mowat, author, born in Belleville
- William Barton Northrup, lawyer and politician
- Brian Orser, figure skater and coach
- Shawn O'Sullivan, 1984 Olympic silver medalist boxer
- Graham Parkhurst, actor
- Pete Quaife, bassist for The Kinks in the 1960s, lived in Quinte Region from 1980 to 2005
- Peter Quinney, Canadian football player, Toronto Argonauts
- Andrew Raycroft, NHL goaltender
- Brad Richardson, NHL forward
- Wallace Havelock Robb, poet and naturalist
- Alexander Milton Ross, abolitionist and agent for the Underground Railroad
- Johnny Rutherford, former Major League Baseball pitcher
- Nancy Anne Sakovich, actress and former model
- Mike Schad, National Football League offensive lineman
- Martin Seemungal, Foreign Correspondent CBC, ABC, CTV, PBS Newshour
- Andrew Shaw, retired NHL player
- Derek Smith, NHL forward
- Harry Leslie Smith, British writer, political commentator and Royal Air Force veteran
- Matt Stajan, NHL forward resided in Belleville from 2000 to 2004
- Manly E. MacDonald, Semi-impressionistic painter
- Alex Stieda, former professional road bicycle racer
- Chris Valentine, former ice hockey player and coach
- Thomas Campbell Wallbridge, lawyer and politician
- John Weldon, animated movies director, Oscar Award winner (1979)
- Ed Westfall, retired NHL player
- The Wilkinsons, country music group
- Ty Wishart, professional ice hockey player
- Jerry Yanover, political advisor

== See also ==
- Belleville Cemetery
- Belleville Transit
- Foxboro
