= Anne DeGrace =

Canadian writer and illustrator

Anne DeGrace is a Canadian fiction writer and illustrator who lives near Nelson, British Columbia. She has published four novels and co-authored three photo books.

== Biography ==
Born in Ottawa, Ontario, DeGrace moved to Nelson in 1981.

DeGrace has used themes from Canadian history in her novels, which were originally published by McArthur & Co. and later represented by Cormorant Books.

Treading Water (2005) was the selected title for the One Book, One Kootenay project in 2010. Wind Tails (2007), published as Far From Home by HarperCollins in the U.S., was shortlisted for the Evergreen Award. Sounding Line (2009) was a Chapters/Indigo Heather's Pick. Flying with Amelia was published in hardcover by McArthur & Company in 2011, and in trade paperback by Cormorant Books in 2014.

In 2011, DeGrace was named Nelson's third Cultural Ambassador. She has been a columnist for Nelson newspapers since 1989. She has illustrated several books for children, primarily for Polestar Press and Bluefield Books. As an editor and publishing consultant she has worked to produce several historical and local interest books.

== Bibliography ==
- Nelson British Columbia in Photographs. (with Steve Thornton) Nelson: Ward Creek Press, 1996. ISBN 9780968073902
- The West Kootenay in Photographs. (with Steve Thornton) Nelson: Ward Creek Press, 1997. ISBN 0968073913
- Treading Water. Toronto: McArthur & Co, 2005. ISBN 155278598X
- Wind Tails. Toronto: McArthur & Co., 2007. ISBN 9781552787335
- Sounding Line. Toronto: McArthur & Co., 2009. ISBN 9781552788837
- Far From Home. (published in Canada as Wind Tails.) HarperCollins/Avon, 2009. ISBN 9780061728808
- Nelson British Columbia. (with Steve Thornton) Nelson: Ward Creek Press, 2010. ISBN 978-0968073933
- Flying with Amelia. Toronto: McArthur & Co., 2011. ISBN 9781770863569
