= Belleville City Hall =

Canadian civic building

Coordinates: 44.16275°N 77.3834167°W

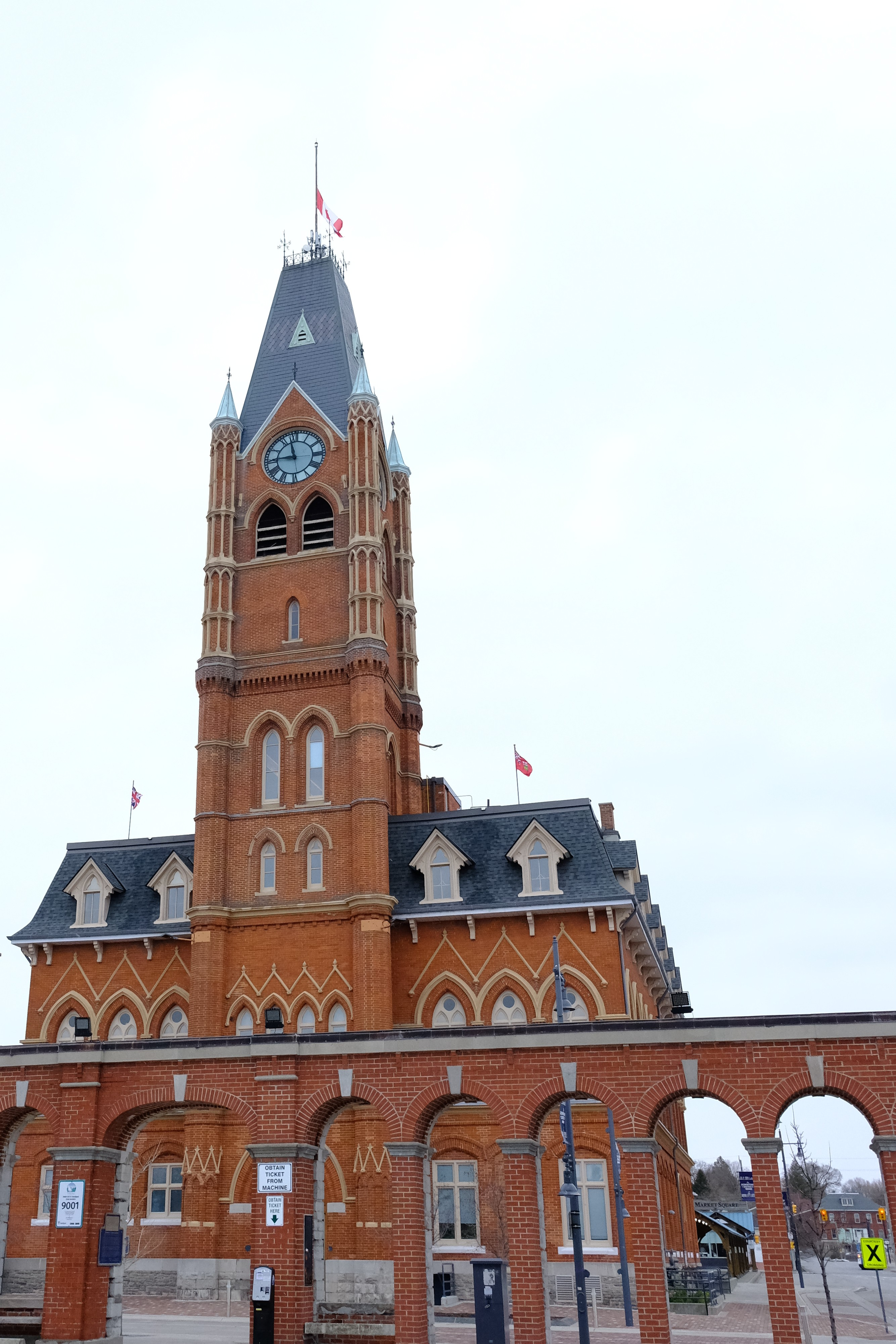
Belleville City Hall

Belleville City Hall is home to Belleville City Council and located at 169 Front Street between Macannay and Market Streets in Belleville, Ontario.

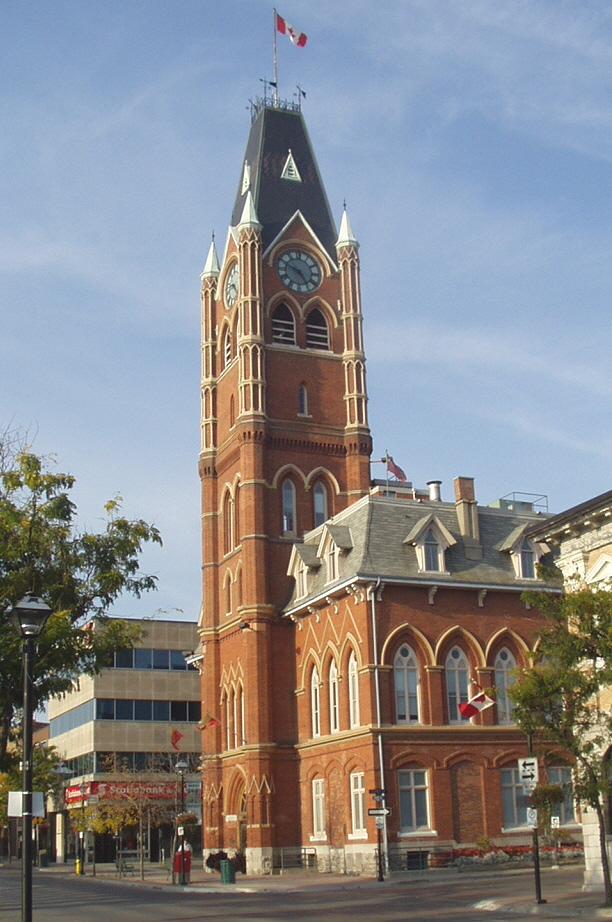
Another view of Belleville City Hall, from Front and Market Streets

Built in 1873 as town hall and market by local architect John D. Evans, the High Victorian Gothic Revival was built using limestone and red brick. It became city hall in 1877 when Belleville became a city.

Originally a two-storey building, it housed the local farmer's market, which moved in 1961. Two floors were added during renovations in 1988.
