= Belleville Transit =

Public transit operator in Ontario, Canada

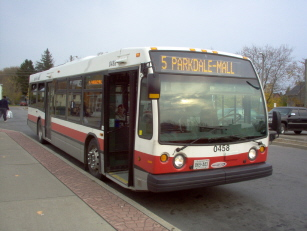
- Belleville Transit Nova Bus LFS at the Pinnacle Terminal in 2005
- Parent: City of Belleville
- Founded: May 1960; 66 years ago
- Headquarters: 400 Coleman Street
- Locale: Belleville, Ontario
- Service type: Bus service
- Routes: 9
- Hubs: Pinnacle Terminal
- Fleet: 20 conventional buses 6 specialized service buses
- Daily ridership: 4,200 (2019)
- Operator: City of Belleville
- Website: Belleville Transit

Belleville Transit is the public transit operator in Belleville, Ontario, Canada and is one of the services provided by the city's Engineering & Public Works Department. The current Belleville Transit was created in 1960, taking over operations from Rawson Bus Lines who operated service in Belleville from 1920-1960.

== Fares ==
Fares are as of January 1, 2026. The cash fare for all fare types is $4.00.

Since October 29, 2024, riders can also purchase a reloadable, electronic fare card, B-Tap. For electronic tickets and B-Tap card users, adult fares cost $4.00 and concession fares cost $3.75.

For a monthly pass, the adult pass is $90.00/month, and the concession pass is $85.00/month.

Children (ages 4 and under) and high school students – who are enrolled in a high school within the City of Belleville and use their school-issued transit pass sent to their school email address – can travel fare free on Belleville Transit.

== Services ==
Buses operate between 5:00am and 10:30pm on Monday to Friday, with reduced service on the weekend; from 6:50am to 6:15pm on Saturday and 9:00am to 6:00pm on Sunday. There is no service on statutory holidays.

As of September 2026, Belleville Transit operates 9 conventional routes, all routes are wheelchair-accessible.

Route		Direction & destination				Service & frequency	Other Notes
1	North Front	NB	To Quinte Mall	SB	To Terminal	Peak: 30-40min Off-Peak: 30min (Weekday off-peak) 60min (Weekend off-peak)	
2	Sidney	NB	To Quinte Mall	SB	To Terminal	Peak: 20-30min (Weekday peak) 30-40min (Weekend peak) Off-Peak: 30min (Weekday off-peak) 60min (Weekend off-peak)	
3A	College Street	Anti-Clockwise		Terminal, Pinnacle Street, Station Street, VIA Rail Station, Bettes Street, Emily Street, Cannifton Road, College Street, Sidney Street, Moira Street, Dundas Street, Terminal		Peak: 30min Off-Peak: 30min	Combined frequency means departing terminal every 15 minutes during peak and 30 minutes during off peak. Connects to VIA Rail
3C	College Street	Clockwise		Terminal, Dundas Street, Moira Street, Sidney Street, College Street, Cannifton Road, Emily Street, Bettes Street, VIA Rail Station, Station Street, Pinnacle Street, Terminal		Peak: 30min Off-Peak: 30min	Combined frequency means departing terminal every 15 minutes during peak and 30 minutes during off peak. Connects to VIA Rail
4	Dundas West	EB	To Terminal	WB	To Loyalist College	40min	
5A	East Hill	Anti-Clockwise		Terminal, Dundas Street, Herchimer Avenue, Bridge Street, Haig Road, Hickory Grove, Farley Avenue, Victoria Avenue, Dufferin Avenue, Bridge Street, Terminal		Weekday: 30min Weekend: 60min	Combined frequency means departing terminal every 15 minutes during weekdays and 30 minutes during weekends.
5C	East Hill	Clockwise		Terminal, Bridge Street, Dufferin Avenue, Victoria Avenue, Farley Avenue, Hickory Grove, Haig Road, Bridge Street, Herchimer Avenue, Dundas Street, Terminal		Weekday: 30min Weekend: 60min	Combined frequency means departing terminal every 15 minutes during weekdays and 30 minutes during weekends.
6	Industrial	NB	To Quinte Mall	SB	To Terminal	Peak: 30-40min Off-Peak: 60-80min	
6A	Industrial	NB	To Quinte Mall (via Amazon Warehouse)	SB	To Terminal (via Amazon Warehouse)	Peak: 30-40min Off-Peak: 60-80min	
7	Cannifton	NB	To Millenium Parkway	SB	To Terminal	Peak: 30-40min Off-Peak: 40-60min	
8	Avondale	EB	To Terminal	WB	To Potters Creek	Peak: 40min Off-Peak: 80min	Officially a loop route rather than an East-West route. Takes Moira Street when going westbound and Bridge Street when returning eastbound.
N	Night Route	Start	From Millennium Parkway	End	To Loyalist College	Two scheduled runs	Single-Direction Night Route. Connects to VIA Rail

Belleville Transit also has regional transit connections with Quinte Transit, Megabus, and VIA Rail Canada.

== Fleet ==
Belleville Transit's fleet currently consists of 20 40-foot, conventional buses and 6 specialized service buses. Belleville Transit began transitioning to a greener fleet in 2024, purchasing an ex-demonstrator Nova Bus LFS HEV as part of this initiative. Three additional hybrid buses were ordered from New Flyer for their 40-foot, hybrid Xcelsior model in 2024, all three buses entered service on September 4, 2025.

- Nova Bus:
  - 2008 2nd-Gen LFS: 0862–0863 (Former demonstrator models)
  - 2010 3rd-Gen LFS: 1065–1068
  - 2011 3rd-Gen LFS: 1169
  - 2012 3rd-Gen LFS: 1370 (Former demonstrator model)
  - 2013 3rd-Gen LFS: 1371
  - 2014 4th-Gen LFS: 1472 (Former demonstrator model L840-3; built as MTA 8092, but was never delivered)
  - 2021 4th-Gen LFS: 2164 (Former CTA 8350)
  - 2021 4th-Gen LFS: 2176–2180
  - 2022 4th-Gen LFS HEV: 2284 (Former demonstrator model)
- New Flyer:
  - 2025 XDE40: 60-25–61-25, 85-25
- Chevrolet:
  - 2016 Glaval Bus Titan II: 1673–1675
- Creative Carriage:
  - 2023 CS-2: 2381–2383

== See also ==
- Public transport in Canada
