= Dixie Lee Fried Chicken =

Canadian fast-food restaurant

- Type: Privately held company
- Industry: Fast food
- Founded: 1964; 62 years ago in Belleville, Ontario
- Founders: Ramon Leon; Douglas Walmsley
- Products: Fried Chicken; Fish & Chips
- Website: dixieleefriedchicken.com

Dixie Lee Fried Chicken is a Canadian fast-food chain founded in 1964 by Ramon Leon and Douglas Walmsley in Belleville, Ontario. Originally a regional franchise, the company has no publicly available headquarters location. According to their website, they have locations mostly within Ontario, in Bancroft, Barrie, Penetanguishene, Sylvan Lake, AB, and Ogdensburg, NY. In late 2024, the chain announced a major international expansion into the Middle East, India, and Far East Asia through a partnership with Timms Holding Limited. This move marks its first significant global push in over 60 years. In Canada, it continues to operate through major groups like Dixie Lee Maritimes, which manages 38 locations.

== History ==
The first Dixie Lee restaurant opened in 1964 in Belleville, Ontario.

The first Dixie Lee restaurant in New Brunswick opened its door in Caraquet, as a small take-out restaurant just past the wharf.. Following a fire during a winter storm, the restaurant changed locations locally, moving again to a bigger building in the mid-1990s. Other restaurants opened in Grande-Anse, Shippagan, Tracadie-Sheila (one of the first to include a drive-through option) and then in Lamèque.

In 1974, Alton Scott built and operated a U.S. location in Houlton, Maine which went bankrupt in 1981. A location franchised in Ogdensburg, New York that opened in 1969 was sold in 2012.

By 1975, the chain claimed "over 101 fried chicken and seafood takeout stores in the U.S. and Canada" and was actively recruiting new franchisees through a U.S. office in Massena, New York. Many of these locations were existing restaurants under local branding who carried Dixie Lee chicken as a sideline.

David Silvester started in the business in 1970 as an owner/operator of a single Dixie Lee outlet in Castlegar, British Columbia. He then acquired a Dixie Lee area franchise for British Columbia where he opened and sold 17 franchises. After developing British Columbia, he bought the Dixie Lee franchise parent company in 1979. Silvester moved to Dixie Lee's Head Office in Belleville. He was responsible for developing Dixie Lee from eight outlets in Ontario to more than 50 by 1987; he sold the company in January 2006.

In 2006, the chain claimed to be the fourth largest chicken franchise company in Canada with sales in excess of $55 million per year from over 77 restaurants in operation in Canada and the United States. Dixie Lee restaurants were located in Ontario (25 outlets), New Brunswick, British Columbia, Alberta, and Quebec.

In 2006, Joe Murano assumed the management of the company as a president. His previous franchise experience is with Kingston local chains Bandito Video (now defunct) and Papa Pete's pizza. The corporate head office was located in Napanee, Ontario and the company listed by OTC Markets Group as over-the-counter stock Dixie Lee International Industries, Inc (Pink Sheets: DLII).

In April 2020, the start of the COVID-19 pandemic, the Dixie Lee corporate headquarters sought to help those considered essential workers. Through a phone line, the general public could donate a hero meal served by its franchises.

=== Dixie Lee International ===
One branch opened in Dubai, United Arab Emirates in 2008 but is now closed. A Kyiv, Ukraine location operated briefly in 2008 with plans to establish five restaurants in that country.

Expansion to Manchester, UK was also attempted; the chain predicted locations in China and India would be in operation by the end of 2008.

In 2012, an expansion was attempted into Jamaica. Malaysia and Sri Lanka were also targets for Dixie Lee franchises.

In July 2024, Dixie Lee Fried Chicken announced plans to expand into the Middle East, Far East Asia and the Indian subcontinent. This initiative is being facilitated by Timms Holding Limited.

== Menu and nutrition ==
Dixie Lee restaurants serve fish and chips, fried chicken, nuggets and other side items such as cole slaw, French fries, wings, wraps and soft drinks. According to its website, fried products are prepared with trans-fat free oils.

== See also ==
- List of fast-food chicken restaurants
