= Marianne Ackerman =

Canadian novelist, playwright, and journalist

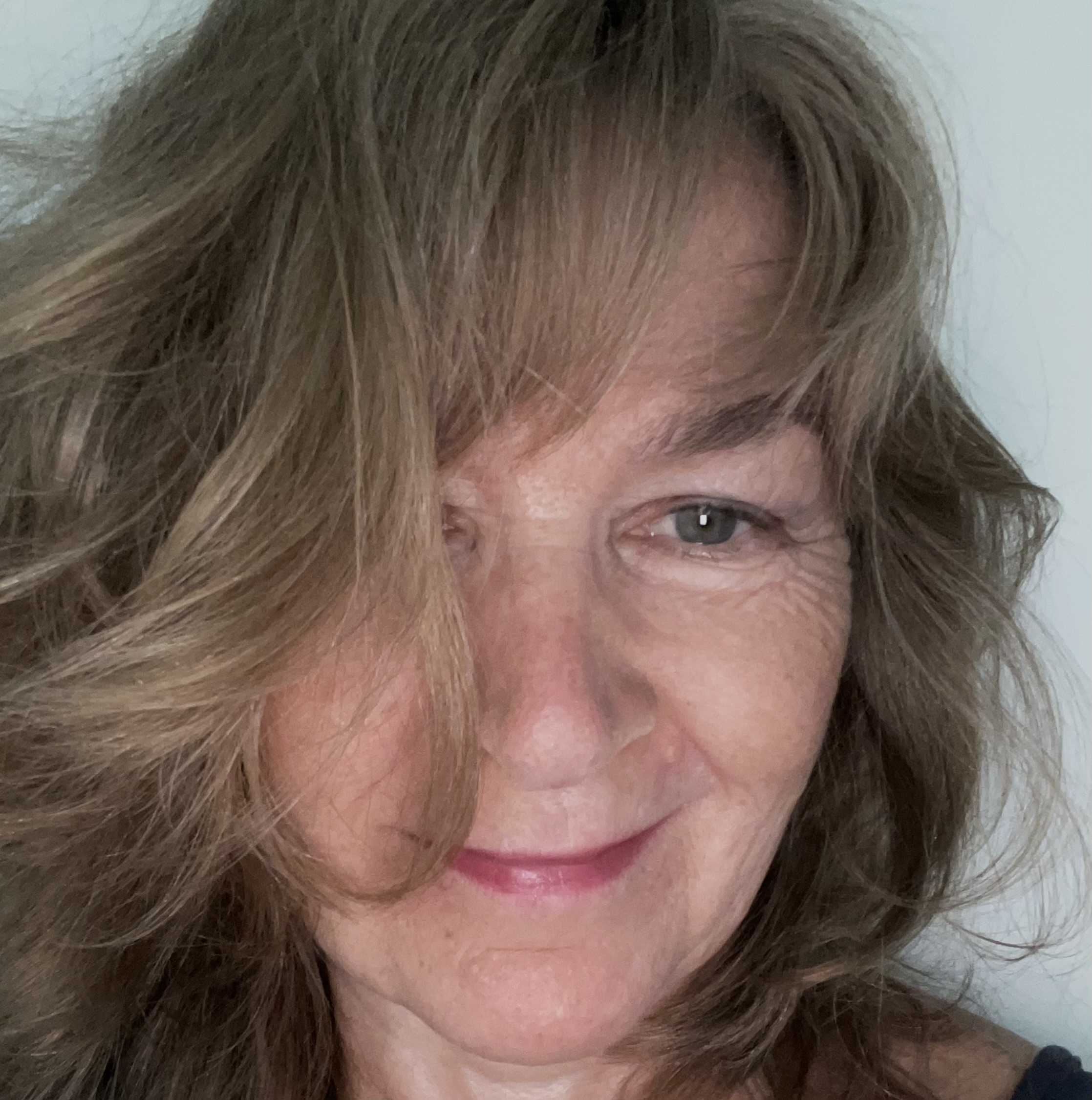
- Born: 1952 (age 73–74); Belleville, Ontario, Canada
- Occupation: Writer
- Writing career
- Genres: Fiction, Drama, Journalism
- Notable works: Piers' Desire, L'Affaire Tartuffe, Triplex Nervosa Trilogy
- Website: www.marianneackerman.com

Marianne Letitia Ackerman (born 1952) is a Canadian novelist, playwright, and journalist. Mankind and Other Stories of Women, her fifth work of prose fiction, was published by Guernica Editions in 2016. Her play Triplex Nervosa premiered at Centaur Theatre in April 2015. Triplex Nervosa Trilogy was published by Guernica in 2020.

== Biography ==
Marianne Ackerman was born in Belleville, Ontario and grew up on a farm in Prince Edward County. She received a Bachelor of Arts in Political Science (Honours) from Carleton University in 1976. She spent a year at the Sorbonne in Paris studying French language and culture before receiving a Master of Arts in Drama from the University of Toronto in 1981.

From the early 1980s, Ackerman lived in Montreal, where she worked as a freelance journalist and as theatre critic for the Montreal Gazette, winning the Nathan Cohen Award for theatre criticism.

In the late 1980s, she founded a bilingual theatre company, Theatre 1774, which staged her plays L'Affaire Tartuffe, Woman by a Window, Céleste and Blue Valentine, as well as her adaptations of August Strindberg's Miss Julie and William Shakespeare's Measure for Measure. The company also staged Echo, a play developed by Robert Lepage from Ann Diamond's book of poetry, A Nun's Story, co-produced with Theatre Passe Muraille. She and Lepage collaborated on Alienouidet, a play about the actor Edmund Kean in Canada, directed by Lepage at the NAC. Venus of Dublin, a distilled version of the story, premiered at the Centaur Theatre in 2000, and has since been produced several times.

After leaving Theatre 1774 and Quebec in 1997, she lived in the hamlet of La Roque Alric, France, moving back to Montreal in 2004. Her freelance articles, essays, reviews and criticism have appeared in The Walrus, The Montreal Gazette, The Globe and Mail, The Canadian Theatre Review, The Guardian Weekly, En Route Magazine and other publications. She has taught courses in playwrighting and the history of Quebec theatre at McGill University.

Ackerman currently lives in Montreal. She is married to Gwyn Campbell, a professor of economic history at McGill University, and has a daughter.

== Prizes and honours ==
- 1985, 1988, 1995, Nathan Cohen National Award for Theatre Criticism
- 1989 Jurors Award, Quebec Drama Festival, for Blue Valentine
- 1988 Best New Play Award, Quebec Drama Festival, for Snakeprints
- 1989 King's Theatre New Play Award, for Grande Ideas
- 1998 Nominee, Best New Play, Best Anglophone Production, Académie Québécoise du Théâtre, for Blue Valentine
- 1995 Best English-Language Production Award, Académie Québécoise du Théâtre, for Sliding in All Directions

== Bibliography ==
=== Novels and Short Stories ===
- Jump (2000) McArthur & Company
- Matters of Hart (2005) McArthur & Company
- Piers' Desire (2010) McArthur & Company
- Holy Fools + 2 Stories (2014) Guernica Editions
- Mankind and Other Stories of Women (2016) Guernica Editions

=== Plays ===
- Snakeprints (1988)
- Night Driving (1989)
- Grande Ideas (1989)
- Sharansky (1989)
- Alanienouidet (co-written with Robert Lepage) (1992)
- Woman By A Window (1992)
- L'Affaire Tartuffe, or the Garrison Officers Rehearse Molière (1993)
- Sliding in All Directions (co-writer) (1995)
- Celeste (1995)
- Blue Valentine (1996)
- Venus of Dublin (2000)
- Triplex Nervosa, Rooftop Eden, Famously (2015)
