= McArthur & Company Publishing =

- Status: Defunct
- Founded: 1998
- Founder: Kim McArthur
- Defunct: 2013
- Country of origin: Canada
- Headquarters location: Toronto
- Distribution: Canada
- Publication types: Books

McArthur & Company was a Canadian-owned and operated book publisher and distributor of Canadian and international fiction and non-fiction for adults and children, based in Toronto, Ontario, Canada. It operated from 1998 until 2013 when the company was closed.

== History ==
The company was founded in May 1998 when Time Warner closed Little, Brown Canada (LBL), the company Kim McArthur had started in Canada and run since 1987. She found initial investors, hired most of the LBC staff, bought LBC backlist inventory and author contracts from Time Warner and started the new company three weeks after the closure.

In its first eight years, the company had 63 bestsellers, 21 of them #1 bestsellers evenly split between Canadian and international authors. Its authors have been shortlisted for 21 Canadian awards and have won seven of them. In 2003 alone McArthur had two authors shortlisted for the Governor General's Award for Fiction (Jean McNeil's Private View and Edeet Ravel's Ten Thousand Lovers, published by Hodder-Headline and distributed by McArthur). Canadian authors published by the company included Giller Prize nominee Nancy Huston, Leacock Award winner Marsha Boulton, Arthur Ellis Award winner Rosemary Aubert, Trillium Book Award nominee Barry Callaghan, and Greg Gatenby, Kate Pullinger, AISLIN, Lisa Appignanesi, Anne DeGrace, Sondra Gotlieb, Rosemary Sullivan, Jack Granetstein, and John Brady among others. International authors published by McArthur included Maeve Binchy, Joanna Trollope, Bryce Courtenay, Vikram Seth, Simon Sebag Montefiore, Justin Cartwright, Rosie Thomas and Colleen McCullough.

In addition to its own publishing list, McArthur & Company acted as the exclusive agent in Canada for Orion Books, Hodder Headline until December 2009. McArthur & Company was a member of the Association of Canadian Publishers, the Canadian Booksellers Association and the Ontario Book Publishers Organization. McArthur & Company also did sales and marketing for the Ontario-based firm Exile Editions. HarperCollins Canada handles McArthur & Company's warehousing and distribution.

Kim McArthur closed the company in 2013, after the company experience financial difficulties when Hachette UK moved its best selling authors and Canadian distribution to Hachette US.

After the company had closed, Kim McArthur was found guilty of Wage Theft by the Ontario Ministry of Labour.
